= Sirodotia =

Scientific classification
- Clade: Archaeplastida
- Division: Rhodophyta
- Class: Florideophyceae
- Order: Batrachospermales
- Family: Batrachospermaceae
- Genus: Sirodotia; Kylin 1912

Genus of algae

Sirodotia Kylin (1912) is a genus of freshwater red alga in the Batrachospermaceae family, found in temperate and tropical waters. It was first described by Kylin in 1912.

== Etymology ==
The genus name of Sirodotia is in honour of Simon Sirodot (1825–1903), who was a French botanist and algologist. He was also a zoologist and archaeologist, who taught at schools in Toulouse, Strasbourg, Le Mans, Cahors and Limoges.

== Taxonomy ==
Sirodotia was first described by Kylin in 1912. The order Batrachospermales currently has six genera—Sirodotia, Batrachospermum, Kumanoa, Nothocladus, Tuomeya, and Sheathia. The morphology of the gametophyte of Batrachospermum, Sirodotia, Tuomeya, and Nothocladus are more are less similar to each other. In 1990, Necchi and Entwisle proposed to delimit them and raise Batrachospermum from genus level to section level. Phylogenetic studies have further supported the separation of these groups at the genus level.

== Description ==
Attached, gelatinous gametophytic filaments, up to 17 cm long, with a beaded appearance varying from blue-green to yellow-green. Uniseriate central axis with large, cylindrical cells; 4–6 pericentral producing repeatedly branched fascicles of limited growth. In most species, rhizoid-like cortical filaments from lower side of pericentral cells. Each fascicle cell contains several, ribbon-like, parietal chloroplasts with no pyrenoid. Spermatangia budded off terminal fascicle cells, spherical, colorless, 4–7 μm diameter. Little differentiated carpogonial branches with small cells. Carpogonia with broad trichogyne attached off-center to base, latter structure having a definite protrusion. Carposporophyte a branched filament creeping along main axis; carposporangia formed at branch apices. Carpospores germinate into Chantransia (= Pseudochantransia) stage, composed of branched, uniseriate filaments. Meiosis and monosporangia not observed.

The genus Sirodotia has been recognized by the two important reproductive characters such as asymmetrical carpogonium in the gametophyte and indeterminate/indistinct gonimoblast filament in the carposporophyte. Further recognition of species inside the genus is done by various distinct characters like morphology of the gametophyte, position of spermatangia, position of the carpogonial branch, gonimoblast filament arising from the side of from carpogonium, and the size of the carpogonium.

== Distribution ==
Sirodotia species are found worldwide in tropical and temperate freshwaters. In India, it is reported from the Western Ghats and Eastern Ghats.

== Species ==
As accepted by Algae Base:

- Sirodotia angolensis (West & G.S.West) Skuja
- Sirodotia assamica O.Nechi Jr., Rossignolo, Yasmin, J.A.West & E.K.Ganesan, 2020
- Sirodotia ateleia var. australis Skuja ex T.J.Entwisle
- Sirodotia cirrhosa Skuja ex M.S.Balakrishnan & B.B.Chaugule
- Sirodotia delicatula Skuja
- Sirodotia gardneri Skuja ex L.Flint
- Sirodotia huillensis (Welwitsch ex West & G.S.West) Skuja
- Sirodotia iyengarii Balusami & Babu
- Sirodotia loefgrenii Skuja
- Sirodotia polygama Skuja ex L.H.Flint
- Sirodotia segawae S.Kumano
- Sirodotia sinica C.-C.Jao
- Sirodotia suecica Kylin - type species
- Sirodotia suecica var. australis Skuja ex T.J.Entwisle
- Sirodotia yutakae S.Kumano C

Former species:

- S. acuminata Skuja ex L.Flint, 1951 accepted as Sirodotia suecica
- S. ambigua Skuja ex T.J.Entwisle accepted as Sirodotia suecica
- S. ateleia Skuja, 1938 accepted as Batrachospermum ateleium (Skuja) Necchi, 1991
- S. fennica Skuja, 1931 accepted as Sirodotia suecica
- S. goebelii Entwisle & Foard, 1999 accepted as Sirodotia suecica
- S. nigrescens (West & G.S.West) Skuja, 1960 accepted as Torularia puiggariana (Grunow) M.J.Wynne, 2019
- S. tenuissima (Collins) Skuja ex L.H.Flint, 1948 accepted as Sirodotia suecica
