= Kumanoa virgatodecaisneana =

Scientific classification
- Clade: Archaeplastida
- Division: Rhodophyta
- Class: Florideophyceae
- Order: Batrachospermales
- Family: Batrachospermaceae
- Genus: Kumanoa
- Species: K. virgatodecaisneana

Binomial name
- Kumanoa virgatodecaisneana (Sirodot) Entwisle, M.L.Vis, W.B.Chiasson, Necchi & A.R.Sherwood, 2009

Species of alga

Kumanoa virgatodecaisneana is a species of alga belonging to the family Batrachospermaceae.

Synonym:

- Batrachospermum virgatodecaisneanum Sirodot (= basionym)
