= Sirodotia huillensis =

Scientific classification
- Domain: Eukaryota
- Clade: Archaeplastida
- Division: Rhodophyta
- Class: Florideophyceae
- Order: Batrachospermales
- Family: Batrachospermaceae
- Genus: Sirodotia
- Species: S. huillensis

Binomial name
- Sirodotia huillensis (Welwitsch ex West & G.S.West) Skuja

Species of alga

Sirodotia huillensis (Welwitsch ex West & G.S.West) Skuja is a freshwater red algal species belonging to the family Batrachospermaceae. This species mostly reported from high altitude forest streams.

== Description ==
S. huillensis ranges from 6–10 cm tall, the thallus is moderately mucilaginous and abundantly branched. Branches arise from the internodes. A few grows like main axis and others remaining short, giving a false appearance of sparse branching.The colour of the gametophyte varies from light green to olive green. Primary and secondary fascicles (whorls) are produced all along the plant body which gives a beaded appearance to the thallus. The whorls are 280.50 – 540.10 μm in diameter and 210.85 to 764.95 μm long. There are secondary fascicles between nodes which are globular when young and obconical (cone) at maturity.

S. huillensis is both diecious and monoecious. Spermatangia are produced in separate male plants on both primary and secondary laterals, apical or sub apical in position which are either single or in clusters, pairs are also common. The first carpogonial branch arises at 15–30th axial cells, 1–2 per basal cell, 3–5 cell long. It is slightly curved with distinctly stalked cylindrical trichogyne on the dorsal side of asymmetrical carpogonia. The carpogonia are slightly protruded or broader on ventral side and 7.50 to 12.85 μm in diameter. The trichogyne is cylindrical elongated with a wavy margin.

The initiation of the gonimoblast filament starts from the ventral side of the carpogonium. Gonimoblast filaments creep along the cortical filaments and produce 2 - 4 celled branches, which forms the carposporangium.

== Distribution ==
S. huillensis occurs strictly in freshwater and grows in high altitude streams with low temperatures. It has been reported in temperate and tropical countries. In India, it has been reported in Maharashtra, Karnataka, and Orissa.
