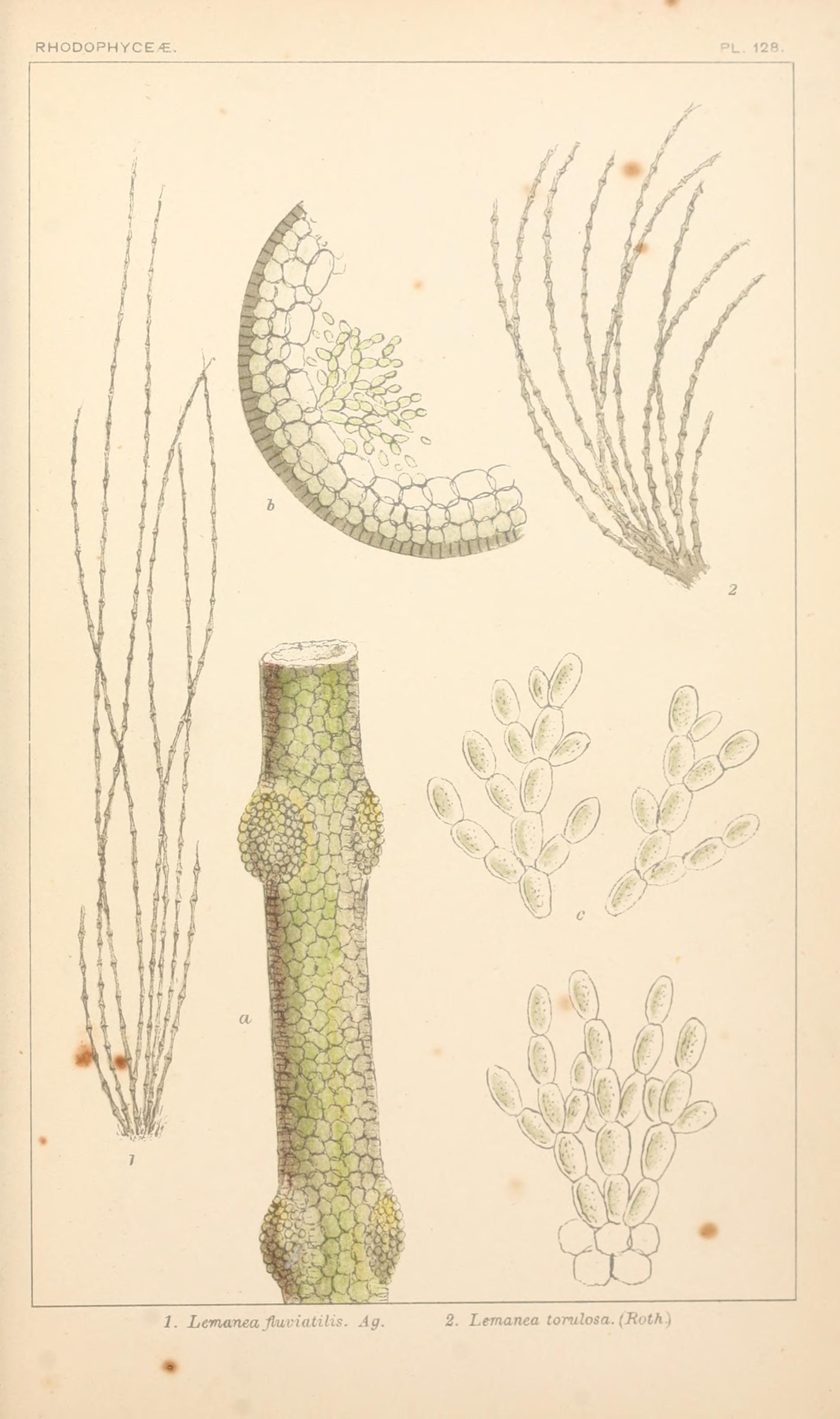
- Lemanea fluviatilis (left, labelled 1) along with other British fresh-water algae, 1882-1884

Scientific classification
- Clade: Archaeplastida
- Division: Rhodophyta
- Class: Florideophyceae
- Order: Batrachospermales
- Family: Lemaneaceae
- Genus: Lemanea
- Species: L. fluviatilis

Binomial name
- Lemanea fluviatilis (Linnaeus) C.Agardh, 1811

= Lemanea fluviatilis =

Species of alga

Lemanea fluviatilis is a species of alga belonging to the family Lemaneaceae.

It is native to Europe and Northern America.
