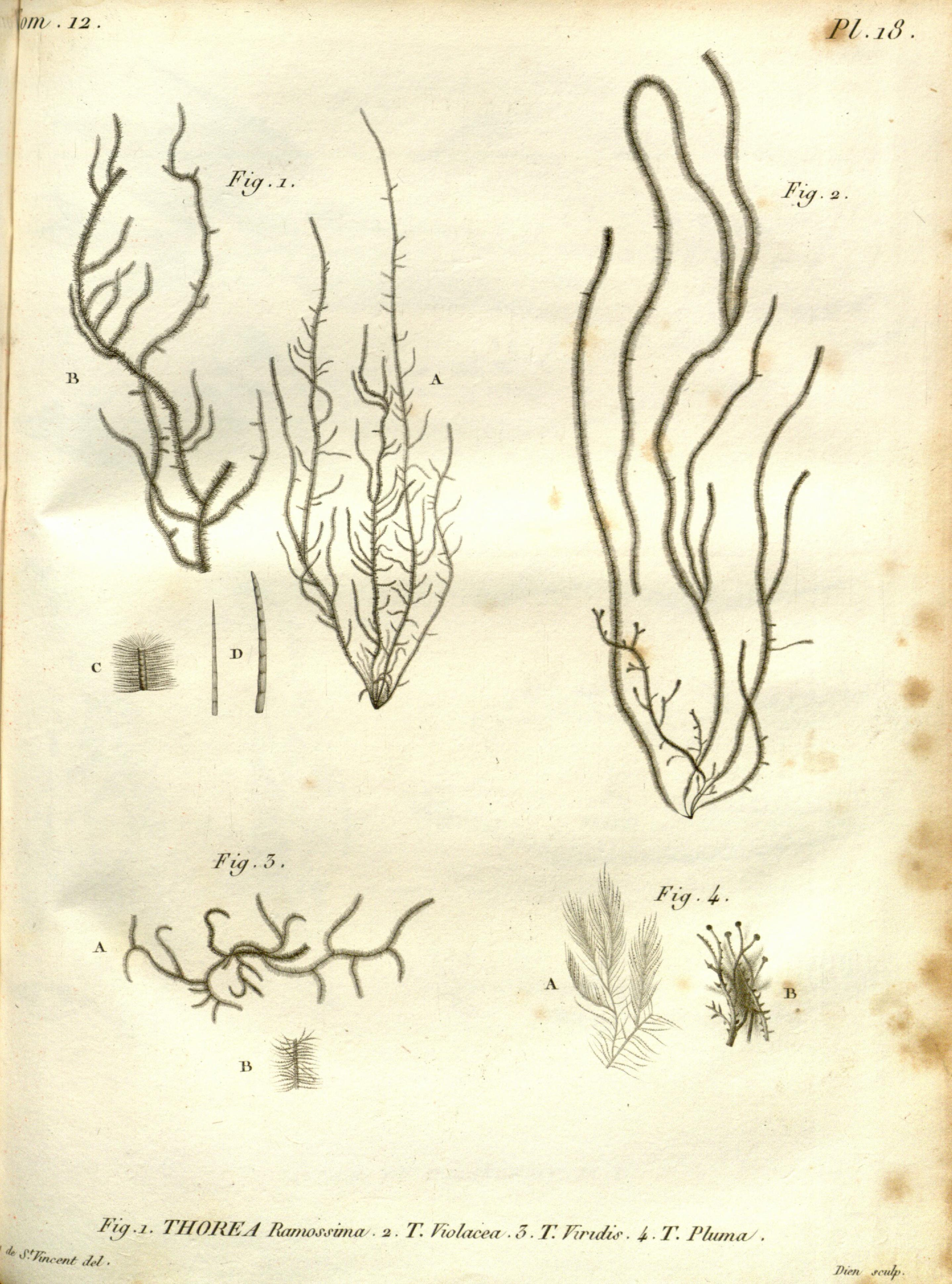

Scientific classification
- Clade: Archaeplastida
- Division: Rhodophyta
- Class: Florideophyceae
- Order: Thoreales
- Family: Thoreaceae
- Genus: Thorea; Bory de Saint-Vincent, 1808

Synonyms
- Polycoma Pasilot de Bauvois, 1808 unaccepted Thorella B. Gaillon, 1883 unaccepted

= Thorea =

Genus of algae

Thorea is a genus of fresh water algae in the division Rhodophyta (red algae). Thorea is a small alga with filaments up to 200 cm long, dark green in colour and not red as are marine Rhodophyta. The filaments have only as few secondary branches.

Thorea is distributed throughout temperate and tropical regions.

The genus was circumscribed by Jean Baptiste Bory de Saint-Vincent in Ann. Mus. Natl. Hist. Nat. vol.12 on page 126 in 1808.

The genus name of Thorea is in honour of Jean Thore (1762–1823), who was a French botanist and physician who practiced medicine in the town of Dax.

== Species ==
As accepted by WoRMS;

- Thorea bachmannii C.Pujals ex R.G.Sheath, M.L.Vis & K.M.Cole, 1993
- Thorea brodensis Klas, 1936
- Thorea clavata Seto & Ratansabapathy, 1981
- Thorea conturba Entwisle & Foard, 1999
- Thorea flagelliformis Zanardini, 1872
- Thorea gaudichaudii C.Agardh, 1824
- Thorea hispida (Thore) Desvaux, 1818
- Thorea okadae Yamada, 1949
- Thorea okaidai Yamada
- Thorea prowsei Ratnasabapathy & Seto, 1981
- Thorea riekei Bischoff, 1965
- Thorea siamensis Kumano & Traichaiyaporn, 2008
- Thorea violacea Bory de Saint-Vincent, 1808
- Thorea zollingeri F.Schmitz, 1892

Former species;

- Thorea andina Lagerheim & Möbius, 1891 accepted as Thorea hispida (synonym)
- Thorea chilensis Montagne accepted as Myriogloea chilensis (Montagne) A.H.Llaña, 1948 (synonym)
- Thorea lehmannii Hornemann, 1818 accepted as Thorea hispida (synonym)
- Thorea ramosissima Bory de Saint-Vincent, 1808 accepted as Thorea hispida (synonym)

== Thorea in UK ==
There is only one species of Thorea in the British Isles: Thorea hispida (Thore) Desvaux (Synonyms: Thorea anadina Lagerheim et K.Mobius, T. lehmannii Horneman and T. ramosissima Bory).

The first record of Thorea ramosissima in the British Isles is in Harvey's Manual (1841): Found in a pool in a bog in the County Donegal Mountains, going from Letterkenny to Dunfanaghy; July. These specimens are in the Ulster Museum (BEL: F42–F47), but proved to have been incorrectly identified and were specimens of Batrachospermum.
