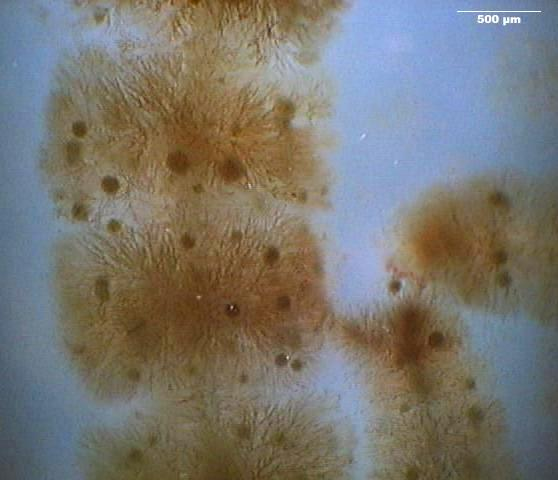
- Batrachospermum moniliforme

Scientific classification
- Domain: Eukaryota
- Supergroup: Archaeplastida
- Division: Rhodophyta
- Class: Florideophyceae
- Order: Batrachospermales
- Family: Batrachospermaceae; C.Agardh

Genera
- Acaropsporophycos Necchi, 2019; Balliopsis G.W.Saunders & Necchi, 2002; Batrachospermum Roth, 1797; Kumanoa Entwisle, M.L.Vis, W.B.Chiasson, Necchi & A.R.Sherwood, 2009; Lympha J.R.Evans, M.L.Vis & I.S. Chapuis, 2017; Montagnia Necchi & M.L.Vis 2019; Nocturama Entwisle & M.L.Vis, 2016; Nothocladus Skuja, 1934; Petrohua G.W.Saunders, 2007; Psilosiphon Entwisle, 1989; Sheathia Salomaki & M.L.Vis, 2014; Sirodotia Kylin, 1912; Torularia Bonnemaison 1828; Tuomeya Harvey, 1858; Virescentia (Sirodot), Necchi, D.C.Agostinho & M.L.Vis, 2018; Visia Necchi 2019; Volatus I.S. Chapuis & M.L.Vis, 2017

= Batrachospermaceae =

Family of algae

Batrachospermaceae is a family of freshwater red algae (Rhodophyta), a group of reddish plants found in rivers and streams. These algae have a distinct life cycle called the "Lemanea-type," starting with small reproductive cells known as carpospores that grow into a form called chantransia. This leads to a sporophyte phase, during which a process called meiosis—where cells divide to create new reproductive cells—takes place in a specialized cell at the filament’s tip, known as the apical cell, responsible for growth. This division results in the gametophyte, the stage of the algae that produces reproductive structures. Various genera within this family are listed in the table below.

The structure of Batrachospermaceae is remarkable for its organization: each filament, or thread-like strand, grows from a single apical cell, a feature termed uniaxial. Inside their cells, they have pit connections—structures with two cap layers, one of which is enlarged—that help maintain strength and linkage between cells. These characteristics make Batrachospermaceae a notable group within the study of freshwater algae.

Genera in Batrachospermaceae
Genus	Authority	Number of species
Acarposporophycos	Necchi	1
Balliopsis	G.W. Saunders & Necchi	1
Batrachospermum	Roth	34
Kumanoa	Entwisle, M.L.Vis, W.B.Chiasson, Necchi & A.R.Sherwood	39
Lympha	J.R.Evans, I.S.Chapuis & M.L.Vis	1
Montagnia	Necchi, M.L.Vis & A.S.Garcia	2
Nocturama	Entwisle & M.L.Vis	2
Nothocladus	Skuja	18
Petrohua	G.W.Saunders	1
Psilosiphon	Entwisle	1
Sheathia	Salomaki & M.L.Vis	19
Sirodotia	Kylin	5
Torularia	Bonnemaison	4
Tuomeya	Harvey	1
Virescentia	(Sirodot) Necchi, D.C.Agostinho & M.L.Vis	7
Visia	Necchi	4
Volatus	I.S.Chapuis & M.L.Vis	3
