= Entwisleia =

Scientific classification
- Domain: Eukaryota
- Supergroup: Archaeplastida
- Division: Rhodophyta
- Class: Florideophyceae
- Subclass: Nemaliophycidae
- Order: Entwisleiales; F.J.Scott, G.W.Saunders & Kraft, 2013
- Family: Entwisleiaceae; F.J.Scott, G.W.Saunders & Kraft, 2013
- Genus: Entwisleia; F.J.Scott, G.W.Saunders & Kraft, 2013
- Species: E. bella

Binomial name
- Entwisleia bella F.J.Scott, G.W.Saunders & Kraft, 2013

Genus of seaweeds

Entwisleia is a monotypic genus in the red algae family, Entwisleiaceae. There is just one species (the type species) in this genus, Entwisleia bella, from south-eastern Tasmania and represents both a new family and a new order (Entwisleiales) in the Nemaliophycidae.

It is a marine species found in the River Derwent estuary. It grows at depths between 5.0 and 9.0 m and is found scattered on mudstone reef flats dusted or shallowly covered by sand. The site at which it was found is subject to episodic high-rainfall events throughout the year and heavy swells in winter. It is a feathery dioecious seaweed, very like the freshwater red algae, Batrachospermum, but from DNA sequencing, appears to be quite unrelated. Scott et al.'s (2013) study shows it as a sister clade of the Colaconematales.

The genus was named to honour Tim Entwisle, was circumscribed by Fiona Jean Scott and Gerald Thompson Kraft in Eur. J. Phycol. Vol.48 (Issue 4) on page 402 in 2013.
