= Morbergs Villa =

Historic summer residence in Jūrmala, Latvia

- Morbergs Villa in 2022

General information
- Location: Dzintaru prospekts 52/54 Jūrmala
- Year built: 1880s
- Renovated: 2007-2008

Website
- morbergavasarnica.lv

Morbergs Villa (Latvian: Morberga vasarnīca), also known as Morbergs Cottage, is a historic summer residence in the Dzintari neighbourhood of Jūrmala, Latvia. Built in the 1880s for Latvian entrepreneur and philanthropist Kristaps Morbergs, the property is notable for its Neo-Gothic wooden architecture, historic interiors and landscaped grounds. The architectural ensemble is owned by the University of Latvia and is designated a national architectural monument.

== History ==
=== Construction and ownership ===
Kristaps Morbergs (1844–1928) was a Latvian entrepreneur and philanthropist who accumulated wealth through construction and real estate in Riga. He later became one of the major benefactors of the University of Latvia.

Morbergs and his wife, Auguste, began developing their summer residence and botanical garden in the mid-1880s. The main building was constructed around 1883–1885, during the growth of Jūrmala as a seaside resort. The couple subsequently expanded the property, creating an ensemble of residential and auxiliary buildings surrounded by landscaped grounds.

Morbergs bequeathed the property to the University of Latvia in his will. The university's official website dates the bequest to 1925. Morbergs died in 1928, leaving a substantial part of his estate to support higher education and students.

=== Soviet period ===
Following the Soviet occupation of Latvia, the property was nationalised. During the subsequent Soviet period, the complex was known as the Maxim Gorky Sanatorium and was used for approximately fifty years.

Much of the original interior furnishings and collections disappeared during this period, including furniture, books, paintings and other works of art. The property's greenhouses and orchard were replaced by a dormitory constructed of sand-lime brick. The remaining historic buildings continued to be maintained, although the original character of the ensemble was partly lost.

=== Restoration ===
After the University of Latvia regained the property, restoration work was undertaken in 2007 and 2008. The buildings and interiors were restored, and the historic landscaping and plantings of exotic species around the buildings were renewed.

== Architecture ==
Morbergs Villa in 2022

The main building is a detached, two-storey wooden structure with a masonry semi-basement, designed in the Historicism style with Neo-Gothic elements. The architectural ensemble also includes auxiliary wooden and masonry buildings, most of which date from the turn of the 20th century.

The villa's surviving interiors include painted ceiling panels, stained-glass windows, polychrome stoves decorated with glazed relief tiles, parquet flooring, original doors and windows, and a fireplace. These features form an important part of the building's architectural and artistic heritage.

The surrounding grounds originally included a botanical garden, greenhouses and an orchard. The restoration sought to recover elements of the historic garden layout and its planting scheme.

== Present day ==
The Morbergs Villa is owned by the University of Latvia and is used for conferences, seminars, receptions and other events. The complex includes rooms with historic interiors, including a stained-glass hall and a fireplace hall. Visits are available by prior arrangement.

The property is designated a national architectural monument and is recognised as an important example of Neo-Gothic wooden architecture in Jūrmala.
