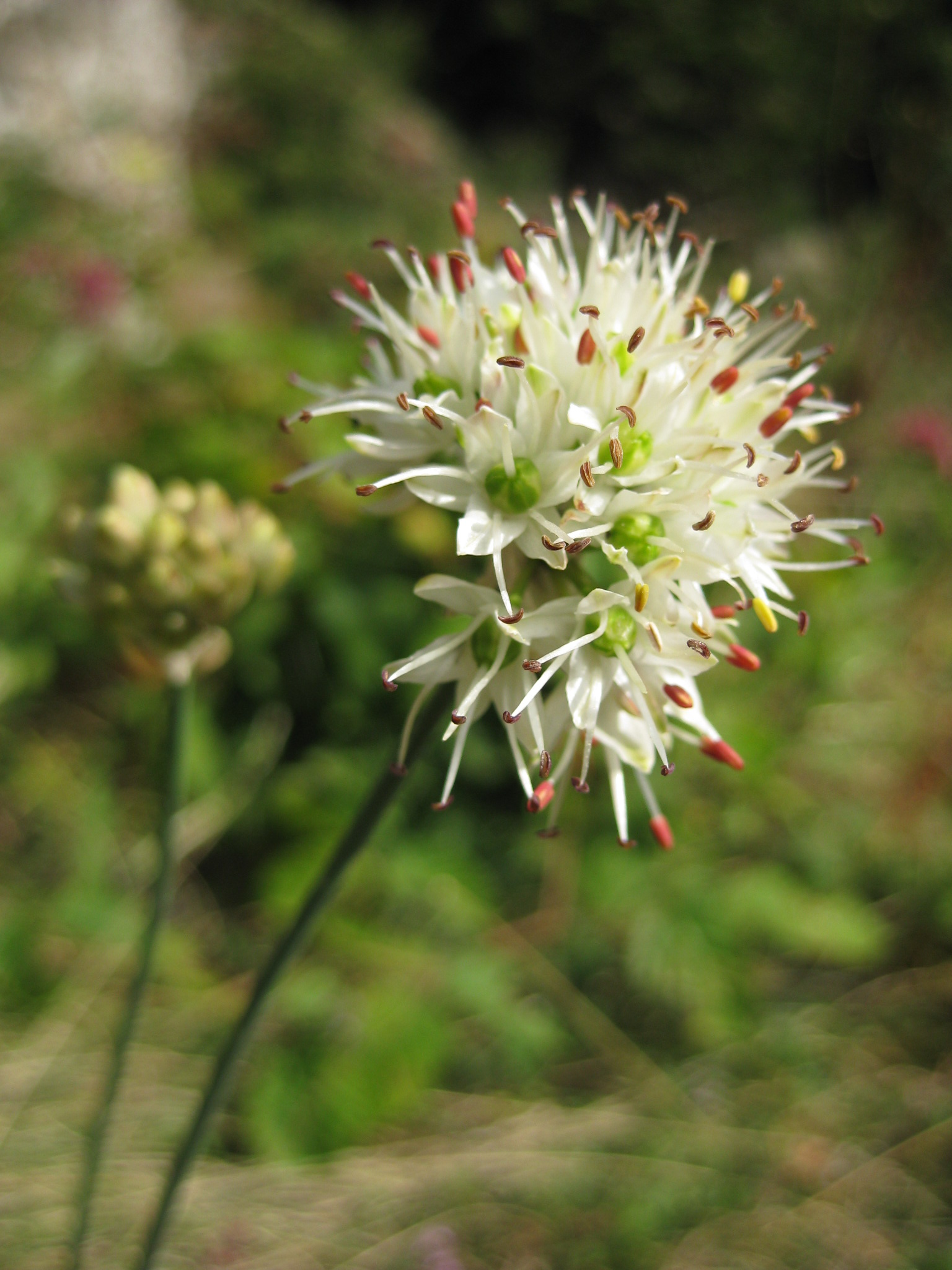

Conservation status
- Data Deficient (IUCN 3.1)

Scientific classification
- Kingdom: Plantae
- Clade: Tracheophytes
- Clade: Angiosperms
- Clade: Monocots
- Order: Asparagales
- Family: Amaryllidaceae
- Subfamily: Allioideae
- Genus: Allium
- Subgenus: A. subg. Polyprason
- Species: A. ericetorum

Binomial name
- Allium ericetorum Thore

Synonyms
- Allium ambiguum DC.; Allium ericetorum subsp. pseudosuaveolens (Zahar.) Ciocârlan; Allium graminifolium Pers.; Allium haussmannii Rouy; Allium ochroleucum Waldst. & Kit.; Allium ochroleucum var. ericetorum (Thore) Nyman; Allium ochroleucum subsp. pseudosuaveolens Zahar.; Allium odorum Lapeyr.; Allium pseudo-ochroleucum Schur; Allium suaveolens Duby; Allium szurulense Lerchenf. ex Kanitz; Allium xanthicum Griseb. & Schenk

= Allium ericetorum =

Species of flowering plant

Allium ericetorum is a species of Allium widespread across much of southern and central Europe, from Portugal to Ukraine.

Allium ericetorum is a perennial herb growing from a bulb. Scape is up to 50 cm tall, round in cross-section. Umbel is hemispherical, with 15–45 bell-shaped white flowers. Stamens are longer than the tepals, with brown anthers. Ovary is green.
