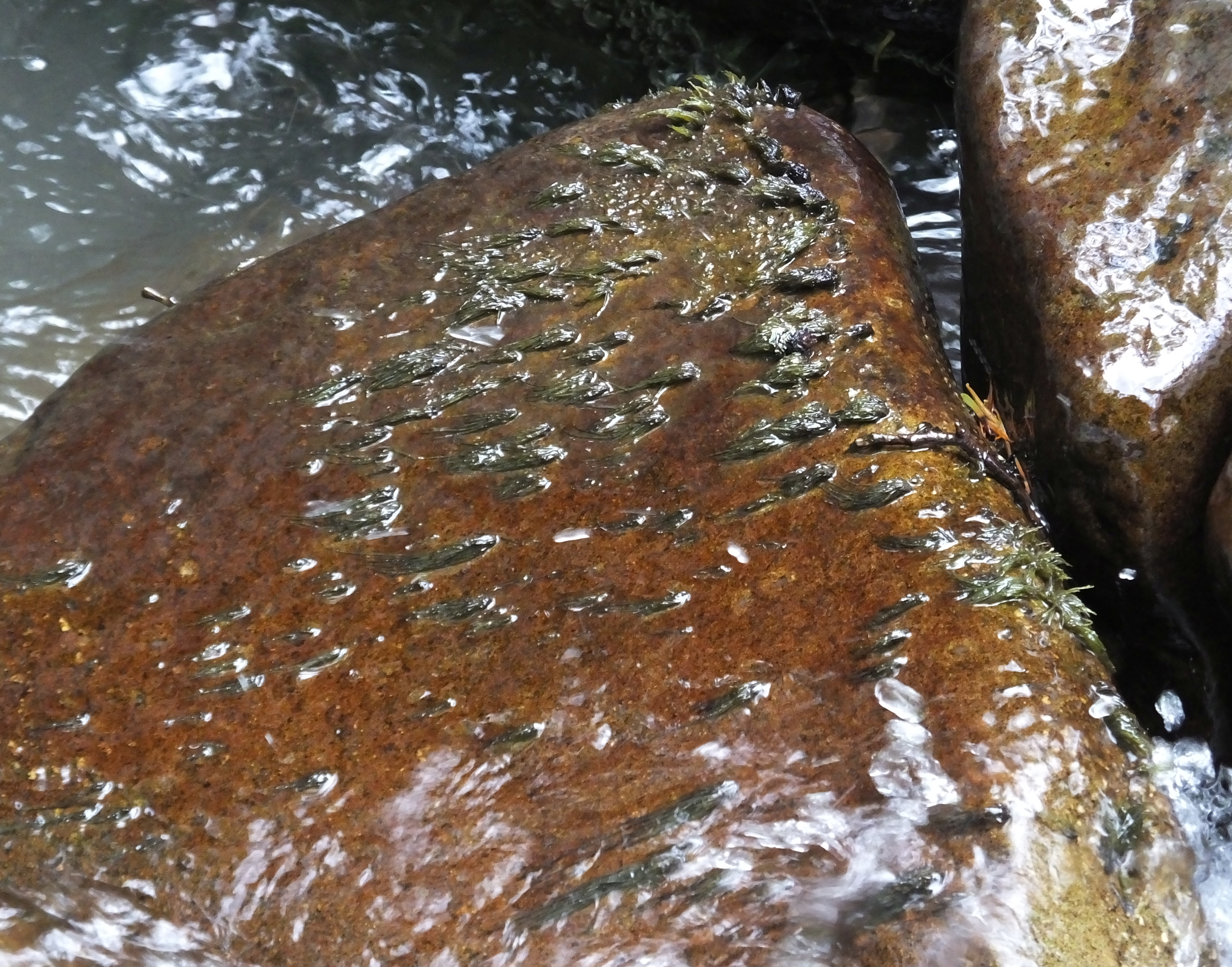
- Lemanea sp. in Polish mountain stream

Scientific classification
- Domain: Eukaryota
- Clade: Archaeplastida
- Division: Rhodophyta
- Class: Florideophyceae
- Order: Batrachospermales
- Family: Lemaneaceae
- Genus: Lemanea; Sirodot, non Bory

= Lemanea =

Genus of algae

Lemanea is a genus of freshwater red algae, in the order Batrachospermales. Both species are considered to be widespread in the northern hemisphere. Although placed in the Rhodophyta (red algae) it in fact is green in colour.

== Description ==
Lemanea is a stiff bristle-like branched or unbranched alga similar to a coarse horsehair. Close inspection show it to have small swellings at more or less regular intervals along its length. It grows to 40 cm in length, in bunches in freshwater. It is blue-green to olive in colour when young. The asexual stage is a row of single-celled branched filaments.

== Species ==
World-wide nine species are listed in algaebase:-

- Lemanea borealis Atkinson
- Lemanea ciliata (Sirodot) De Toni
- Lemanea condensata Israelson
- Lemanea fluviatilis (Linnaeus) C. Agardh
- Lemanea fucina Bory de Saint-Vincent
  - Lemanea fucina var. parva M.L.Vis & R.G. Sheath
- Lemanea mamillosa Kützing
- Lemanra rigida (Sirodot) De toni
- Laminea sinca C.C. Jac
- Lemanea sudeica Kützing

== Taxonomy ==
The genus name of Lemanea is in honour of Dominique Sébastien Léman (1781-1829), who was an Italian-French botanist (interested in Pteridology, Algology and Mycology) and also Mineralogy.

The genus was circumscribed by Jean Baptiste Bory de St. Vincent in Ann. Mus. Hist. Nat. (Paris) vol.12 on page 178 in 1808.

== Distribution ==
The genus is considered to be cosmopolitan in the northern hemisphere.

=== Europe ===
==== United Kingdom ====
There are two species in the British Isles:-

- Lemanea fluviatilis (L.) C.Ag.
- Lemanea fucina Bory

==== Ireland ====
The records of this genus in Ireland are few with only three historic records from the north of Ireland in the Ulster Museum Herbarium (BEL). One collected by William Thompson in 1839; one collected by W. Sawers in 1856 and one collected in 1884 by H.W.Lett. These seem to be the earliest records from the north of Ireland. A more recent specimen collected in 1959 by Miss M.P.H. Kertland near Dungiven, Co. Londonderry is also preserved. A further 16 specimens were collected recently, that is within the last 50 years and have been added to the collection - all from Northern Ireland. They have also one foreign specimen collected from the Faroes. A Lemanea species was found on slabs in the rapidly flowing streams in the NW of the Island of Mull. In 2007, Lemanea fucina has been reported from Clare Island.

=== North America ===
In North America two species in this genus are listed.

- Lemanea borealis Atkinson
- Lemanea fluviatilis (Linnaeus) C.Agardh
  - Lemanea fucina var. parva M.L. Vis & R.G. Sheath

== General references ==
- John, D.M., Whitton, B.A. and Brook, A.J. (Ed.) 2002. The Freshwater Algal Flora of the British Isles. Cambridge University Press.
- Morton, O. 1978. Lemanea in the north of Ireland. Irish Naturalists' Journal 19: 205.
- Sawers, W. 1854. List of algae gathered in the north of Ireland. Naturalist, Morris 4: 254 - 257.
- West, G.S. and Fritsch, F.E. 1927. A Treatise on the British Freshwater Algae. Cambridge University Press, Cambridge. [Facsimile edition printed in 1968 as Vol. 3 of Bibliotheca Phycologia. J.Cramer, Lehre.]
