= Heinrichs Skuja =

Latvian phycologist (1892–1972)

Heinrichs Leonhards Skuja
- Heinrihs Skuja
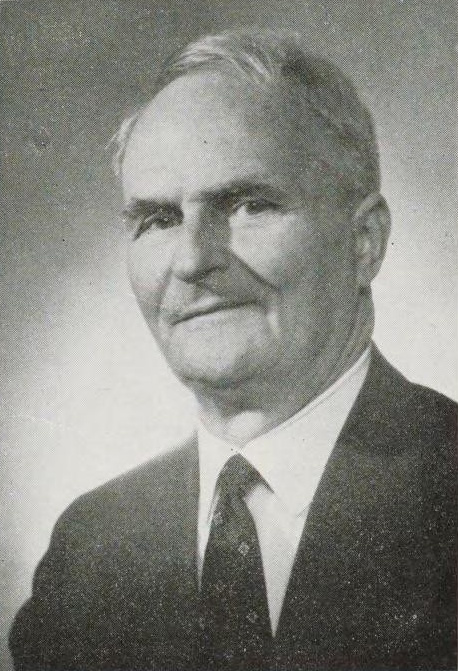
- Born: 8 September 1892; Majori, Latvia
- Died: 19 July 1972 (aged 79); Uppsala, Sweden
- Scientific career
- Fields: Phycology, protistology
- Institutions: University of Latvia, Uppsala University
- Thesis: Studies on the algal flora and vegetation of China, especially its southwestern part (1943)
- Author abbrev. (botany): Skuja
- Author abbrev. (zoology): Skuja

Heinrichs Leonhards Skuja (Latvian: Heinrihs Skuja; 8 September 1892 – 19 July 1972) was a Latvian phycologist active in the 20th century. He is considered an outstanding phycologist and protistologist of his time.

Skuja was actively involved in the study of Latvian algae beginning in 1924. After escaping to Sweden in 1944 near the end of World War II, he continued researching algal systematics and ecology in Uppsala. He received several academic awards from both countries for his contributions to phycology. Due to his extensive knowledge of algae, he received samples from scientific expeditions around the world to be identified by him. He described thousands of new taxa and published over 70 papers and monographs that were accompanied by his own scientific illustrations. In his private life, he invested time in art and music, and was well-regarded by his friends and colleagues.

== Biography ==
=== Early years ===
Heinrichs Leonhards Skuja was born on 8 September 1892 in Majori, Jūrmala, near Riga in Latvia, into a family of carpenters. During his youth, he lived close to the coast and developed an early interest in travel and nature, particularly aquatic plants and animals. His first schooling was at a charity school. After graduating, he spent a year traveling by sailboat across the seas, including long trips in the West Indies and along the North American coast. These travels intensified his interest in aquatic life. He returned to Latvia in 1910, where he attended evening classes at a secondary school in Riga. He finished school in 1912 and went on a long trip by foot, traveling through parts of Sweden, the Netherlands, and Germany.

When the First World War began, his family moved to Baku, in the Caucasus region, where he served as a draftsman and engaged in floristic studies on the Apsheron Peninsula. He returned to Latvia in 1920 and was drafted into the army, where he was a draftsman in the technical department of the Army Commander-in-Chief's Headquarters until 1922, when he was demobilized.

=== Academic life in Latvia ===
In the early 1920s, Skuja was appointed a lecturer in biology at Riga People's High School (Rīgas Tautas augstskola). In 1922 he began his academic studies by attending lectures at the Faculty of Mathematics and Natural Sciences of the University of Latvia (LU), first as an auditor, then from 1923 as an enrolled student. He was primarily interested in taxonomic and phylogenetic problems, and he soon chose algae as his favorite research topic. In a competition for student research papers, Skuja won first prize for his paper Mērsraga–Ragaciema piekrastes aļģu flora (English: Algal flora of the Mērsrags–Ragaciems Coast). By decision of the LU Dean Council, he was enrolled as a student in the Department of Natural Sciences. During his studies in the department, he worked as a teaching assistant and continued researching Latvian freshwater algae. After some minor papers, Skuja published his first major study, Beitrag zur Algenflora des Rigaschen Meerbusens (English: Contribution to the algal flora of the Gulf of Riga), in 1924. He graduated in 1929 and was conferred his mag. rer. nat. degree (equivalent to a master's degree). For his phycological research, he received the Culture Fund Award the same year, and the K. Barons Award in 1931.

After graduation, Skuja worked as a senior lecturer. From 1929 until 1932 he taught at the Institute of Plant Systematics in Riga. Between 1933 and 1939, as a private lecturer, he taught cryptogamy and protistology, as well as a course on symbiosis in protists. From 1940 onwards, in Nazi-occupied Latvia, he taught a botany course to pharmacology and veterinary students. On 14 October 1943, Skuja defended his doctoral thesis Pētījumi par Ķīnas, sevišķi tās dienvidrietumu daļas, aļģu floru un veģetāciju (English: Studies on the algal flora and vegetation of China, especially its southwestern part) and obtained the degree of dr. rer. nat. (equivalent to a PhD).

=== Continued life in Sweden ===
Before the end of the Second World War and the Soviet re-occupation of Latvia, Skuja crossed to the coast of Sweden in a small boat in autumn of 1944. He was soon able to focus entirely on phycological research. He joined Uppsala University as an associate professor in botany from 1947 until his retirement in 1961. In 1958 he received the degree of doctor honoris causa, and in 1961 he was awarded the Björkén Prize for his outstanding achievements in freshwater phycology. Back in Latvia, Skuja's student Antonija Kumsāre continued algal research in the post-war period, and was later joined by Maija Balode, Ivars Druvietis and others.

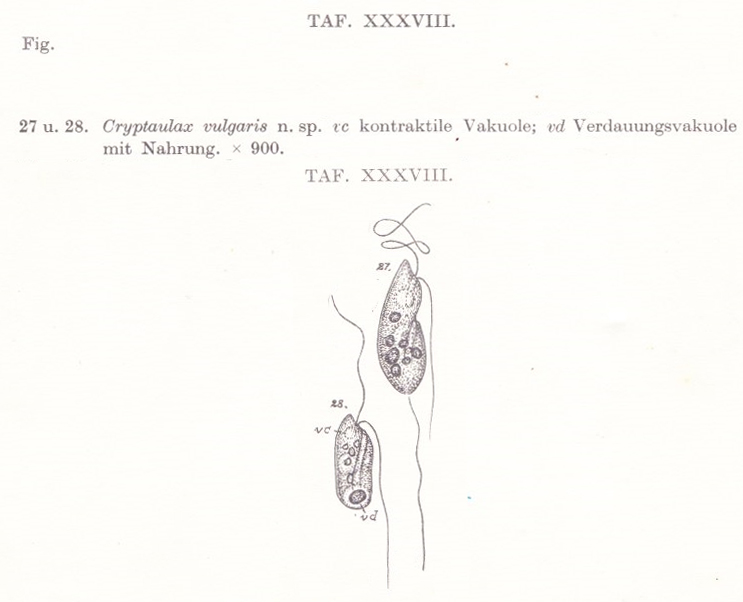
Skuja's 1948 illustration of Cryptaulax vulgaris

During his years in Uppsala, Skuja remained engaged in intensive research on freshwater algae, resulting in comprehensive papers illustrated with his own drawings. He published not only taxonomic and floristic records, but also discussions on phylogenetic relationships and the ecology of freshwater algae. By the early 1970s, he had already produced more than 70 papers, and he disseminated his extensive algal knowledge through annual general and specialized courses, which attracted large numbers of students. He still divided his time between laboratory work and field observations, and set aside a portion of each day for work at the Institute of Systematic Botany at Uppsala. In 1958, he founded the Algological Society of Uppsala.

Even in Sweden, Skuja always felt close to his home country and to the University of Latvia. In 1961, while congratulating a Swedish student fraternity, he spoke about a distant calling of unceasing and constant spiritual growth, which he referred to as "the future of our entire nation, our native land, our Latvia, through which and only through which we can walk our path to a true, enlightened life, to understanding humanity."

In 1970, Skuja suffered a stroke from which he did not recover. He died on 19 July 1972, in Uppsala.

=== Personal relationships ===
Skuja had many friends in private life. He was particularly valued by fellow Latvians living in Sweden. He was a scientist and a creative artist in his spare time. He was deeply interested in art, music, literature, and archaeology, and rarely missed opportunities to attend musical events. His gentleness, benevolence, and helpfulness were remembered in memorial publications.

In academic life, he maintained a wide correspondence with phycologists from different countries, who often visited him and sent him collected samples for identification, including samples from many scientific expeditions around the world. Skuja's student Antonija Kumsāre considered him "a very accurate, friendly, responsive person who stood out with his great love of work and sense of responsibility." He frequently discussed phycological questions and studied collections of materials made by his colleagues, even when it diverted him from his own studies.

Heinrichs Skuja was married to Vera Skuja (née Vera Kaminska), who was a board member at the Uppsala University, and a long-standing manager of the Uppsala Latvian Library.

== Contributions ==
Skuja published extensive works on algae around the world, accompanied by his own illustrations. He also made important observations on protists from oxygen-lacking environments. An overview of his contributions follows, which primarily involved eukaryotic algae, but he also had an interest in general botany, mycology and lichenology, and specific biotopes such as caves.

=== Algal surveys and monographs of Latvia and Sweden ===
During his work in Latvia (1924–1944), he thoroughly researched the algal flora of the Gulf of Riga and other regions. From the 200 previously known species of Latvian algae, he identified 2100 additional species, and named 50 new species and varieties, and nine new genera, in the process. Some examples are Kylinella latvica, dedicated to the Swedish phycologist Harald Kylin; Ilsteria quadrijuncta, in honor of the first Latvian botanist Jānis Ilsters; and Chlamydomonas rigensis, dedicated to Riga. His studies were summarized in the serial publication Vorarbeiten zu einer Algenflora von Lettland (English: Preliminary work on the algal flora of Latvia), with four volumes published between 1926 and 1928, and the subsequent two-volume Beitrag zur Algenflora Lettlands (English: Contribution to the algal flora of Latvia), between 1934 and 1939. These works made the Latvian algal flora one of the most comprehensively studied worldwide. Around this era, he also authored studies on the flora of the island of Moricsala and the Estonian islands of Saaremaa and Hiiumaa.

Starting in the mid-1940s, while established in Sweden, Skuja intensively described the local algal taxa, as well as bryophytes and aquatic plants. He published several monographs on the phytoplankton taxonomy and biology of Swedish lakes, including three major volumes: one in 1948, based on material from ten lakes of different trophic status around Uppsala; one in 1956, with observations on samples from more than 85 lakes of central Sweden; and one in 1964, his last major work, on the algae and vegetation of the lakes of the Abisko region in northern Sweden. These volumes described a total of 29 new genera and around 450 new species and varieties, illustrated by 171 plates. Most samples were collected by Skuja himself, and by Dr. Gunnar Lohammar and Prof. Wilhelm Rodhe.

During these comprehensive surveys, Skuja separately published smaller detailed observations dedicated to one or a few taxa. Among these were: a description of the Lithoderma freshwater species in Latvia, published in 1925; studies on the genus Furcilia in 1927; discussions about the genus Pleurodiscus (now formally known as Zygogonium) in 1932; three 1958 papers describing novel organisms from sulphur springs, namely the genera Mycochrysis, Metapolytoma and Desmanthos; a description of the sexual reproduction in Chlamydomonas in 1949; a study on the morphology and reproduction of Dinobryon in 1950; a description of Chrysococcus diaphanus in 1950; and a discussion on the discoid shape among members of the Oocystaceae family in 1959.

A main interest since his beginnings was the red algae, also known as rhodophytes. He became the main expert of red algal taxonomy in his time. In the early years, he devoted much effort particularly to the genus Batrachospermum, but all the material collected on this genus was lost during the war. In the period between 1931 and 1944, he published a 12-volume series on red algae titled Untersuchungen über die Rhodophyceen des Süsswassers (English: Studies on the freshwater Rhodophyceae). He discussed the classification of Bangioideae in a 1939 paper. Together with other papers, these studies were meant to be part of an extensive revision on freshwater red algae, for which Skuja was constantly collecting material and even prepared several plates. He had intended to publish this revision during the 1970s. After his death in 1972, one of the rhodophyte specimens brought to him from Lake Pedder was passed to Australian specialist Timothy John Entwisle, who published it along with some of Skuja's notes and illustrations, and named it Batrachospermum diatyches (from Greek di 'two' and atyches 'unfortunate'), partly in reference to the unfortunate passing of Skuja.

=== Protist systematics ===
Skuja discussed evolutionary history and phylogenetic hypotheses in most of his papers. One of his central interests was the phylogeny of algae, partly due to the influence of Czechoslovak taxonomist Adolf Pascher. In a 1938 paper titled Die phylogenetischen Entwicklungsrichtungen bei den Protisten (English: The phylogenetic developmental directions in protists), he wrote extensively on the traits of the different protist phyla, as well as their possible origins and evolutionary relationships. Skuja was the first to differentiate the glaucophytes, a rare and enigmatic group of blue-green algae, into a separate phylum, Glaucophyta. He discussed glaucophyte classification and their evolutionary origin at length in several writings between 1948 and 1964. He also described several new taxa of protozoa, such as the katablepharids.

=== Identification of material from worldwide expeditions ===
Due to his expertise in algal taxonomy, Skuja received material obtained in expeditions around the world, with requests to identify it. In 1937, among materials sent to Skuja by Heinrich Handel-Mazzetti from the Chinese expedition of the Austrian Academy of Sciences, he described more than 700 algal taxa, including six new genera and 36 new species. That same year he also processed algal samples collected during the expeditions to Greece and Anatolia by German-Lithuanian botanist Konstantinas Regelis, consequently describing more than 300 species. In 1936 he received collections from Indian bryologist L. P. Khanna, collected near Rangoon in Burma; his findings, including taxa new to science, were published in 1949 after the war.

In the 1960s he gave short communications on red algae from the 1966 Catherwood Foundation Peruvian-Amazon Expedition, and from Amchitka Island, Alaska, including descriptions of new species. During his last active years, he worked on the algae of New Zealand marshes, from samples delivered by Swedish botanist Hugo Osvald; its manuscript was published in 1976 after his death, and described 389 species in 16 plates.

== Legacy ==
Skuja is regarded as one of the most outstanding and talented phycologists and protistologists of the 20th century. His contributions to the development of phycology have been discussed in several memorial and historical accounts. Several algal genera and species have been named in his honor, such as Skujapelta, Skujaella, Skujaster, Chlamydomonas skujae, Spirogyra skujae, Batrachospermum skujae, Diceras skujae, and Cosmarium skujae. Maximilian Gollerbach, a taxonomist at the Leningrad Botanical Institute of the USSR Academy of Sciences, held him in high regard, and expressed doubts as to whether Skuja would have had the same academic opportunities in the Soviet Union as he did in Sweden.

The museum of the University of Latvia houses an algae herbarium collection with samples and illustrations created by Skuja.
