= Latvians in Chicago =

Latvians immigrated to Chicago in the late 19th century, seeking economic and political change from the hardships faced in the Russian Empire. Similar to Latvian communities in other American cities, Chicago's early Latvian settlers were divided between religious followers and political activists. Following an unsuccessful uprising in Russia's Baltic province in 1905, many political radicals sought refuge in the United States.

Approximately 4,000 Latvians live in Chicago as of 2004.

== Early immigration ==
The first Latvians began to immigrate to the United States in the mid-1800s. By the mid-1890s, a small community of a few hundred Latvians had established a mutual aid society (1892), the Zion Lutheran Church (1893), and various other organizations. Initially, the early Latvian community in Chicago was divided between religious believers and political radicals. The Latvian American religious community was largely Lutheran, with a minority of Roman Catholics. It is difficult to determine how many Latvians immigrated during this time, as many of them were grouped with the Russians or Lithuanians until the 1930 Census.

In 1905, another wave of Latvians, many of them political radicals, fled to the US following a failed uprising in the Baltic Provinces of the Russian Empire. Among this group was Christian Rudowitz, whose case helped set a precedent in extradition law protecting refugees from being extradited for political crimes. Rudowitz's extradition case, attempting to return him to Russia for numerous alleged crimes committed in the Courland village of Benen, attracted great attention; the Chicago Daily Socialist organized the Political Refugee Defense League and condemned what they saw as "czarist tyranny." Socialist Eugene V. Debs, a founding member of the Industrial Workers of the World and five-time presidential candidate for the Socialist Party of America, was a committed defender of Rudowitz. Many progressives also rallied to his cause. Indeed, Rudowitz's rally was so widespread that Jane Addams and Clarence Darrow became directly involved in the effort toward preventing his extradition. Although his extradition was initially approved, when Rudowitz's attorneys appealed to Secretary of State Elihu Root, the extradition was overturned. Many Latvian radicals sympathetic to the Bolshevik cause returned to their homeland after the Russian Revolution in 1917. After Latvia declared independence in 1918, some nationalists also returned.

== After World War II ==
The largest population of Latvians came to the United States after World War II. Latvians endured Soviet occupation due to the schemes following the Molotov-Ribbentrop Pact. They were then occupied by Nazi Germany in the summer of 1941 and became part of Reichskommissariat Ostland following Operation Barbarossa. After that, they faced another Soviet occupation. Hundreds of thousands of Latvians fled in the face of the Soviet advance, leaving everything behind. Moreover, about half of Latvians were not repatriated to the newly established Latvian Soviet Socialist Republic. Many of those who were not repatriated emigrated to the United States, although some also went to Germany and other Commonwealth nations. Latvians spent years in refugee camps all over Western Europe, many fleeing from their homeland in fear of Soviet reprisals for collaboration with German occupiers. Unable to return to their homeland, many came to the United States, where they built churches, schools, community centers, and other cultural institutions. The first Latvian song festival in the United States was held in Chicago in 1953. This festival upheld the tradition of their homeland, celebrating their national unity, and it has continued to this day.

The Latvian people worked hard and started living productive lives. Many Latvian-Americans hold positions in business, academia, government, and the arts. Additionally, many have also served in the US Armed Forces, fighting in numerous conflicts.

Latvia regained its independence in 1991. Since then, an additional several thousand Latvians have come to the US, either for schooling or to immigrate, while many others have left the US, returning to help Latvia's transition to democracy and a market economy.

== Garezers ==
Garezers is a 169-acre (68 ha) property on the banks of Long Lake that serves as a cultural, educational, and recreational center for Latvians in the Chicago area as well as from across the country. The property was founded in 1965 after a group of Latvians purchased an old Girl Scouts camp. The community grew around the camp, bringing in Latvians from all over. The property holds numerous educational programs throughout the summer, including Bērnu Dārzs/ Preschool, Bērnu Nometne/Children's camp, Sagatavošanas Skola/Middle School, and Vasaras Vidusskola/High School. Additionally, they host an annual summer camp/gathering of Latvians 3x3.

On the property is a small subdivision that is almost exclusively Latvian, with street names named after regions in Latvia. There are 40–50 Latvian families living in this area. In addition to the subdivision, there are an additional 100 buildings on the property, including cabins, administrative buildings, a hall where meals are served, classrooms, a library, and cultural museums. Nearby is Dzintari, named after a Latvian neighborhood in Jūrmala, a resort area that contains a beach, docks, pavilions, and a volleyball court.

On Elston Avenue, one can find a social center. It is at the Latviesu Nams that people host social events and fundraisers. There are also language classes, fraternities and sororities, Scouts, a newspaper, a newsletter, and a Latvian Happy Hour Club.

Areas like Garezers give Latvian-Americans a sense of community and help keep the culture alive through language, music, and festivals.

== See also ==
- Latvian Americans
