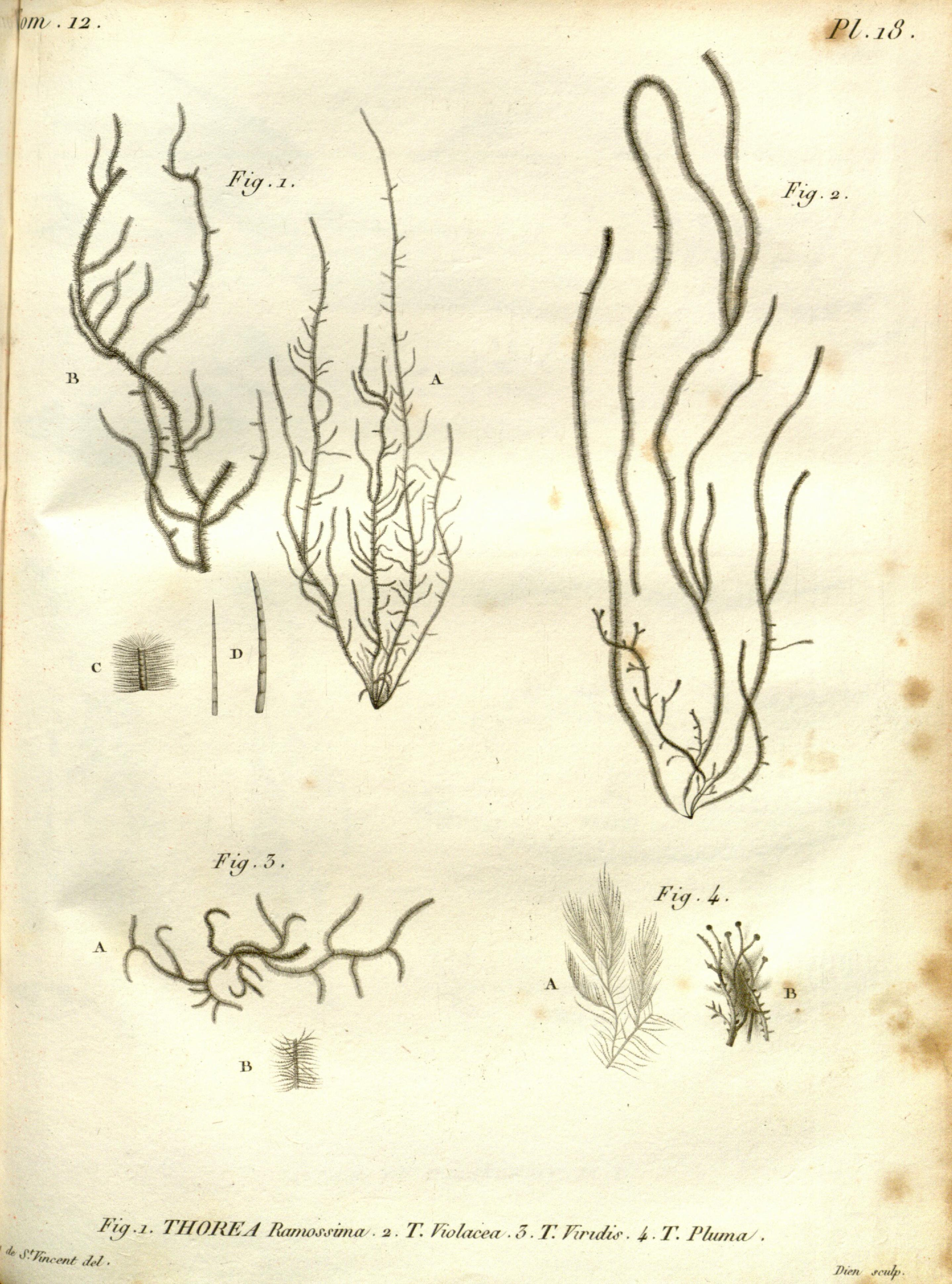
- Illustration of 3 types of Thorea species from 1808

Scientific classification
- Domain: Eukaryota
- Clade: Archaeplastida
- Division: Rhodophyta
- Class: Florideophyceae
- Subclass: Nemaliophycidae
- Order: Thoreales; Müller, K.M., Sherwood, A.R., Pueschel, C.M., Gutell, R.R. & Sheath, R.G. 2002
- Family: Thoreaceae; Hassall, 1845

= Thoreaceae =

Order of algae

Thoreales is an order of red algae belonging to the class Florideophyceae. The order consists only one family, Thoreaceae Hassall, 1845. The family of Thoreaceae was circumscribed by Arthur Hill Hassall in A history of the British freshwater algae, including descriptions of the Desmideae and Diatomaceae in 1845.

The family was originally placed in the Nemaliales order before being transferred to the newly created Batrachospermales order, before being placed later in Thoreales order in 2002. After various species of the family were analysed for the sequences of the genes coding for the large subunit of RUBISCO (rbcL) and the small subunit of rRNA (18S rRNA).

== Description ==
The order is characterized by having freshwater species with multi-axial gametophytes, a uni-axial chantransia stage, and pit plugs with two cap layers, the outer one of which is usually plate-like. It has a multi-axial thalli. They have branched uniseriate filaments as long as 200 cm (79 in) long and 0.5 mm in diameter. They have a colourless axis filament with dense photosynthetic lateral branches. They are normally reddish-brown, olive-green, blue-green to nearly black in colour.

== Distribution ==
The family has cosmopolitan distribution. Species from the family are found in tropical and sub-tropical regions or in temperate warm waters. Thorea is found on several continents (including Australia, and South America), but Nemalionopsis has been only found in Asia and North America.

== Genera ==
As accepted by AlgaeBase;

- Nemalionopsis Skuja, 1934 - 3 spp.
- Thorea Bory, 1808 - 13 spp.

Former genera;Polycoma Pasilot de Bauvois, 1808 and Thorella B. Gaillon, 1883, Both accepted as synonyms of Thorea Bory de Saint-Vincent.
