= Achroonema =

Scientific classification
- Domain: Bacteria
- Kingdom: Bacillati
- Phylum: Cyanobacteriota
- Class: Cyanophyceae
- Order: Pelonematales
- Family: Pelonemataceae
- Genus: Achroonema; Skuja, 1948

Extant species
- See text

Genus of bacteria

Achroonema is a genus of bacteria with uncertain systematics. The family Pelonemataceae was created for colorless, filamentous bacteria found in lake hypolimnia and sulfur springs. It includes the genera Achroonema, Pelonema, Peloploca, and Desmanthos. The genus was described in 1948 by Heinrich Leonhards Skuja.

Species:

- Achroonema angustatum (Koppe) Skuja
- Achroonema articulatum Skuja
- Achroonema gotlandicum Skuja
- Achroonema inaequale Skuja
- Achroonema lentum Skuja
- Achroonema macromeres Skuja
- Achroonema proteiforme Skuja
- Achroonema simplex Skuja
- Achroonema spiroideum Skuja
- Achroonema splendens Skuja
- Achroonema sporogenum Skuja
- Achroonema subsalsum Behre
