= Dzintari Station =

Railway station in Latvia

Dzintari
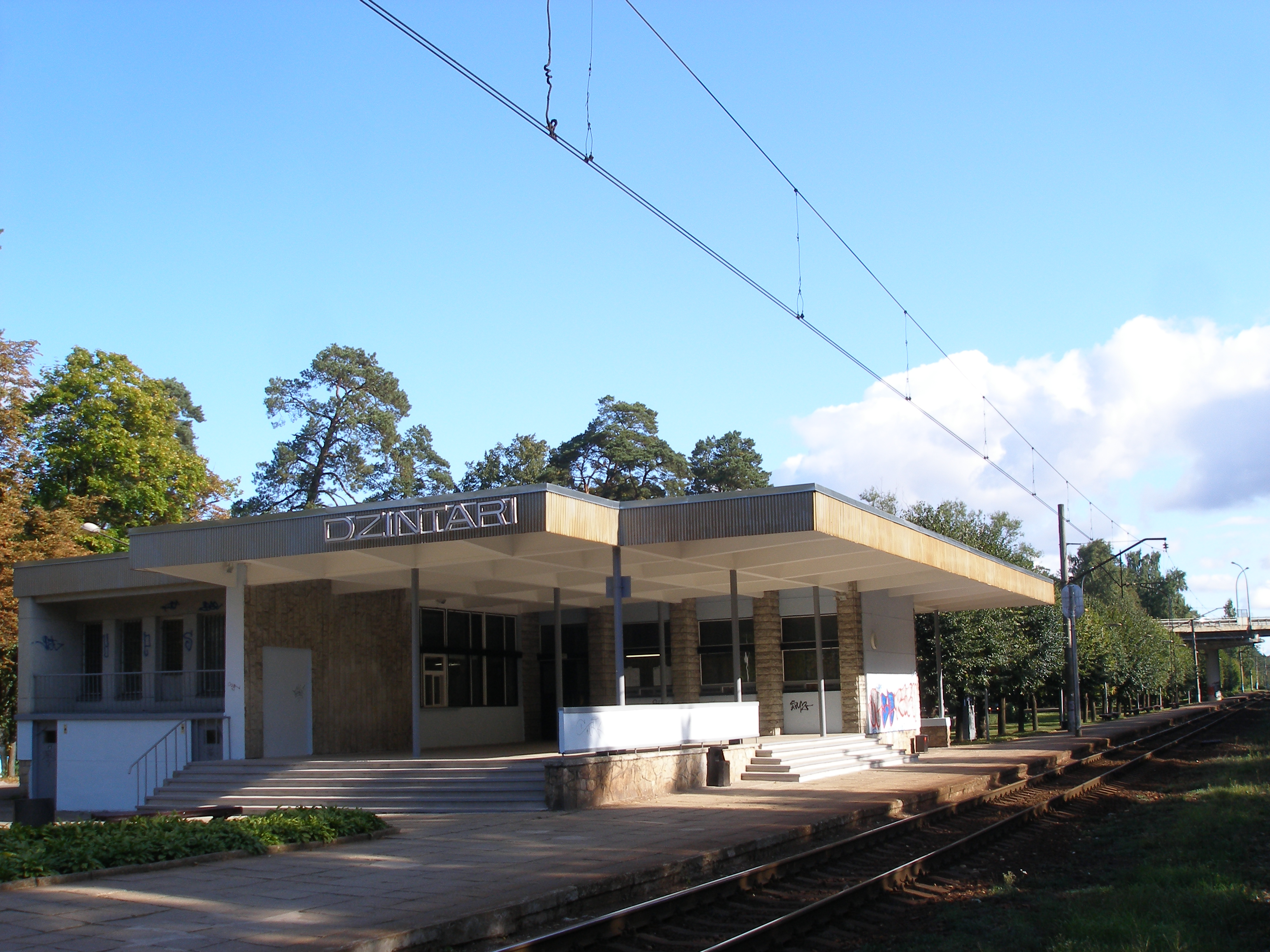

General information
- Location: Edinburgas prospekts 23; Dzintari, Jūrmala; Latvia
- Coordinates: 56°58′25.27″N 23°49′17.71″E
- Platforms: 2
- Tracks: 2

History
- Opened: 1877
- Rebuilt: 1980

Services
Preceding station	LDz	Following station
Majori towards Tukums II	Torņakalns–Tukums II Railway	Bulduri towards Riga
Location

Dzintari Station is a railway station serving the Dzintari neighbourhood of the city of Jūrmala, Latvia. The station is located on the Torņakalns–Tukums II Railway.
