= Majori Station =

Railway station in Majori, Latvia

Majori
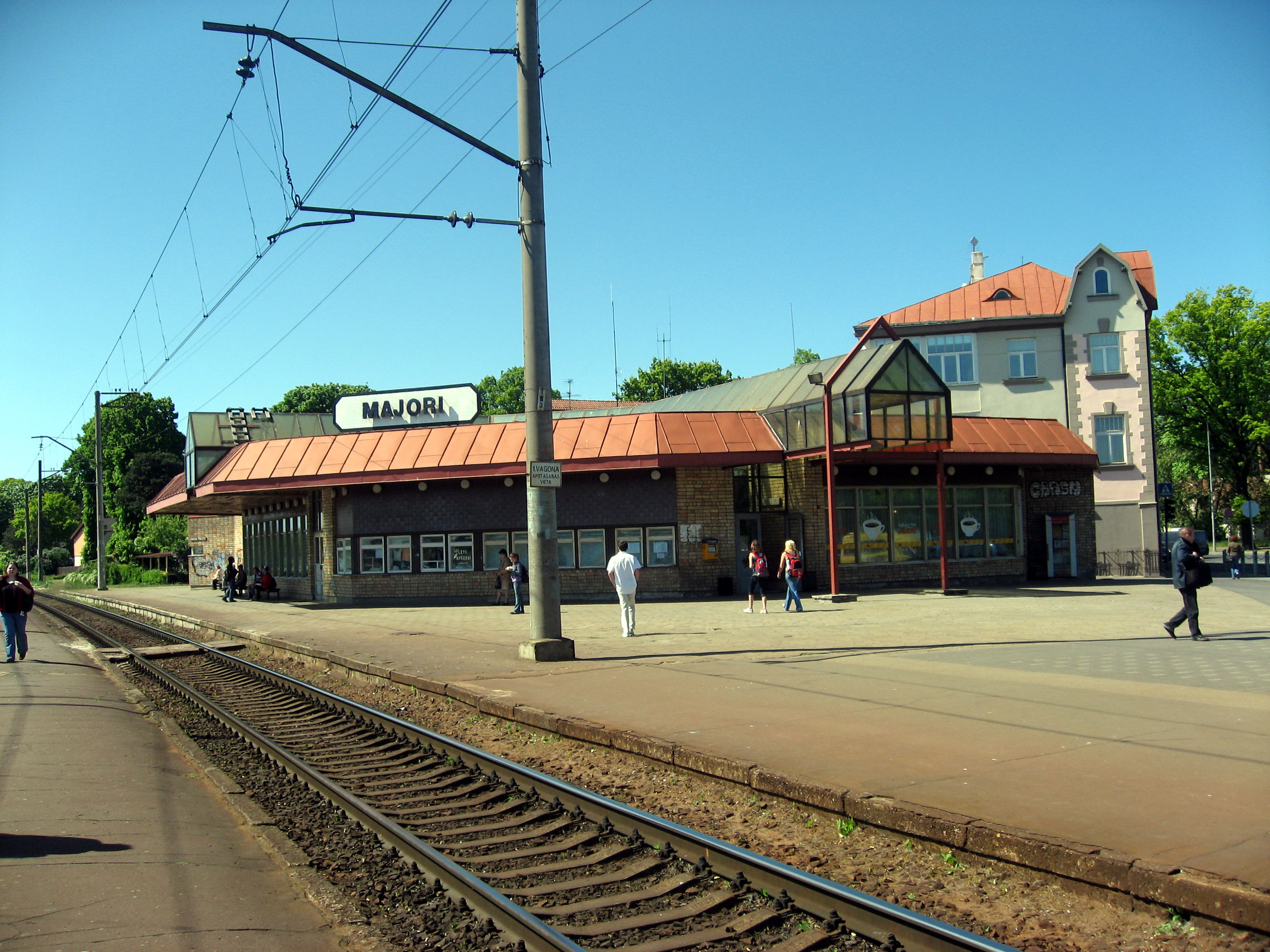

General information
- Location: Lienes iela 2a Majori, Jūrmala; Latvia
- Coordinates: 56°58′17.61″N 23°47′42.35″E
- Owner: Latvijas dzelzceļš (LDz)
- Line: Torņakalns–Tukums II
- Platforms: 2
- Tracks: 2
- Train operators: Vivi

Construction
- Structure type: At-grade

History
- Opened: 1877
- Rebuilt: 1992; 2015
- Former names: Majorenhof (until 1919)

Services
Preceding station	LDz	Following station
Dubulti towards Tukums II	Torņakalns–Tukums II Railway	Dzintari towards Riga
Location

Majori Station is a railway station serving Majori, the central neighbourhood of the resort town of Jūrmala, Latvia. The station is situated on the bank of the Lielupe River on the narrow isthmus between the river and the Gulf of Riga.

The station is located on the Torņakalns – Tukums II Railway. It opened in 1877.

== History ==
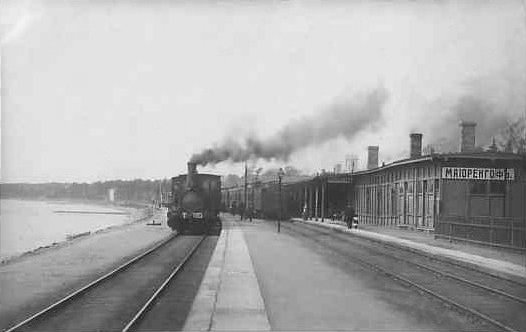
Majorenhof Station, c. 1900.

Majori station opened on 21 September 1877 as one of the original intermediate stops on the new railway line from Riga to Tukums via Jūrmala. The station was known as Majorenhof until 1919.

The original station building was made of wood. It was demolished in 1992 and replaced with current brick station building. In 2015, the station underwent renovations that removed the central boarding platform and added two contemporary side platforms.

== See also ==
- Transport in Latvia
- Rail transport in Latvia
- History of rail transport in Latvia

== Bibliography ==
- Altbergs, T.; Augustāne, K.; Pētersone, I. (2009). Dzelzceļi Latvijā [Railways in Latvia] (in Latvian). Jumava. ISBN 978-9984-38-698-0.
