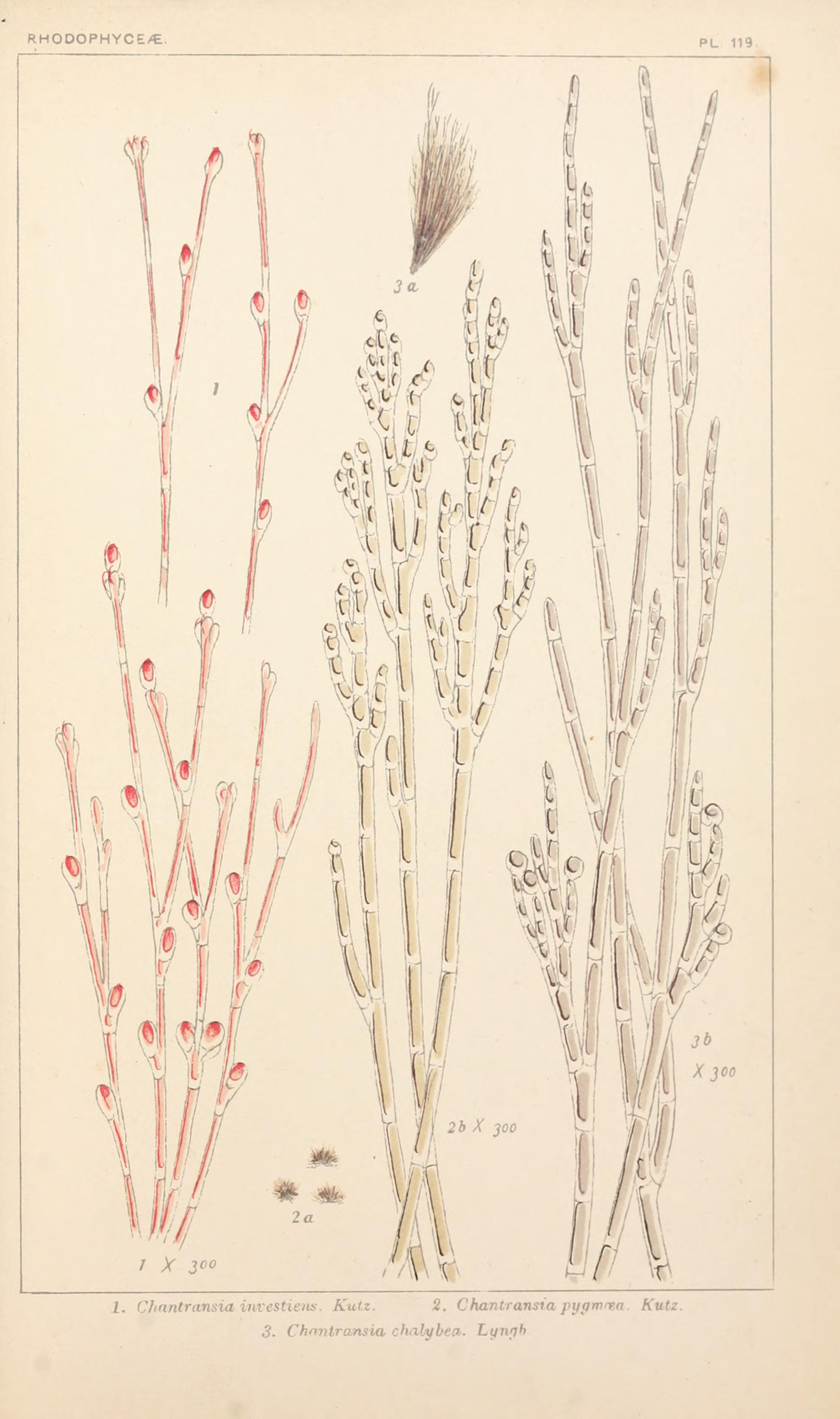

Scientific classification
- Domain: Eukaryota
- Supergroup: Archaeplastida
- Division: Rhodophyta
- Class: Florideophyceae
- Order: Balbianiales; R.G.Sheath & K.M.Müller

= Balbianiales =

Order of algae

Balbianiales is an order of red algae belonging to the class Florideophyceae. The order consists only one family: Balbianiaceae.

Genera:

- Balbiania Sirodot, 1876
- Rhododraparnaldia R.G.Sheath, A.Whittick & K.M.Cole, 1994
