= Kumanoa =

Scientific classification
- Domain: Eukaryota
- Clade: Archaeplastida
- Division: Rhodophyta
- Class: Florideophyceae
- Order: Batrachospermales
- Family: Batrachospermaceae
- Genus: Kumanoa; Entwisle, M.L.Vis, W.B.Chiasson, Necchi & A.R.Sherwood, 2009

Genus of algae

Kumanoa is a genus of Florideophyte red algae belonging to the family Batrachospermaceae.

The genus has cosmopolitan distribution.

== Species ==
- Here is the accepted species of kumanoa:
  1. Kumanoa abilii (M.P.Reis) Necchi & M.L.Vis, 2010
  2. Kumanoa alakaiensis A.R.Sherwood, C.A.Jones & K.Y.Conklin, 2014
  3. Kumanoa amazonensis Necchi & M.L.Vis, 2010
  4. Kumanoa ambigua (Montagne) Entwisle, M.L.Vis, W.B.Chiasson, Necchi & A.R.Sherwood, 2009
  5. Kumanoa americana (R.G.Sheath, M.L.Vis & K.M.Cole) M.L.Vis, Necchi, W.B.Chiasson & Entwisle, 2012
  6. Kumanoa australica (Entwisle & Foard) Entwisle, M.L.Vis, W.B.Chiasson, Necchi & A.R.Sherwood, 2009
  7. Kumanoa balakrishnanii (Chaugule) E.K.Ganesan & J.A.West, 2013
  8. Kumanoa capensis (Starmach ex Necchi & Kumano) Necchi & Vis, 2010
  9. Kumanoa celebes E.T.Johnston, N.Buhari & M.L.Vis, 2014
  10. Kumanoa cipoensis (Kumano & Necchi) Entwisle, M.L.Vis, W.B.Chiasson, Necchi & A.R.Sherwood, 2009
  11. Kumanoa curvata (Z.-X.Shi) M.L.Vis, Necchi, W.B.Chiasson & Entwisle, 2012
  12. Kumanoa dasyphylla (Skuja ex Balakrishnan & B.B.Chaugule) E.K.Ganesan & J.A.West, 2013
  13. Kumanoa deminuta (Entwisle & Foard) Entwisle, M.L.Vis, W.B.Chiasson, Necchi & A.R.Sherwood, 2009
  14. Kumanoa equisetoidea (Kumano & Necchi) Entwisle, M.L.Vis, W.B.Chiasson, Necchi & A.R.Sherwood, 2009
  15. Kumanoa faroensis (Kumano & W.A.Bowden-Kerby) M.L.Vis, Necchi, W.B.Chiasson & Entwisle, 2012
  16. Kumanoa gibberosa (Kumano) Necchi & M.L.Vis, 2010
  17. Kumanoa globospora (Israelson) Entwisle, M.L.Vis, W.B.Chiasson, Necchi & A.R.Sherwood, 2009
  18. Kumanoa gracillima (West & G.S.west) Entwisle, M.L.Vis, W.B.Chiasson, Necchi & A.R.Sherwood, 2009
  19. Kumanoa gudjewga M.L.Vis, Necchi, W.B.Chiasson & Entwisle, 2012
  20. Kumanoa guyanensis Entwisle, M.L.Vis, W.B.Chiasson, Necchi & A.R.Sherwood, 2009
  21. Kumanoa henriquesiana (Reis) Necchi & M.L.Vis, 2012
  22. Kumanoa hirosei (Kumano & Ratnasabapathy) L.M.Liao, 2010
  23. Kumanoa holtonii M.L.Vis, Necchi, W.B.Chiasson & Entwisle, 2012
  24. Kumanoa intorta (C.-C.Jao) Entwisle, M.L.Vis, W.B.Chiasson, Necchi & A.R.Sherwood, 2009
  25. Kumanoa iriomotensis (Kumano) M.L.Vis, Necchi, W.B.Chiasson & Entwisle, 2012
  26. Kumanoa iyengarii (Skuja ex Balakrishnan & B.B.Chaugule) E.K.Ganesan & J.A.West, 2013
  27. Kumanoa jolyi (Necchi) Necchi & Vis, 2010
  28. Kumanoa khaoluangensis (W.Chankaew, Y.Peerapornpisal & Kumano) Necchi & M.L.Vis, 2021
  29. Kumanoa kushiroensis (Kumano & Ohsaki) Nan, Feng & Xie, 2015
  30. Kumanoa kylinii (Balakrishnan & B.B.Chaugule) E.K.Ganesan & J.A.West, 2013
  31. Kumanoa louisianae (Skuja) Entwisle, M.L.Vis, W.B.Chiasson, Necchi & A.R.Sherwood, 2009
  32. Kumanoa lusitanica (Reis) Necchi & M.L.Vis, 2012
  33. Kumanoa mahabaleshwarensis (M.S.Balakrishnan & B.B.Chaugule) E.K.Ganesan & J.A.West, 2013
  34. Kumanoa mahlacensis (Kumano & W.A.Bowden-Kerby) M.L.Vis, Necchi, W.B.Chiasson & Entwisle, 2012
  35. Kumanoa montagnei Entwisle, M.L.Vis, W.B.Chiasson, Necchi & A.R.Sherwood, 2009
  36. Kumanoa nodiflora (Montagne) Entwisle, M.L.Vis, W.B.Chiasson, Necchi & A.R.Sherwood, 2009
  37. Kumanoa nothocladoidea (Xie & Shi) Nan, Feng & Xie, 2015
  38. Kumanoa novaecaledonensis M.L.Vis, Necchi, W.B.Chiasson & Entwisle, 2012
  39. Kumanoa procarpa (Skuja) Entwisle, M.L.Vis, W.B.Chiasson, Necchi & A.R.Sherwood, 2009
  40. Kumanoa pseudocarpa (Reis) Necchi & M.L.Vis, 2012
  41. Kumanoa skujana (Necchi) Necchi & Vis, 2010
  42. Kumanoa spermatiophora (M.L.Vis & Sheath) Entwisle, M.L.Vis, W.B.Chiasson, Necchi & A.R.Sherwood, 2009
  43. Kumanoa tabagatensis (Kumano & W.A.Bowden-Kerby) M.L.Vis, Necchi, W.B.Chiasson & Entwisle, 2012
  44. Kumanoa tiomanensis (Kumano & Rathnasabathy) Necchi & M.L.Vis, 2012
  45. Kumanoa torsiva Nan, Feng & Xie, 2015
  46. Kumanoa tortuosa (Kumano) E.T.Johnston, 2014
  47. Kumanoa transitoria (Xie & Shi) Nan, Feng & Xie, 2015
  48. Kumanoa umamaheswararaoi (Baluswami & Babu) E.K.Ganesan & J.A.West, 2013
  49. Kumanoa virgatodecaisneana (Sirodot) Entwisle, M.L.Vis, W.B.Chiasson, Necchi & A.R.Sherwood, 2009
  50. Kumanoa vittata (Entwisle & Foard) Entwisle, M.L.Vis, W.B.Chiasson, Necchi & A.R.Sherwood, 2009
  51. Kumanoa woitapensis (Kumano) Necchi & M.L.Vis, 2012
  52. Kumanoa zeylanica (Skuja ex Balakrishnan & B.B.Chaugule) E.K.Ganesan & J.A.West, 2013
