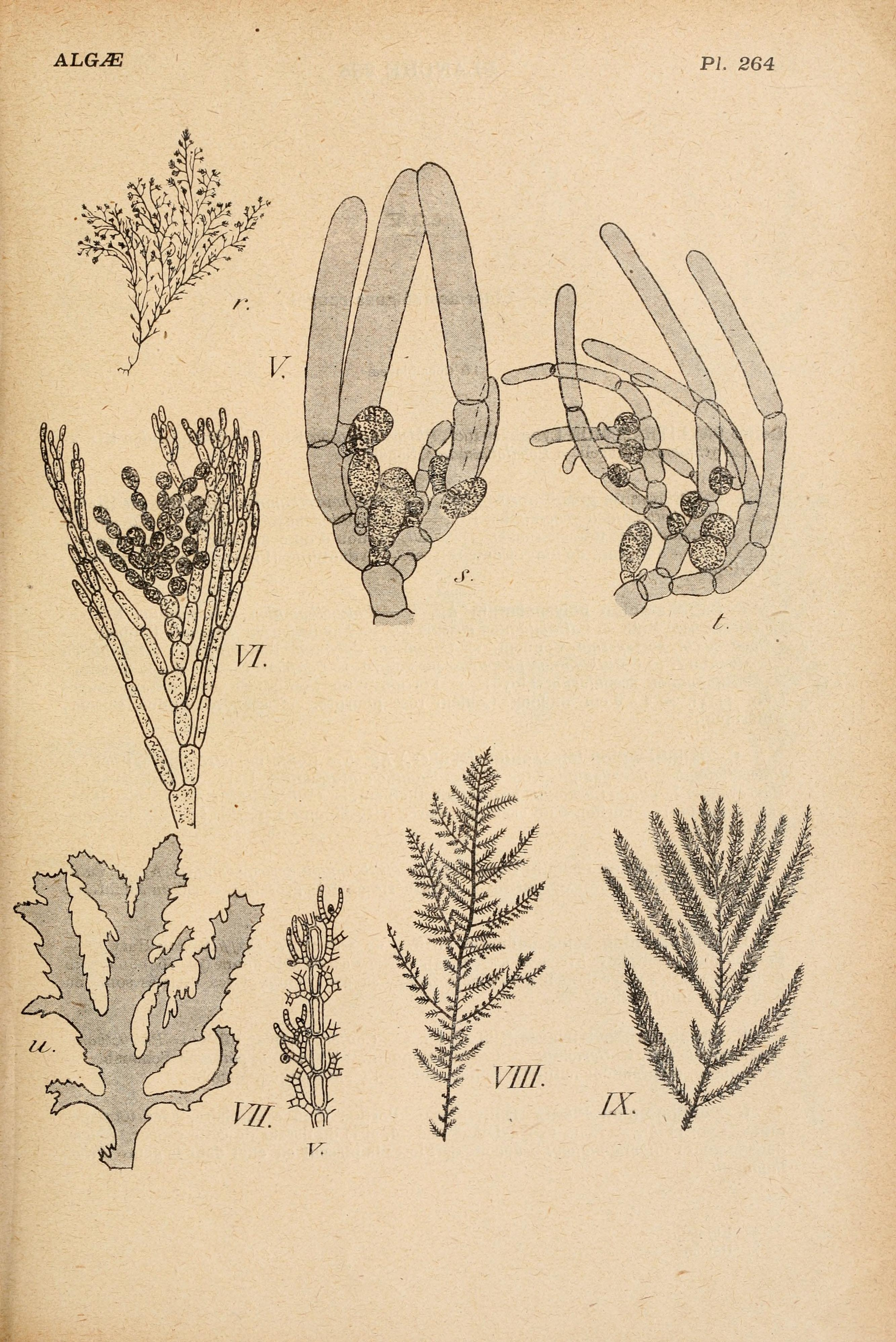

Scientific classification
- Clade: Archaeplastida
- Division: Rhodophyta
- Class: Florideophyceae
- Order: Balliales; H.-G.Choi, G.T.Kraft, & G.W.Saunders

= Balliales =

Order of algae

Balliales is an order of red algae belonging to the class Florideophyceae. The order consists only one family, Balliaceae. with only one genus - Ballia Harvey.

The genus of Balliales was circumscribed by William Henry Harvey in J. Bot. (Hooker) vol.2 on page 191 in 1840.

The genus name of Balliales is in honour of Anne Elizabeth Ball (1808–1872), who was an Irish botanist, amateur algologist, and botanical illustrator.

== Species ==
As accepted by AlgaeBase;

- Ballia callitricha (C.Agardh) Kützing
- Ballia chilensis Decaisne
- Ballia crassa (C.Agardh) Kützing
- Ballia nana Kraft & G.W.Saunders
- Ballia pennoides Wollaston
- Ballia sertularioides (Suhr) Papenfuss
- Ballia vestium Harvey
