= Jean Thore =

French botanist and physician

Jean Thore (13 October 1762, Montaut-les-Créneaux – 27 April 1823, Dax) was a French botanist and medical doctor who practiced medicine in the town of Dax.

In 1808 Bory de Saint-Vincent circumscribed the algae genus of Thorea in his honor; the genus Thoreochloa Holub also bears his name. This is a synonym of Arrhenatherum.

== Published works ==
- Essai d'une chloris du Département des Landes, 1803.
- Promenade sur les côtes du golfe de Gascogne, 1810.
