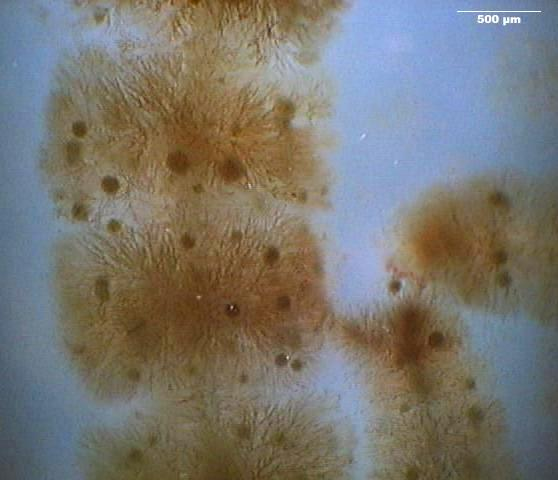
- Batrachospermum gelatinosum

Scientific classification
- Domain: Eukaryota
- Supergroup: Archaeplastida
- Division: Rhodophyta
- Class: Florideophyceae
- Order: Batrachospermales
- Family: Batrachospermaceae
- Genus: Batrachospermum; Roth 1797:36

Type species
- Batrachospermum gelatinosum

= Batrachospermum =

Genus of red algae

Batrachospermum is a genus of red algae from the family Batrachospermaceae. Due to its complex biological life cycle, descriptions of the taxon typically focus on gametophytes, while sporophytes, i.e., carposporophytes, are filamentous structures growing on the gametophyte, on which they depend. Independently living sporophytes have sometimes been described as separate species within the genus Chantransia. Additionally, differences may occur in the descriptions of the genus due to variations in taxonomic approaches, as new taxonomic techniques, as with other algae, result in changes in the assignment of individual species to the genus Batrachospermum. The genus is cosmopolitan, and its representatives are found in freshwater environments, mainly rivers, and less frequently in standing waters. These plants have thalli in the form of gelatinous-coated filaments.

== Name ==
The etymology of the scientific name (Greek: βάτραχος – frog, σπέρμα – seed) refers to its gelatinous appearance resembling frog spawn. The Polish name, żabirośl (frogseed) also alludes to this appearance.

== Systematics and variability ==
The genus Batrachospermum was established by Albrecht Wilhelm Roth at the end of the 18th century, described in his work Bemerkungen über das Studium der cryptogamischen Wassergewächse (Remarks on the study of cryptogamic aquatic plants). Previously, botanists described these algae as species belonging to the genera Conferva (now not recognized, with its representatives mainly classified under the genus Cladophora) – Conferva gelatinosa or Conferva nodosa (Carl Linnaeus), or Charales – Chara batrachosperma (Friedrich Wilhelm Weiss). Initially, Roth used the name Chara gelatinosa. The binomial nomenclature was first used in 1801 by Augustin Pyramus de Candolle, who distinguished three species: B. gelatinosum, B. simplex, and B. nigricans. Thus, B. gelatinosum became the type species (holotype) of its genus, with the basionym being Conferva gelatinosa (L. 1753: 1166).

In older systems (e.g., Engler system), the genera Batrachospermum and Chantransia were classified under the family Helminthocladiaceae in the order Nemalionales. Currently, the family Batrachospermaceae and the order Batrachospermales are recognized. According to some systematic proposals, this order is monotypic, and families distinguished within it, such as Lemaneaceae, should be synonymized with Batrachospermaceae.

Depending on the systematic approach, there are from several dozen to several hundred species within the genus. The development of molecular phylogenetics has challenged the traditional morphology and anatomy-based taxonomy. According to these studies, the genus Batrachospermum is paraphyletic – nested within its clade are genera such as Lemanea, Nothocladus, Paralemanea, Petrohua, Psilosiphon scoparius, Sirodotia, and Tuomeya. In order to maintain the genus as a monophyletic taxon in a broad sense, all the above-mentioned genera are included in Batrachospermum, or in a narrow sense, only the type species, B. gelatinosum, is included, with its recognized form (sometimes elevated to the species rank) B. gelatinosum f. spermatoinvolucrum (M.L.Vis & R.G.Sheath). In the narrow sense, the previously distinguished sections are elevated to the rank of genera, for example, the Hybrida section (previously distinguished as the Contorta section) is raised to the genus Kumanoa. According to one proposal, the paraphyletic genus Batrachospermum can be divided into the following sections:

- Acarposporophytum (Batrachospermum brasiliense)
- Aristata (Batrachospermum cayennense)
- Batrachospermum (Batrachospermum gelatinosum)
- Gonimopropagulum (Batrachospermum breutelli)
- Helminthoidea (Batrachospermum arcuatum, Batrachospermum boryanum, Batrachospermum confusum, Batrachospermum heterocorticum, Batrachospermum involutum)
- Macrospora (Batrachospermum macrosporum)
- Setacea (Batrachospermum atrum, Batrachospermum puiggarianum)
- Turfosa (Batrachospermum turfosum)
- Virescentia (Batrachospermum elegans, Batrachospermum helminthosum)

Additionally, there is a provisionally designated Australasian group, which is paraphyletic and from which the genera Nothocladus and Petrohua, as well as the Setacea section (Batrachospermum antipodites, Batrachospermum campyloclonum, Batrachospermum discors, Batrachospermum kraftii, Batrachospermum pseudogelatinosum, Batrachospermum theaquum, Batrachospermum wattsii), originate.

After the separation of the genus Kumanoa, the following species formerly classified under Batrachospermum are transferred to this genus: B. australicum (Kumanoa australica), B. breviarticulatum (Kumanoa breviarticulata), B. cipoense (Kumanoa cipoensis), B. deminutum (Kumanoa deminuta), B. equisetoideum (Kumanoa equisetoidea), B. globosporum (Kumanoa globospora), B. gracillimum (Kumanoa gracillima), B. intortum (Kumanoa intorta), B. louisianae (Kumanoa louisianae), B. nodiflorum (Kumanoa nodiflora), B. procarpum (Kumanoa procarpa), B. spermatiophorum (Kumanoa spermatiophora), B. virgatodecaisneanum (Kumanoa virgatodecaisneana), B. vittatum (Kumanoa vittata).

After considering almost all of these changes, in the AlgaeBase system, in addition to those mentioned above, the following species were verified as of Autumn 2011 (others appearing in publications are either considered synonyms of others or not yet verified):

- Batrachospermum androinvolucrum
- Batrachospermum antiquum
- Batrachospermum azeredoi
- Batrachospermum bakarense
- Batrachospermum beraense
- Batrachospermum carpocontortum
- Batrachospermum carpoinvolucrum
- Batrachospermum crispatum
- Batrachospermum curvatum
- Batrachospermum cylindrocellulare
- Batrachospermum dasyphyllum
- Batrachospermum debile
- Batrachospermum deminutum
- Batrachospermum desikacharyi
- Batrachospermum diatyches
- Batrachospermum equisetifolium
- Batrachospermum ferreri
- Batrachospermum fluitans
- Batrachospermum gombakense
- Batrachospermum guianense
- Batrachospermum gulbenkianum
- Batrachospermum henriquesianum
- Batrachospermum heteromorphum
- Batrachospermum hirosei
- Batrachospermum hondongense
- Batrachospermum hypogynum
- Batrachospermum iriomotense
- Batrachospermum iyengarii
- Batrachospermum keratophytum (according to some molecular studies, despite minor morphological distinctiveness, it should be included in the species B. turfosum)
- Batrachospermum kushiroense
- Batrachospermum kylinii
- Batrachospermum latericium
- Batrachospermum lochmodes
- Batrachospermum longiarticulatum
- Batrachospermum longipedicellatum
- Batrachospermum luisitanicum
- Batrachospermum mahabaleshwarense
- Batrachospermum mahlacense
- Batrachospermum microspermum
- Batrachospermum nechochoense
- Batrachospermum nonocense
- Batrachospermum nova-guineense
- Batrachospermum orthostichum
- Batrachospermum periplocum
- Batrachospermum prominens
- Batrachospermum pseudocarpum
- Batrachospermum pulchrum
- Batrachospermum ranuliferum
- Batrachospermum sinensis
- Batrachospermum skujae
- Batrachospermum tabagatenense
- Batrachospermum tapirense
- Batrachospermum terawhiticum
- Batrachospermum tiomanense
- Batrachospermum torridum
- Batrachospermum torsivum
- Batrachospermum tortuosum
- Batrachospermum transtaganum
- Batrachospermum trichocontortum
- Batrachospermum trichofurcatum
- Batrachospermum triste
- Batrachospermum turgidum
- Batrachospermum vagum var. undulato-pedicellatum (while the proper species B. vagum was considered a synonym of B. turfosum)
- Batrachospermum vogesiacum
- Batrachospermum woitapense
- Batrachospermum zeylanicum
- Batrachospermum zostericola

One of the more commonly reported species in publications, B. moniliforme, is considered a synonym of B. gelatinosum in this system.

== Morphology ==
=== Habit ===
The thallus is filamentous, covered with a slippery, gelatinous sheath, with mucilage primarily composed of oligosaccharides. The degree of gelatinosity of the thallus varies between species. Species occurring in swifter currents typically have a more compact form, while those in slower currents have a looser form.

The gametophyte thallus is filamentous, up to 40 cm long (usually shorter in many species), typically branching monopodially to dichotomy. Downward-growing filaments form the covering cortex around the central filament, sometimes resembling rhizoids in the lower part. Nodes occur between the cells of the main filament, from which lateral filaments grow radially. From the cortex filaments situated on the internodes, intercortical filaments also arise. Lateral cortical filaments are more branched and longer than intercortical ones. Younger thalli usually form broader branches (up to 350 μm wide) than older ones (100–200 μm).

The color varies, ranging from brownish, olive, purple, gray to bluish-green.

The sporophyte stage is crustose, consisting of large basal cells from which poorly branched filaments grow upwards.

=== Anatomy ===
The cells of the main filament are elongated (150–200 μm) in the shape of a cylinder. The cells of the cortical filaments are lens-shaped, ellipsoidal, up to 30 μm in length. Each cell contains several ribbon-shaped chloroplasts without pyrenoids. The chloroplasts contain a single fragmented thylakoid. Among the metabolites, in addition to substances typical for all red algae (such as red algal starch), trehalose is present. The number of chromosomes (n) varies, depending on the species, ranging from 2 to 22.

=== Structures for propagation ===
Several species produce monospores, but usually carpospores are formed. Spermatangia (male gametangia) are spherical (4–8 μm in diameter) and colorless, usually clustered at the end of filaments, sometimes also on branches carrying carpogonia. Male gametes are non-motile gametangia. Female gametes – carpogonia – are essentially equivalent to oogonia. The hair of the carpogonium is club-shaped. Carposporophytes are roughly spherical, formed by gonimoblasts, with carposporangia at the tips (lacking cystocarp). In Batrachospermum breutelli, the carposporophyte produces multicellular diaspores that detach. Spores do not have any endosporic features.

== Ecology ==
In defining environmental requirements, taxonomic controversies pose a certain difficulty. It happens that a particular species is considered by ecologists as an indicator of a certain environmental condition, while another species is considered an indicator of a different condition. However, both of these species may turn out to be synonymous to each other as a result of molecular studies.

=== Geographical distribution ===
The genus is freshwater and cosmopolitan. Since red algae are mostly found in saltwater environments, in some regions, representatives of Batrachospermum are the most common riverine red algae. This is the case with Batrachospermum gelatinosum, which was found in 13% of samples collected from North American streams. In the streams of the upper São Francisco basin in Brazil, various species of Batrachospermum, especially in the thallus stage, are one of the most common taxonomic groups of macroalgae. In Poland, occurrences are scattered throughout the country, with more frequent sightings in the Pomerania region and in the Silesian-Lesser Poland Uplands.

Some species, such as B. gelatinosum, are found on all continents (except Antarctica), while others are endemic (e.g., Batrachospermum spermatiophorum known only from one stream on Maui Island), although according to some proposals, it may be transferred to the genus Kumanoa.

=== Habitat ===
Species of Batrachospermum inhabit the benthos of moderately to swiftly flowing waters (average flow velocity – 19 cm/s) with a substrate of gravelly or stony bottoms, and even in springs. They are rarely found in standing waters. The substrate to which they are attached can vary from stones to macrophytes, especially among different species. Representatives are often rheophiles or rheobionts and live in waters with a wide range of current velocities, but with averages exceeding 40 cm/s (e.g., Batrachospermum boryanum), or even 50 cm/s (B. keratophytum, which also occurs in ponds). Due to the high oxygenation typical of such conditions, they exhibit characteristics of organisms highly tolerant to oxygen, and a decrease in oxygen concentration results in a decrease in respiratory rate. These conditions favor rapid water self-purification, especially from organic pollutants, so these species are recognized as saprobic systems (B. vagum) or saproxenes (B. moniliforme, also known as B. gelatinosum), although the latter species may also indicate γ-mesosaprobic waters. They mainly occur in waters with low mineral content. Unlike most algae, they do not assimilate carbon bound in carbonate ions, so they require dissolved CO_{2}. As a result, despite their ability to occur in waters with different pH levels, they are more common in acidic waters, where such a form of inorganic carbon predominates. Some representatives (B. keratophytum, B. vagum – both species sometimes considered synonyms of B. turfosum) occur in dystrophic waters, with low transparency, but they can also occur in swiftly flowing waters. Even then, however, they are more common in streams with water rich in humic compounds – more acidic and darker than average. Also, representatives of some other species have a wide range of tolerance to sunlight, pH, and other parameters. This applies especially to B. gelatinosum, the only representative of the genus occurring up to the tundra zone, and described under synonymous names (B. delicatulum) also from tropical zones. This species is sometimes described as typical for both eutrophic and oligotrophic waters.

Thallus and gametophyte stages can occur in different habitat conditions. It happens that only one of these generations is observed in certain regions.

=== Interspecies interactions ===
The thalli of Batrachospermum are a food source for aquatic invertebrates, including amphipods, snails, and aquatic insect larvae. In some studies, they have been found in the gut content of almost half of the examined individuals.

The silk-like secretions that bind the threads of Batrachospermum are used to build shelters by some chironomidic larvae. Shelters made from different species of Batrachospermum have slightly different structures.

The gelatinous sheath serves as a habitat for periphytic algae, such as Chrysodesmis gloeophila. Some algae, such as the red algae Balbiania and Sirodotia, can also grow directly on the gelatinous thalli of Batrachospermum.

== Life cycle ==
The Batrachospermum, like other red algae, undergoes an alternation of generations. The life cycle involves one haploid generation of gametophyte (typically described as the actual individual of Batrachospermum) and two diploid generations of sporophytes – carposporophyte and Chantransia (or pseudochantransia).

The Chantransia stage is annual. Chantransia can produce monospores or, through meiotic division, produce gametophyte thalli growing on it, without releasing tetraspores. Gametophytes live for a short period – from late autumn to early spring in tropical regions or slightly longer in temperate zones. However, in certain conditions, they can also be perennial. The production of gametophytes may be associated with photoperiodism. Gametophytes produce male gametes – spermatozoids and female gametes – carpogonia (which are essentially identical to oogonia). Some species (e.g., Batrachospermum boryanum) are dioecious, while others are monoicous. In some species (e.g., B. delicatulum, also known as B. gelatinosum), both monoicious and dioecious individuals occur. Both types of gametes are non-motile – spermatozoids are released into the water and carried by its movement, while carpogonia remain on the parent plant, germinating into carposporophytes after fertilization. Carposporophytes, originating from the zygote, are diploids. Due to their inconspicuous appearance and occurrence on gametophytes, they were once considered parasites. However, sometimes they detach from the gametophyte, serving as diaspores. Carposporophytes produce carpospores released into the water, from which the Chantransia stage germinates. An exception is Batrachospermum brasiliense, in which there is no carposporophyte, and the Chantransia stage grows directly from the fertilized carpogonium. Since the gametophyte grows on the Chantransia, the carposporophyte on the gametophyte, and the carpospores can germinate on the parent plant, their common body can be considered a kind of chimera.

For many years, it was believed that the only diploid stage in the development of Batrachospermum is the zygote, which immediately undergoes meiosis, making the carposporophyte haplont. Such information is still presented in relatively modern studies, despite the fact that since the mid-20th century, it has been discovered that successive species representing this life cycle model (supposedly represented by the genus Nemalion) actually have a model similar to most other red algae (typified by Polysiphonia). Additional misunderstandings arose from the fact that after meiosis in Chantransia (or pseudochantransia), only one cell (meiospore) gives rise to a new individual, while the rest degenerate, which is unusual in algae. Moreover, the meiospore is not released but germinates on the parent plant. It was only in the late 1960s and early 1970s that it was proven that the nuclei of Batrachospermum and Lemanea gametophytes contain half of the DNA of the nuclei of individuals from the supposed genus Pesudochantransia.

== Uses ==
Unlike some marine red algae, Batrachospermum is not used in cooking. There are few reports of the anti-inflammatory properties of B. atrum used in folk medicine at the foothills of the Himalayas (Arunachal Pradesh).

Due to its environmental requirements, representatives of this genus found in Poland are considered when determining the River Macrophyte Index, with values of W=6 (indicating a preference for mesotrophic waters) and L=2 (indicating an average range of ecological tolerance).
