= Majori =

Neighbourhood of Jūrmala, Latvia

Coordinates: 56°58′N 23°48′E

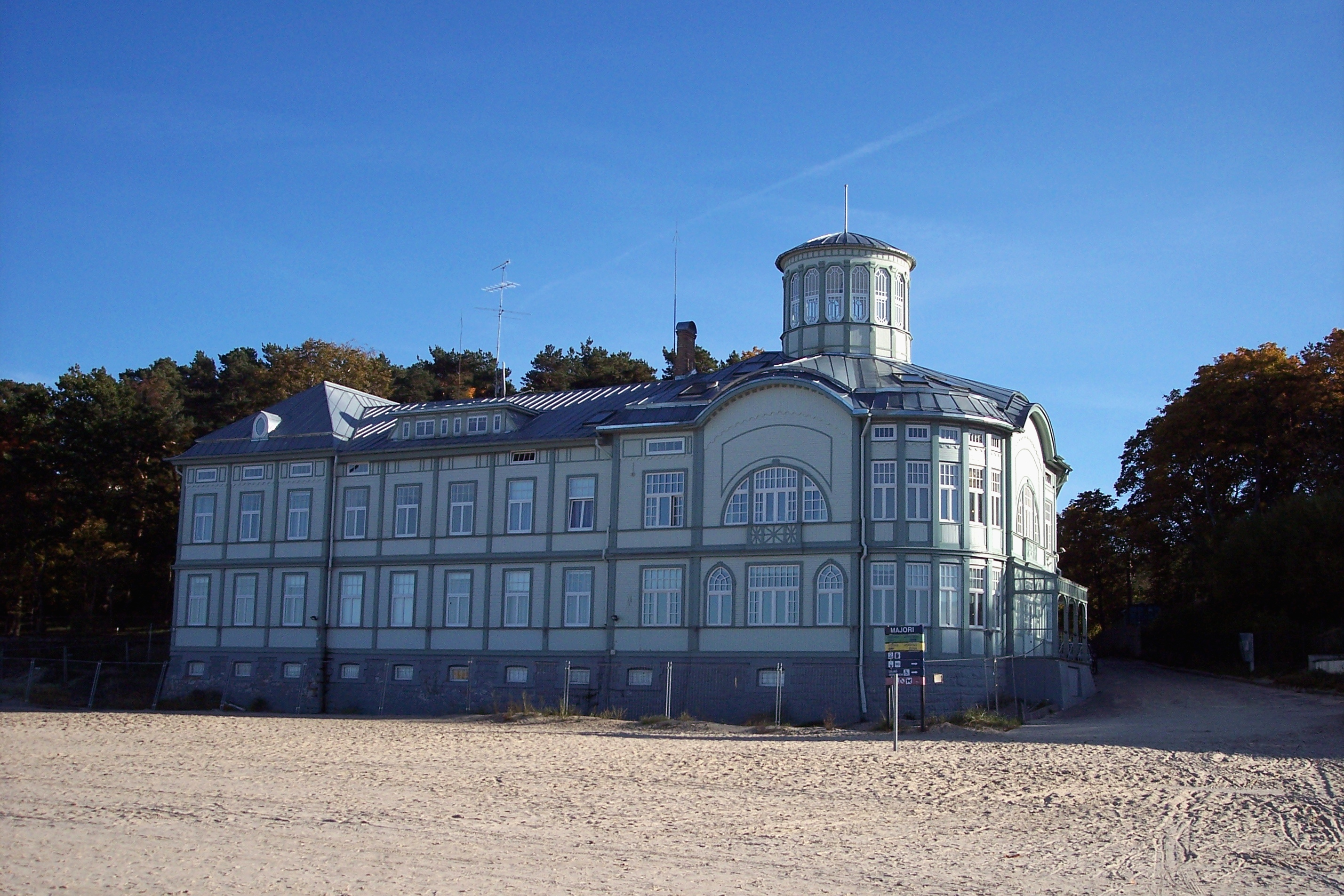
- The former Emīlija Rācene beach house, built in 1916.

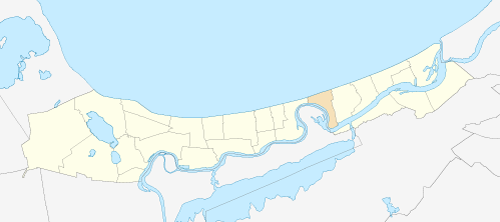
- Location in Jūrmala
- Country: Latvia
- City: Jūrmala

Area
  - Total: 2.5 km^{2} (0.97 sq mi)
- Elevation: 3 m (9.8 ft)

Population (2008)
  - Total: 3,913
  - Density: 1,565.2/km^{2} (4,054/sq mi)

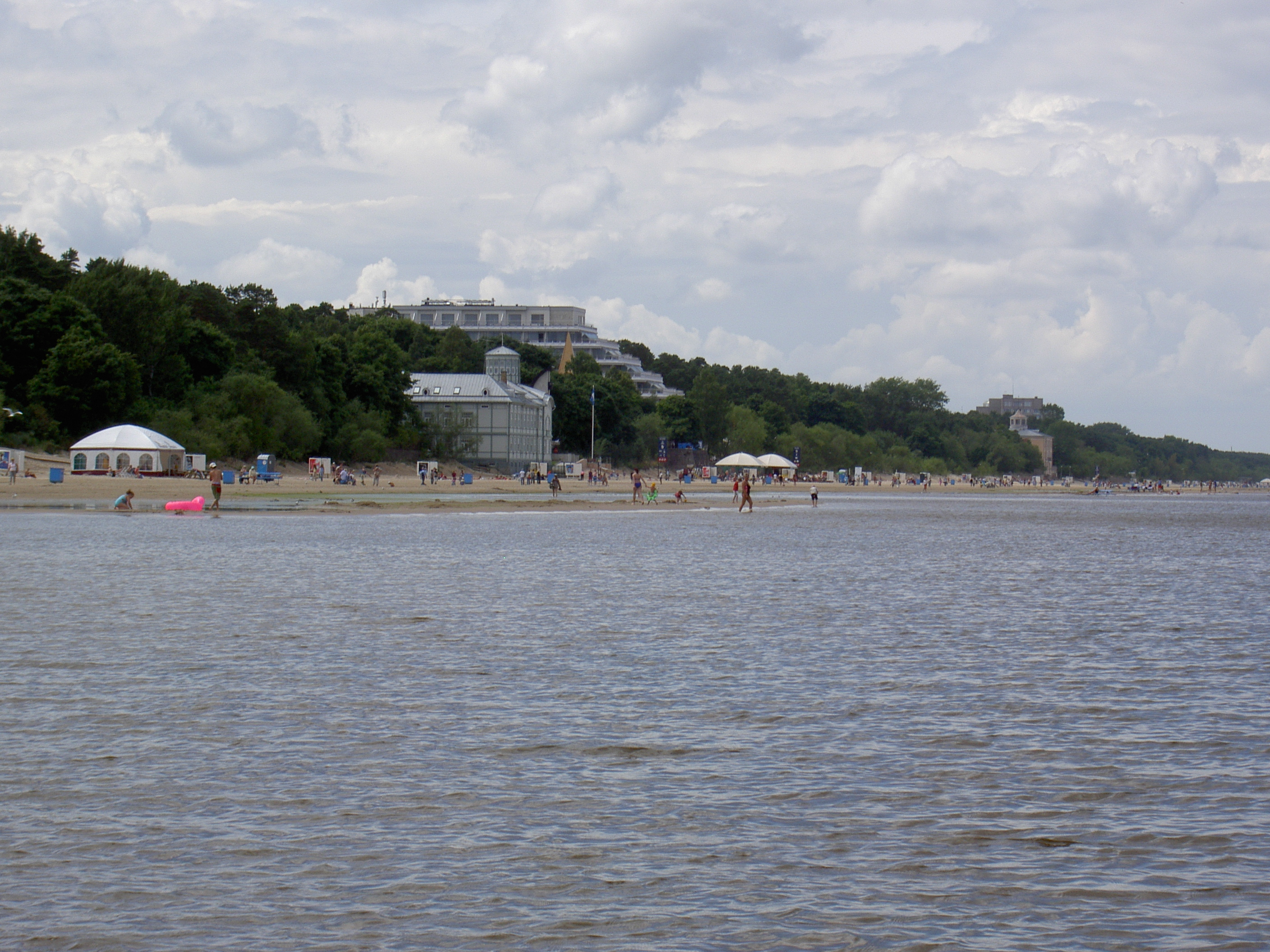
The beach at Majori

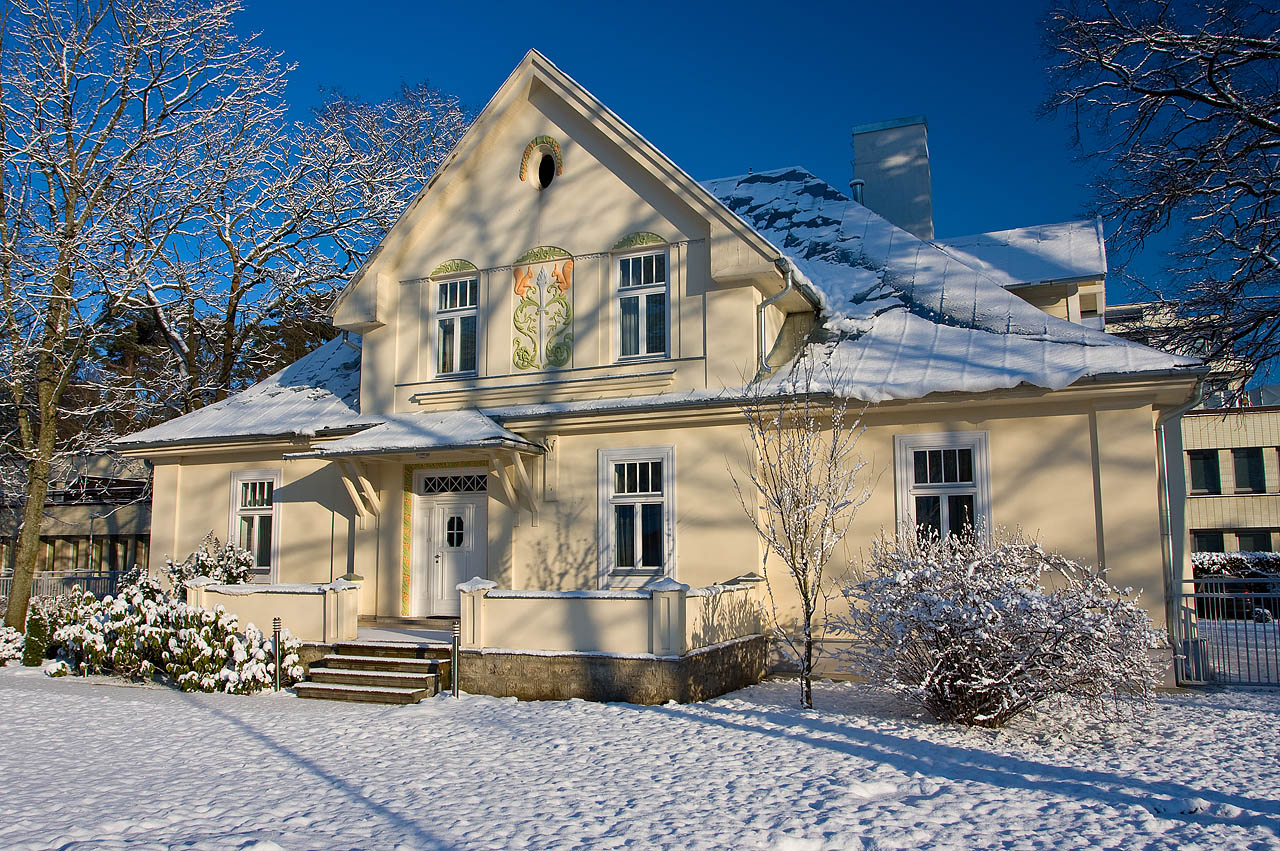
Summer House on the Jūras iela

Majori is the central district of Jūrmala resort town in Latvia famous for its spa hotels, historic Art Nouveau wooden summer houses as well as cultural activities and festivals.

Landmarks of Majori are the sandy Majori beach and pedestrian street Jomas iela dotted with crafts shops, restaurants and hotels. The old Dzintari concert hall (built in 1936) is extended to a large open-type hall with no walls merging with the surrounding dune park.

The Jūrmala City museum offers a permanent exhibition on the history of Jūrmala resorts, collections of historic swimwear, old postcards, paintings, pieces of underwater archaeology, as well as a gift shop. The Culture house of Majori is located in the historical Horna dārzs (Horn's Garden).

There are two major hotels: Jūrmala Spa and Baltic Beach hotel and several minor hotels in Majori.

The Majori railway station was established in 1877. During the era of Imperial Russia, Majori was known to western visitors as Majorenhof

== Historic buildings ==
- Majoru muiža (Majorenhof manor house, built in 1910) is located in the middle of a park near Lielupe river.
- The exhibition hall on Jomas iela 43, built in 1863, was one of the best neoclassicism buildings in Jūrmala.
- Benjamiņu nams (Benjamin's residence) on Jūras iela 13 was built in 1938 for the "Press Queen of Latvia" Emīlija Benjamiņa as the finest summer house on the beach. After World War II, it served as a guest house for the Soviet nomenclature.
