= Gonimoblast =

Type of cell produced by red algae upon the fertilization of a zygotic nucleus

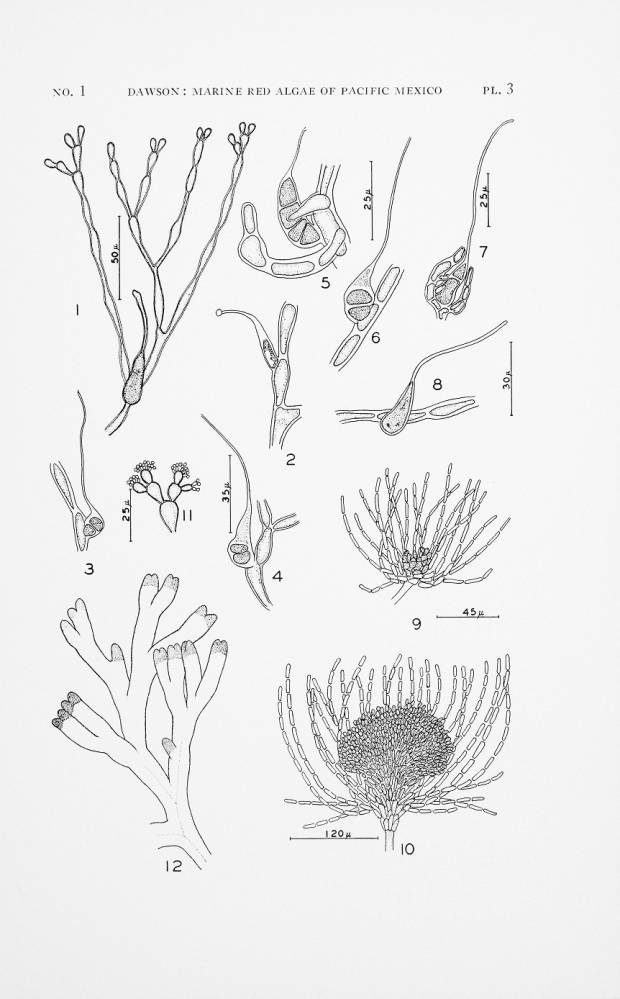
Liagora magniinvolucra Fig. 9. shows an early stage in gonimoblast development showing the already extensive development of the involucre

A gonimoblast is a type of cell produced by red algae upon the fertilization of a zygotic nucleus, and involved in the formation of carpospores. The cells subsequently divide and ultimately serve as storage or generative cells. Storage cells contain starch and are multinucleate; whereas generative cells are situated further from the auxiliary cell, are uninucleate, and form the terminal lobes in the ensuing carpospores. Gonimoblasts are connected by septal pores, usually blocked by septal plugs.
