= Dzintari =

Neighbourhood of Jūrmala, Latvia

Coordinates: 56.9735°N 23.8218°E

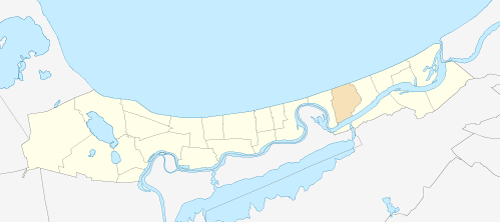
- Location in Jūrmala
- Country: Latvia
- City: Jūrmala

Area
  - Total: 3.8 km^{2} (1.5 sq mi)
- Elevation: 3 m (9.8 ft)

Population (2008)
  - Total: 2,050
  - Density: 539.5/km^{2} (1,397/sq mi)

Dzintari (until 1922, Edinburgh, Latvian: Edinburga) is a residential area and neighbourhood of the city of Jūrmala in Latvia.

== History ==
Historically, Dzintari was known as Edinburgh, in honor of the wedding of Alexander II's daughter and Alfred, the Duke of Edinburgh. In the 19th century, Dzintari became popular with Russian aristocrats. Dzintari is one of the most historical neighborhoods in Jūrmala. In 1879, a well-house was built, but it burnt down few years later. In 1878, an outdoor stage for concerts was built, later known as Edinburgh Well-house Concert Hall.

In 1922, Edinburgh was renamed Dzintari. In 1936, an indoor concert hall was built. In 2001, the Dzintari neighborhood was added to the Cultural Heritage list.

Dzintari has a Latvian-owned Resort named after it on the banks of Long Lake, Illinois.

The Dzintari railway station was established in 1877.
