= Harald Kylin =

Swedish botanist (1879–1949)

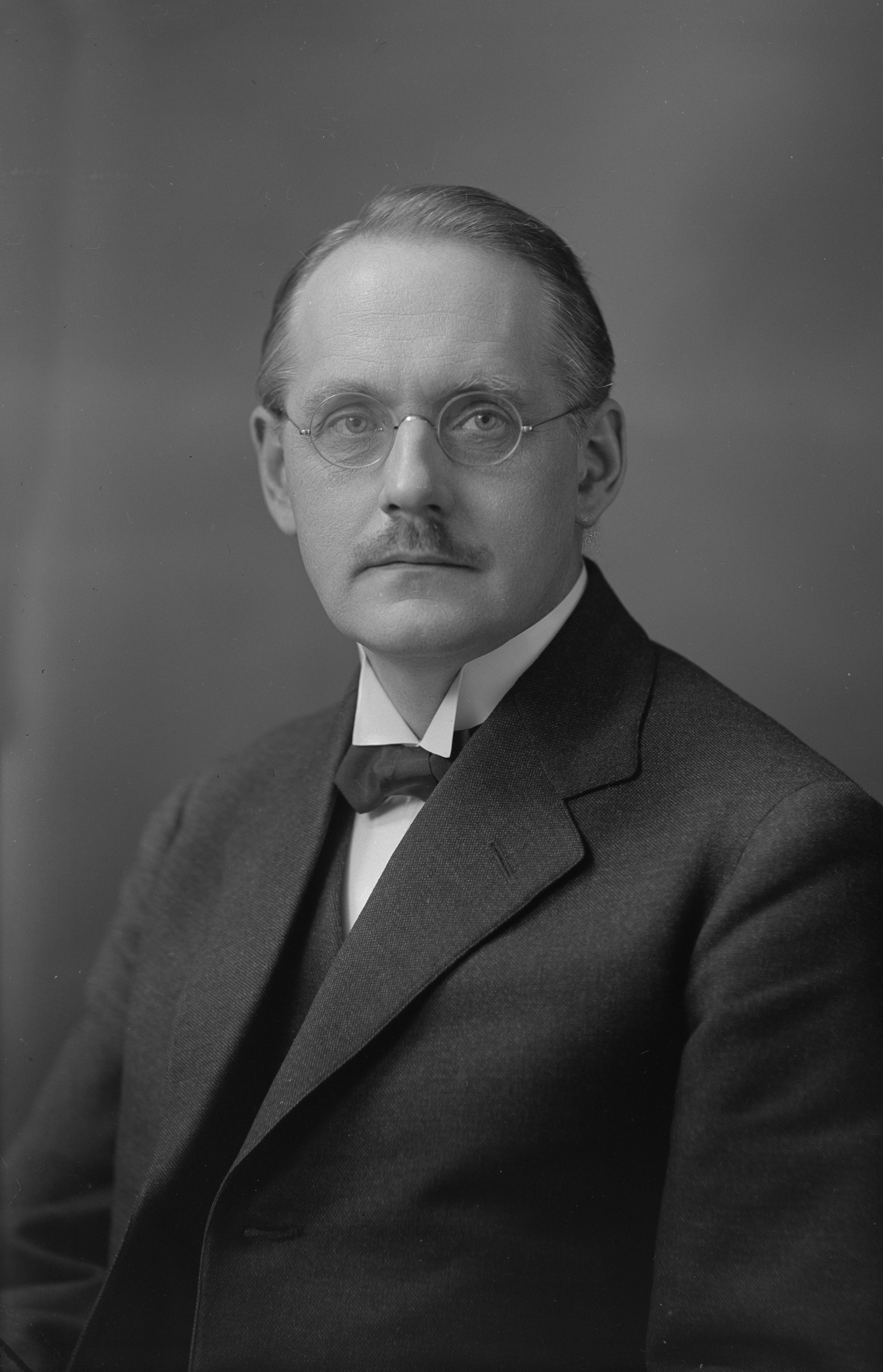
Johan Harald Kylin, 1929

Johan Harald Kylin (5 February 1879 – 16 December 1949) was a Swedish botanist specializing in phycology and a professor at Lund University. He was also editor of the Botaniska Notiser, a Swedish scientific periodical from 1922 to 1928.

== Works ==
- Die Gattungen der Rhodophyceen
