= Timothy John Entwisle =

Australian botanist

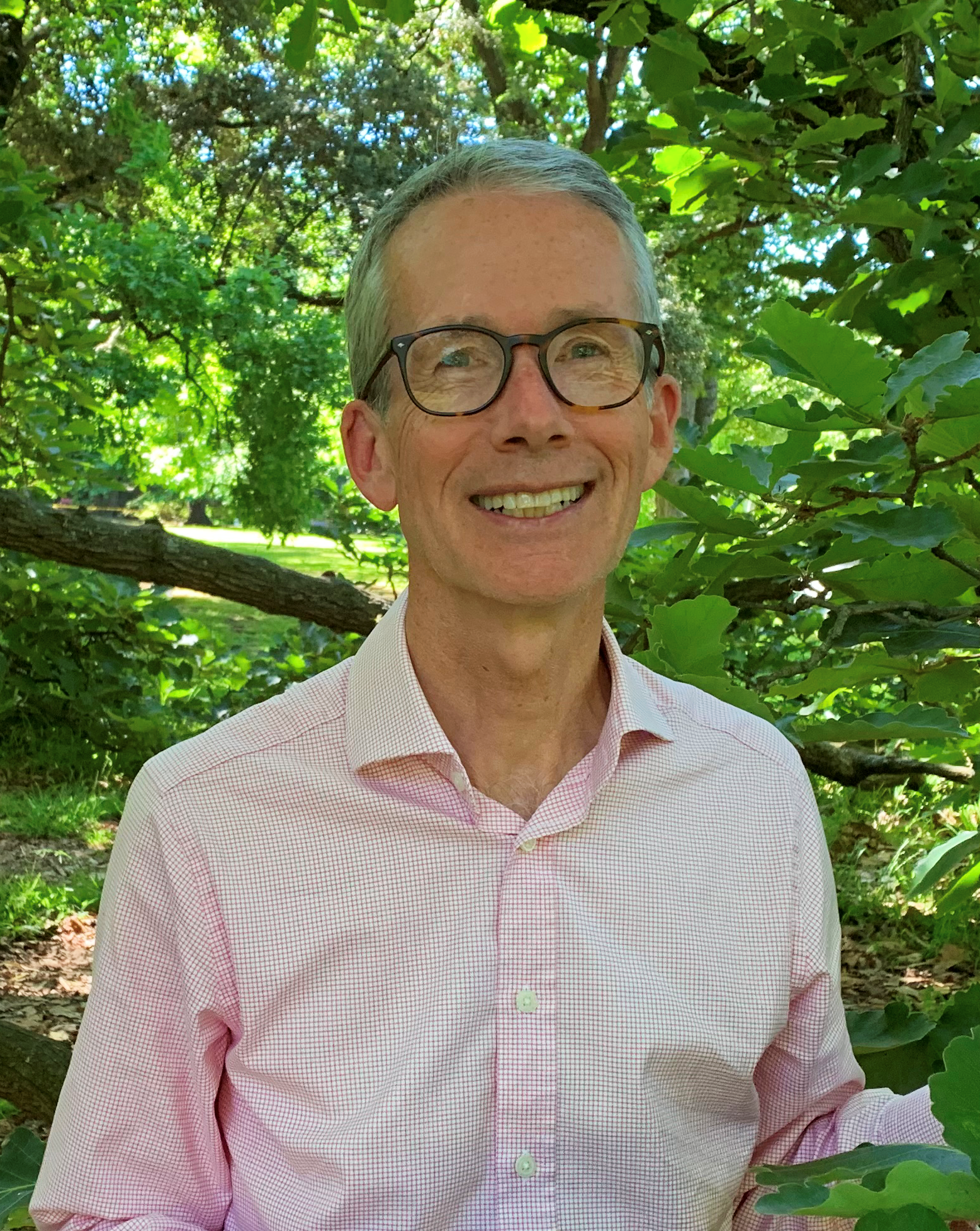
- Tim Entwisle
- Born: 17 June 1960 (age 66); Nhill
- Scientific career
- Fields: Botany; Phycology; Systematics; Taxonomy
- Institutions: Royal Botanic Garden, Sydney; Royal Botanic Gardens Victoria
- Thesis: Taxonomic studies on Vaucheria (Vaucheriaceae, Chrysophyta) in South-Eastern Australia (1986)
- Author abbrev. (botany): Entwisle

Timothy (Tim) John Entwisle AO FRSV (born 17 June 1960) is an Australian botanist, much of whose research work is in phycology (algae). See for example the articles. After completing a Bachelor of Science (majoring in Botany, with Honours) at The University of Melbourne, he was awarded a Ph.D. from La Trobe University in 1986 for work on the taxonomy of Vaucheria.

Entwisle returned to The University of Melbourne for a 3-year post-doctoral fellowship studying the ecology of filamentous algae in the Yarra River basin before being employed as a writer and editor for the Flora of Victoria project at Royal Botanic Gardens Victoria until 1998.

He was New South Wales’ Government Botanist from 2007 to 2011, and for eight years executive director of Royal Botanic Gardens Sydney (2003–2011). Subsequently, he was director of Conservation, Living Collections and Estates, Kew, London from 2011 to 2013, and from 2013 to 2023 director and chief executive of the Royal Botanic Gardens Victoria. Tim Entwisle was President of the International Association of Botanic Gardens (IABG) from 2016–2025.

Since November 2023, Entwisle has been Chair of the Sydney Harbour Federation Trust, and from November 2025, an Acting Commissioner with the Land and Environment Court of New South Wales. He continues as an honorary Professorial fellow at the University of Melbourne and in November 2025 was appointed Director Emeritus of Botanic Gardens of Sydney (where he continues algal research at their Australian Botanic Garden, Mount Annan, and in 2026 will host a science talk series on behalf of the Foundation and Friends of the Botanic Gardens, called 'Talking Plants with Tim Entwisle (Live!))

As director of the Royal Botanic Gardens Sydney, Entwisle managed Sydney's Royal Botanic Gardens, the Mount Tomah Botanic Garden, in the Blue Mountains and the Mount Annan Botanic Garden, near Camden, and at Kew, he was responsible for Kew Gardens, Wakehurst Place, and the Millennium Seed Bank. At Royal Botanic Gardens Victoria he managed Royal Botanic Gardens Melbourne and Royal Botanic Gardens Cranbourne, with a major project on taking up the Victorian appointment succession planning for the gardens under climate change.

Entwisle values communicating with the general public as well as the scientific community. He is interviewed on radio frequently and had a program, Talking Plants, on ABC radio,, which ran from December 2014 to January 2016. He is a regular contributor to the ABC radio program, Blueprint for living. He also writes blogs on plants, and articles for Gardening Australia.

In 2022, he was on the panel of expert judges for ABC's ‘Australia's Favourite Tree’ competition, where he appeared on episodes of ABC TV's show Catalyst. He also helped select the short-listed trees for a public poll which drew 265,000 responses over three weeks and contributed to ABC's live blog and various ABC radio conversations about the poll.

In the same year, Thames & Hudson published his memoir called Evergreen: The Botanical Life of a Plant Punk about his experiences as director of Royal Botanic Gardens in Sydney, Kew and Melbourne, as well as his life influences and perspectives, particularly about the role of public gardens. His love of garage music and algae feature in the early years, and there is a chapter on the very public removal of ten fig trees in Sydney during his time as director there.

Entwisle continues to publish scientific papers in phycology, and articles and books for a more general audience about plants and gardens. In 2025, CSIRO Publishing released a book of 50 essays by Entwisle, with illustrations by his son Jerome KS Entwisle, called The Sceptical Botanist: Separating Fact from Fiction.

The standard author abbreviation Entwisle is used to indicate this person as the author when citing a botanical name.

== Honours ==
Entwisle was appointed an Officer of the Order of Australia in the 2026 King's Birthday Honours in recognition of "distinguished service to environmental conservation, to botanical sciences, to the media, to tertiary education, and to the community".

In 2026, Entwisle was elected a Fellow of the Royal Society of Victoria for "distinguished leadership in botany, environmental education, and public engagement with science and biodiversity".

The algal genus, Entwisleia F.J.Scott, G.W.Saunders & Kraft, 2013, in its own family Entwisleiaceae and order Entwisleales, was named for him.

== Some published names ==
(in Algae, as T.J.Entwisle)

- Audouinella scopulata S.Skinner & T.J.Entwisle
- Batrachospermum americanum (Harvey) O.Necchi & T.J.Entwisle (currently accepted name: Tuomeya americana (Kützing) Papenfuss)
- Batrachospermum anatinum var. australe Skuja ex T.J.Entwisle
- Batrachospermum deminutum Entwisle & Foard

(Some 120 algal species listed, not all currently accepted)

== Publications ==
(incomplete)

=== Books ===
- N.G.Walsh; T.J. Entwisle, eds. (1994). "Flora Of Victoria. Vol. 2. Ferns And Allied Plants, Conifers and Monocotyledons". Melbourne: Inkata Press.
- N.G.Walsh; T.J. Entwisle, eds. (1996). "Flora of Victoria. Vol.3, Dicotyledons: Winteraceae to Myrtaceae". Melbourne: Inkata Press.
- N.G.Walsh; T.J. Entwisle, eds. (1999). "Flora of Victoria : volume 4 dicotyledons cornaceae to asteraceae". Melbourne: Inkata Press.
- Entwisle, T.J. (2014) Sprinter and Sprummer Australia's Changing Seasons CSIRO publishing ISBN 9781486302031
- Entwisle, T. (2022). Evergreen: The Botanical Life of a Plant Punk. Thames & Hudson. ISBN 9781760762254
- Entwisle, T. (2025). The Sceptical Botanist: Separating Fact from Fiction. CSIRO Publishing. ISBN 9781486318216

=== Articles ===
- Entwisle, Timothy J. (2019). "Psilosiphon scoparium gen. et sp. nov. (Lemaneaceae), a new red alga from south-eastern Australian streams". Phycologia. 28 (4): 469–475. doi:10.2216/i0031-8884-28-4-469.1. ISSN 0031-8884.
- Entwisle, T.J. 1992. The setaceous species of Batrachospermum (Rhodophyta): a re-evaluation of B. atrum (Hudson) Harvey and B. puiggarianum Grunow including the description of B. diatyches sp. nov. from Tasmania, Australia. Muelleria 7: 425–445.
- Entwisle, T.J. 1995. Batrachospermum antipodites sp. nov. (Batrachospermaceae): a widespread freshwater red alga in eastern Australia and New Zealand. Muelleria 8(3): 291–298.
- Sheath, Robert G.; Muller, Kirsten M.; Vis, Morgan L.; Entwisle, Timothy J. (1996). "A re-examination of the morphology, ultrastructure and classification of genera in the Lemaneaceae (Batrachospermales, Rhodophyta)". Phycological Research. 44 (4): 233–246. Bibcode:1996PhycR..44..233S. doi:10.1111/j.1440-1835.1996.tb00053.x. ISSN 1322-0829. S2CID 83607161.
- Entwisle, Timothy J.; Foard, Helen J. (1999). "Batrachospermum (Batrachospermales, Rhodophyta) in Australia and New Zealand: New taxa and records in sections Contorta and Hybrida". Australian Systematic Botany. 12 (4): 615. Bibcode:1999AuSyB..12..615E. doi:10.1071/SB98023. ISSN 1030-1887.
- Entwisle, T.J. & Foard, H.J. 1998. [Batrachospermum latericium sp. nov. (Batrachospermales, Rhodophyta) from Tasmania, Australia, with new observations on B. atrum and a discussion of their relationships. Muelleria 11: 27–40, 5 figs.
- Entwisle, Timothy J.; Foard, Helen J. (1997). "Batrachospermum (Batrachospermales, Rhodophyta) in Australia and New Zealand: New Taxa and Emended Circumscriptions in Sections Aristata, Batrachospermum, Turfosa and Virescentia". Australian Systematic Botany. 10 (3): 331. Bibcode:1997AuSyB..10..331E. doi:10.1071/SB96023. ISSN 1030-1887.
- Entwisle, Timothy J.; Foard, Helen J. (2019). "Freshwater Rhodophyta in Australia: Ptilothamnion richardsii (Ceramiales) and Thorea conturba sp. nov. (Batrachospermales)". Phycologia. 38 (1): 47–53. doi:10.2216/i0031-8884-38-1-47.1. ISSN 0031-8884.
- Vis, Morgan L.; Entwisle, Timothy J. (2008). "Insights into the phylogeny of the Batrachospermales (Rhodophyta) from rbcL sequence data of Australian taxa". Journal of Phycology. 36 (6): 1175–1182. doi:10.1046/j.1529-8817.2000.99224.x. ISSN 0022-3646. S2CID 84249589.
- Vis, Morgan L.; Entwisle, Timothy J.; West, John A.; Ott, Franklyn D. (2006). "Ptilothamnion richardsii(Rhodophyta) is a chantransia stage ofBatrachospermum". European Journal of Phycology. 41 (1): 125–130. Bibcode:2006EJPhy..41..125V. doi:10.1080/09670260500418504. ISSN 0967-0262. S2CID 85075100.
- Entwisle, Timothy J.; Vis, Morgan L.; Chiasson, Wayne B.; Necchi Jr., Orlando; Sherwood, Alison R. (2009). "Systematics of the Batrachospermales (Rhodophyta) - a synthesis". Journal of Phycology. 45 (3): 704–715. doi:10.1111/j.1529-8817.2009.00686.x. ISSN 0022-3646. PMID 27034046. S2CID 37719928.
- Vis, Morgan L.; Necchi, Orlando; Chiasson, Wayne B.; Entwisle, Timothy J. (2012). "Molecular Phylogeny of the Genus Kumanoa (Batrachospermales, Rhodophyta)1". Journal of Phycology. 48 (3): 750–758. doi:10.1111/j.1529-8817.2012.01141.x. ISSN 0022-3646. PMID 27011092. S2CID 39137626. pdf
- Lam, Daryl W.; Entwisle, Timothy J.; Eloranta, Pertti; Kwandrans, Janina; Vis, Morgan L. (2012). "Circumscription of species in the genusSirodotia(Batrachospermales, Rhodophyta) based on molecular and morphological data". European Journal of Phycology. 47 (1): 42–50. Bibcode:2012EJPhy..47...42L. doi:10.1080/09670262.2011.645885. ISSN 0967-0262. S2CID 85033216.
- Entwisle, Timothy J.; Johnston, Emily T.; Lam, Daryl W.; Stewart, Sarah A.; Vis, Morgan L.; De Clerck, O. (2016). "Nocturamagen. nov., Nothocladuss. lat. and other taxonomic novelties resulting from the further resolution of paraphyly in Australasian members ofBatrachospermum(Batrachospermales, Rhodophyta)". Journal of Phycology. 52 (3): 384–396. Bibcode:2016JPcgy..52..384E. doi:10.1111/jpy.12401. ISSN 0022-3646. PMID 27273531. S2CID 25810620.
