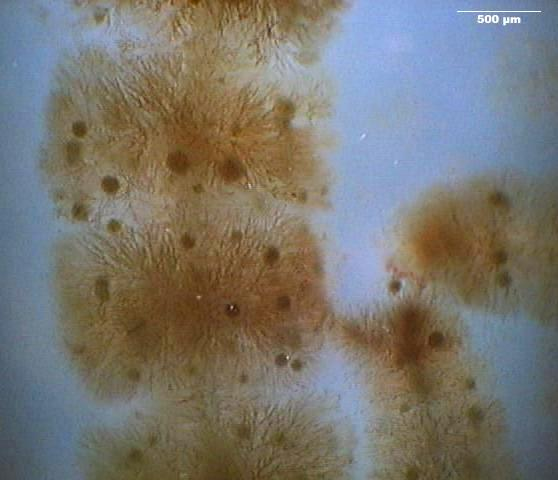
- Batrachospermum moniliforme

Scientific classification
- Clade: Archaeplastida
- Division: Rhodophyta
- Class: Florideophyceae
- Subclass: Nemaliophycidae
- Order: Batrachospermales; Pueschel & K.M.Cole

Families
- Batrachospermaceae; Lemaneaceae; Psilosiphonaceae

= Batrachospermales =

Order of algae

Batrachospermales is an order of red algae.
