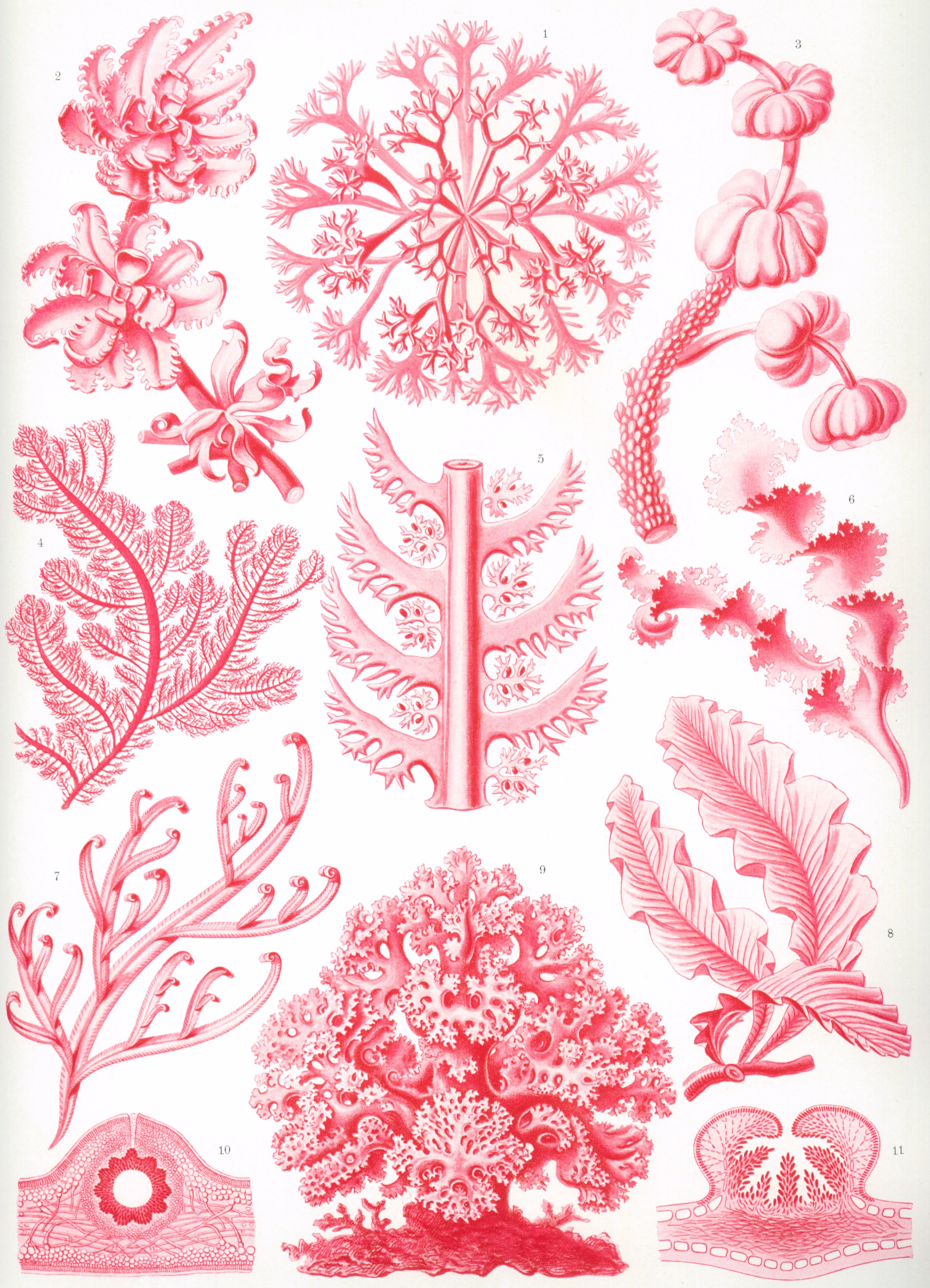
- "Florideae" from Ernst Haeckel's Kunstformen der Natur, 1904

Scientific classification
- Domain: Eukaryota
- Clade: Archaeplastida
- Division: Rhodophyta
- Subdivision: Eurhodophytina
- Class: Florideophyceae; Cronquist, 1960

Subgroups
- See text.

= Florideophyceae =

Florideophyceae Temporal range: Neoproterozoic–present

Class of algae

Florideophyceae is a class of exclusively multicellular red algae. They were once thought to be the only algae to bear pit connections, but these have since been found in the filamentous stage of the Bangiaceae. They were also thought only to exhibit apical growth, but there are genera known to grow by intercalary growth. Most, but not all, genera have three phases to the life cycle. In the subclass Nemaliophycidae there are three orders, Balbianiales, Batrachospermales, and Thoreales, which lives exclusively in freshwater. When alive, the Florideophyceae appear bright red or even violet. However, when placed in cold freshwater, their red pigment dissolves, causing the algae to turn green.

== Classification ==
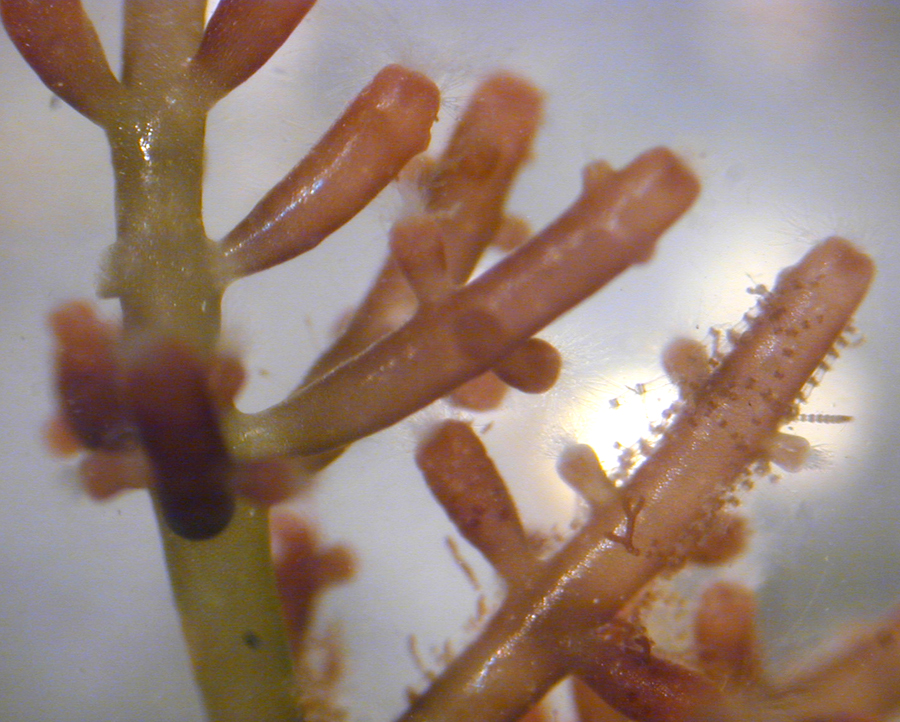
A Laurencia red alga from Hawaii

There are various classification schemes; see red algae. One option is to use the following:

=== Subclass Hildenbrandiophycidae ===
- Hildenbrandiales

=== Subclass Nemaliophycidae ===
- Acrochaetiales
- Balbianiales
- Balliales
- Batrachospermales
- Colaconematales
- Nemaliales
- Palmariales
- Entwisleiales
- Thoreales

=== Subclass Corallinophycidae ===
- Corallinales
- Corallinapetrales
- Rhodogorgonales
- Sporolithales

The subclass Corallinophycidae was introduced in 2007.

=== Subclass Ahnfeltiophycidae ===
- Ahnfeltiales
- Pihiellales

=== Subclass Rhodymeniophycidae ===
- Bonnemaisoniales
- Ceramiales
- Gelidiales
- Gigartinales
- Gracilariales
- Halymeniales
- Nemastomatales
- Peyssonneliales
- Plocamiales
- Rhodymeniales
- Acrosymphytales
- Atractophorales
- Catenellopsidales
- Sebdeniales

According to molecular clock analysis, Florideophyceae diverged from other red algae about 943 (817–1,049) million years ago. It split into Hildenbrandiophycidae ca. 781 (681–879) mya, Nemaliophycidae ca. 661 (597–736) mya and Corallinophycidae ca. 579 (543–617) mya, and ca. 508 (442–580) mya the split between Ahnfeltiophycidae and Rhodymeniophycidae occurred.
