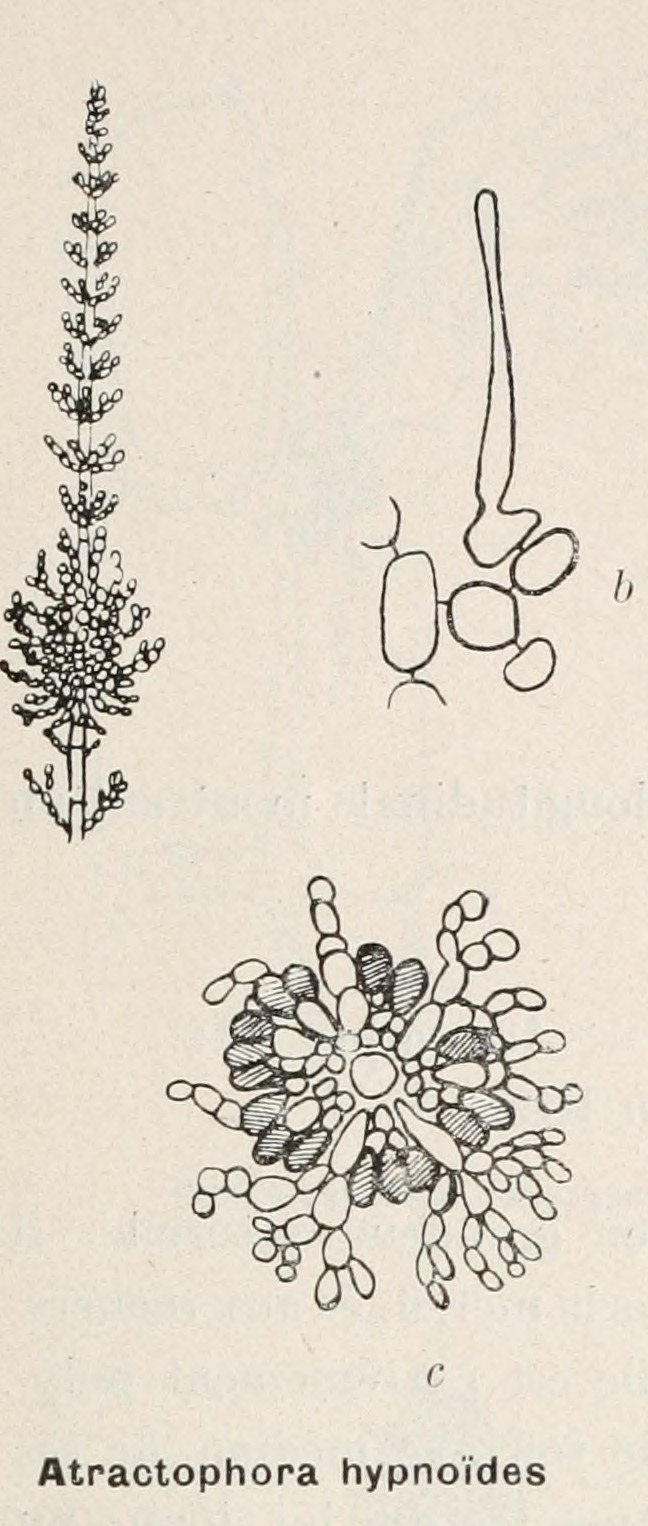

Scientific classification
- Domain: Eukaryota
- Clade: Archaeplastida
- Division: Rhodophyta
- Class: Florideophyceae
- Genus: Atractophora
- Species: A. hypnoides

Binomial name
- Atractophora hypnoides P.L.Crouan & H.M.Crouan

Synonyms
- Naccaria hypnoides (P.L.Crouan & H.M.Crouan) J.Agardh, 1863; Rhododiscus pulcherrimus P.L.Crouan & H.M.Crouan, 1859

= Atractophora hypnoides =

Species of alga

Atractophora hypnoides is a rare red alga (Rhodophyta) found in the British Isles, France and some Atlantic Islands and is the only species of the genus found in the British Isles. It is attached to the rock (as crustose) or other algae by a small basal disc and is much branched with downgrowing filaments which enclose the main branch or axis forming a cortex. Short filaments of limited growth radiate in whorls from the axis and frequently convert into hairs. The spreading filaments grow irregularly in a diffuse manner. Microscope examination is required for identification.

== Botanical description ==
Atractophora hypnoides is the gametangial, that is the sexual reproductive, phase of this alga, tetransporangia are unknown. The gametangial thallus is erect, red and grows to a length of about 10 cm. In the life cycle the adult, gametangial phase of the plant, produces spermatangia in clusters and carposporophytes which produce carpospores. On release these germinate and develop into the gametangial phase. No tetrasporangial phase is known. (Dixon and Irvine 1977 p. 148) However tetraspores released from Rhododiscus pulcherrimus when cultured germinated to form spermitangial and carpogonial branches. The vegetative and reproductive development corresponded closely with that described for Atractophora hypnoides. There are many other similar finely branched algae: Audouinella, Antithamnion, Dasya, Spyridia and others.

== Distribution ==
It is mainly a western species in the British Isles with records from the Inner Hebrides of Scotland, Galway and County Cork in the south of Ireland, a few records from Wales and south-western England. There are only four records from Northern Ireland: County Antrim from Rathlin Island and Loughan Bay and in County Down at Greenore Point and near the entrance of Strangford Lough and five from the Republic of Ireland. It is recorded from several sites in England (counties: Cornwall, Devon and Dorset) and Wales but most often in the western islands of Scotland. It is also recorded from the Channel Islands and the Isle of Man. In Europe it is known from the coasts of France.

== Life cycle ==
The vegetative and reproductive development phase of Atractophora hypnoides as crustose, was known formerly as Rhododiscus pulcherrimus.

== Habitat ==
The species grows epiphytically on coralline algae and is to be found only in the sublittoral to 20m depth.
