= Bulboplastis =

Scientific classification
- Clade: Archaeplastida
- Division: Rhodophyta
- Class: Rhodellophyceae
- Order: Dixoniellales
- Family: Dixoniellaceae
- Genus: Bulboplastis; A.Kushibiki, A.Yokoyama, M.Iwataki, J.Yokoyama, J.A.West & Y.Hara
- Species: B. apyrenoidosa

Binomial name
- Bulboplastis apyrenoidosa A.Kushibiki, A.Yokoyama, M.Iwataki, J.Yokoyama, J.A.West & Y.Hara

Genus of algae

Bulboplastis is a unicellelar red alga belonging to Rhodellophyceae (Rhodophyta). The only species in the genus is Bulboplastis apyrenoidosa. First described in 2012 in Japanese mangrove forests, this genus is characterized by its unique lobed chloroplast that lacks a pyrenoid, differentiating it from other unicellular red algae. It has drawn interest for its evolutionary significance, particularly in studies of plastid genome reduction and group II intron mobility.

== Type species ==
The type species for Bulboplastis is Bulboplastis apyrenoidosa.

== History of knowledge ==
The original isolation of Bulboplastis apyrenoidosa took place in 1984, from a sediment sample obtained on Iriomote Island, Japan. However, due to its morphological resemblance to Rhodospora sordida, it was treated as Rhodospora. Various papers continued to cite this species as Rhodospora and place it in the same clade as Dixoniella and Rhodella in phylogenetic trees. Due to advancements in microscopy and molecular techniques, the species was described further in 2012 and characterized by its distinct chloroplast. B. apyrenoidosa forms a clade with three genera of the Dixoniellales: Dixoniella, Glaucosphaera, and Neorhodella. Its compact plastid genome has allowed further genomic studies to contribute to broader research on red algal genome evolution.

== Habitat and ecology ==
Bulboplastis apyrenoidosa is found in mangrove-associated environments, where it thrives under varying salinity conditions. It plays a role in primary production within its ecosystem, potentially contributing to nutrient cycles through its metabolic adaptations, including mannitol production.

== Description of the organism ==
=== Morphology and anatomy ===
They are free-living, spherical unicellular algae ranging from 6.5 to 23.0 μm in diameter, with a mean size of 11.2 μm. Bulboplastis lacks a rigid cell wall but is surrounded by a thick mucilaginous sheath of variable thickness (1.5 - 7.8 μm), which changes depending on culture conditions and cell age. The mucilaginous sheath has two fibrous layers, a thin inner layer and a thicker, less dense outer layer. The single, grayish-green chloroplast is highly lobed, encircles the centrally located nucleus, and lacks a pyrenoid. Peripheral thylakoids are absent, but plastoglobuli clusters are present near the chloroplast envelope. The location of the nucleus is central within the cell, with one or two prominent nucleoli. The Golgi bodies are found in the perinuclear region, and nucleus-associated organelles (NAOs) are present as ring-shaped structures associated with electron-dense material. The mitochondrial profiles are distributed around the periphery and near the nuclear region. Golgi bodies show electron-dense spaces between their cisternae, and the peripheral endoplasmic reticulum is located just beneath the cell membrane.

=== Life cycle ===
Bulboplastis undergoes asexual reproduction through binary fission.

=== Genetics ===
Bulboplastis apyrenoidosa shows significant genome compaction, which aligns with the trend observed in red algae. Mobile group II introns have been found in its plastid genome, helping in our understanding of horizontal gene transfer and genome evolution. Additionally, its mitochondrial genome contains repeat-rich sequences, which further support the hypothesis of dynamic mitochondrial genome evolution in red algae.

== Practical importance ==
The genome of Bulboplastis has been studied as a model for understanding plastid genome reduction and evolution in red algae. Its unique genetic features may offer insights into bioengineering and evolutionary biology.
