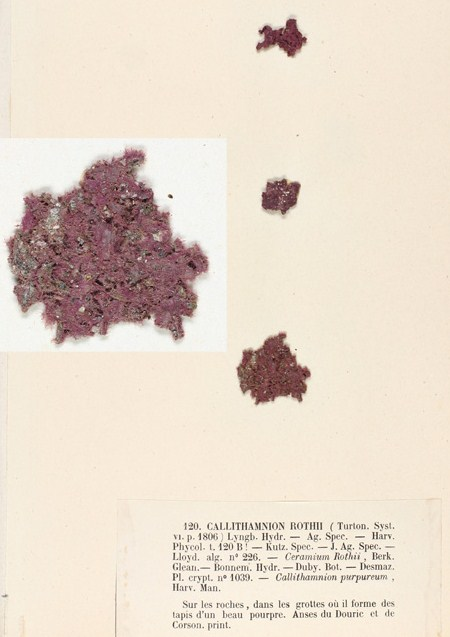
- Rhodochorton purpureum

Scientific classification
- Domain: Eukaryota
- Clade: Archaeplastida
- Division: Rhodophyta
- Class: Florideophyceae
- Order: Acrochaetiales
- Family: Acrochaetiaceae
- Genus: Rhodochorton; Nägeli

Species
- Rhodochorton entozoicum (Reinsch) De Toni; Rhodochorton kurilense Nagai; Rhodochorton lepadicola (Welwitsch) De Toni; Rhodochorton mesocarpum; Rhodochorton parkeri Gibson; Rhodochorton subsimplex (Harvey ex Agardh) De Toni

= Rhodochorton =

Genus of algae

Rhodochorton is a genus of filamentous red alga adapted to low light levels. It may form tufts or a thin purple "turf" up to 5 millimetres high. The filaments branch infrequently, usually at the tips.

== Morphology ==
In most species of Rhodochorton, the spore does not persist in the mature plant; instead, a basal web of filaments acts as a holdfast. Indeed, all Rhodochorton species have distinct basal threads, usually forming a disc, and upright threads, which are typically thinner. Lateral branches usually occur at or near the top of the patent cell, and branching is concentrated towards the tips of threads.

== Ecology ==
The organism may encrust bare rock surfaces, or be epiphytic upon frondose algae - particularly Laminaria hyperborea. It typically grows in the shadow of these larger algae, in the intertidal zone, and its adaption to low light levels means it is also common in caves. It reproduces in winter using tetrasporangia and don't bear any monosporangia. Rhodochorton is typically marine, but R. investiens dwells in fresh water. Sexual reproduction has never been observed.

It suffers grazing pressure from gastropods and amphipods, but amazingly fragments of the algae are able to pass through the grazers' digestive tracts alive - grazing may actually form a mode of dispersal for the organism.

== Life history ==
Rhodochorton investiens displays a relatively simple life cycle for a red alga.

In the Carposporophyte: a spermatium merges with a trichogyne (a long hair on the female sexual organ), which then divides to form carposporangia - which produce carpospores.

Carpospores germinate into gametophytes, which produce sporophytes. Both of these are very similar; they produce monospores from monosporangia "just below a cross wall in a filament" and their spores are "liberated through apex of sporangial cell."

The spores of a sporophyte produce tetrasporophytes. Monospores produced by this phase germinate immediately, with no resting phase, to form an identical copy of parent. Tetrasporophytes may also produce a carpospore, which germinates to form another tetrasporophyte.

The gametophyte may replicate using monospores, but produces sperm in spermatangia, and "eggs"(?) in carpogonium.

== See also ==
- Rhodothamniella, a genus that closely resembles Rhodochorton
