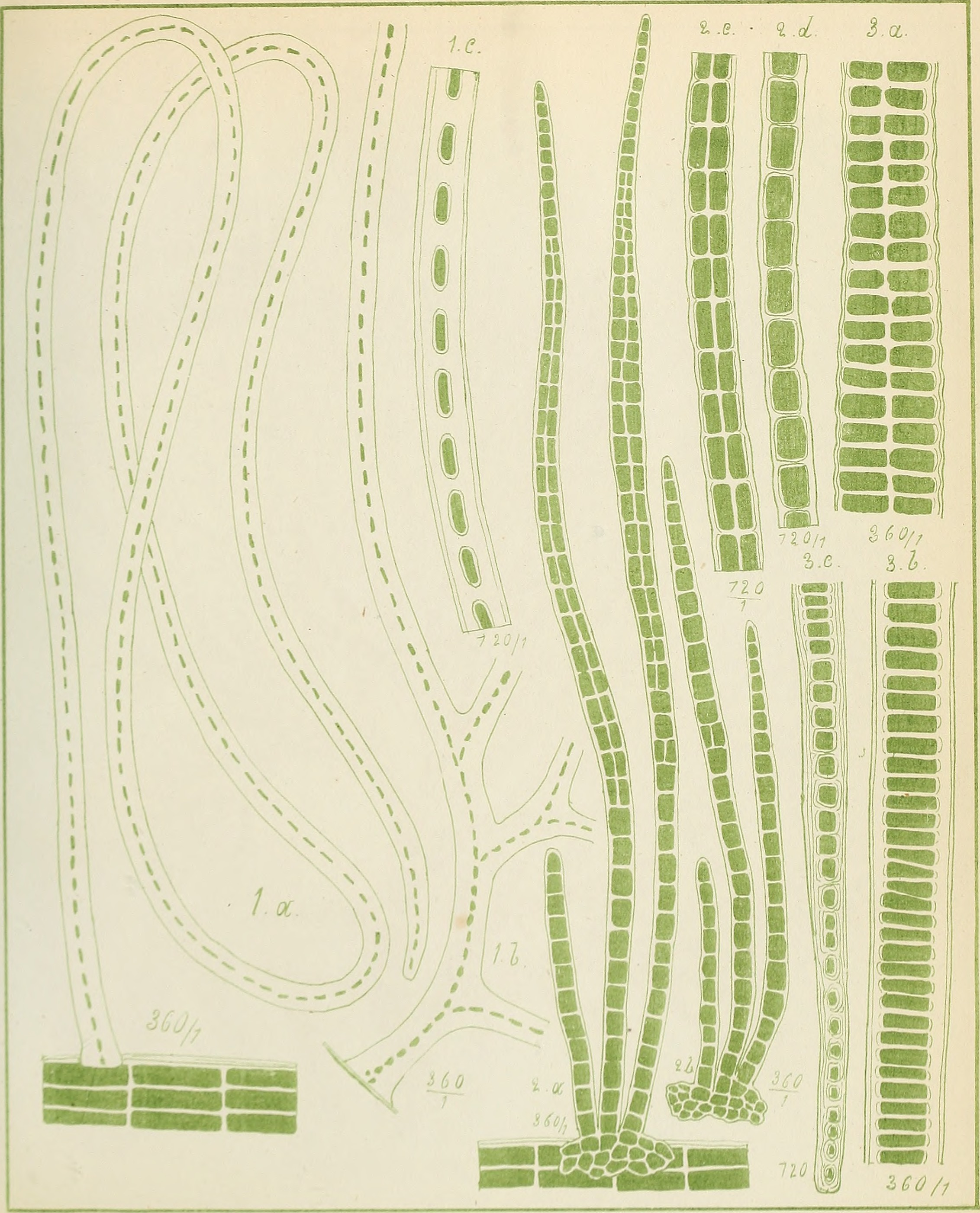
- 1) Chroodactylon sp. (formerly Callonema), 2) Erythrotrichia investiens (formerly Bangia caespitosa), 3) Bangia fuscopurpurea (formerly Bangia lutea)

Scientific classification
- Domain: Eukaryota
- Clade: Archaeplastida
- Division: Rhodophyta
- Class: Stylonematophyceae
- Order: Stylonematales
- Family: Stylonemataceae
- Genus: Chroodactylon; Hansgirg, 1885

= Chroodactylon =

Genus of algae

Chroodactylon is a genus of red algae belonging to the family Stylonemataceae.

Species:

- Chroodactylon depressum (G.Martens) Krishnamurthy, Balakrishnan & Desikachary
- Chroodactylon filamentosum (Kant & Gupta) E.K.Ganesan, J.A.West & Necchi
- Chroodactylon ornatum (C.Agardh) Basson
- Chroodactylon ramosum (Thwaites) Hansgirg
- Chroodactylon wolleanum Hansgirg
