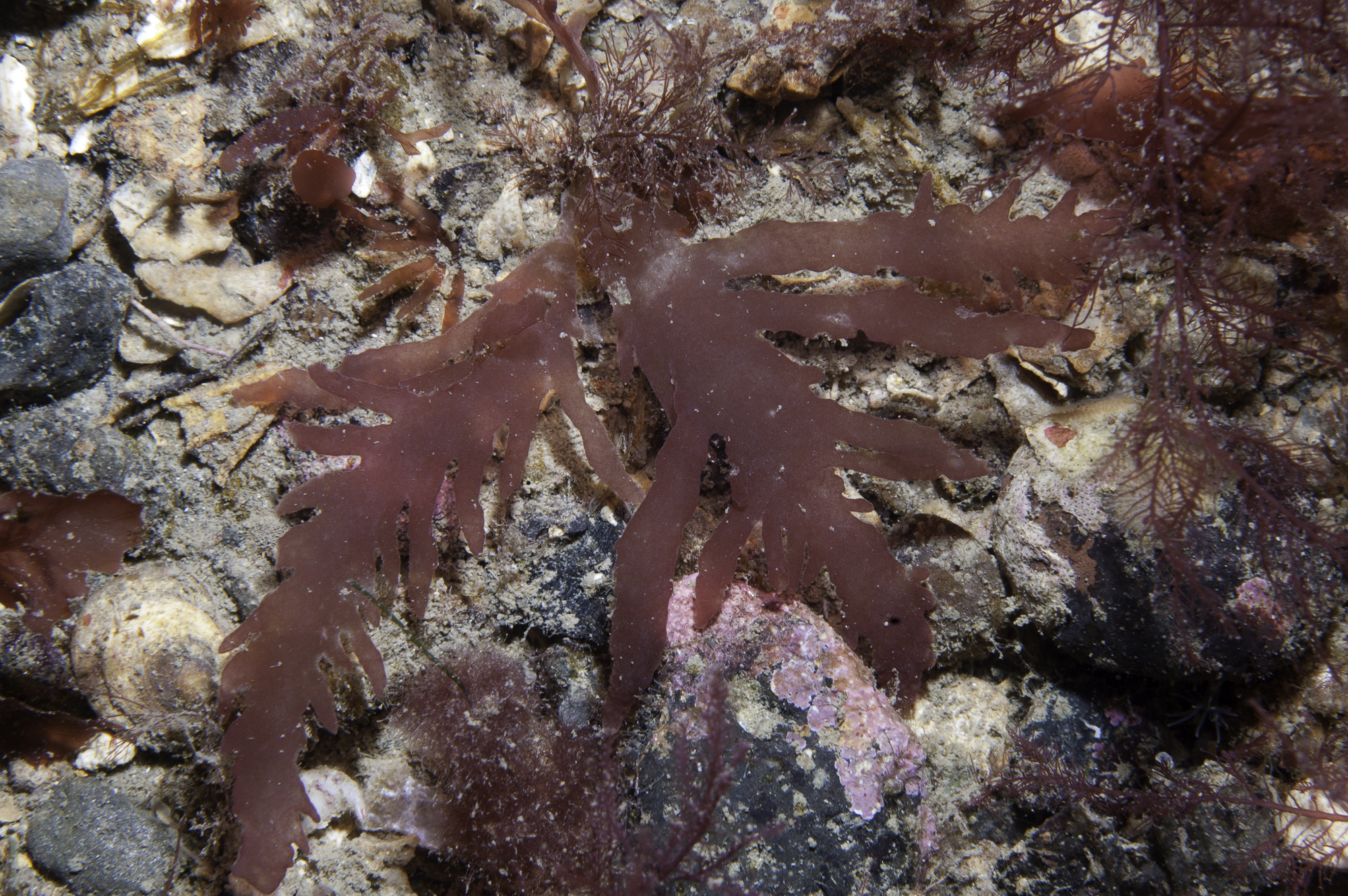

Scientific classification
- Domain: Eukaryota
- Clade: Archaeplastida
- Division: Rhodophyta
- Class: Florideophyceae
- Order: Gigartinales
- Family: Calosiphoniaceae
- Genus: Schmitzia
- Species: S. hiscockiana

Binomial name
- Schmitzia hiscockiana Maggs & Guiry 1985

= Schmitzia hiscockiana =

Species of alga

Schmitzia hiscockiana is a small, rare, red seaweed or marine alga of the phylum Rhodophyta or red algae. It was discovered and named in 1985.

== Distribution ==
This small red marine alga is known from most coasts of Ireland, Wales, England, and Scandinavia.

== Habitat ==
This species is known only from the sublittoral zone to 15m depth; it grows on cobbles and pebbles.

The gametophyte plants exist between April and August, and are in the crustose phase from September to December.

== Species description ==
The gametophyte phase is a soft and gelatinous plant, no more than 8 cm long, 6 cm wide and a few millimeters thick. It is flattened and divided in a leaf-like manner with marginal proliferations. Rose pink in colour, the blades are composed of a filamentous axis bearing whorls of branchlets, four or five per axial cell. These whorls of branchlets form a cortex.

== Life history ==
The plants are monoecious, bearing spermatia and carpogonia. After fertilization and development of connecting filaments and fusion with intercalary vegetative cells, a carposporphyte develops. The tetrasporophyte phase is crustose and unknown in the wild. It is bright red and grows to 6 mm in diameter and composed of a single basal layer of cells which produce erect filaments some of which produce tetraspores. These tetraspores develop and grow to give rise to the gametophyte generations.

== Similar species ==
Other species of Schmitzia are distinct. S. neapolitana from the North Atlantic and Mediterranean is always terete. S. hiscockiana is easily recognizable: it more closely resembles S. evanescens (New Zealand) and S. japonica (Japan and Australia).
