= Porphyridium sordidum =

Scientific classification
- Domain: Eukaryota
- Clade: Archaeplastida
- Division: Rhodophyta
- Class: Porphyridiophyceae
- Order: Porphyridiales
- Family: Porphyridiaceae
- Genus: Porphyridium
- Species: P. sordidum

Binomial name
- Porphyridium sordidum Geitler 1932

Species of red algae

Porphyridium sordidum is a freshwater species of red algae in the family Porphyridiophyceae. Despite being a red algae species, it is olive-green in color.
