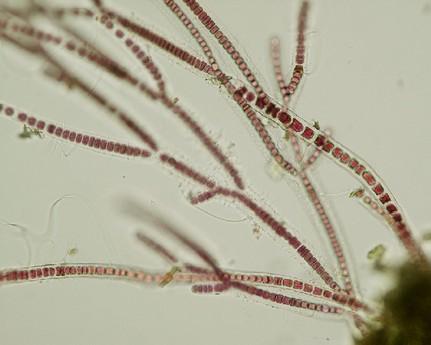

Scientific classification
- Clade: Archaeplastida
- Division: Rhodophyta
- Class: Stylonematophyceae
- Order: Stylonematales
- Family: Stylonemataceae
- Genus: Stylonema; Reinsch 1875

Species
- Stylonema alsidii; Stylonema cornu-cervi (type); Stylonema subcoeruleum

= Stylonema =

Genus of algae

Stylonema is a genus of red algae, common in Australian waters. It is distinguishable from other species of red algae by the width of the filaments of its thallus, being only one cell across.

It includes the species Stylonema alsidii.
