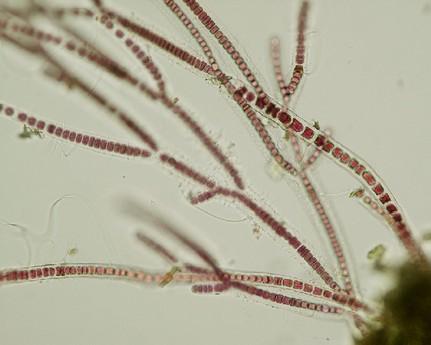
- Stylonema alsidii

Scientific classification
- Clade: Archaeplastida
- Division: Rhodophyta
- Class: Stylonematophyceae
- Order: Stylonematales
- Family: Stylonemataceae
- Genus: Stylonema
- Species: S. alsidii

Binomial name
- Stylonema alsidii (Zanardini) K.M.Drew (1956)

Synonyms
- Bangia alsidii Zanardini 1840; Bangia elegans Chauvin 1842; Callonema elegans (Chauvin) Reinsch 1875; Goniotrichum elegans var. alsidii (Zanardini) Zanardini 1873; Goniotrichum alsidii (Zanardini) M.Howe 1914; Stylonema elegans

= Stylonema alsidii =

Species of alga

Stylonema alsidii is a species of marine red algae. The type locality is Trieste, Italy, but it has a worldwide distribution.

The species was first described by Giovanni Zanardini in 1840 as Bangia alsidii.

== Distribution ==
It is one of the algae of the Houtman Abrolhos, found off the coast of Western Australia. It is one of the red seaweeds of South Africa, including the seaweeds of the Cape Peninsula and False Bay.

== Ecology ==
It is susceptible to infection by the parasitic oomycete Pythium porphyrae.
