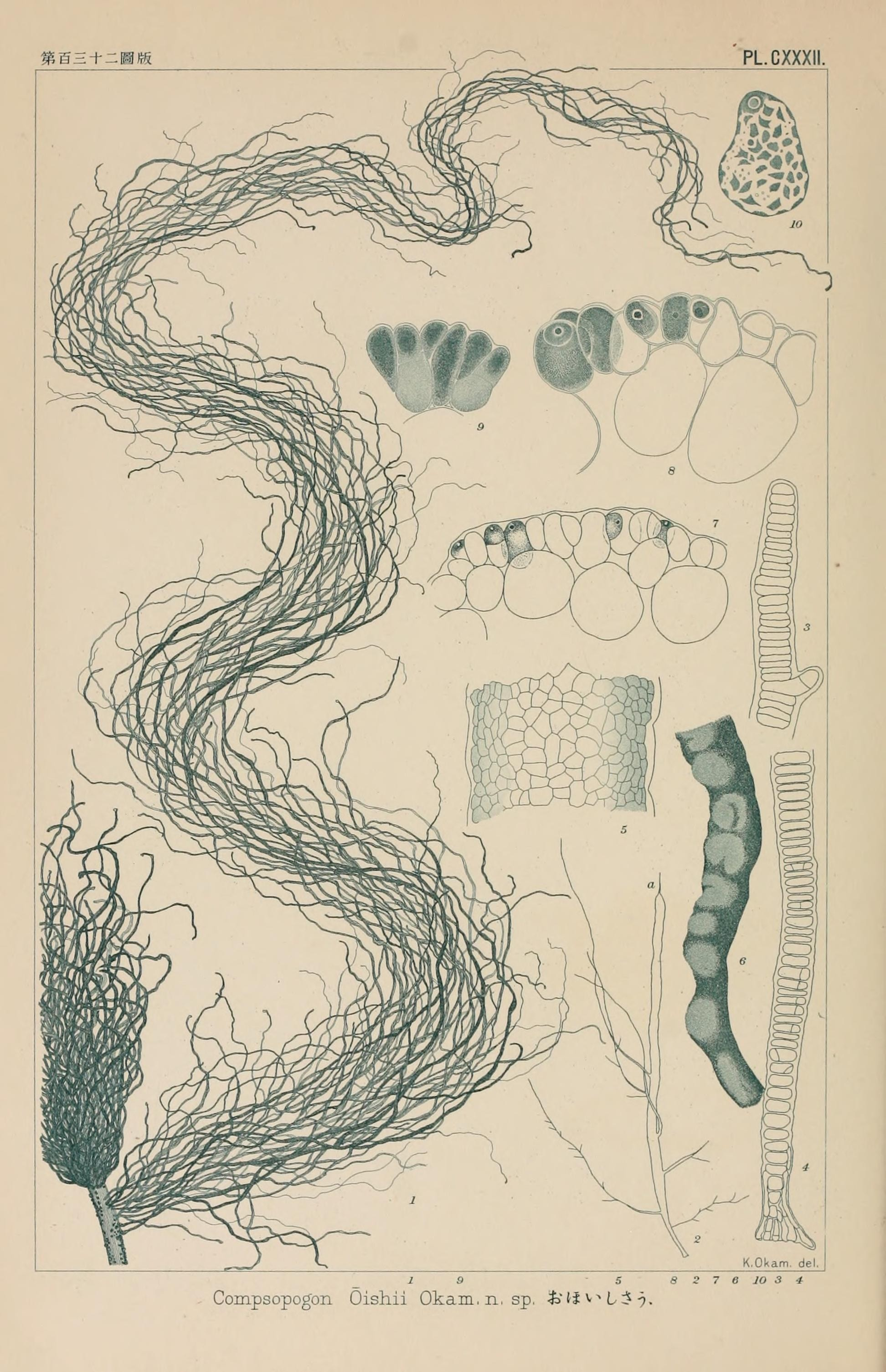
- Compsopogon sp.

Scientific classification
- (unranked): Archaeplastida
- Division: Rhodophyta
- Class: Compsopogonophyceae
- Order: Compsopogonales
- Family: Compsopogonaceae
- Genus: Compsopogon
- Species: C. caeruleus

Binomial name
- Compsopogon caeruleus (Balbis ex C.Agardh) Montagne

= Compsopogon =

Genus of algae

Compsopogon caeruleus, known as staghorn algae, is a species of red algae that lives in fresh water. It is a common nuisance in freshwater aquaria. It is the only species in the genus Compsopogon and the only representative of the family Compsopogonaceae. It is found in North America, South America, Europe, Africa, Asia, Australasia and Oceania. Compsopogon can tolerate a wide range of conditions in freshwater streams and occasionally in brackish lagoons and estuaries. It propagates by asexual spores.

Compsopogon presents a thallus of simple cylindrical cells inside large covered cortical cells. In more mature and large thallus interior cells can be disintegrated, leaving only the outer cortex.

The species exhibits a wide phenotypic plasticity in studies such as field observations, with the result that historically many species have been described, when current thought treats it as a single species. There are two main morphologies in Compsopogon, one displaying regular cortical cells (morphology caeruleus), the other having cells with extra rhizoidals (morphology leptoclados).
