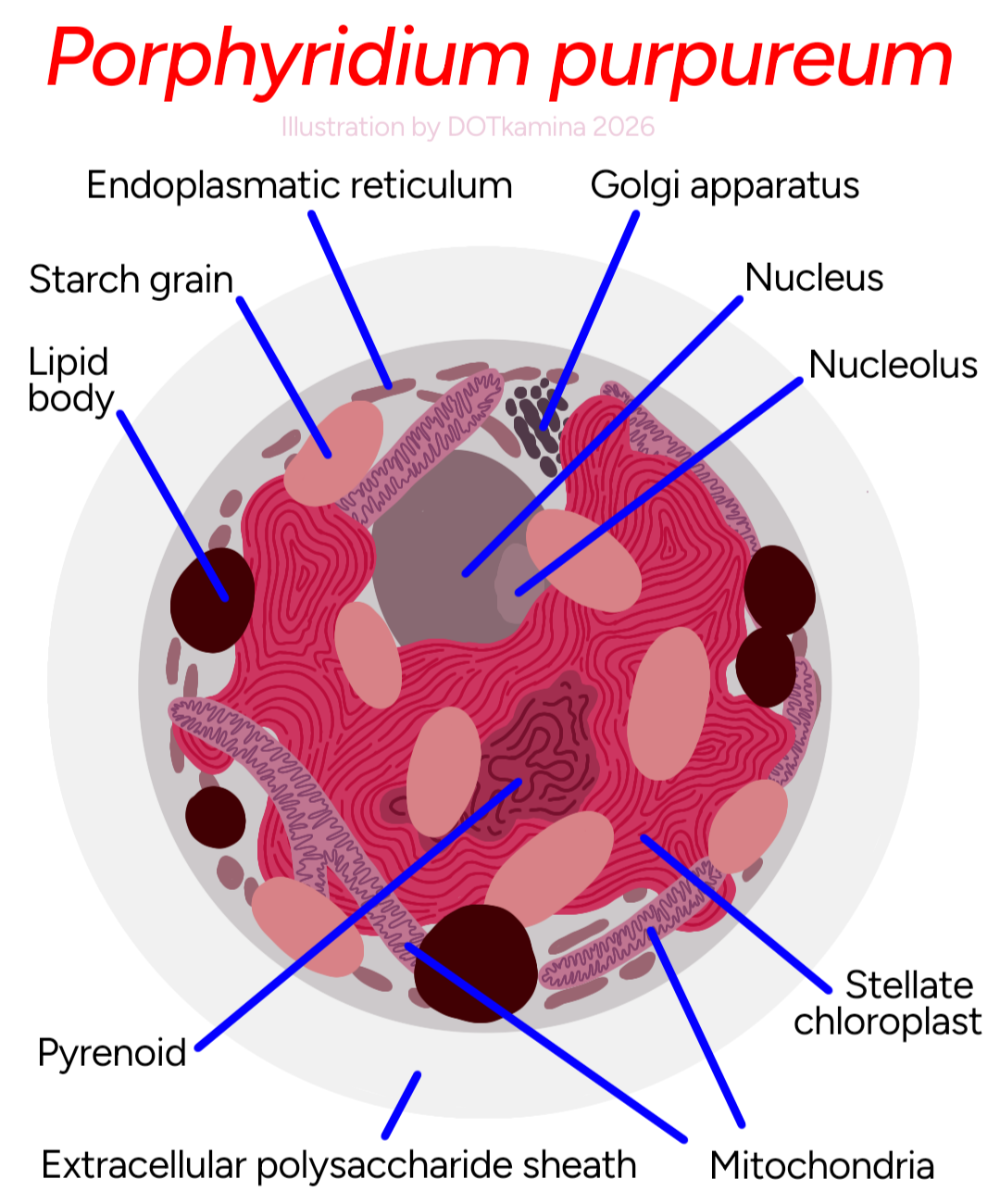

Scientific classification
- Domain: Eukaryota
- Supergroup: Archaeplastida
- Division: Rhodophyta
- Class: Porphyridiophyceae
- Order: Porphyridiales
- Family: Porphyridiaceae
- Genus: Porphyridium
- Species: P. purpureum

Binomial name
- Porphyridium purpureum (Bory) K.M.Drew & R.Ross. 1965

Synonyms
- Phytoconis purpurea Bory 1797; Merrettia purpurea (Bory) Trevisan 1848; Rhodella purpureum (Bory) B.F.Zheng & J.Li 2009; Heterotypic: "Tremella cruenta" Smith 1807; Olivia cruenta (Smith) S. F. Gray 1821; Porphyridium cruentum (S.F.Gray) Nägeli 1849; Chaos sanguinarius Bory ex Desmazières 1823; Sarcoderma sanguineum Ehrenberg 1930; Porphyridium marinum Kylin 1937

= Porphyridium purpureum =

Species of red algae

Porphyridium purpureum is a species of red algae in the family Porphyridiophyceae. Porphyridium cruentum is considered a heterotypic synonym of P. purpureum by AlgaeBase following Drew. It's genome was sequenced in 2013 and has 8,355 predicted genes.

The microalga Porphyridium purpureum is a unicellular eukaryotic marine red algal (Rhodophyta) that lacks a cell wall but procudes extracellular polysaccharides (EPS) that surround the cell. This EPS however makes it more prone to bacterial contamination when cultivated given the EPS is a food source for other micro-organisms. It is one of the few species of microalgae already cultivated at commercial scale.

P. purpureum is a potential source for several products like fatty acids, lipids, polysaccharides and pigments. The polysaccharides of this species are sulfated and their structure gives rise to some unique properties that could lead to a broad range of industrial and pharmaceutical applications. Additionally, P. purpureum biomass containing up to 57% carbohydrate have been reported. The carbohydrates in biomass and exopolysaccharides of this microalga could potentially provide feedstock for bio-fuel and pharmaceuticals. This alga contains phycoerythrin that can be extracted by lyse and chromatography.

Porphyridium purpureum is used as a model species for Rhodophyta. Remarkably, bacterial plasmids can replicate in its cell nucleus unchanged: the bacterial origin of replication "just works". This could explain the extensive presence of bacterial genes acquired through horizontal gene transfer in Rhodophyta.
