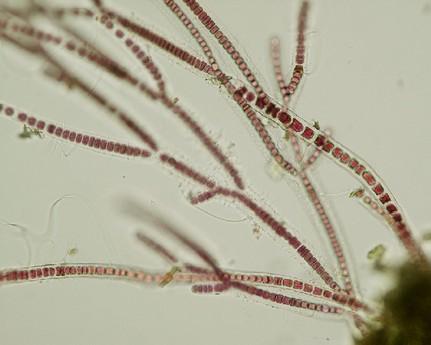
- Stylonema alsidii

Scientific classification
- Domain: Eukaryota
- Clade: Archaeplastida
- Division: Rhodophyta
- Class: Stylonematophyceae
- Order: Stylonematales; K.M.Drew
- Family: Stylonemataceae; K.M.Drew

Genera
- See text

= Stylonemataceae =

Family of algae

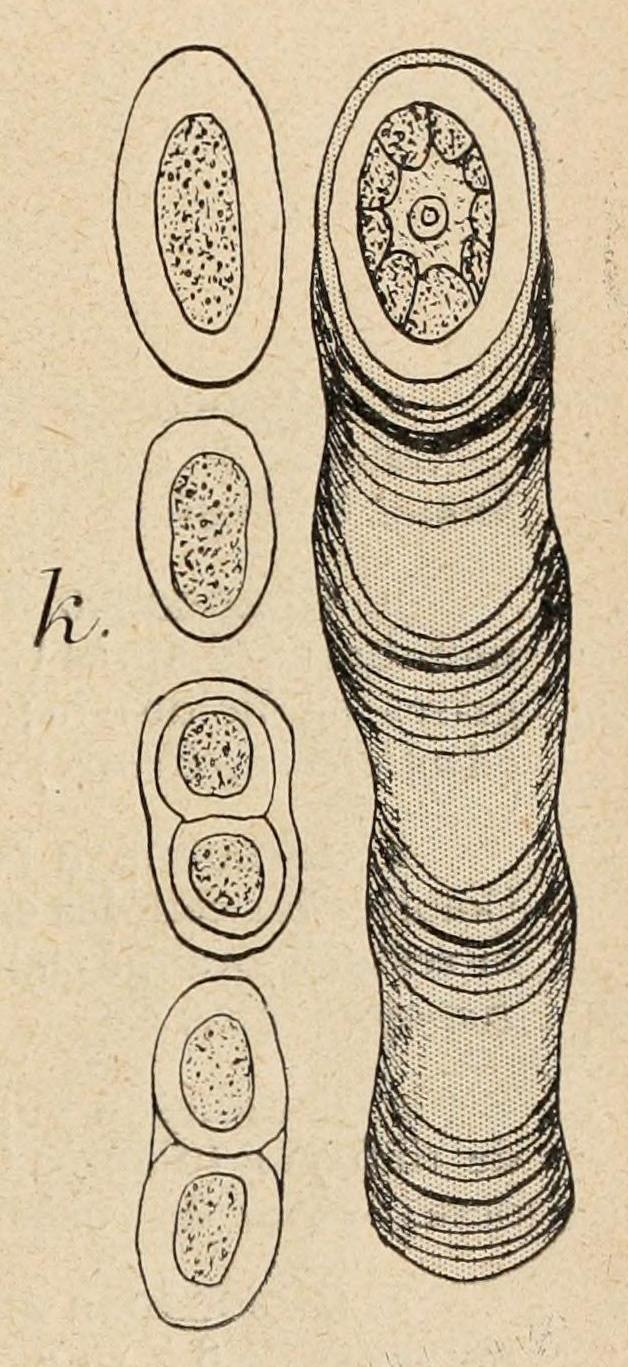
Illustration of Chroothece richteriana Hansg.

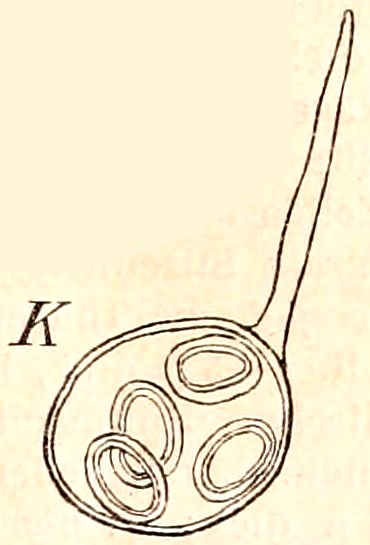
Illustration of Zachariasia endophytica Lemm., syn. Chroothece endophytica

Stylonemataceae is a family of red algae in the class Stylonematophyceae. It is the only family in the monotypic order Stylonematales.

== Genera and number of species ==
1. Bangiopsis F.Schmitz 3
2. Chroodactylon Hansgirg 3
3. Chroothece Hansgirg 9
4. Colacodictyon Feldmann 1
5. Empselium G.I.Hansen & Scagel 1
6. Goniotrichiopsis G.M.Smith 2
7. Kyliniella Skuja 1
8. Neevea Batters 1
9. Purpureofilum J.A.West, Zuccarello & J.L.Scott 1
10. Rhodaphanes J.A.West, G.C.Zuccarello, J.L Scott & K.A.West 1
11. Rhodosorus Geitler 2
12. Rhodospora Geitler 1
13. Stylonema Reinsch 19
14. Tsunamia J.A.West, G.I.Hansen, Zuccarello & T.Hanyuda 1
15. Viator G.I.Hansen, J.A.West, & G.C.Zuccarello 1

Zachariasia Lemmermann, 1895 (with holotype Zachariasia endophytica Lemmermann) is currently regarded as a synonym of Chroothece. This should not be confused with Zachariasia Voigt 1901 non Lemmermann 1895, which is a synonym for Histiona (Histionidae, Discoba, Excavata).
