= Litostroma =

Litostroma Temporal range: Pennsylvanian

Scientific classification
- Clade: Viridiplantae
- Division: incertae sedis
- Genus: Litostroma; Mamay, 1959

Species
- L. oklahomense Mamay, 1959

Extinct genus of algae

Litostroma is a genus of marine alga that may be a red, although green and brown affinities have also been proposed. It consists of single-cell-thick thalli that reached about 6 mm in diameter and 140 μm thickness.
