= Jean Victor Audouin =

French naturalist (1797–1841)

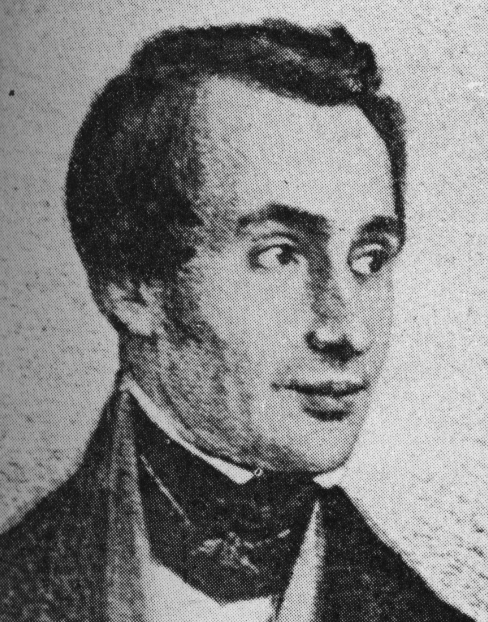
- Born: 27 April 1797; Paris, France
- Died: 9 November 1841 (aged 44); Paris, France
- Scientific career
- Fields: Entomology; Herpetology; Ornithology; Malacology
- Institutions: Muséum National d'Histoire Naturelle; Société entomologique de France; Royal Swedish Academy of Sciences

Jean Victor Audouin (27 April 1797 – 9 November 1841), sometimes Victor Audouin, was a French naturalist, an entomologist, herpetologist, ornithologist, and malacologist.

== Biography ==
Audouin was born in Paris and was educated in the field of medicine. In 1824 he was appointed assistant to Pierre André Latreille, professor of entomology at the Muséum National d'Histoire Naturelle, where in 1833 he became Latreille's successor. In 1838 he became a member of the French Academy of Sciences.

His principal work, Histoire des insectes nuisibles à la vigne (1842), was completed after his death by Henri Milne-Edwards and Émile Blanchard. Many of his papers appeared in the Annales des sciences naturelles, which, with Adolphe Theodore Brongniart and Jean-Baptiste Dumas, he founded in 1824, as well as in the proceedings of the Société entomologique de France, of which he was one of the founders in 1832. In 1833, he was elected a foreign member of the Royal Swedish Academy of Sciences.

Audouin also contributed to other branches of natural history. With Brongniart and Jean Baptiste Bory de Saint-Vincent, he was co-author of the Dictionnaire Classique d'Histoire Naturelle, and with Henri Milne-Edwards, he collaborated on a study of marine animals found in French coastal waters. He also completed Marie Jules César Savigny's ornithological section of Description de l'Egypte (1826). Audouin also studied amphibians and reptiles, and from 1827 to 1829 he described four new species of lizards and one new species of frog.

In 1843, mycologist David Gruby named the fungal species Microsporum audouinii after him. Audouin's gull (Larus audouinii) is a species of bird named in his honour, as is the red alga Audouinella, and in the French language, the term poche copulatrice d'Audouin (the copulatory pouch of Audouin) is another name for the spermatheca.

== Publications ==
- Histoire des insectes nuisibles à la vigne et particulièrement de la Pyrale qui dévaste les vignobles des départements de la Côte-d'Or, de Saône-et-Loire, du Rhône, de l'Hérault, des Pyrénées-Orientales, de la Haute-Garonne, de la Charente-Inférieure, de la Marne et de Seine-et-Oise, avec l'indication des moyens qu'on doit employer pour la combattre... Paris, Fortin, Masson, 1842
