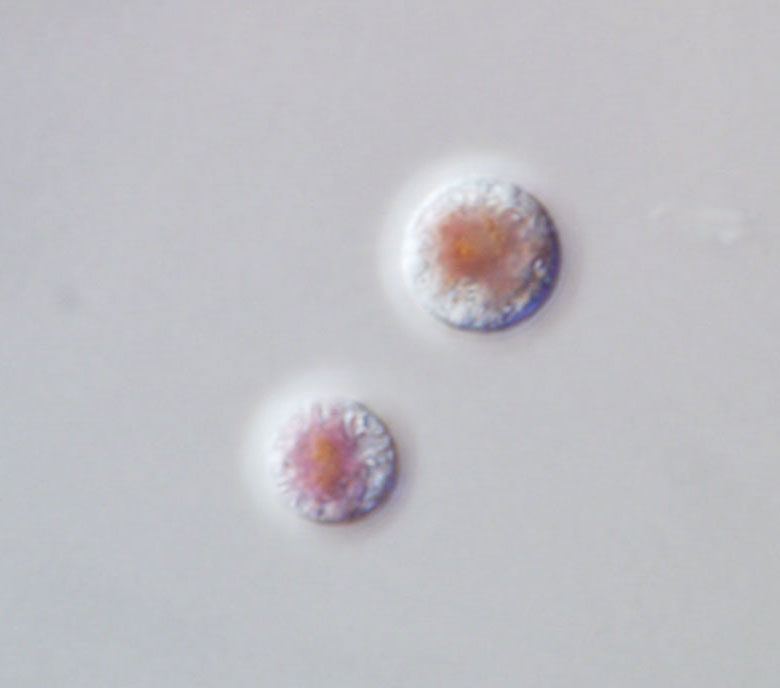
- Porphyridium purpureum

Scientific classification
- Domain: Eukaryota
- Clade: Archaeplastida
- Division: Rhodophyta
- Subdivision: Proteorhodophytina
- Class: Porphyridiophyceae; M.Shameel
- Order: Porphyridiales; Kylin
- Family: Porphyridiaceae; Kylin

= Porphyridiaceae =

Class of algae

Porphyridiophyceae is a class of red algae.

This class includes a single monotypic order, Porphyridiales, with a single family, Porphyridiaceae.

== Species ==
Porphyridiophyceae contains three genera and six recognized species as of 2024.

- Porphyridiophyceae
  - Porphyridiales
    - Porphyridiaceae
      - Erythrolobus
        - Erythrolobus australicus
        - Erythrolobus coxiae
        - Erythrolobus madagascarensis
      - Porphyridium
        - Porphyridium purpureum
        - Porphyridium sordidum
      - Timspurckia
        - Timspurckia oligopyrenoides
