= Rhodella =

Scientific classification
- Clade: Archaeplastida
- Division: Rhodophyta
- Class: Rhodellophyceae
- Order: Glaucosphaerales
- Family: Glaucosphaeeraceae
- Genus: Rhodella; L.V.Evans (1970)
- Species: R. violaceae

Binomial name
- Rhodella violaceae (Kornmann) Wehrmeyer

Synonyms
- (Species): Rhodella maculata L.V.Evans; Porphyridium violaceum Kornmann

Genus of algae

Rhodella is a monotypic genus of red algae containing only one species, Rhodella violaceae. The genus has formerly included a few other species but have since been synonymized, such as Rhodella reticulata, Rhodella grisea (both synonyms of Dixoniella grisea), and Rhodella cyanea (synonym of Neorhodella cyanea).
