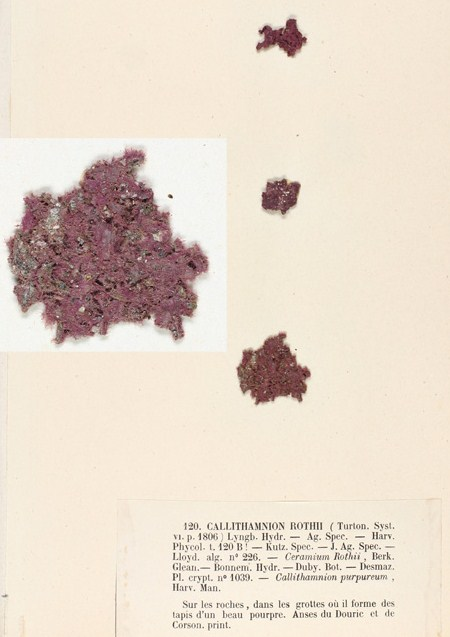
- Rhodochorton purpureum

Scientific classification
- Clade: Archaeplastida
- Division: Rhodophyta
- Class: Florideophyceae
- Subclass: Nemaliophycidae
- Order: Acrochaetiales; Feldmann

Families
- Acrochaetiaceae Fritsch ex W.R.Taylor; Ottiaceae Entwisle, J.R.Evans, M.L.Vis & G.W.Saunders

= Acrochaetiales =

Order of algae

Acrochaetiales is an order of red algae.

== Taxonomy ==
Acrochaetiales contains two families and six genera:

- Acrochaetiaceae Fritsch ex W.R.Taylor
  - Acrochaetium Nägeli (synonyms: Chromastrum Papenfuss, Kylinia Rosenvinge, Liagorophila Yamada, Rhodochortonopsis Yamada)
  - Audouinella Bory
  - Grania (Rosenvinge) Kylin
  - Rhodochorton Nägeli (synonym: Thamnidium Thuret)
  - Rhododrewia S.L.Clayden & G.W.Saunders
- Ottiaceae Entwisle, J.R.Evans, M.L.Vis & G.W.Saunders
  - Ottia Entwisle, J.R.Evans, M.L.Vis & G.W.Saunders
