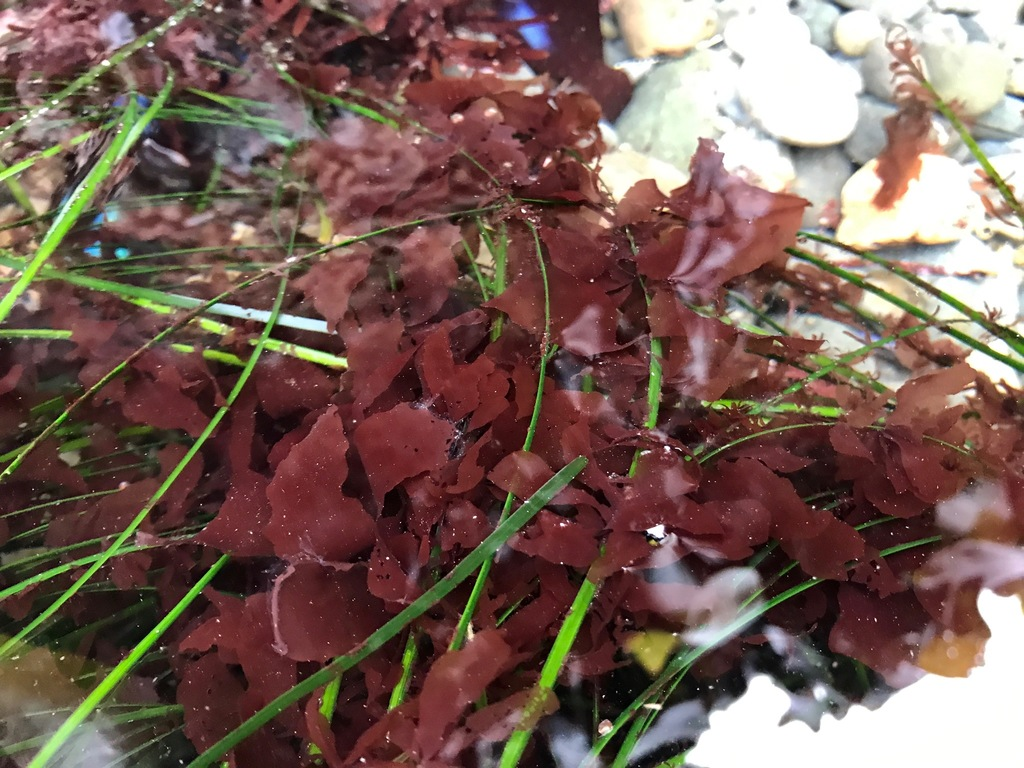
- Smithora naiadum

Scientific classification
- Domain: Eukaryota
- Clade: Archaeplastida
- Division: Rhodophyta
- Subdivision: Proteorhodophytina; Muñoz-Gómez & al. 2017

Classes
- Compsopogonophyceae; Porphyridiophyceae; Rhodellophyceae; Stylonematophyceae

= Proteorhodophytina =

Subphylum of red algae

Proteorhodophytina is a subdivision of red algae containing unicellular, pseudofilamentous, and filamentous photosynthetic eukaryotes.

== Taxonomy ==
- Class Compsopogonophyceae G. W. Saunders & Hommersand
- Class Porphyridiophyceae M. Shameel
- Class Rhodellophyceae Cavalier-Smith
- Class Stylonematophyceae H. S. Yoon, K. M. Müller, R. G. Sheath, F. D. Ott & D. Bhattacharya

== Genomics ==
Plastid genomes of Proteorhodophytina are large, highly diversified, and intron-rich which contrasts with the generally compact and slow-evolving plastid genomes of other rhodophytes. Mitochondrial genomes of Proteorhodophytina are also larger than in other groups of red algae.
