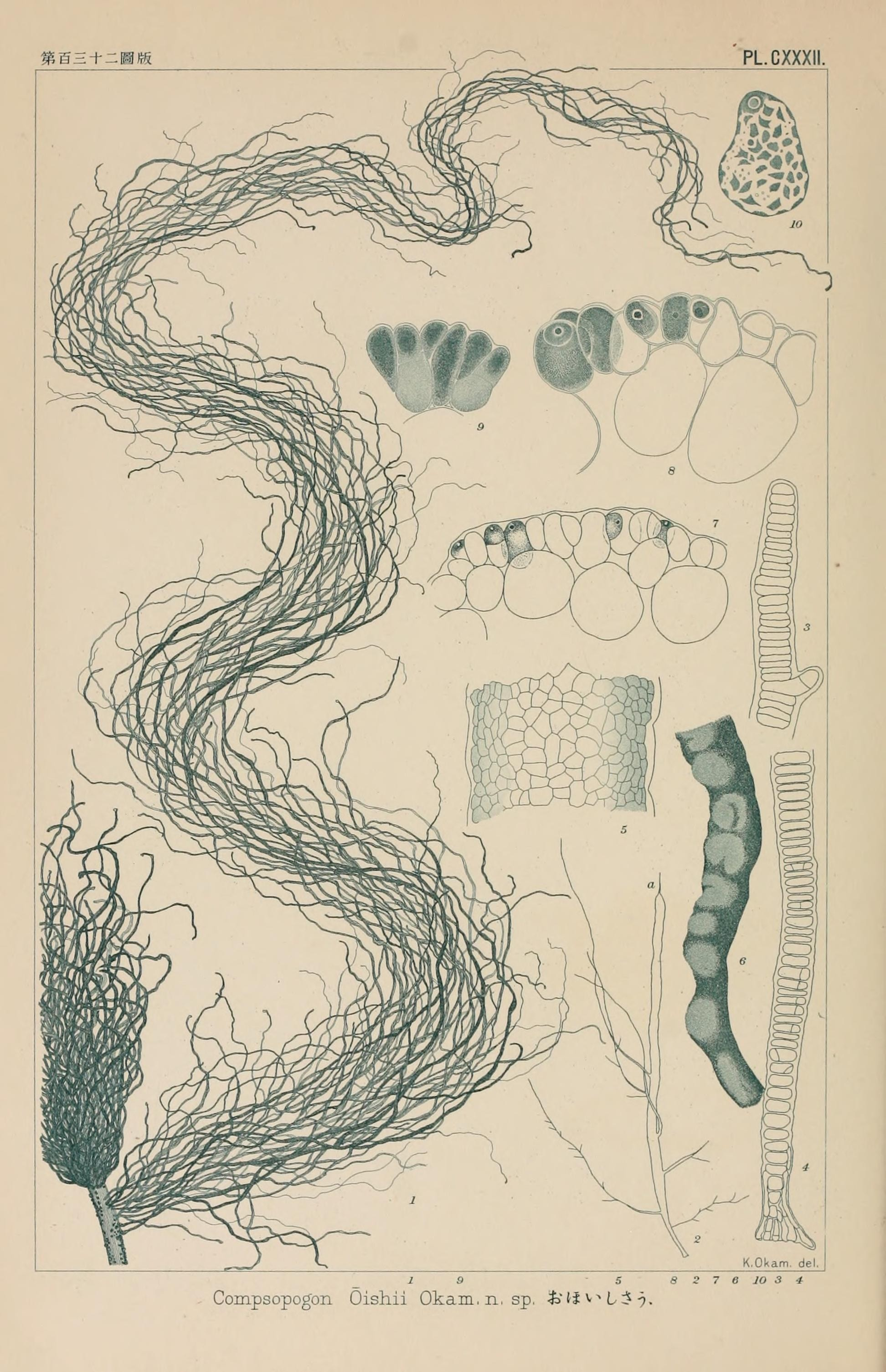
- Compsopogon sp.

Scientific classification
- Domain: Eukaryota
- Supergroup: Archaeplastida
- Division: Rhodophyta
- Class: Compsopogonophyceae
- Order: Compsopogonales; Skuja, 1939

Families
- Boldiaceae Herndon, 1964; Compsopogonaceae F.Schmitz, 1896

= Compsopogonales =

Order of algae

Compsopogonales is an order of mostly fresh water red algae.
