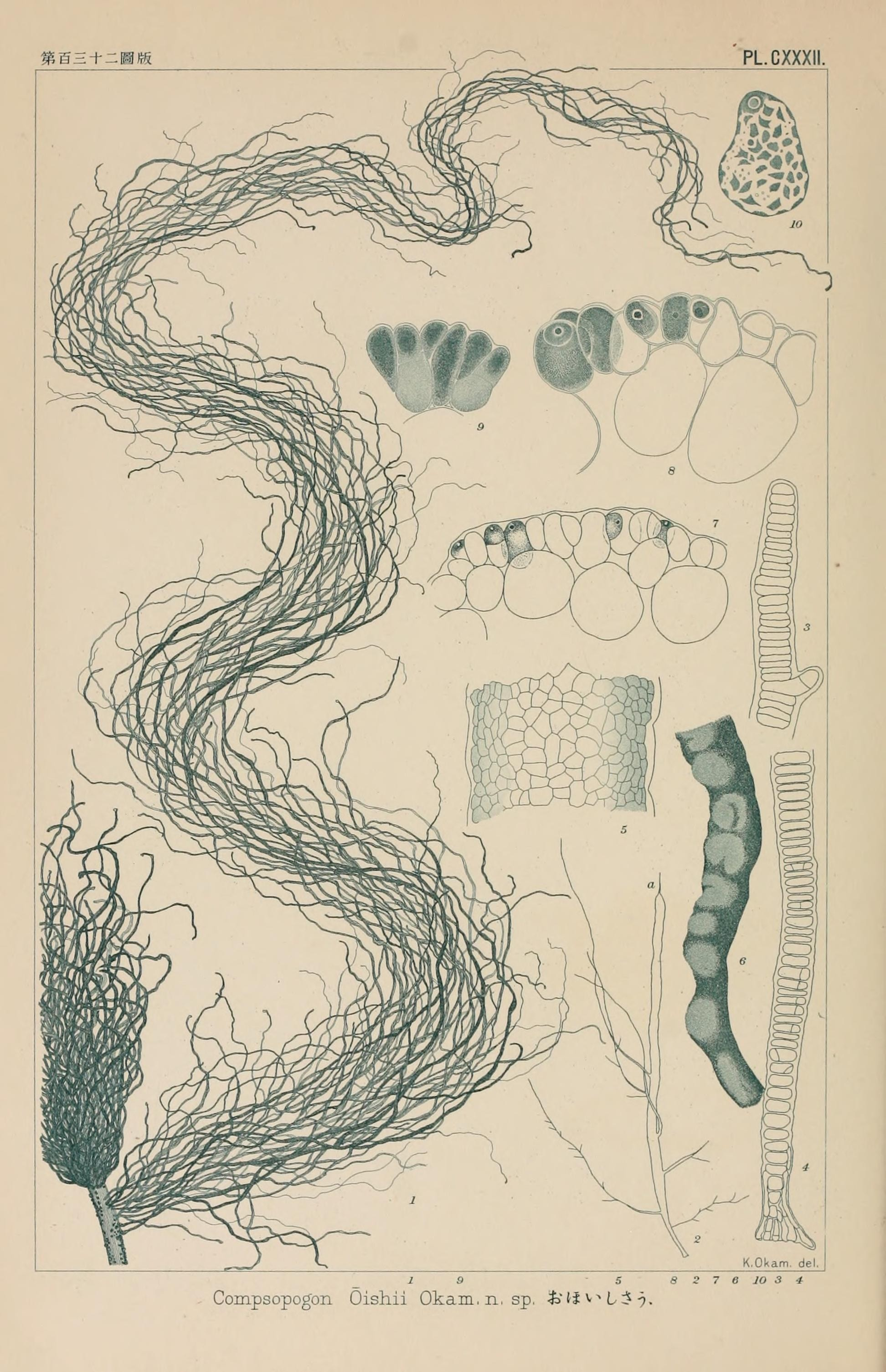
- Compsopogon sp.

Scientific classification
- Domain: Eukaryota
- Supergroup: Archaeplastida
- Division: Rhodophyta
- Subdivision: Proteorhodophytina
- Class: Compsopogonophyceae; G.W.Saunders & Hommersand, 2004

Orders
- Compsopogonales; Erythropeltidales; Rhodochaetales

= Compsopogonophyceae =

Class of algae

Compsopogonophyceae is a class of red algae.
