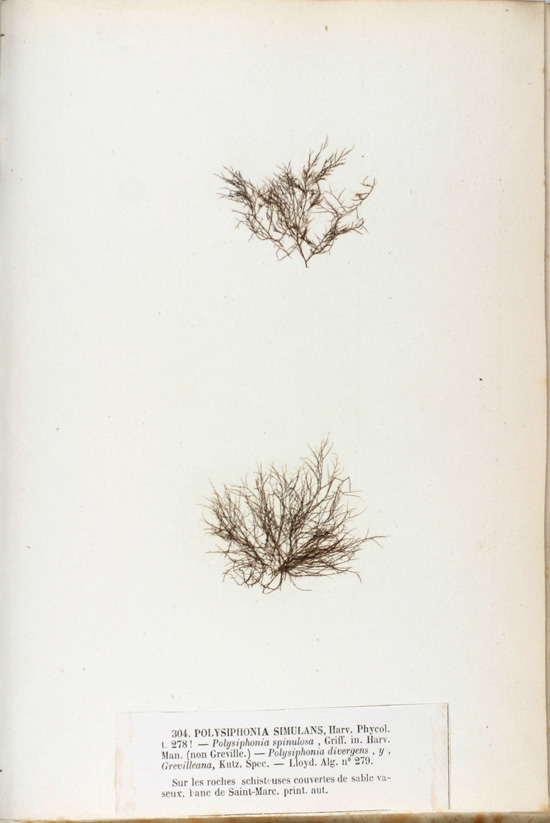

Scientific classification
- Clade: Archaeplastida
- Division: Rhodophyta
- Class: Florideophyceae
- Order: Ceramiales
- Family: Rhodomelaceae
- Genus: Vertebrata
- Species: V. simulans

Binomial name
- Vertebrata simulans (Harvey) Kuntze

Synonyms
- Polysiphonia simulans Harvey

= Vertebrata simulans =

Species of alga

Vertebrata simulans (Polysiphonia simulans) Harvey is a small densely branched alga in the Division Rhodophyta.

== Description ==
This small marine algae grows to a height of no more than 8 cm. the branches are dense forming tufts. It does not show a clear main axis. The central axes is surrounded by 10 to 12 pericentral cells all of the same length and is without cortication. The branches are irregularly arranged.

== Habitat ==
Generally epiphytic at the low littoral.
