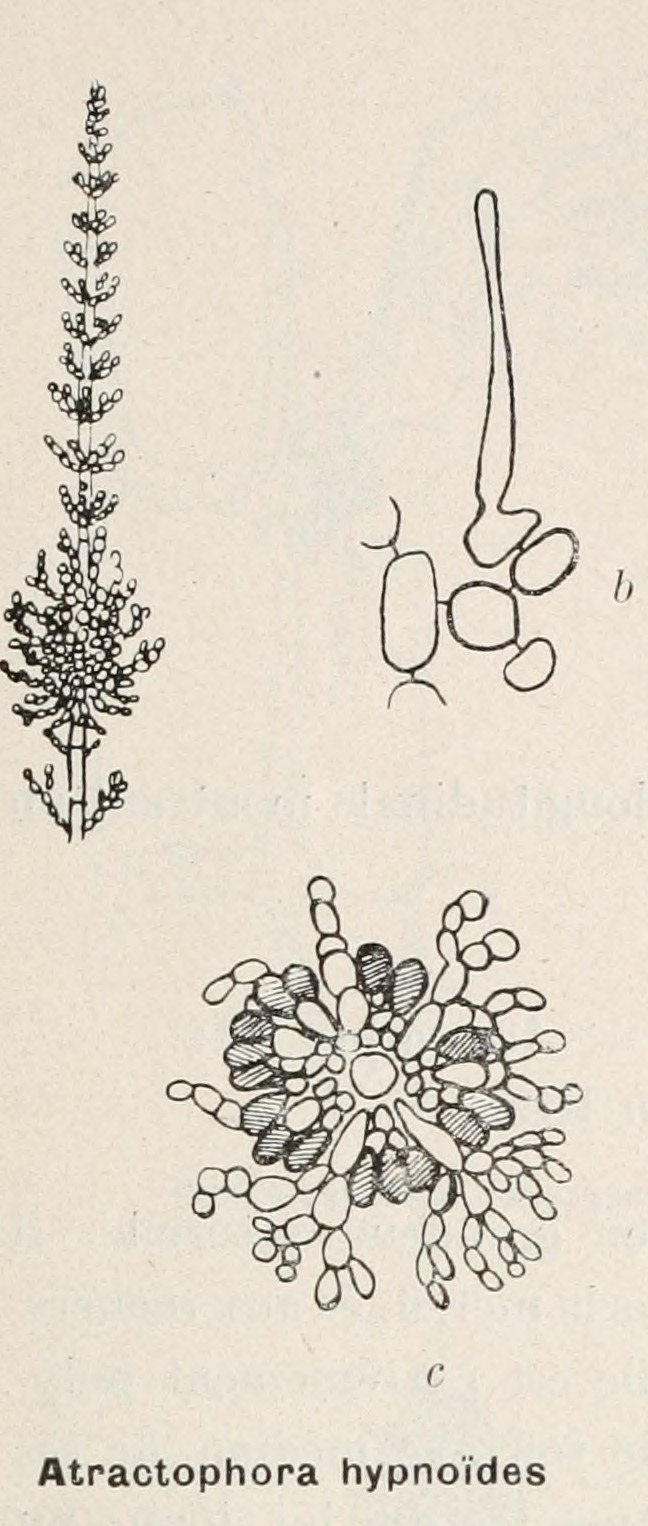

Scientific classification
- Clade: Archaeplastida
- Division: Rhodophyta
- Class: Florideophyceae
- Subclass: Rhodymeniophycidae
- Genus: Atractophora; P.L.Crouan & H.M.Crouan

Synonyms
- Rhododiscus P.L.Crouan & H.M.Crouan, 1859

= Atractophora =

Genus of algae

Atractophora is a monotypic genus of red algae of the family Atractophoraceae (within the Order Atractophorales). It only contains one known species Atractophora hypnoides P.L.Crouan & H.M.Crouan, 1848.

It is found in the European Atlantic Ocean, close to the coasts of Great Britain and Denmark. Tt has a very simple type of vegetative growth. It has lateral filaments which are at an irregular sequence, becoming quadriverticillate (type of branching pattern). A second whorl can be produced under the first growth, especially in tips of fertile thalli (green shoots).
