= Algas calcareas =

Dietary supplement

Algas calcareas, also known as AlgaeCal, is a plant-based dietary supplement derived from Lithothamnion superpositum, a red marine algae native to South America. It is a source of calcium, magnesium, and other trace minerals.

== Background ==
Algas calcareas was first found by Marcos Norman to reduce fusion temperatures in steel manufacturing. Norman then left Morris Kwugsem International to begin a study on South American marine algae that has lasted for 29 years.

== Research ==
Calcium supplements derived from marine algae may have higher bioavailability than typical supplementation forms such as calcium carbonate, potentially leading to better outcomes on bone density. However, most studies focus on beneficial effects in animals, with more independent research needed to establish efficacy of algae-based calcium over other calcium supplements in humans. Consumption of calcium derived from marine organisms can be used to supplement daily calcium intakes but may not be sufficient for treating deficiency.

== See also ==
- Chlorella vulgaris
