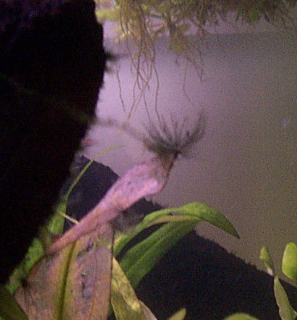

Scientific classification
- Clade: Archaeplastida
- Division: Rhodophyta
- Class: Florideophyceae
- Order: Acrochaetiales
- Family: Acrochaetiaceae
- Genus: Audouinella; Bory de Saint-Vincent

= Audouinella =

Genus of algae

Audouinella, also known as black algae, is a widespread genus of red algae, found in marine and freshwater environments.

The form known as "black brush algae" (or "black beard algae", BBA for short) is a particular nuisance in aquaria, since most algae eater fish and invertebrates avoid it.

== Description ==
J.B. Bory de Saint-Vincent named the genus in 1823, in honour of his co-editor in the Dictionnaire Classique d'Histoire Naturelle, J.V. Audouin.

Black algae species are not all black; they grow as small tufts of red, brown, or black hairlike filaments on any solid surface – most dramatically in freshwater, on the edges of slow-growing leaves. Its thalli are composed of uniaxial filaments, the ends of which often contain elongate hairs.

Audouinella reproduce via spores, most commonly asexually, while sexual reproduction is known in rare cases.

Black algae are typically tolerant of high levels of pollution, acidity, and thrive on dissolved phosphate and nitrates. In natural ecosystems, the genus that infests aquariums is found in unpolluted lotic systems.

Audouinella growth can be induced in planted aquariums by limiting and varying the CO_{2} concentration. It has been tested for germination and new growth using fertilizers NO_{3} and PO_{4}, but results were negative from a decade of observations. While other possible means of promoting growth may exist, the adjustment of CO_{2} concentration is the most consistent, as shown in practical tests by aquarists.

== See also ==
- Algae
- Red algae
- Algae eater
