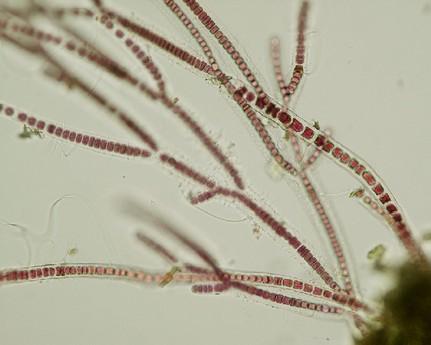
- Stylonema alsidii

Scientific classification
- Clade: Archaeplastida
- Division: Rhodophyta
- Subdivision: Proteorhodophytina
- Class: Stylonematophyceae; H.S.Yoon, K.M.Müller, R.G.Sheath, F.D.Ott & D.Bhattacharya (2006)

Orders
- Rufusiales; Stylonematales

= Stylonematophyceae =

Class of algae

Stylonematophyceae is a class of red algae.
