= Rhodellophyceae =

Scientific classification
- Clade: Archaeplastida
- Division: Rhodophyta
- Subdivision: Proteorhodophytina
- Class: Rhodellophyceae; Cavalier-Smith

Orders
- Dixoniellales; Glaucosphaerales; Rhodellales

Class of algae

Rhodellophyceae is a class of red algae.
