= Tetrasporaphyte =

Algae life phase

The tetrasporaphyte is a phase in the life history of algae which bear tetrasporangia. This phase is usually morphologically similar to the gametophyte phase.
