= Carpospore =

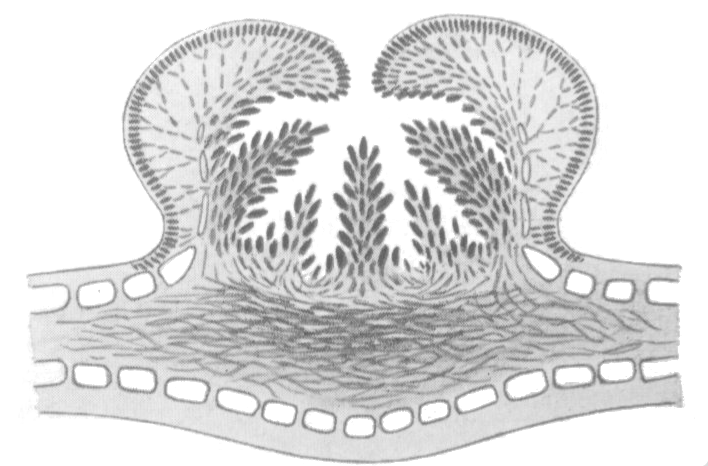
Cystocarp of Amphiplexia hymenocladioides

A carpospore is a diploid spore produced by red algae. After fertilization, the alga's carpogonium subdivides into carpospores, and generally the largest type of spore (larger than bispores, which are larger again than tetraspores). The wall of the carposporangium then breaks down, releasing the spores into the environment.
