= Carpogonium =

Cell type found in algae

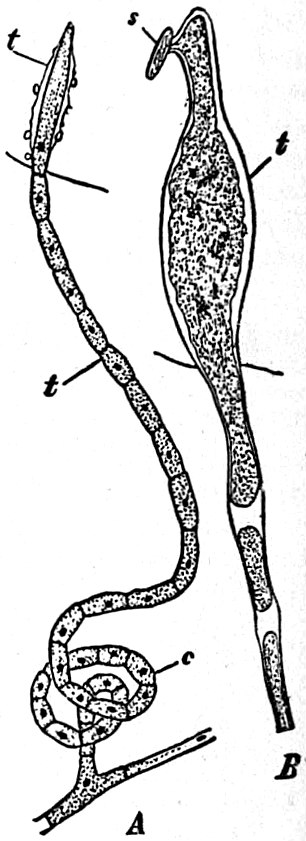
Collema crispum A, Carpogonium, c, with its trichogyne t. B, Apex of the trichogyne with the spermatium, s, attached.

The carpogonium (plural carpogonia) is the female organ in the red algae (Rhodophyta) which have a highly specialized type of reproduction. It contains the reproductive nucleus. It may contain a number of cells usually without chloroplasts. It shows an elongated process which is the receptive organ for the male gametes.

It gives birth to the carpospores.

It may also have hairlike structures called trichogynes which receive sperm before fertilization takes place.
