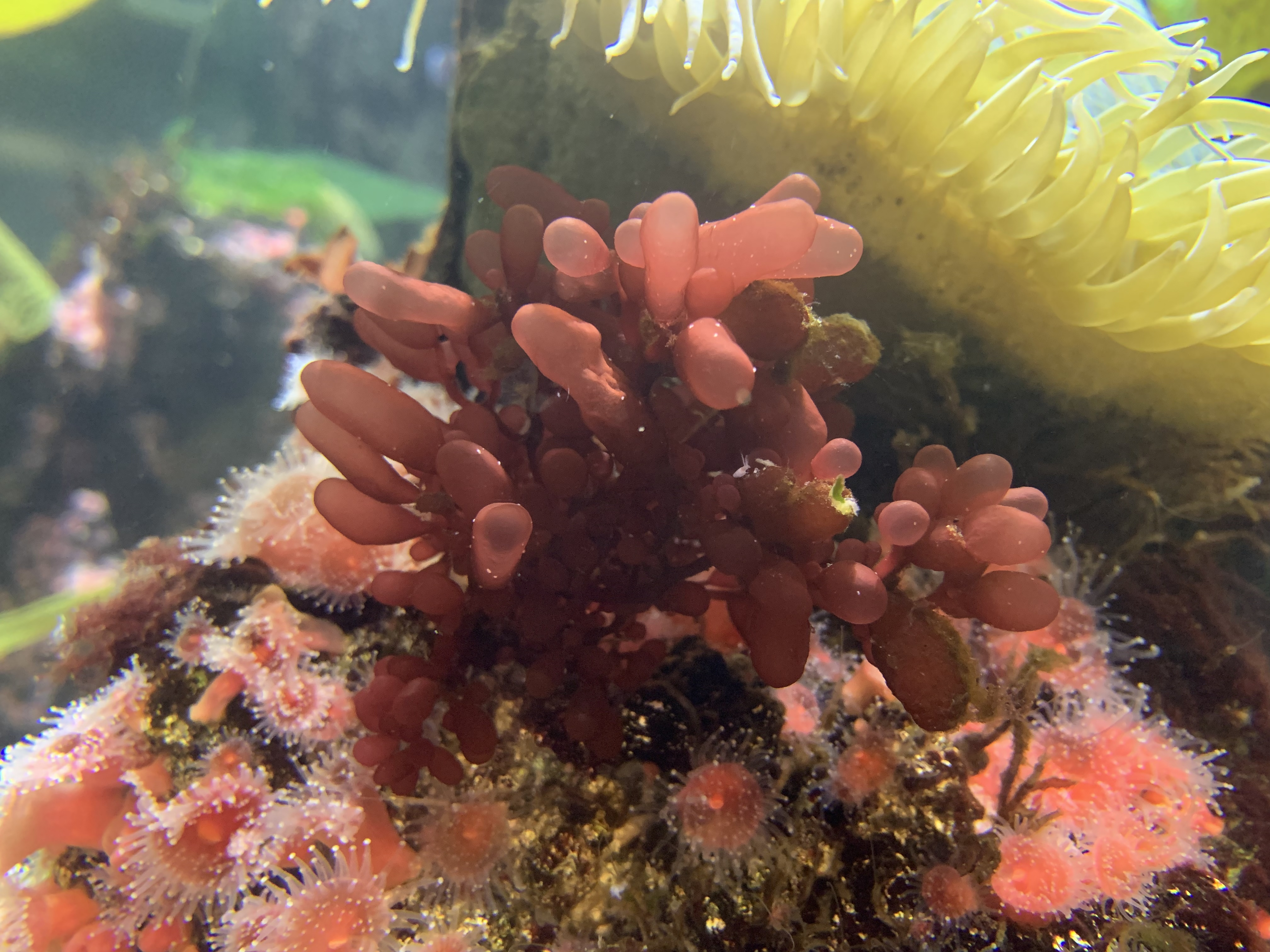
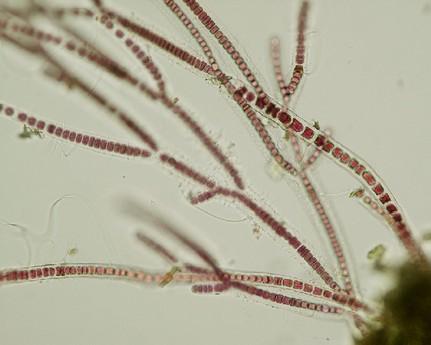
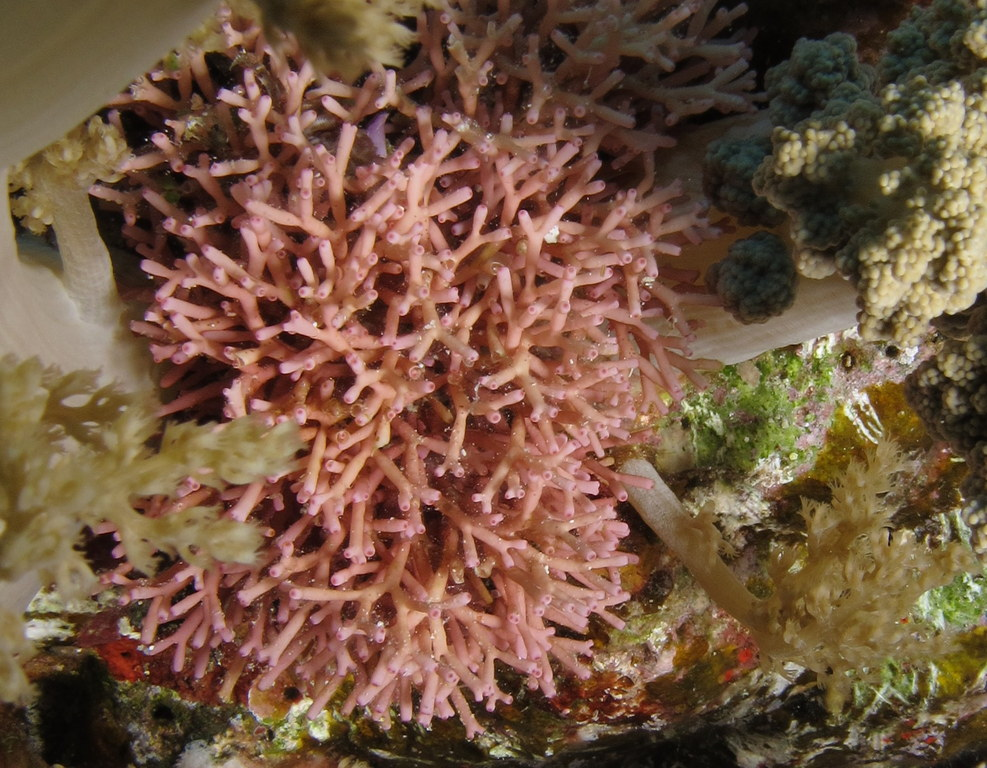
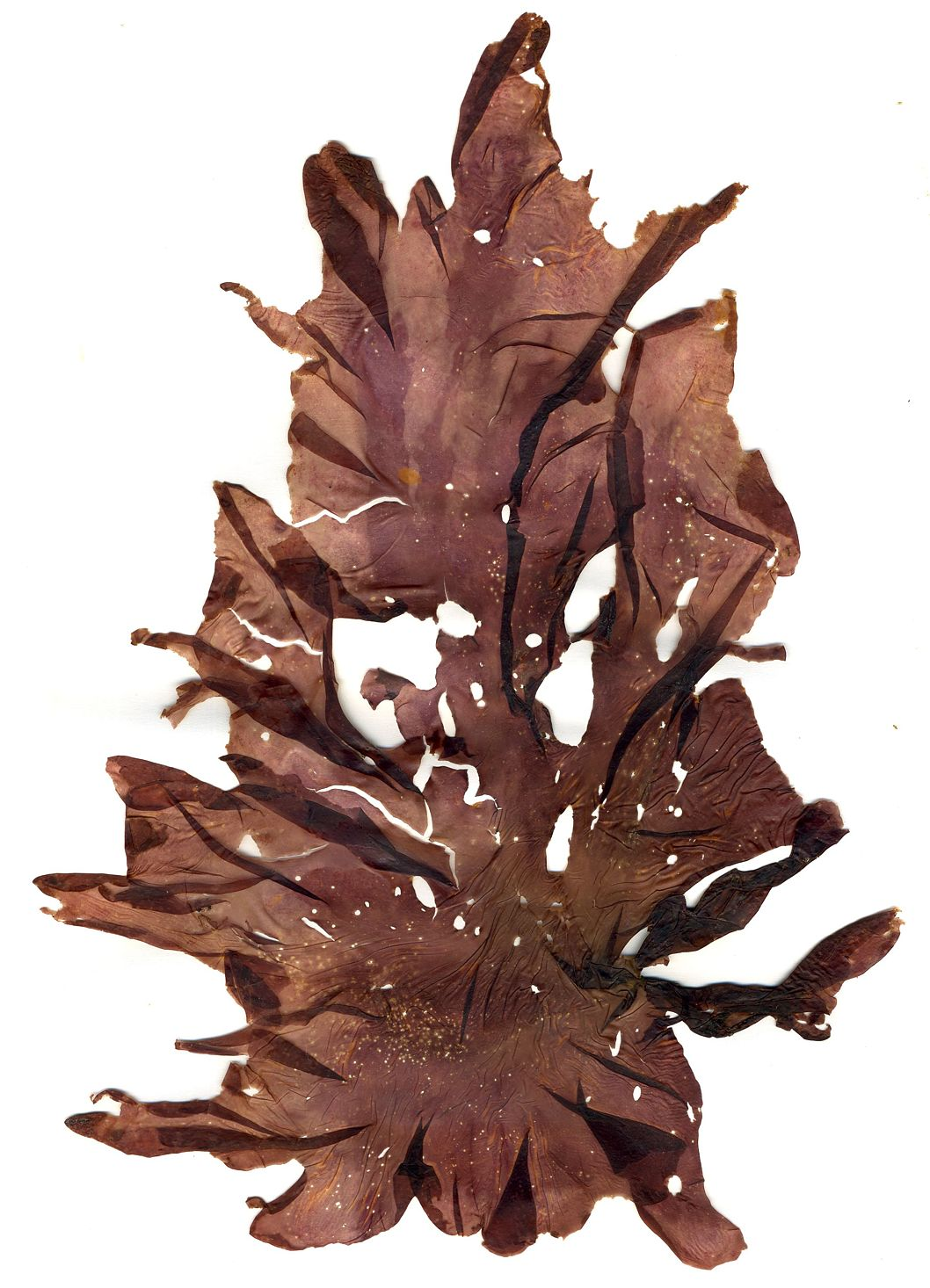
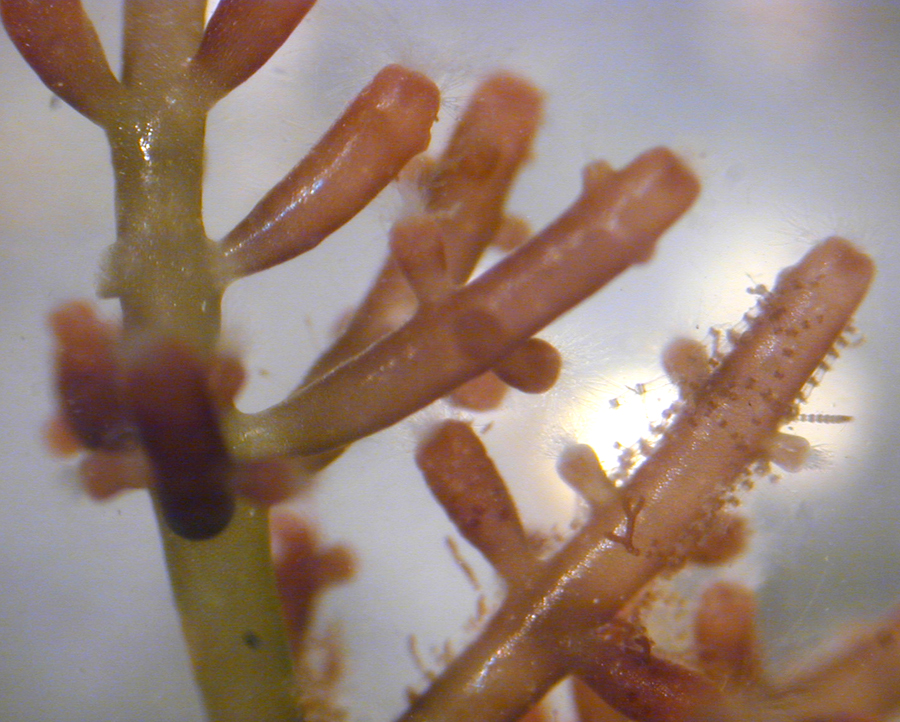
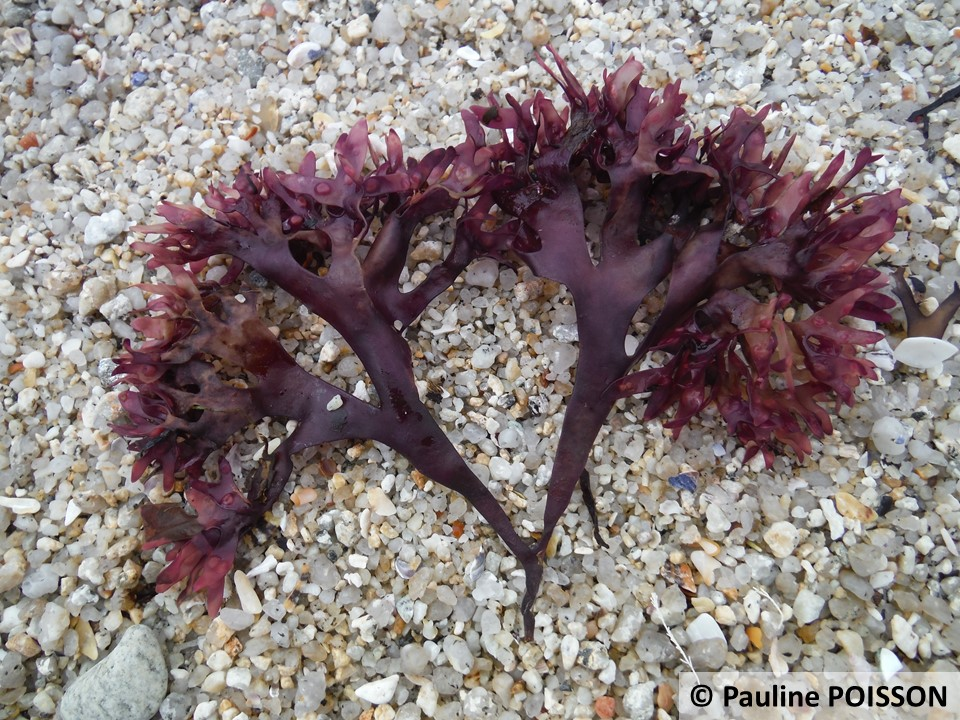
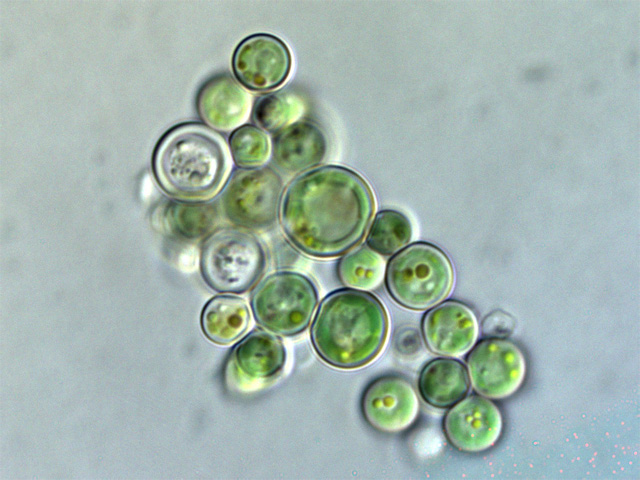
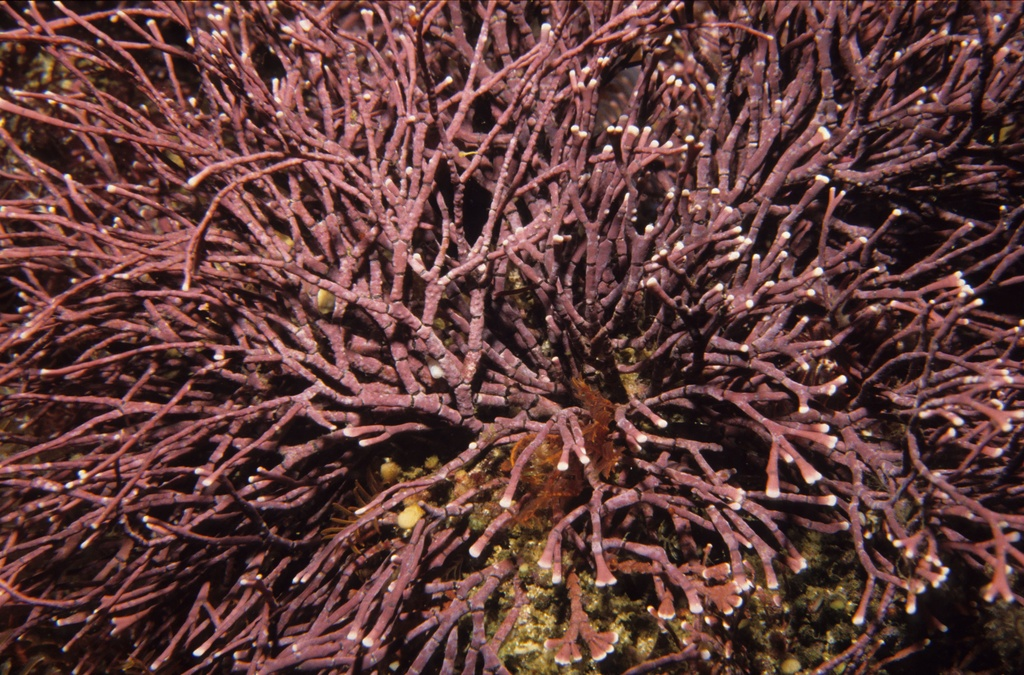
- Rhodymeniales Stylonematales Nemaliales Bangiales Ceramiales Gigartinales Cyanidiales Corallinales

Scientific classification
- Domain: Eukaryota
- Supergroup: Archaeplastida
- Clade: Rhodaria
- Division: Rhodophyta; Wettstein 1922

Clades
- Rhodophytina; Eurhodophytina; Bangiophyceae; Florideophyceae; Proteorhodophytina; Compsopogonophyceae; Porphyridiophyceae; Rhodellophyceae; Stylonematophyceae; Cyanidiophytina; Cyanidiophyceae

= Red algae =

Red algae Temporal range: Mesoproterozoic–present

Division of plant life

Red algae, or Rhodophyta (/roʊˈdɒfɪtə/, /ˌroʊdəˈfaɪtə/; from Ancient Greek ῥόδον (rhódon) 'rose' and φυτόν (phutón) 'plant'), make up one of the oldest and largest phyla of eukaryotic algae, containing over 7,000 recognized species within over 900 genera amidst ongoing taxonomic revisions. The majority of species (6,793) are in the class Florideophyceae, and mostly consist of multicellular marine algae, including many notable seaweeds. Red algae are abundant in marine habitats. Approximately 5% of red algae species occur in freshwater environments, with greater concentrations in warmer areas. This may be due to an evolutionary bottleneck in which the last common ancestor lost about 25% of its core genes and much of its evolutionary plasticity.

Red algae form a distinct group characterized by eukaryotic cells without flagella and centrioles, chloroplasts without external endoplasmic reticulum or unstacked (stroma) thylakoids, and use phycobiliproteins as accessory pigments, which give them their red color. Despite their name, red algae can vary in color from bright green, soft pink, resembling brown algae, to shades of red and purple, and may be almost black at greater depths and are only called red algae due to the phycobiliproteins and the reddish members. Unlike green algae, red algae store sugars as food reserves outside the chloroplasts as floridean starch, a type of starch that consists of highly branched amylopectin without amylose. Most red algae reproduce sexually. The life history of red algae is typically an alternation of generations that may have three generations rather than two. Coralline algae, which secrete calcium carbonate and play a major role in building coral reefs, belong there.

Red algae such as Palmaria palmata (dulse) and Porphyra species (laver/nori/gim) are a traditional part of European and Asian cuisines and are used to make products such as agar, carrageenans, and other food additives.

== Description ==
Red algal morphology is diverse, ranging from unicellular forms to complex parenchymatous and non- parenchymatous thallus. Red algae have double cell walls. The outer layers contain the polysaccharides agarose and agaropectin that can be extracted from the cell walls as agar by boiling. The internal walls are mostly cellulose. They also have the most gene-rich plastid genomes known.

=== Cell structure ===
Red algae do not have flagella and centrioles during their entire life cycle. The distinguishing characters of red algal cell structure include the presence of normal spindle fibres, microtubules, un-stacked photosynthetic membranes, phycobilin pigment granules, pit connection between cells, filamentous genera, and the absence of chloroplast endoplasmic reticulum.

Representation of a Rhodophyte (red algae)

==== Chloroplasts ====
The presence of the water-soluble pigments called phycobilins (phycocyanobilin, phycoerythrobilin, phycourobilin and phycobiliviolin), which are localized into phycobilisomes, gives red algae their distinctive color. Their chloroplasts contain evenly spaced and ungrouped thylakoids and contain the pigments chlorophyll a, α- and β-carotene, lutein and zeaxanthin. Their chloroplasts are enclosed in a double membrane, lack grana and phycobilisomes on the stromal surface of the thylakoid membrane.

=== Storage products ===
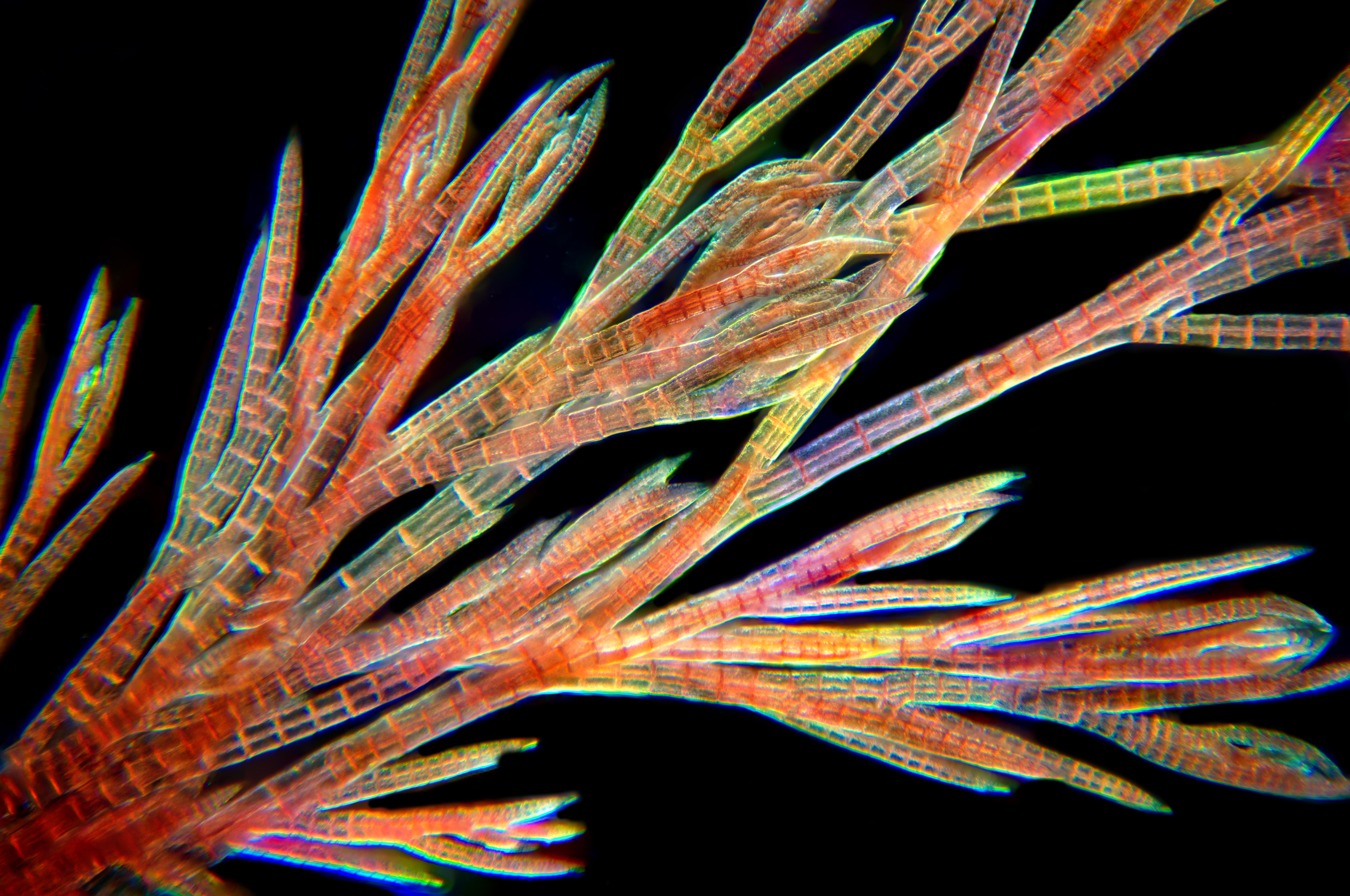
View of red algae tissue under the microscope

The major photosynthetic products include floridoside (major product), D‐isofloridoside, digeneaside, mannitol, sorbitol, dulcitol etc. Floridean starch (similar to amylopectin in land plants), a long-term storage product, is deposited freely (scattered) in the cytoplasm. The concentration of photosynthetic products are altered by the environmental conditions like change in pH, the salinity of medium, change in light intensity, nutrient limitation etc. When the salinity of the medium increases, the production of floridoside is increased in order to prevent water from leaving the algal cells.

=== Pit connections and pit plugs ===
==== Pit connections ====
Pit connections and pit plugs are unique and distinctive features of red algae that form during the process of cytokinesis following mitosis. In red algae, cytokinesis is incomplete. Typically, a small pore is left in the middle of the newly formed partition. The pit connection is formed where the daughter cells remain in contact.

Shortly after the pit connection is formed, cytoplasmic continuity is blocked by the generation of a pit plug, which is deposited in the wall gap that connects the cells.

Connections between cells having a common parent cell are called primary pit connections. Because apical growth is the norm in red algae, most cells have two primary pit connections, one to each adjacent cell.

Connections that exist between cells not sharing a common parent cell are labelled secondary pit connections. These connections are formed when an unequal cell division produced a nucleated daughter cell that then fuses to an adjacent cell. Patterns of secondary pit connections can be seen in the order Ceramiales.

==== Pit plugs ====
After a pit connection is formed, tubular membranes appear. A granular protein called the plug core then forms around the membranes. The tubular membranes eventually disappear. While some orders of red algae simply have a plug core, others have an associated membrane at each side of the protein mass, called cap membranes. The pit plug continues to exist between the cells until one of the cells dies. When this happens, the living cell produces a layer of wall material that seals off the plug.

==== Function ====
The pit connections have been suggested to function as structural reinforcement, or as avenues for cell-to-cell communication and transport in red algae, however little data supports this hypothesis.

=== Reproduction ===
The reproductive cycle of red algae may be triggered by factors such as day length. Red algae reproduce sexually as well as asexually. Asexual reproduction can occur through the production of spores and by vegetative means (fragmentation, cell division or propagules production).

==== Fertilization ====
Red algae lack motile sperm. Hence, they rely on water currents to transport their gametes to the female organs – although their sperm are capable of "gliding" to a carpogonium's trichogyne. Animals also help with the dispersal and fertilization of the gametes. The first species discovered to do so is the isopod Idotea balthica.

The trichogyne will continue to grow until it encounters a spermatium; once it has been fertilized, the cell wall at its base progressively thickens, separating it from the rest of the carpogonium at its base.

Upon their collision, the walls of the spermatium and carpogonium dissolve. The male nucleus divides and moves into the carpogonium; one half of the nucleus merges with the carpogonium's nucleus.

The polyamine spermine is produced, which triggers carpospore production.

Spermatangia may have long, delicate appendages, which increase their chances of "hooking up".

==== Life cycle ====
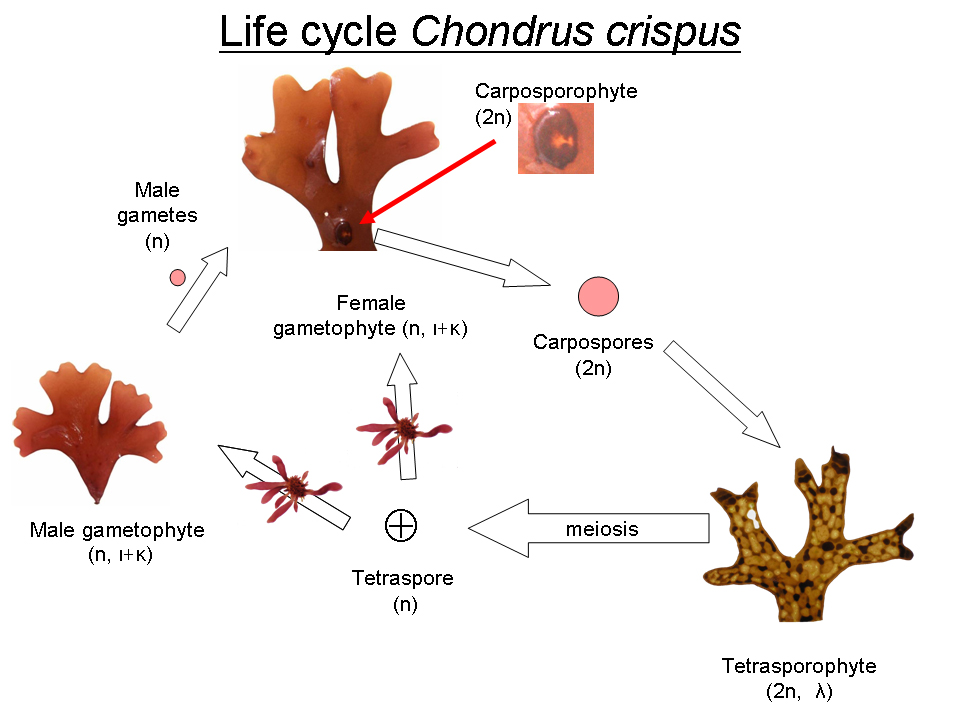
Life cycle with three generations in Chondrus crispus

They display alternation of generations. In addition to a gametophyte generation, many have two sporophyte generations, the carposporophyte-producing carpospores, which germinate into a tetrasporophyte – this produces spore tetrads, which dissociate and germinate into gametophytes. The gametophyte is typically (but not always) identical to the tetrasporophyte.

Carpospores may also germinate directly into thalloid gametophytes, or the carposporophytes may produce a tetraspore without going through a (free-living) tetrasporophyte phase. Tetrasporangia may be arranged in a row (zonate), in a cross (cruciate), or in a tetrad.

The carposporophyte may be enclosed within the gametophyte, which may cover it with branches to form a cystocarp.

The two following case studies may be helpful to understand some of the life histories algae may display:

In a simple case, such as Rhodochorton investiens:

In the carposporophyte: a spermatium merges with a trichogyne (a long hair on the female sexual organ), which then divides to form carposporangia – which produce carpospores.

Carpospores germinate into gametophytes, which produce sporophytes. Both of these are very similar; they produce monospores from monosporangia "just below a cross-wall in a filament" and their spores are "liberated through the apex of sporangial cell."

The spores of a sporophyte produce either tetrasporophytes. Monospores produced by this phase germinates immediately, with no resting phase, to form an identical copy of the parent. Tetrasporophytes may also produce a carpospore, which germinates to form another tetrasporophyte.

The gametophyte may replicate asexually using monospores, but also produces nonmotile sperm in spermatangia, and a lower, nucleus-containing "egg" region of the carpogonium.

A rather different example is Porphyra gardneri:

In its diploid phase, a carpospore can germinate to form a filamentous "conchocelis stage", which can also self-replicate using monospores. The conchocelis stage eventually produces conchosporangia. The resulting conchospore germinates to form a tiny prothallus with rhizoids, which develops to a cm-scale leafy thallus. This too can reproduce via monospores, which are produced inside the thallus itself. They can also reproduce via spermatia, produced internally, which are released to meet a prospective carpogonium in its conceptacle.

=== Chemistry ===
Algal group	δ^{13}C range
HCO_{3}-using red algae	−22.5‰ to −9.6‰
CO_{2}-using red algae	−34.5‰ to −29.9‰
Brown algae	−20.8‰ to −10.5‰
Green algae	−20.3‰ to −8.8‰

The δ^{13}C values of red algae reflect their lifestyles. The largest difference results from their photosynthetic metabolic pathway: algae that use HCO_{3} as a carbon source have less negative δ^{13}C values than those that only use CO_{2}. An additional difference of about 1.71‰ separates groups intertidal from those below the lowest tide line, which are never exposed to atmospheric carbon. The latter group uses the more ^{13}C-negative CO_{2} dissolved in sea water, whereas those with access to atmospheric carbon reflect the more positive signature of this reserve.

Photosynthetic pigments of Rhodophyta are chlorophylls a and d. Red algae are red due to phycoerythrin. They contain the sulfated polysaccharide carrageenan in the amorphous sections of their cell walls, although red algae from the genus Porphyra contain porphyran. They also produce a specific type of tannin called phlorotannins, but in a lower amount than brown algae do.

== Taxonomy ==
In the classification system of Adl et al. 2005, the red algae are classified in the Archaeplastida, along with the glaucophytes and the green algae plus land plants (Viridiplantae or Chloroplastida). The authors use a hierarchical arrangement where the clade names do not signify rank; the class name Rhodophyceae is used for the red algae. No subdivisions are given; the authors say, "Traditional subgroups are artificial constructs, and no longer valid." Many subsequent studies provided evidence that is in agreement for monophyly in the Archaeplastida (including red algae). However, other studies have suggested Archaeplastida is paraphyletic. As of January 2020, the general consensus is that Archaeplastida is paraphyletic.

Below are other published taxonomies of the red algae using molecular and traditional alpha taxonomic data; however, the taxonomy of the red algae is still in a state of flux (with classification above the level of order having received little scientific attention for most of the 20th century).

- If the kingdom Plantae is defined as the Archaeplastida, then red algae will be part of that group.
- If Plantae are defined more narrowly, to be the Viridiplantae, then the red algae might be excluded.

A major research initiative to reconstruct the Red Algal Tree of Life (RedToL) using phylogenetic and genomic approach is funded by the National Science Foundation as part of the Assembling the Tree of Life Program.

=== Classification comparison ===
Classification system according to Saunders and Hommersand 2004			Classification system according to Hwan Su Yoon et al. 2006			Orders	Multicellular?	Pit plugs?	Example
Subkingdom Rhodoplantae	Phylum Cyanidiophyta	Class Cyanidiophyceae Merola et al.	Phylum Rhodophyta Wettstein	Subphylum Cyanidiophytina subphylum novus	Class Cyanidiophyceae Merola et al.	Cyanidiales	No	No	Cyanidioschyzon merolae
Subkingdom Rhodoplantae	Phylum Rhodophyta Wettstein	Subphylum Rhodellophytina Class Rhodellophyceae Cavalier-Smith	Phylum Rhodophyta Wettstein	Subphylum Rhodophytina subphylum novus	Class Rhodellophyceae Cavalier-Smith	Rhodellales	No	No	Rhodella
Subkingdom Rhodoplantae	Phylum Rhodophyta Wettstein	Subphylum Rhodellophytina Class Rhodellophyceae Cavalier-Smith	Phylum Rhodophyta Wettstein	Subphylum Rhodophytina subphylum novus	Class Stylonematophyceae classis nova	Rufusiales, Stylonematales	Yes	No	Stylonema
Subkingdom Rhodoplantae	Phylum Rhodophyta Wettstein	Subphylum Rhodellophytina Class Rhodellophyceae Cavalier-Smith	Phylum Rhodophyta Wettstein	Subphylum Rhodophytina subphylum novus	Class Porphyridiophyceae classis nova	Porphyridiales	No	No	Porphyridium cruentum
Subkingdom Rhodoplantae	Phylum Rhodophyta Wettstein	Subphylum Metarhodophytina Class Compsopogonophyceae Saunders et Hommersand	Phylum Rhodophyta Wettstein	Subphylum Rhodophytina subphylum novus	Class Compsopogonophyceae Saunders et Hommersand	Compsopogonales, Rhodochaetales, Erythropeltidales	Yes	No	Compsopogon
Subkingdom Rhodoplantae	Phylum Rhodophyta Wettstein	Subphylum Eurhodophytina Class Bangiophyceae Wettstein	Phylum Rhodophyta Wettstein	Subphylum Rhodophytina subphylum novus	Class Bangiophyceae Wettstein	Bangiales	Yes	Yes	Bangia, "Porphyra"
Subkingdom Rhodoplantae	Phylum Rhodophyta Wettstein	Class Florideophyceae Cronquist Subclass Hildenbrandiophycidae	Phylum Rhodophyta Wettstein	Subphylum Rhodophytina subphylum novus	Class Florideophyceae Cronquist	Hildenbrandiales	Yes	Yes	Hildenbrandia
Subkingdom Rhodoplantae	Phylum Rhodophyta Wettstein	Class Florideophyceae Cronquist Subclass Nemaliophycidae	Phylum Rhodophyta Wettstein	Subphylum Rhodophytina subphylum novus	Class Florideophyceae Cronquist	Batrachospermales, Balliales, Balbianiales, Nemaliales, Colaconematales, Acrochaetiales, Palmariales, Thoreales	Yes	Yes	Nemalion
Subkingdom Rhodoplantae	Phylum Rhodophyta Wettstein		Phylum Rhodophyta Wettstein	Subphylum Rhodophytina subphylum novus	Class Florideophyceae Cronquist	Rhodogorgonales, Corallinales	Yes	Yes	Corallina officinalis
Subkingdom Rhodoplantae	Phylum Rhodophyta Wettstein	Class Florideophyceae Cronquist Subclass Ahnfeltiophycidae	Phylum Rhodophyta Wettstein	Subphylum Rhodophytina subphylum novus	Class Florideophyceae Cronquist	Ahnfeltiales, Pihiellales	Yes	Yes	Ahnfeltia
Subkingdom Rhodoplantae		Class Florideophyceae Cronquist Subclass Rhodymeniophycidae	Phylum Rhodophyta Wettstein	Subphylum Rhodophytina subphylum novus	Class Florideophyceae Cronquist	Bonnemaisoniales, Gigartinales, Gelidiales, Gracilariales, Halymeniales, Rhodymeniales, Nemastomatales, Plocamiales, Ceramiales	Yes	Yes	Gelidium

Some sources (such as Lee) place all red algae into the class "Rhodophyceae". (Lee's organization is not a comprehensive classification, but a selection of orders considered common or important.)

A subphylum – Proteorhodophytina – has been proposed to encompass the existing classes Compsopogonophyceae, Porphyridiophyceae, Rhodellophyceae and Stylonematophyceae. This proposal was made on the basis of the analysis of the plastid genomes.

=== Species ===
Over 7,000 species are currently described for the red algae, but the taxonomy is in constant flux with new species described each year. The vast majority of these are marine with about 200 that live only in fresh water.

Some examples of species and genera of red algae are:

- Cyanidioschyzon merolae, a primitive red alga
- Atractophora hypnoides
- Gelidiella calcicola
- Lemanea, a freshwater genus
- Palmaria palmata, dulse
- Schmitzia hiscockiana
- Chondrus crispus, Irish moss
- Mastocarpus stellatus
- Vanvoorstia bennettiana, became extinct in the early 20th century
- Acrochaetium efflorescens
- Audouinella, with freshwater as well as marine species
- Polysiphonia ceramiaeformis, banded siphon weed
- Vertebrata simulans

=== Phylogeny ===
While Cyanidiophyceae is universally agreed to be the most basal, the remaining 6 classes in the subphylum Rhodophytina have uncertain relationships. The below cladogram follows the results of a 2016 study concerning diversification times among red algae. Number of known extant species in parentheses.

- Rhodophyta
  - Cyanidiophyceae (11)
  - Rhodophytina
    - - Porphyridiophyceae (9)
      - - Compsopogonophyceae (70)
        - Stylonematophyceae (48)
    - - Rhodellophyceae (8)
      - - Bangiophyceae (183)
        - Florideophyceae (6879)

== Evolution ==
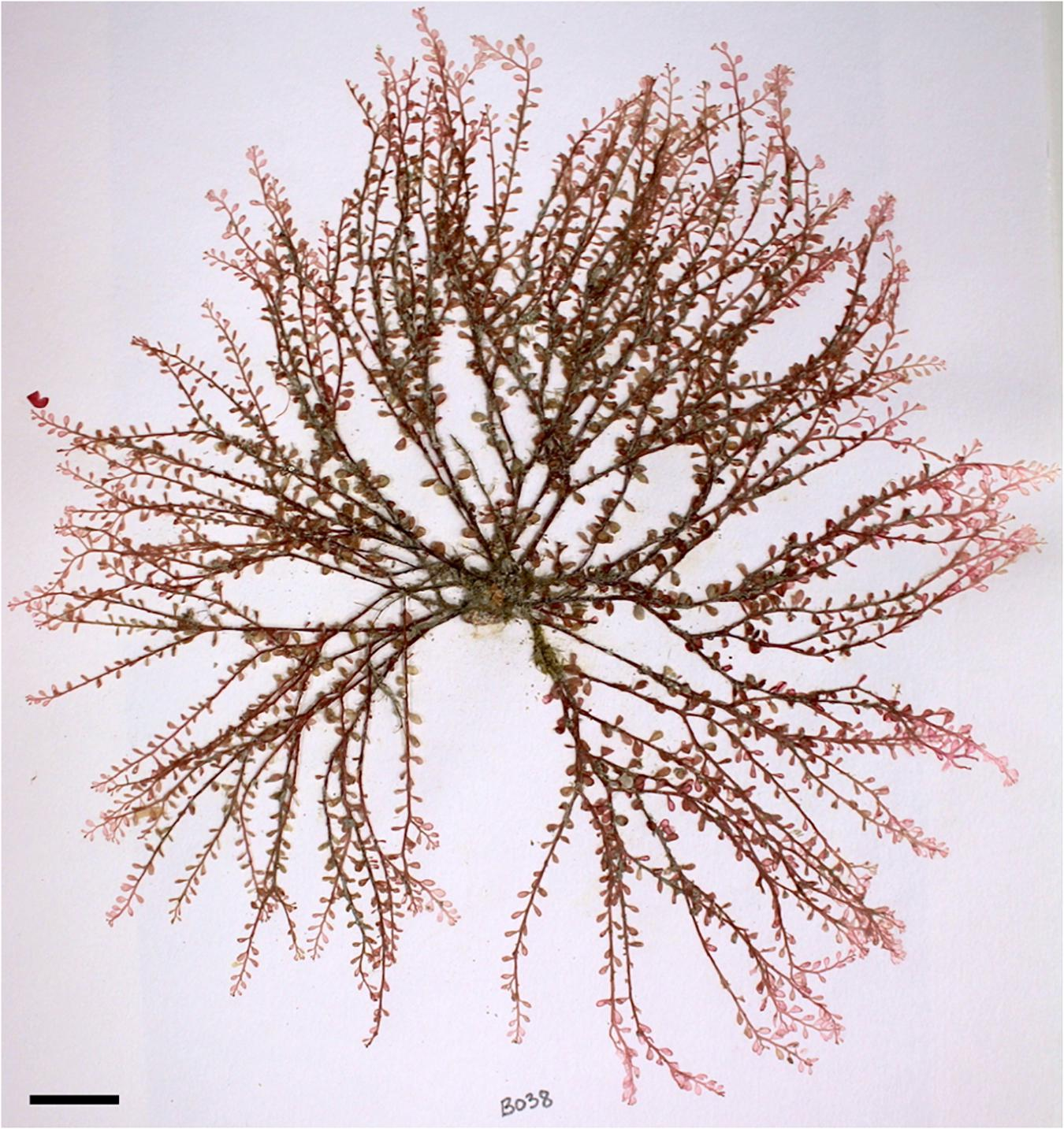
Botryocladia occidentalis (scale bar: 2 centimetres or 3/4 inch)

Red algal chloroplasts originated from an endosymbiotic event between an ancestral photosynthetic cyanobacterium and an early eukaryotic phagotroph. This event, termed primary endosymbiosis, is the origin of both the red and green algae (including the land plants, or embryophytes) and the glaucophytes. Together, these groups comprise the oldest evolutionary lineages of photosynthetic eukaryotes, known as the Archaeplastida.

Through secondary endosymbiosis events, red algal chloroplasts—along with numerous genes from both the red algal nucleus and chloroplast genome—were transferred to four distinct eukaryotic lineages: cryptophytes, haptophytes, ochrophytes, and myzozoans. As a result, it is estimated that—in addition to multicellular brown algae—more than half of all known microbial eukaryotic species harbor plastids derived from red algae. The nuclear genomes of euglenids and chlorarachniophytes also contain a significant number of genes of red algal origin, even though their plastids by contrast are derived from green algae.

Rhodophytes are divided into the Cyanidiophyceae, a class of unicellular and thermoacidophilic extremophiles found in sulphuric hot springs and other acidic environments, an adaptation partly made possible by horizontal gene transfers from prokaryotes, with about 1% of their genome having this origin, and two sister clades called SCRP (Stylonematophyceae, Compsopogonophyceae, Rhodellophyceae and Porphyridiophyceae) and BF (Bangiophyceae and Florideophyceae), which are found in both marine and freshwater environments. The BF are macroalgae, seaweed that usually do not grow to more than about 50 cm in length, but a few species can reach lengths of 2 metres (6 1/2 ft). In the SCRP clade the class Compsopogonophyceae is multicellular, with forms varying from microscopic filaments to macroalgae. Stylonematophyceae have both unicellular and small simple filamentous species, while Rhodellophyceae and Porphyridiophyceae are exclusively unicellular.

Most red algae are marine with a worldwide distribution, and are often found at greater depths compared to other seaweeds. While this was formerly attributed to the presence of pigments (such as phycoerythrin) that would permit red algae to inhabit greater depths than other macroalgae by chromatic adaption, recent evidence calls this into question (e.g. the discovery of green algae at great depth in the Bahamas). Some marine species are found on sandy shores, while most others can be found attached to rocky substrata. Freshwater species account for 5% of red algal diversity, but they also have a worldwide distribution in various habitats; they generally prefer clean, high-flow streams with clear waters and rocky bottoms, but with some exceptions. A few freshwater species are found in black waters with sandy bottoms and even fewer are found in more lentic waters. Both marine and freshwater taxa are represented by free-living macroalgal forms and smaller endo/epiphytic/zoic forms, meaning they live in or on other algae, plants, and animals. In addition, some marine species have adopted a parasitic lifestyle and may be found on closely or more distantly related red algal hosts.

== Genomes and transcriptomes ==
As enlisted in realDB, 27 complete transcriptomes and 10 complete genomes sequences of red algae are available. Listed below are the 10 complete genomes of red algae.

- Cyanidioschyzon merolae, Cyanidiophyceae
- Galdieria sulphuraria, Cyanidiophyceae
- Pyropia yezoensis, Bangiophyceae
- Chondrus crispus, Florideophyceae
- Porphyridium purpureum, Porphyridiophyceae
- Porphyra umbilicalis, Bangiophyceae
- Gracilaria changii, Gracilariales
- Galdieria phlegrea, Cyanidiophytina
- Gracilariopsis lemaneiformis, Gracilariales
- Gracilariopsis chorda, Gracilariales

== Fossil record ==
One of the oldest fossils identified as a red alga is also the oldest fossil eukaryote that belongs to a specific modern taxon. Bangiomorpha pubescens, a multicellular fossil from arctic Canada, strongly resembles the modern red alga Bangia and occurs in rocks dating to 1.05 billion years ago.

Two kinds of fossils resembling red algae were found sometime between 2006 and 2011 in well-preserved sedimentary rocks in Chitrakoot, central India. The presumed red algae lie embedded in fossil mats of cyanobacteria, called stromatolites, in 1.6 billion-year-old Indian phosphorite – making them the oldest plant-like fossils ever found by about 400 million years.

Red algae are important builders of limestone reefs. The earliest such coralline algae, the solenopores, are known from the Cambrian period. Other algae of different origins filled a similar role in the late Paleozoic, and in more recent reefs.

Calcite crusts that have been interpreted as the remains of coralline red algae, date to the Ediacaran Period. Thallophytes resembling coralline red algae are known from the late Proterozoic Doushantuo formation.

== Uses ==
=== Human consumption ===
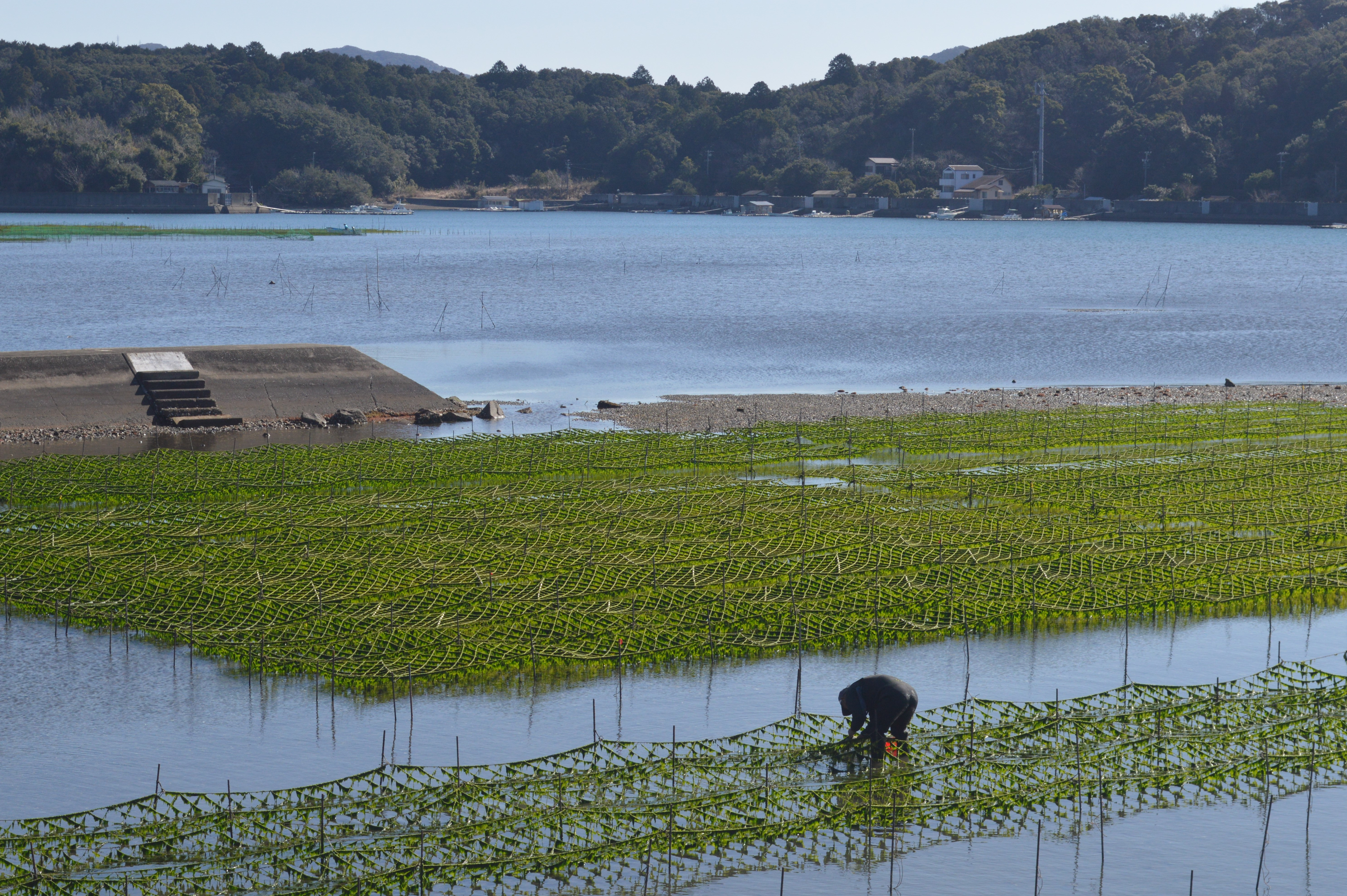
Cultivation of algae to use as nori, in Gokasho Bay, Japan.

Red algae have a long history of use as a source of nutritional, functional food ingredients and pharmaceutical substances. They are a source of antioxidants including polyphenols, and phycobiliproteins and contain proteins, minerals, trace elements, vitamins and essential fatty acids.

Traditionally, red algae are eaten raw, in salads, soups, meal and condiments. Several species are food crops, in particular dulse (Palmaria palmata) and members of the genus Porphyra, variously known as nori (Japan), gim (Korea), zicai 紫菜 (China), and laver (British Isles).

Red algal species such as Gracilaria and Laurencia are rich in polyunsaturated fatty acids (eicopentaenoic acid, docohexaenoic acid, arachidonic acid) and have protein content up to 47% of total biomass. Where a big portion of world population is getting insufficient daily iodine intake, a 150 ug/day requirement of iodine is obtained from a single gram of red algae. Red algae, like Gracilaria, Gelidium, Euchema, Porphyra, Acanthophora, and Palmaria are primarily known for their industrial use for phycocolloids (agar, algin, furcellaran and carrageenan) as thickening agent, textiles, food, anticoagulants, water-binding agents, etc. Dulse (Palmaria palmata) is one of the most consumed red algae and is a source of iodine, protein, magnesium and calcium. Red algae's nutritional value is used for the dietary supplement of algas calcareas.

China, Japan, Republic of Korea are the top producers of seaweeds. In East and Southeast Asia, agar is most commonly produced from Gelidium amansii. These rhodophytes are easily grown and, for example, nori cultivation in Japan goes back more than three centuries.

=== Animal feed ===
Researchers in Australia discovered that limu kohu (Asparagopsis taxiformis) can reduce methane emissions in cattle. In one Hawaii experiment, the reduction reached 77%. The World Bank predicted the industry could be worth ~$1.1 billion by 2030. As of 2024, preparation included three stages of cultivation and drying. Australia's first commercial harvest was in 2022. Agriculture accounts for 37% of the world's anthropogenic methane emissions. One cow produces between 154 and 264 pounds of methane/yr.

=== Other ===
Other algae-based markets include construction materials, fertilizers and other agricultural inputs, bioplastics, biofuels and fabric. Red algae also provides ecosystem services such as filtering water and carbon sequestration.

== Gallery ==
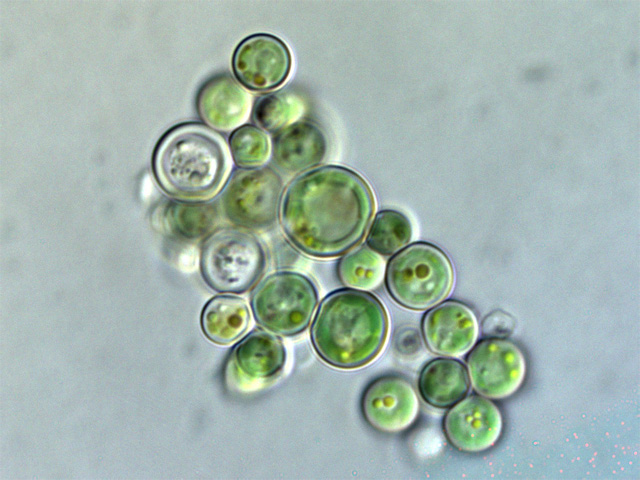
Cyanidium sp. (Cyanidiophyceae)

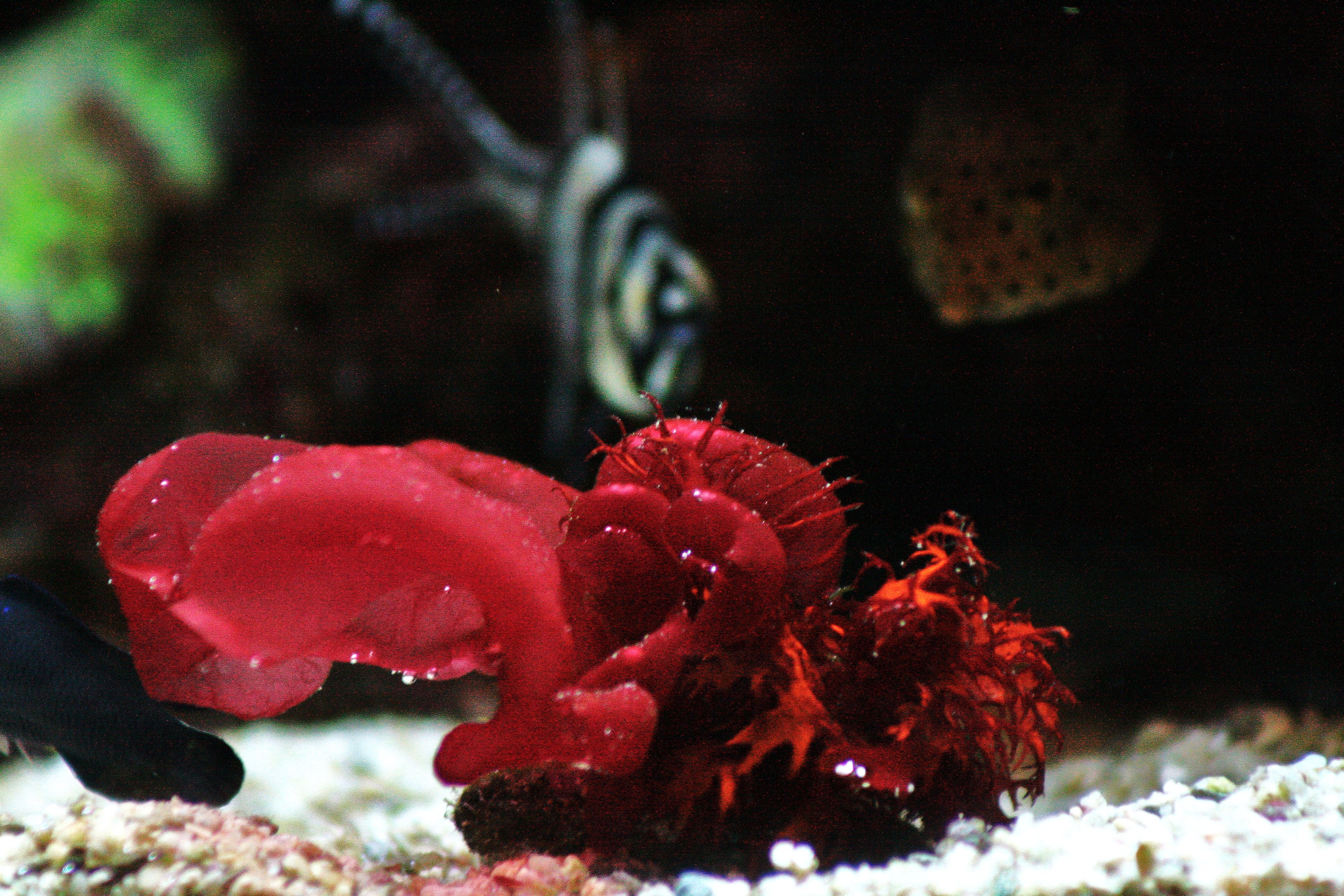
Porphyra sp., haploid and diploid (Bangiophyceae)

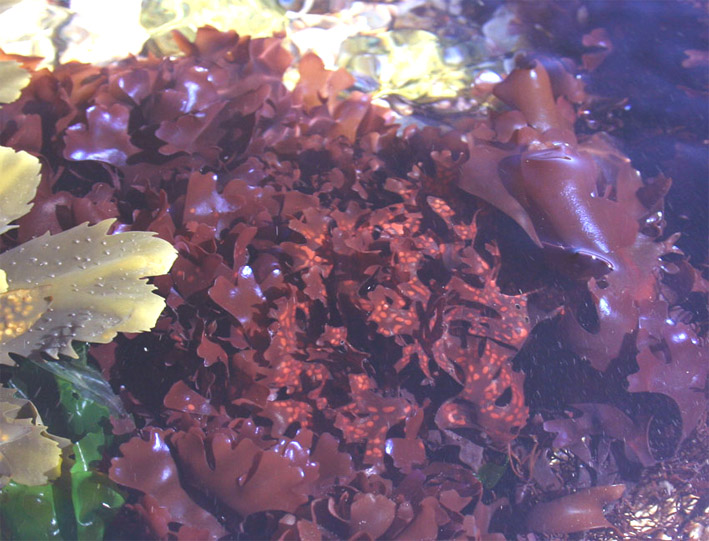
Chondrus crispus (Florideophyceae: Gigartinales)

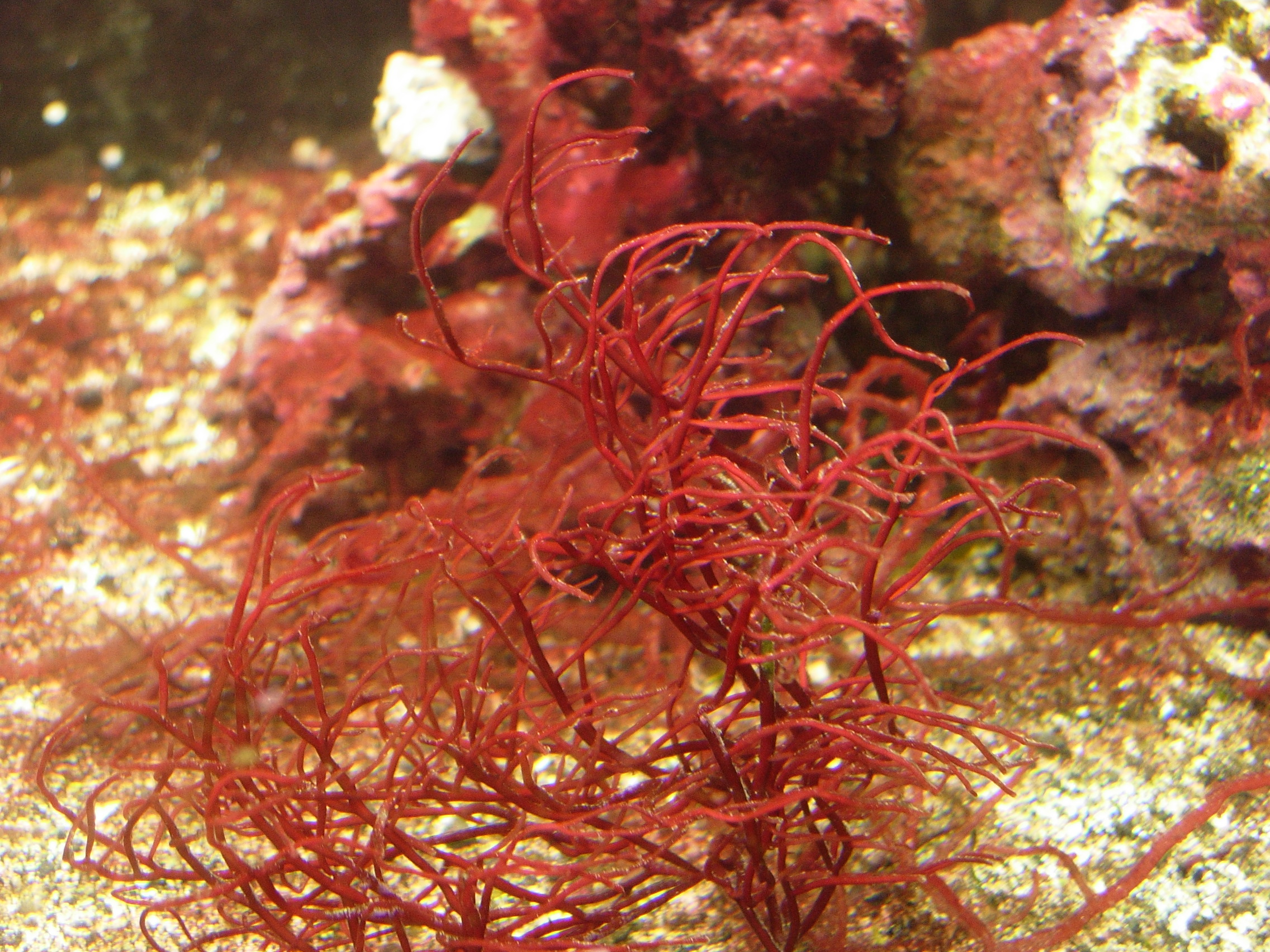
Gracilaria sp. (Florideophyceae: Gracilariales)

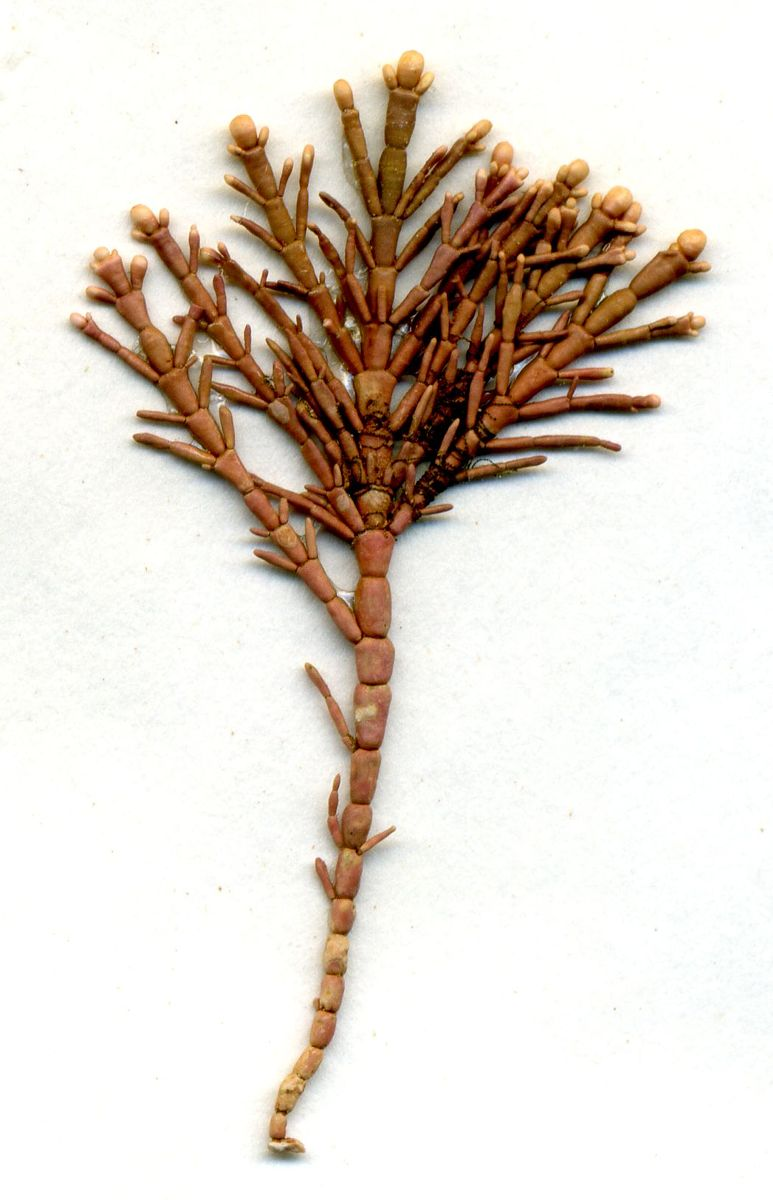
Corallina officinalis sp. (Florideophyceae: Corallinales)

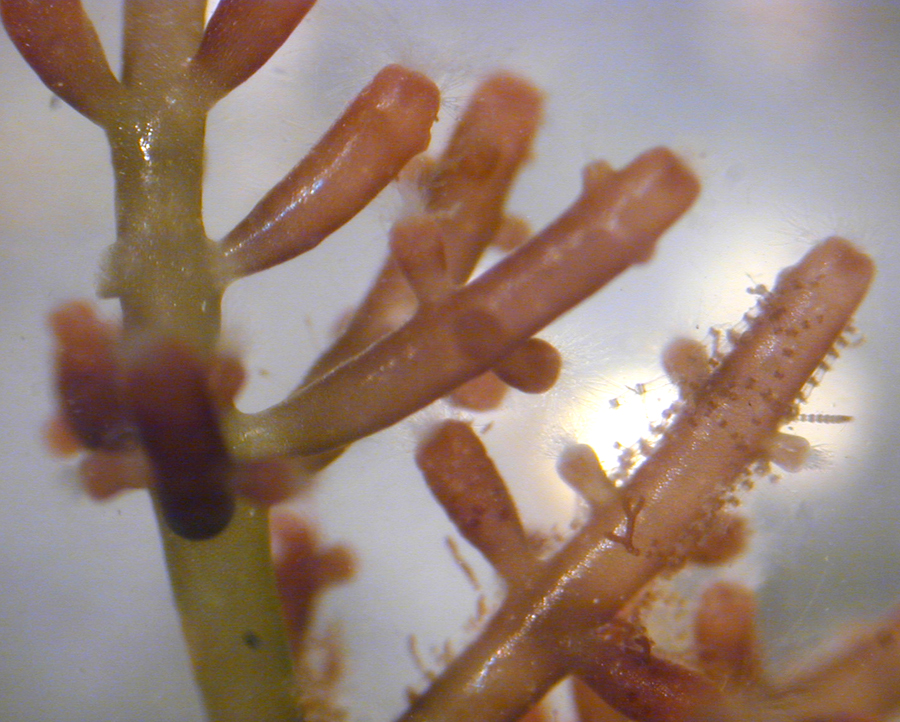
Laurencia sp. (Florideophyceae: Ceramiales)

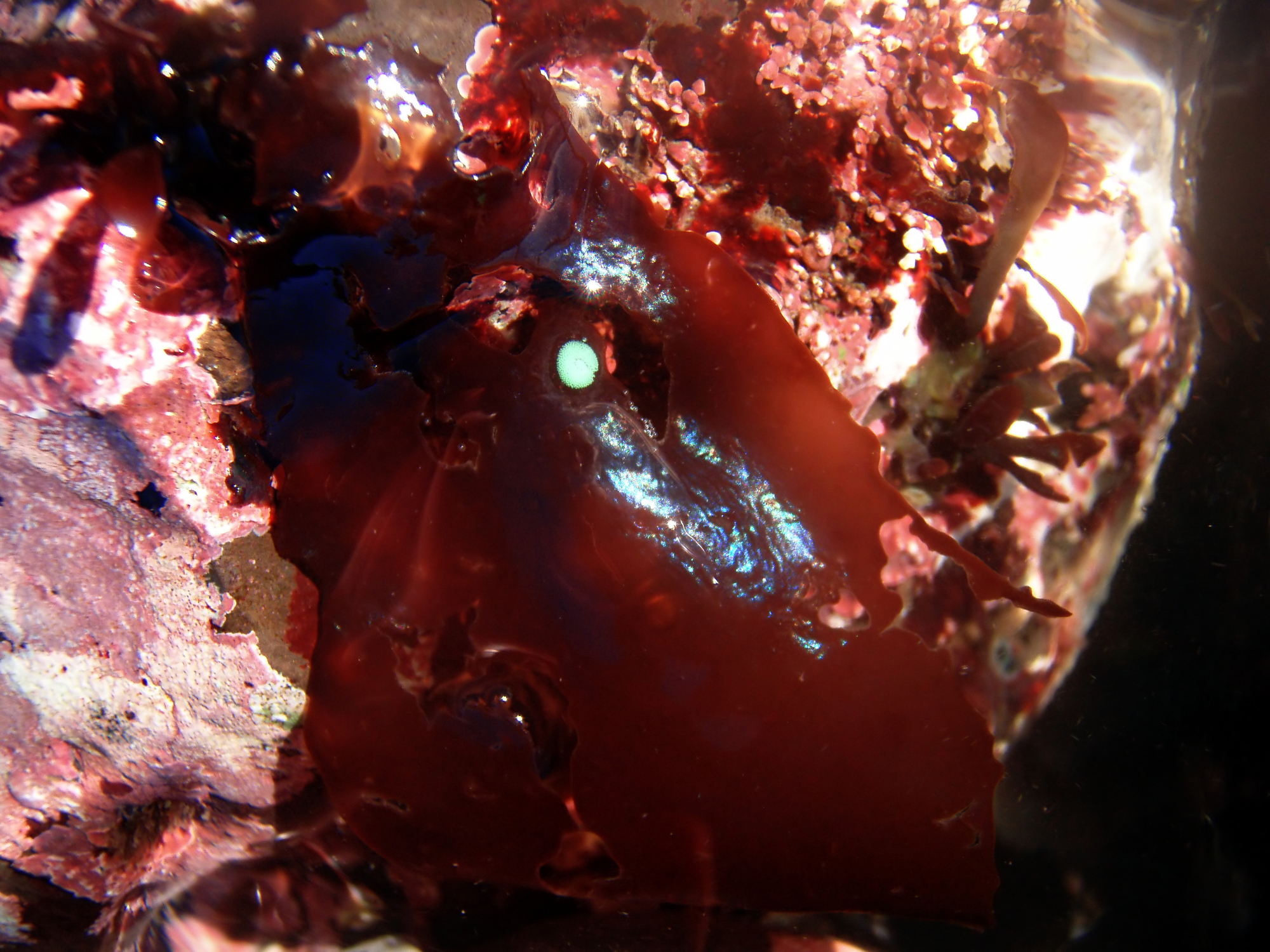
Some red algae are iridescent when not covered with water

== See also ==
- Brown algae
- Green algae
- History of phycology
- Litostroma – Extinct genus of algae
