= List of red seaweeds of the Cape Peninsula and False Bay =

Regional biodiversity species list

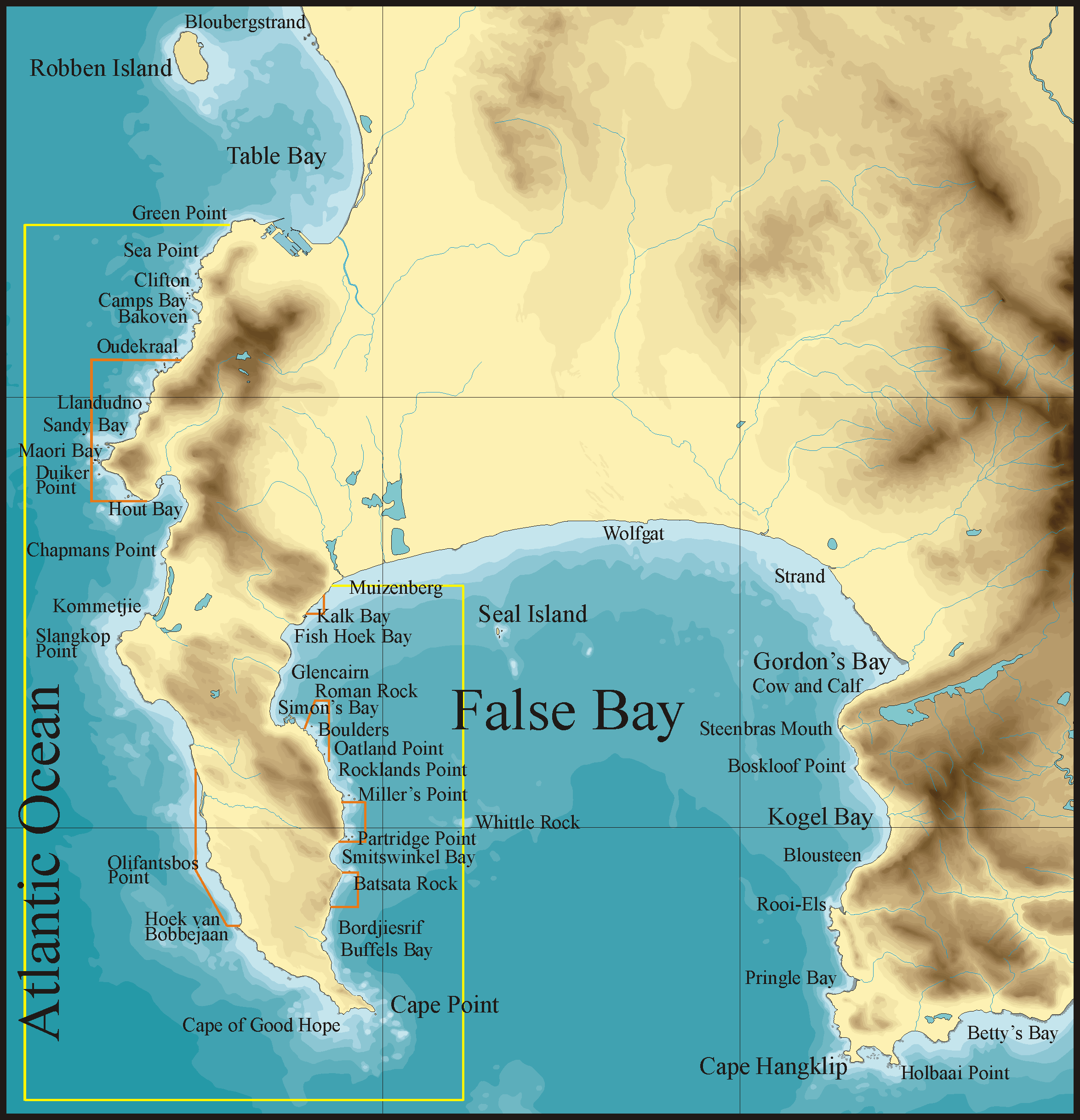
Map of the Cape Peninsula and False Bay coastline showing some of the landmarks referred to in species range statements. Melkbosstrand is a few kilometers north of the displayed area on the west coast. Cape Hangklip is shown on the map to the south east.

Marine ecoregions of the South African exclusive economic zone

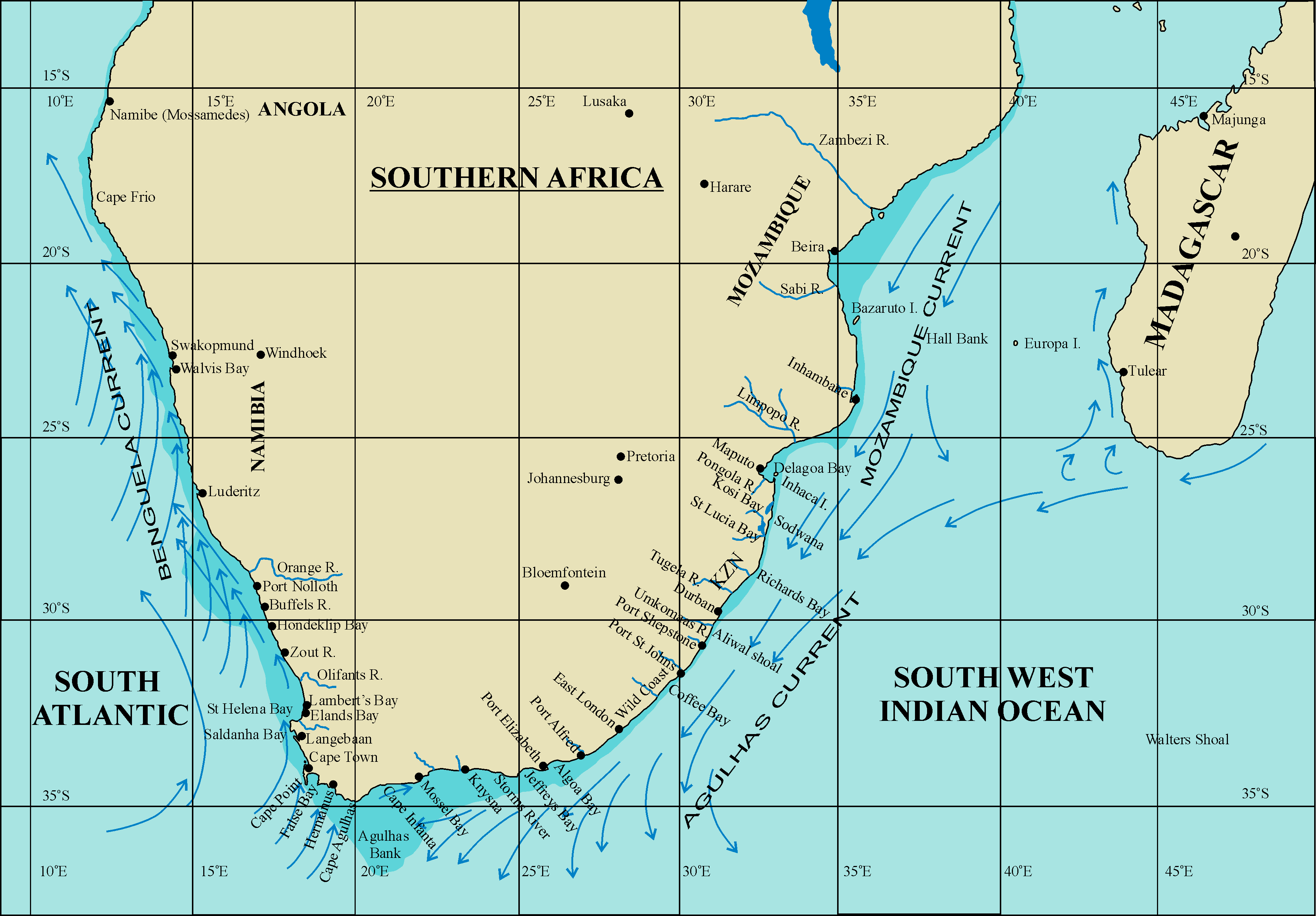
Map of the Southern African coastline showing some of the landmarks referred to in species range statements.

This is a list of red seaweeds recorded from the oceans bordering The Cape Peninsula in South Africa from Melkbosstrand on the West Coast to Cape Hangklip on the South Coast. This list comprises locally used common names, scientific names with author citation and recorded ranges. Ranges specified may not be the entire known range for the species, but should include the known range within the waters surrounding the Republic of South Africa.

Red seaweed refers to thousands of species of macroscopic, multicellular, marine algae in the taxon Rhodophyta

The marine ecology is unusually varied for an area of this size, as a result of the meeting of two major oceanic water masses near Cape Point, and the park extends into two coastal marine bioregions. The ecology of the west or "Atlantic Seaboard" side of the Cape Peninsula is noticeably different in character and biodiversity to that of the east, or "False Bay" side. Both sides are classified as temperate waters, but there is a significant difference in average temperature, with the Atlantic side being noticeably colder on average.

List ordering and taxonomy complies where possible with the current usage in Algaebase, and may differ from the cited source, as listed citations are primarily for range or existence of records for the region. Sub-taxa within any given taxon are arranged alphabetically as a general rule. Details of each species may be available through the relevant internal links. Synonyms may be listed where useful.

== Class: Bangiophyceae ==
=== Order: Bangiales ===
==== Family Bangiaceae ====
- Bangia atropurpurea (Mertens ex Roth) C.Agardh 1824, syn. Conferva atropurpurea Mertens ex Roth 1806, Oscillatoria atropurpurea (Roth) C.Agardh 1817, Bangia fuscopurpurea var. atropurpurea (Roth) Lyngbye 1819, Bangia atropurpurea (Mertens ex Roth) C.Agardh 1824, Bangiella atropurpurea (Roth) Gaillon 1833, Bangiadulcis atropurpurea (Roth) W.A.Nelson 2007, (Cosmopolitan)
- Purple laver, Porphyra capensis Kützing 1843, (Abundant on whole of west coast extending into Namibia and along south coast of Western and Eastern Cape. Endemic)
- Pyropia gardneri (G.M.Smith & Hollenberg) S.C.Lindstrom in Sutherland et al. 2011, syn. Porphyrella gardneri G.M.Smith & Hollenberg 1943, Porphyra gardneri (G.M.Smith & Hollenberg) M.W.Hawkes 1977, (Cape of Good Hope to Brandfontein)
- Pyropia saldanhae (Stegenga, J.J.Bolton & R.J.Anderson) J.E.Sutherland in Sutherland et al. 2011, syn. Porphyra saldanhae Stegenga, Bolton & R.J.Anderson 1997, (Hondeklip Bay and Olifantsbos, endemic)

=== Order: Porphyridiales ===
==== Family Phragmonemataceae ====
- Neevea cf. repens Batters 1900, (Hout Bay)

== Class: Compsopogonophyceae ==
=== Order: Erythropeltidales ===
==== Family Erythrotrichiaceae ====
- Erythrocladia cf. polystromatica P.J.L.Dangeard 1932, (St James, False Bay and Cape Hangklip)
- Erythrotrichia carnea (Dillwyn) J.Agardh 1883, syn. Erythrocladia carnea, Conferva carnea Dillwyn 1807, Bangia ciliaris subsp. pulchella (Harvey) De Toni 1897, (Probably fairly common, but South African distribution uncertain)
- Erythrotrichia welwitschii (Ruprecht) Batters 1902, syn. Cruoria welwitschii Ruprecht 1850, (Cape of Good Hope and False Bay extending eastwards at least as far as Port Elizabeth)
- Membranella africana Stegenga, Bolton & Anderson 1997, (Cape of Good Hope at least as far as Port Alfred)
- Porphyrostromium boryanum (Montagne) P.C.Silva in Silva, Basson & Moe 1996, Porphyra boryana Montagne 1846, Erythrotrichia boryana (Montagne) Berthold 1882, Phyllona boryana (Montagne) Kuntze 1891, Erythrotrichopeltis boryana (Montagne) Kornmann 1984, Porphyrostromium boryanum (Montagne) M.J.Wynne 1986, (Yzerfontein to Oatlands Point, False Bay)
- Sahlingia subintegra (Rosenvinge, 1909) Kornmann 1989, syn. Erythrocladia subintegra Rosenvinge 1909, Erythrocladia irregularis f. subintegra (Rosenvinge) Garbary, Hansen & Scagel 1981. Erythropeltis subintegra (Rosenvinge) Kornmann & Sahling 1985, Erythrotrichopeltis subintegra (Rosenvinge) Kornmann & Sahling 1985, (Worldwide – probably widely distributed in SA )

== Class: Florideophyceae ==
=== Order: Acrochaetiales ===
==== Family Acrochaetiaceae ====
- Acrochaetium brebneri (Batters) G.Hamel 1928, syn. Rhodochorton brebneri Batters 1897, Chantransia brebneri (Batters) Rosenvinge 1909, Audouinella brebneri (Batters) P.S.Dixon 1976, (False Bay side of the Cape Peninsula)
- Acrochaetium balliae (Stegenga), nom. illeg. syn. Audouinella balliae Stegenga 1985, (Port Nolloth to Hout Bay)
- Acrochaetium catenulatum M.A.Howe 1914, (Namibia to Eastern Cape)
- Acrochaetium endozoicum (Darbishire) Batters 1902, syn. Chantransia endozoica Darbishire 1899, Rhodochorton endozoicum (Darbishire) Drew 1928, Audouinella endozoica (Darbishire) P.S.Dixon 1976, (Cape Peninsula)
- Acrochaetium moniliforme (Rosenvinge) Børgesen 1915, Chantransia moniliformis Rosenvinge 1909, Rhodochorton moniliforme (Rosenvinge) Drew 1928, Kylinia moniliformis (Rosenvinge) Kylin 1944, Chromastrum moniliforme (Rosenvinge) Papenfuss 1945, Audouinella moniliformis (Rosenvinge) Garbary 1979, (False Bay eastward at least as far as Transkei)
- Acrochaetium plumosum (K.M.Drew) G.M.Smith 1944, syn. Colaconema plumosum (Drew) Woelkerling 1971, Rhodochorton Plumosum Drew 1928, (Hondeklip Bay to Betty's Bay)
- Acrochaetium reductum (Rosenvinge) G.Hamel 1927, syn. Chantransia reducta Rosenvinge 1909, (Between False Bay and Plettenberg Bay)
- Acrochaetium secundatum (Lyngbye) Nägeli 1858, syn. Callithamnion daviesii var. secundatum Lyngbye 1819, (Namibia to False Bay)
- Audouinella occulta H.Stegenga 1985, (Hout Bay)
- Audouinella monorhiza (Stegenga) Garbary 1987, syn. Colaconema monorhiza Stegenga 1985, (Noordhoek and Olifantsbos, Cape Peninsula)
- Audouinella pectinata (Kylin) Papenfuss 1945, syn. Chantransia pectinata Kylin, 1906, (Doring Bay to Olifantsbos)
- Audouinella spongicola (Weber-van Bosse) Stegenga 1985, syn. Acrochaetium spongicola Weber-van Bosse 1921, (Hout Bay to Bird Island, Eastern Province)

=== Order Balliales ===
==== Family Balliaceae ====
- Ballia callitricha (C.Agardh) Kützing 1843, syn. Sphacelaria callitricha C.Agardh 1824, (West side of Cape Peninsula to Cape Agulhas)
- Ballia sertularioides (Suhr) Papenfuss 1940, syn. Callithamnion sertularioides Suhr 1840, (Lüderitz in Namibia to Hout Bay, Southern African endemic)

=== Order Bonnemaisoniales ===
==== Family Bonnemaisoniaceae ====
- Asparagopsis armata Harvey 1855syn. Falkenbergia rufolanosa (Harvey) F.Schmitz in Engler & Prantl 1897, (Platbank, Cape Peninsula eastwards)
- Bonnemaisonia hamifera Hariot 1891, (Known from one collection at Strandfontein, False Bay)
- Delisea flaccida (Suhr) Papenfuss 1940, syn. Sphaerococcus flaccidus Suhr 1834, (Olifantsbos on the Cape Peninsula eastwards)

=== Order Ceramiales ===
==== Family Callithamniaceae ====
- Aglaothamnion hookeri (Dillwyn) Maggs & Hommersand 1993, syn. Conferva hookeri Dillwyn 1809, Callithamnion hookeri (Dillwyn) S.F.Gray 1821, (Namibia to East London)
- Callithamnion stuposum Suhr 1840, syn. Phlebothamnion stuposum (Suhr) Kützing 1843, Spongoclonium stuposum (Suhr) De Toni 1903, (Swartklip to KwaZulu-Natal)
- Callithamnion sp. indet. (Cape Peninsula to East London)
- Heteroptilon pappeanum (Kützing) Hommersand in Hommersand, D.W. Freshwater, J. López-Bautista, & S. Fredericq 2006, syn. Euptilota pappeana Kützing 1849, (Hondeklipbaai to Cape Agulhas, endemic)

==== Family Ceramiaceae ====
- Antithamnion diminuatum var. polyglandulum Stegenga 1986, (Olifantsbos in the southern Cape Peninsula eastward to KwaZulu-Natal)
- Antithamnion pseudoarmatum Stegenga 1986, (Olifantsbos and Brandfontein, endemic)
- Antithamnionella tasmanica Wollaston 1968, (Kalk Bay to Kowie River)
- Antithamnionella tormentosa Stegenga 1986, (Cape Peninsula from Three Anchor Bay to Muizenberg, endemic)
- Antithamnionella verticillata (Suhr) Lyle 1922, syn. Callithamnion vertillatum Suhr 1840, Antithamnion verticillatum (Suhr) De Toni 1903, (Swartklip in False Bay to Transkei)
- Bornetia repens Stegenga 1985, (Swartklip in False Bay to Transkei, possibly KwaZulu-Natal)
- Callithamniella capensis Simons 1970, (Muizenberg to East London, endemic)
- Callithamnion stuposum Suhr 1840, syn. Phlebothamnion stuposum (Suhr) Kützing 1843, Spongoclonium stuposum (Suhr) De Toni 1903, (Rare on weat coast, common on south coast and KwaZulu-Natal at least as far north as Mabibi)
- Flaccid kelp-weed, Carpoblepharis flaccida (J.V.Lamouroux) Kützing 1849, syn. Ptilota flaccida (J.V.Lamouroux) C.Agardh 1822, Delesseria flaccida J.V.Lamouroux 1813, (Namibia to the Kei river, Southern African endemic)
- Carpoblepharis minima E.S.Barton 1893, (Möwe Bay in Namibia to Buffels Bay on the Cape Peninsula)
- Centroceras clavulatum (C.Agardh) Montagne 1846, syn. Ceramium clavulatum C.Agardh 1822, Spyridia clavulata (C.Agardh) J.Agardh 1842, (Whole southern African coast)
- Centroceras distichum Okamura 1934, (Cape Hangklip)
- Curl-claw, Centroceras spp.
- Beaded ceramium, Ceramium arenarium Simons 1966, (Swakopmund in Namibia to East London, Southern African endemic)
- Black-red ceramium, Ceramium atrorubescens Kylin, 1938.
- Ceramium aff. callipterum Mazoyer 1938, (West side of southern Cape Peninsula)
- Ceramium camouii E.Y.Dawson 1944, (Cape Point eastwards along south coast)
- Cape ceramium, Ceramium capense Kützing 1841, (Lüderitz to Kommetjie, endemic)
- Ceramium centroceratiforme Simons 1966, (Cape Hangklip to Kei River, endemic)
- Ceramium dawsonii A.B.Joly 1957, (False Bay eastward along entire Cape south coast)
- Ceramium glanduliferum Kylin 1938, (Sea Point on Cape Peninsula eastward into KwaZulu-Natal, Southern African endemic)
- Coarse ceramium, Ceramium obsoletum C.Agardh 1828, (From Namibia south and eastwards along the whole Cape South coast, Southern African endemic)
- Ceramium papenfussianum Simons 1966, (Primarily a West Coast species, endemic)
- Flat-fern ceramium, Ceramium planum Kützing 1849, (Swakopmund in Namibia to False Bay. Southern African endemic)
- Ceramium tenerrimum (G.Martens) Okamura 1921, syn. Hormoceras tenerrimum G.Martens 1866, (Whole of Cape west coast and east to Knysna)
- Compsothamnionella sciadophila Stegenga 1990, (Found once at Muizenberg, endemic)
- Crouania attenuata (C.Agardh) J.Agardh 1842, syn. Mesogloia attenuata C.Agardh 1824, (Kalk Bay eastward into tropical East Africa)
- Crouania francescoi Cormaci, G.Furnari & Scammacca 1978, (False Bay eastwards to northern KwaZulu-Natal)
- Laurenciophila minima Stegenga 1986, (Clovelly in False Bay to Kowie river, endemic)
- Microcladia gloria-spei Stegenga 1986, (Port Nolloth to Southern Cape Peninsula),
- Platythamnion capense Stegenga 1986, (Only known from Platboombaai, endemic)
- Pterothamnion recurvatum (Wollaston) Athanasiadis & Kraft 1994, syn. Platythamnion recurvatum E.M.Wollaston 1972, (Paternoster to Olifantsbos, Port Alfred)

==== Family Callithamniaceae ====
- Aristocratic plume-weed, Callithamnion collabens (Rudolphi) L.McIvor & Maggs 2002, syn. Asperocaulon collabens Rudolphi 1831, Aristothamnion collabens (Rudolphi) Papenfuss 1968, (Namibia to Port Alfred, Southern African endemic)
- Iridescent plume-weed, Callithamnion stuposum Suhr, 1840

==== Family Dasyaceae ====
- Dasya echinata Stegenga, Bolton & R.J.Anderson 1997, (Brandfontein, Strandfontein in False Bay, and Waterloo Bay in Eastern Cape, endemic)
- Bottlebrush, Dasya scoparia Harvey in J. Agardh 1841, (Lambert's Bay to East London), (Lamberts Bay to Mabibi in northern KwaZulu-Natal)
- Heterosiphonia arenaria Kylin 1938, (Swartklip. Brandfontein, and Port Elizabeth to East London, endemic)
- Heterosiphonia crispa (Suhr) Falkenberg 1901, syn. Dasya crispa Suhr 1840, (Lamberts Bay to KwaZulu-Natal, endemic)
- Heterosiphonia dubia (Suhr) Falkenberg 1901, syn. Dasya dubia Suhr 1840, (Paternoster to KwaZulu-Natal, Southern African endemic)
- Heterosiphonia pellucida (Harvey) Falkenberg 1901, syn. Dasya pellucida Harvey 1849, (Lamberts Bay to Brandfontein, endemic)

==== Family Delesseriaceae ====
- Acrosorium acrospermum (J.Agardh) Kylin 1938, Plain acrosorium, syn. Nitophyllum ascospermum J.Agardh 1852, (False Bay to Eastern Cape, endemic)
- Acrosorium maculatum (Sonder ex Kützing) Papenfuss 1940, syn. Aglaophyllum maculatum Sonder ex Kützing 1866, Nitophyllum uncinatum var. maculatum (Sonder ex Kützing) De Toni 1900, (Southern Cape Peninsula to KwaZulu-Natal)
- Acrosorium ciliolatum (Harvey) Kylin 1924, crled acrosorium, syn. Nitophyllum ciliolatum Harvey 1855, Aglaophyllum ciliolatum (Harvey) Kützing 1869, Nitophyllum venulosum Zanardini 1866, Acrosorium venulosum (Zanardini) Kylin 1924, (as A. venulosum, Kommetjie to KwaZulu-Natal) (as A. ciliatum, Kommetjie eastward extending into KwaZulu-Natal at least as far as Sodwana Bay)
- Apoglossum ruscifolium (Turner) J.Agardh 1898, syn. Fucus ruscifolius Turner 1802, Delesseria ruscifolia (Turner) J.V.Lamouroux 1813, (Oudekraal to Brandfontein)
- Bartoniella crenata (J.Agardh ex Mazza) Kylin 1924, syn. Phitymophora crenata J.Agardh ex Mazza 1908, (Muizenberg and Cape Hangklip at least as far as Mission Rocks, endemic)
- Black spot, Botryocarpa prolifera Greville 1830, (Namibia to southern Cape Peninsula)
- Botryoglossum, Botryoglossum platycarpum (Turner) Kützing 1843, syn. Fucus platycarpus Turner 1809, Delesseria platycarpa (Turner) J.V.Lamouroux 1813, Phyllophora platycarpa (Turner) Greville ex Krauss 1846, Nitophyllum platycarpum (Turner) J.Agardh 1876, (Namibia to Cape of Good Hope. Southern African endemic)
- Erythroglossum sp. indet. (Glencairn to Hluleka, endemic)
- Gonimophyllum africanum M.T.Martin & M.A.Pocock 1953, (Table Bay to Kei River)
- Haraldiophyllum bonnemaisonii (Kylin) A.D.Zinova 1981, syn. Myriogramme bonnemaisonii Kylin 1924, Nitophyllum bonnemaisonii (Kylin) Kylin 1934, (Kommetjie to Muizenberg on the Cape Peninsula)
- Veined oil-weed, Hymenena venosa (Linnaeus) Krauss 1846, syn. Fucus venosus Linnaeus 1771, Delesseria venosa (Turner) J.V.Lamouroux 1813, (Namibia to southern Cape Peninsula)
- Martensia elegans Hering 1841, syn. Capraella elegans (Harvey) J.De Toni 1936, Mesotrema elegans (Hering) Papenfuss 1942, (Common south coast species, extending into KwaZulu-Natal at least as far as Sodwana Bay)
- Myriogramme eckloniae Stegenga, Bolton & R.J.Anderson 1997, (Drift material at Muizenberg, endemic)
- Myriogramme livida (J.D.Hooker & Harvey) Kylin 1924, syn. Nitophyllum lividum J.D.Hooker & Harvey 1845, Cryptopleura livida (J.D.Hooker & Harvey) Kützing 1868, (Swakopmund to Kommetjie)
- Veined tongues, Neuroglossum binderianum Kützing 1843, (Namibia to southern Cape Peninsula)
- Papenfussia laciniata (Harvey) M.D. Guiry 2005?, syn. Pollexfenia laciniata Harvey 1844, (Both sides of the Cape Peninsula, endemic)
- Frilly broekies, Paraglossum papenfussii (M.J.Wynne) S.-M.Lin, Fredericq & Hommersand, 2012, also recorded as syn. Delesseria papenfussii M.J.Wynne 1984, (Port Nolloth to Brandfontein. Southern African endemic)
- Platyclinia sp. (Olifantsbos)
- Platysiphonia intermedia (Grunow) M.J.Wynne 1983, syn. Sarcomenia intermedia Grunow 1867, (Port Nolloth to Cape Agulhas)
- Delesseriaceae vel. aff. (Oudekraal, endemic)

==== Family Rhodomelaceae ====
- Aiolocolax pulchellus M.A.Pocock 1956, (Blaauwberg eastwards)
- Bostrychia intricata (Bory de Saint-Vincent) Montagne 1852, syn. Scytonema intricatum Bory de Saint-Vincent 1828, Stictosiphonia intricata (Bory de Saint-Vincent) P.C.Silva 1996, (Saldanha Bay, Kommetjie on Cape Peninsula eastward along whole of south coast)
- Kelp fern, Carradoriella virgata (C.Agardh) P.C.Silva, 1996, recorded as syn. Polysiphonia virgata (C.Agardh) Sprengel 1827, syn. Hutchinsia virgata C.Agardh 1824, Carradoria virgata (C.Agardh) Kylin 1956, (Namibia to Brandfontein)
- Cape chondria, Chondria capensis (Harvey) Askenasy 1888, syn. Laurencia capensis Harvey 1849, Chondriopsis capensis (Harvey) J.Agardh 1863, (Namibia to just east of Cape Agulhas. Southern African endemic.)
- Falkenbergiella capensis Kylin 1938, (St James, Muizenberg and Swartklip in False Bay. Cape south coast. Endemic)
- Herposiphonia didymosporangia Stegenga & Kemperman 1987, (St James, Brandfontein and coast of De Hoop nature reserve, Southern African endemic)
- Herposiphonia heringii (Harvey) Falkenberg 1901, syn. Polysiphonia heringii Harvey 1847, (Between Hondeklipbaai and St James, endemic)
- Herposiphonia secunda (C.Agardh) Ambronn 1880, syn. Hutchinsia secunda C.Agardh 1824, Polysiphonia secunda (C.Agardh) Zanardini 1840, Herposiphonia tenella f. secunda (C.Agardh) Hollenberg 1968, (Muizenberg, Cape Agulhas eastward to the tropics)
- Flexuose laurencia, Laurencia flexuosa Kützing 1849, (False Bay to KwaZulu-Natal at least as far north as Mabibi, endemic))
- Grape laurencia, Laurencia glomerata (Kützing) Kützing 1849, syn. Chondria glomerata Kützing 1847, (Port Nolloth?, Melbosstrand?, Cape Peninsula eastward)
- Laurencia peninsularis Stegenga, Bolton & R.J.Anderson 1987, (False Bay to East London, endemic)
- Ophidocladus simpliciusculus (P.L.Crouan & H.M.Crouan) Falkenberg in Schmitz & Falkenberg 1897, syn. Polysiphonia simpliciuscula P.L.Crouan & H.M.Crouan 1852, (Hondeklipbaai?, Platboombaai on Cape Peninsula to Mozambique)
- Pachychaeta cryptoclada Falkenberg 1901, (Swartklip, Brandfontein, more common in Eastern Cape, endemic)
- Placophora binderi (J.Agardh) J.Agardh 1863, syn. Amansia binderi J.Agardh 1841, Micramansia binderi (J.Agardh) Kützing 1865, (Kalk Bay on the Cape Peninsula extending along south and east coast to southern Mozambique)
- Placophora monocarpa (Montagne) Papenfuss 1956, syn. Polysiphonia monocarpa Montagne 1842, (Melkbosstrand to Strandfontein in False Bay, possibly further east, endemic)
- Polysiphonia incompta Harvey 1847, (Namibia, the entire South African coast into Mozambique)
- Polysiphonia namibiensis Stegenga & Engeldow in Stegenga, Bolton & Anderson 1997, (Olifantsbos, Cape Agulhas, Eastern Cape. Southern African endemic)
- Polysiphonia scopulorum Harvey 1855, syn. Vertebrata scopulorum (Harvey) Kuntze 1891, Lophosiphonia scopulorum (Harvey) Womersley 1950, (Muizenberg and Clovelly in False Bay)
- Polysiphonia urbana Harvey 1847, (Port Nolloth to Cape Agulhas. Southern African endemic)
- Polysiphonia sp.1 (Muizenberg, endemic)
- Red feather-weed, Pterosiphonia cloiophylla (C.Agardh) Falkenberg in Schmitz & Falkenberg 1897, syn. Rytiphlaea cloiophylla (C.Agardh) J.Agardh, Rhodomela cloiophylla C.Agardh 1822, Polysiphonia cloiophylla (C.Agardh) J.Agardh 1863, (Namibia, Cape west coast and Cape south coast)
- Pterosiphonia stangeri (J.Agardh) Falkenberg 1901, syn. Polysiphonia stangeri J.Agardh 1863, Vertebrata stangeri (J.Agardh) Kuntze 1891, (Swartklip in False Bay, Cape south coast and KwaZulu-Natal. Southern African endemic)
- Streblocladia camptoclada (Montagne) Falkenberg 1901, syn. Polysiphonia camptoclada Montagne 1837, (Yzerfontein to Clovelly in False Bay)
- Streblocladia corymbifera (C.Agardh) Kylin 1938, syn. Hutchinsia corymbifera C.Agardh 1828, Polysiphonia corymbifera (C.Agardh) Endlicher 1843, (Saldanha to St. James in False Bay)
- Stromatocarpus parasiticus Falkenberg in Schmitz & Falkenberg 1897, (Blaauwberg to Cape Hangklip, endemic)
- Tayloriella tenebrosa (Harvey) Kylin 1938, Polysiphonia tenebrosa Harvey 1847, (Doring Bay, Muizenberg and Glencairn in False Bay eastward, Southern African endemic)

==== Family Spyridiaceae ====
- Spyridia filamentosa (Wulfen) Harvey in Hooker 1833, syn. Fucus filamentosus Wulfen 1803, Hutchinsia filamentosa (Wulfen) C.Agardh 1824, Polysiphonia filamentosa (Wulfen) Sprengel 1827, Ceramium filamentosum (Wulfen) C.Agardh 1828, (Rare in Western Cape. False Bay, Eastern Cape to tropical East Africa)
- Spyridia plumosa F.Schmitz ex J.Agardh 1897, (Camps Bay, Kowie area, extending into KwaZulu-Natal as far as Shelly Beach, endemic)

==== Family Wrangeliaceae ====
- Anotrichium furcellatum (J.Agardh) Baldock 1976, syn. Griffithsia furcellata J.Agardh 1842, Neomonospora furcellata (J.Agardh) Feldmann-Mazoyer & Meslin 1939, Corynospora furcellata (J.Agardh) Levring 1974, (False Bay, Kowie)
- Anotrichium tenue (C.Agardh) Nägeli 1862, syn. Griffithsia tenuis C.Agardh 1828, (Doring Bay to Cape Agulhas and further east to KwaZulu-Natal)
- Griffithsia confervoides Suhr 1840, (Namibia to KwaZulu-Natal, Southern African endemic)
- Gymnothamnion elegans (Schousboe ex C.Agardh) J.Agardh 1892, syn. Callithamnion elegans Schousboe ex C.Agardh 1828, (Bakoven on Cape Peninsula to KwaZulu-Natal)
- Gymnothamnion elegans var. bisporum Stegenga 1986, (Hout Bay to East London, endemic)
- Hommersandiella humilis (Kützing) Alongi, Cormaci & G.Furnari 2007, syn. Callithamnion humile Kützing 1849, Lomathamnion humile (Kützing) Stegenga 1989, (Namibia to Cape Hangklip, Southern African endemic)
- Lomathamnion capense Stegenga 1984, (Cape Point to Arniston, endemic)
- Pleonosporium filicinum (Harvey ex J.Agardh) De Toni 1903, syn. Halothamnion filicinum Harvey ex J.Agardh 1876, (Swartklip in False Bay to Natal, Southern African endemic)
- Pleonosporium harveyanum (J.Agardh) De Toni 1903, syn. Halothamnion harveyanum J.Agardh 1876, (Namibia to East London, Southern African endemic)
- Pleonosporium paternoster Stegenga 1986, (Paternoster and Oudekraal, endemic)
- Pleonosporium ramulosum (J.Agardh) De Toni 1903, Corynospora ramulosa J.Agardh 1851, (Port Nolloth to southern Cape Peninsula, endemic)
- Ptilothamnion polysporum Gordon-Mills & Wollaston in Wollaston 1984; (Swartklip in False Bay to Mozambique)
- Spongoclonium caribaeum (Børgesen) M.J.Wynne 2005, syn. Mesothamnion caribaeum Børgesen 1917, Pleonosporium caribaeum (Børgesen) R.E.Norris 1985, (Clovelly in False Bay to KwaZulu-Natal, Widespread in tropical regions.)
- Tiffaniella cymodoceae (Børgesen) E.M.Gordon 1972, syn. Spermothamnion cymodoceae Børgesen 1952, (Platbank on Cape Peninsula to Mozambique)
- Tiffaniella schmitziana (E.S.Barton) Bolton & Stegenga 1987, syn. Spermothamnion schmitzianum E.S.Barton 1893, (Kraalbaai, Strandfontein, Port Elizabeth to Hluleka, endemic)
- Wrangelia purpurifera J.Agardh 1863, (Paternoster to Kowie River, endemic)

=== Order Colaconematales ===
==== Family Colaconemataceae ====
- Colaconema caespitosum (J.Agardh) Jackelman, Stegenga & J.J.Bolton 1991, (Kommetjie eastward entire south coast and Eastern Cape)
- Colaconema daviesii (Dillwyn) Stegenga 1985, (Hondeklipbaai to Transkei)
- Colaconema interpositum (Heydrich) H.Stegenga, J.J.Bolton & R.J.Anderson 1997, (Platbank, Cape Peninsula)
- Colaconema nemalionis (De Notaris ex L.Dufour) Stegenga 1985, (Hondeklip Bay to East London)
- Colaconema panduripodium H.Stegenga, J.J.Bolton & R.J.Anderson 1997, (Hondeklip Bay and Oudekraal, endemic)

=== Order Corallinales ===
==== Family Corallinaceae ====
- Amphiroa capensis Areschoug 1852, (Llandudno on Cape Peninsula to Kowie River, endemic)
- Amphiroa epheddraea horsetail coralline,
- Arthrocardia corymbosa (Lamarck) Decaisne 1842, syn. Corallina corymbosa Lamarck 1815, Amphiroa corymbosa (Lamarck) Decaisne 1842, Cheilosporum corymbosum (Lamarck) Decaisne 1842, (Southern Cape Peninsula eastward)
- Arthrocardia flabellata (Kützing) Manza 1940, syn. Corallina flabellata Kützing 1858, (Probably along most of the southern African coast) (Probably along the entire South African coast extending into Mozambique)
- Arthrocardia filicula (Lamarck) Johansen 1984, syn. Corallina filicula Lamarck 1815, Cheilosporum palmatum var. filicula (Lamarck) Yendo 1902, (Namibia and west coast)
- Feather coralline, Corallina officinalis Linnaeus 1758, (Oudekraal to Kowie river) (Oudekraal eastward to Mission Rocks)
- Hydrolithon samoënse (Foslie) Keats & Y.M.Chamberlain 1994, syn. Lithophyllum samoënse Foslie 1906, Pseudolithophyllum samoënse (Foslie) Adey 1970, (Yzerfontein, Western Cape to Sodwana Bay, KwaZulu-Natal.)
- Finely forked coralline, Jania adhaerens J.V.Lamouroux, 1816 (TMNPMPA)
- Jania crassa J.V.Lamouroux 1821, (St. James in False Bay, Eastern Cape and KwaZulu-Natal)
- Arrowhead coralline, Jania cultrata (Harvey) J.H.Kim, Guiry & H.-G.Choi 2007, syn. Amphiroa cultrata Harvey 1849, Cheilosporum cultratum (Harvey) Areschoug 1852, (as Cheilosporum cultratum, Platboombaai on Cape Peninsula to Mozambique)
- Jania sagittata (J.V.Lamouroux) Blainville 1834, syn. Corallina sagittata J.V.Lamouroux 1824, Amphiroa sagittata (J.V.Lamouroux) Decaisne 1842, Arthrocardia sagittata (J.V.Lamouroux) Decaisne 1842, Cheilosporum sagittatum (J.V.Lamouroux) Areschoug 1852, (as Cheilosporum sagittatum, Melkbosstrand to northern Mabibi in KwaZulu-Natal.)
- Jania verrucosa J.V.Lamouroux 1816, syn. Corallina verrucosa (Lamouroux) Kützing 1858, (False Bay eastward)
- Lithophyllum corallinae (P.L.Crouan & H.M.Crouan) Heydrich 1897, syn. Melobesia corallinae P.L.Crouan & H.M.Crouan 1867, Dermatolithon corallinae (P.L.Crouan & H.M.Crouan) Foslie 1902, Lithophyllum pustulatum var. corallinae (P.L.Crouan & H.M.Crouan) Foslie 1905, Lithophyllum macrocarpum f. corallinae (P.L.Crouan & H.M.Crouan) Foslie 1909, Tenarea corallinae (P.L.Crouan & H.M.Crouan) Notoya 1974, Titanoderma corallinae (P.L.Crouan & H.M.Crouan) Woelkerling, Y.M.Chamberlain & P.C.Silva 1985, (Kommetjie (Western Cape) to KwaZulu-Natal)
- Lithophyllum neoatalayense Masaki 1968, (as Titanoderma neoatalayense, Groenriviermond (Northern Cape) to Cape Agulhas (Western Cape))
- Lithophyllum polycephalum Foslie, syn. Titanoderma polycephalum (Foslie) Woelkerling, Y.M.Chamberlain & P.C.Silva 1985, (as Titanoderma polycephalum, False Bay to Cape Agulhas (Western Cape))
- Lithophyllum pustulatum (J.V.Lamouroux) Foslie 1904, syn. Melobesia pustulata J.V.Lamouroux 1816, Titanoderma pustulatum (J.V.Lamouroux) Nägeli 1858, Dermatolithon pustulatum (J.V.Lamouroux) Foslie 1898, Epilithon pustulatum (J.V.Lamouroux) M.Lemoine 1921, Tenarea pustulata (J.V.Lamouroux) Shameel 1983, (as Titanoderma pustulatum, Occasional throughout the west coast and increasing in abundance toward KwaZulu-Natal where it is particularly abundant.)
- Pneophyllum coronatum (Rosanoff) Penrose in Chamberlain 1994, syn. Melobesia coronata Rosanoff 1866, (Oudekraal, western Cape Peninsula, Western Cape.)
- Pneophyllum fragile Kützing 1843, (Widespread along the west coast.)
- Pneophyllum keatsii Y.M.Chamberlain 1994, (Oudekraal, western Cape Peninsula, Western Cape, to Cape Agulhas, Western Cape.)
- Spongites discoidea (Foslie) D.Penrose & Woelkerling 1988, syn. Lithophyllum discoideum Foslie 1900, Hydrolithon discoideum (Foslie) M.L.Mendoza & J.Cabioch 1985, (Port Nolloth, Northern Cape, to Cape Agulhas, Western Cape.)
- Scrolled coralline crust, Spongites impar (Foslie) Y.M.Chamberlain 1994, syn. Lithophyllum impar Foslie 1909, (Cape St. Martin just south of St. Helena Bay, Western Cape, to Oudekraal, western Cape Peninsula, Western Cape.)
- Cochlear coralline crust, Spongites yendoi (Foslie) Y.M.Chamberlain 1993, syn. Lithophyllum yendoi (Foslie) Foslie 1900, Goniolithon yendoi Foslie 1900, Lithothamnion yendoi (Foslie) Lemoine 1965, Pseudolithophyllum yendoi (Foslie) Adey 1970, (Throughout South Africa (Namibia to the Mozambican border). Most abundant along the southern west and south coasts, becoming less common toward the east.)

=== Order Gelidiales ===
==== Family Gelidiaceae ====
- Gelidium abbottiorum R.E.Norris, 1990 (TMNPMPA)
- Gelidium applanatum Stegenga, Bolton & R.J.Anderson 1997, (Vulcan Rock off Hout Bay and Muizenberg)
- Cape jelly-weed, Gelidium capense (S.G.Gmelin) P.C.Silva in P.C.Silva, E.G.Meñez, & Moe 1987, (Melkbosstrand to Kenton on Sea Eastern Cape. Endemic?)
- Gelidium micropterum Kützing 1868, (Cape Peninsula to Knysna)
- Saw-edged jelly-weed, Gelidium pristoides (Turner) Kützing 1843, (Sea Point and False Bay eastwards)
- Fern-leafed jelly-weed, Gelidium pteridifolium R.E.Norris, Hommersand & Fredericq 1987, (Glencairn, Cape Hangklip, Eastern Cape and southern KwaZulu-Natal up to Tinley Manor just north of Durban)
- Turf jelly-weed, Gelidium reptans (Suhr) Kylin 1938, syn. Phyllophora reptans Suhr 1841, (Cape Peninsula and False Bay to KwaZulu-Natal and Mozambique)
- Red ribbons, Gelidium vittatum (Linnaeus) Kützing 1843, syn. Fucus vittatus Linnaeus 1767, Suhria vittata (Linnaeus) Endlicher 1843, Chaetangium vittatum (Linnaeus) P.G.Parkinson 1981, (Möwe Bay, Nabibia to Brandfontein, drift specimens to Port Elizabeth)

=== Order Gigartinales ===
==== Family Caulacanthaceae ====
- Spiky turf-weed, Caulacanthus ustulatus (Mertens ex Turner) Kützing 1843, syn. Fucus acicularis var. ustulatus Mertens ex Turner 1808, Sphaerococcus ustulatus (Mertens ex Turner) C.Agardh 1828, Gigartina ustulata (Mertens ex Turner) Greville 1830, Hypnea ustulata (Mertens ex Turner) Montagne 1840, Gelidium ustulatum (Mertens ex Turner) J.Agardh 1842, Olivia ustulata (Mertens ex Turner) Montagne 1846, (Whole South African coast)
- Heringia mirabilis (C.Agardh) J.Agardh 1846, syn. Sphaerococcus mirabilis C.Agardh 1820, (Namibia to East london, Southern African endemic)

==== Family Cystocloniaceae ====
- Straight-tipped hypnea, Hypnea ecklonii Suhr 1836, (Pearly Beach to Namibia, Southern African endemic)
- Hypnea rosea Papenfuss 1947, (Strand in False Bay and Die Walle, just west of Cape Agulhas, and south and east coasts, endemic)
- Green tips, Hypnea spicifera (Suhr) Harvey in J. Agardh 1847, syn. Gracilaria spicifera Suhr 1834, Hypnophycus spicifera (Suhr) Kützing 1843, (virtually the entire South African coast, Southern African endemic)
- Fine hypnea, Hypnea tenuis Kylin 1938, (Mainly south and east coast, as far west as Swartklip in False Bay)
- Roseleaf, Rhodophyllis reptans (Suhr) Papenfuss 1956, syn. Halymenia reptans Suhr 1834, Euhymenia reptans (Suhr) Kützing 1849, Kallymenia reptans (Suhr) E.S.Barton 1893, (Hondeklipbaai to KwaZulu-Natal, Southern African endemic)

==== Family Gigartinaceae ====
- Red tongue-weed, Gigartina bracteata (S.G.Gmelin) Setchell & N.L.Gardner 1933, syn. Fucus bracteatus S.G.Gmelin 1768, (Namibia to Cape of Good Hope, drift material from Muizenberg, Southern African endemic)
- Gigartina insignis (Endlicher & Diesing) F.Schmitz in E.S.Barton 1896, syn. Iridaea insignis Endlicher & Diesing 1845, (Muizenberg, Cape Hangklip to Kowie River, Southern African endemic)
- Gigartina pistillata (S.G.Gmelin) Stackhouse 1809, syn. Fucus pistillatus S.G.Gmelin 1768, (Smitswinkel Bay and Swartklip east to the Kowie area)
- Tongue-weed, Gigartina polycarpa (Kützing) Setchell & N.L.Gardner, 1933 (TMNPMPA)
- Gigartina tysonii Reinbold in Tyson 1912, (Three Anchor Bay to Camps Bay, drift specimens from Platboombaai and Olifantsbos, endemic)
- Gigartina scabiosa (Kützing) Papenfuss (date not specified) (TMNPMPA)
- Iridaea convoluta (Areschoug ex J Agardh) Hewitt 1960, syn. Gigartina convoluta Areschoug ex J.Agardh 1899, (Table Bay to Cape of Good Hope, endemic)
- Spotted mazzaella, Mazzaella capensis (J.Agardh) Fredericq in Hommersand et al. 1993, Iridaea capensis J.Agardh 1848, Iridophycus capensis (J.Agardh) Setchell & N.L.Gardner 1936, Gigartina capensis (J.Agardh) D.H.Kim 1976, (Port Nolloth to Cape Agulhas, extending into Namibia, Southern African endemic)
- Convoluted mazzaella Mazzaella convoluta (Areschoug ex J.Agardh) Hommersand, 1994, (TMNPMPA)
- Rhodoglossum alcicorne Stegenga, Bolton & R.J.Anderson 1997, (Hout Bay, endemic)
- Sarcothalia radula (Esper) Edyvane & Womersley 1994, syn. Fucus radula Esper 1802, Sphaerococcus radula (Esper) C.Agardh 1822, Iridaea radula (Esper) Bory de Saint-Vincent 1828, Gigartina radula (Esper) J.Agardh 1851, (Port Nolloth to Cape Agulhas, rare at De Hoop, extending into Namibia)
- Forked gigartina, Sarcothalia scutellata (Hering) Leister 1993, syn. Sphaerococcus scutellatus Hering 1841, Dicurella scutellata (Hering) Papenfuss 1940, Gigartina scutellata (Hering) Simons 1983, (Namibia to Cape Hangklip)
- Twisted togue-weed, Sarcothalia stiriata (Turner) Leister in Hommersand, Guiry, Fredericq & Leister 1993, syn. Fucus stiriata Turner 1807, Sphaerococcus stiriatus (Turner) C.Agardh 1817, Sphaerococcus radula var. stiriatus (Turner) Rudolphi 1831, Mastocarpus stiriatus (Turner) Kützing 1843, Gigartina stiriata (Turner) J.Agardh 1851, (Namibia and Port Nolloth to Cape Agulhas) as Gigartina stiriata in TMNPMPA.

==== Family Kallymeniaceae ====
- Kallymenia agardhii R.E.Norris 1964, (Namibia to Cape Agulhas, Southern African endemic)
- Kallymenia schizophylla J.Agardh 1848, (Namibia to southern Cape Peninsula and Cape Hangklip. Southern African endemic)
- Pugetia harveyana (J.Agardh) R.E.Norris 1964, syn. Kallymenia harveyana J.Agardh 1844, (Namibia to southern Cape Peninsula, Drift material from Muizenberg)
- Split disc-weed, Thamnophyllis discigera (J.Agardh) R.E.Norris 1964, syn. Rhodymenia discigera J.Agardh 1841, Callophyllis discigera (J.Agardh) J.Agardh 1847, (Port Nolloth to Cape Agulhas)
- Thamnophyllis pocockiae R.E.Norris 1964, (St Helena bay to East London)

==== Family Phyllophoraceae ====
- Ahnfeltiopsis complicata (Kützing) P.C.Silva & DeCew 1992, complicated gymnogongrus, syn. Chondrus complicatus Kützing 1849, Gymnogongrus complicatus (Kützing) Papenfuss 1943, (Namibia to False Bay, Southern African endemic)
- Ahnfeltiopsis glomerata (J.Agardh) P.C.Silva & DeCew 1992, clustered gymnogongrus, syn. Gymnogongrus glomeratus J.Agardh 1849, (Namibia to Cape Agulhas, Southern African endemic)
- Ahnfeltiopsis intermedia (Kylin) Stegenga, Bolton & R.J.Anderson 1997, gymnogongrus, syn. Gymnogongrus intermedius Kylin 1938, (Kalk Bay, Sea Point and possibly Keurboomstrand in Plettenberg Bay)
- Ahnfeltiopsis polyclada (Kützing) P.C.Silva & DeCew 1992, fine gymnogongrus, syn. Chondrus polycladus Kützing 1849, Gymnogongrus polycladus (Kützing) J.Agardh 1851, (False Bay to Brandfontein, possibly Melkbosstrand and Postberg)
- Ahnfeltiopsis vermicularis (C.Agardh) P.C.Silva & DeCew 1992, fine gymnogongrus,syn. Sphaerococcus vermicularis C.Agardh 1817, Gymnogongrus vermicularis (C.Agardh) J.Agardh 1851, (Hondeklipbaai to False Bay, South African endemic)
- Dilated gymnogongrus, Gymnogongrus dilatatus (Turner) J.Agardh 1851, syn. Fucus dilatatus Turner 1811, Sphaerococcus dilatatus (Turner) C.Agardh 1817, Pachycarpus dilatatus (Turner) Kützing 1843, (Namibia to southern Cape Peninsula, drift material from Muizenberg)

==== Family Rhizophyllidaceae ====
- Portieria hornemannii (Lyngbye) P.C.Silva in P.C. Silva, Meñez & Moe 1987, syn. Desmia hornemannii Lyngbye 1819, Chondrococcus hornemannii (Lyngbye) F.Schmitz 1895, (Table Bay, False Bay, south and east coast, extending into Mozambique)

=== Order Gracilariales ===
==== Family Gracilariaceae ====
- Agar-weed, Gracilaria gracilis (Stackhouse) Steentoft, L.M.Irvine & Farnham, 1995 (TMNPMPA)
- Gracilaria verrucosa (Hudson) Papenfuss 1950, syn. Fucus verrucosus Hudson 1762, (recorded from: St Helena Bay, Velddrif, Saldanha Bay, Langebaan Lagoon, Table Bay, False bay, Swartkops River)
- Gracilariopsis lemaneiformis(Bory de Saint-Vincent) E.Y.Dawson, Acleto & Foldvik 1964, syn. Gigartina lemaneiformis Bory de Saint-Vincent 1828, Gracilaria lemaneiformis (Bory de Saint-Vincent) Greville 1830, Cordylecladia lemanaeformis (Bory de Saint-Vincent) M.A.Howe 1914, (Simon's Town in False Bay)

==== Family Pterocladiophilaceae ====
- Gelidiocolax suhriae (M.T.Martin & M.A.Pocock) K.-C.Fan & Papenfuss 1959, syn. Choreocolax suhriae M.T.Martin & M.A.Pocock 1953, (Blaauwberg to Strandfontein, endemic)

=== Order Halymeniales ===
==== Family Grateloupiaceae ====
- Grateloupia doryphora (Montagne) M.A.Howe 1914, syn. Halymenia doryphora Montagne 1839, (Port Nolloth to Cape Agulhas)
- Grateloupia filicina (J.V.Lamouroux) C.Agardh 1822, syn. Delesseria filicina J.V.Lamouroux 1813, (Whole west coast and south coast to Eastern Cape as far as the Kowie area)
- Grateloupia longifolia Kylin, 1938, (TMNPMPA),

==== Family Halymeniaceae ====
- Red rubber-weed, Pachymenia carnosa (J.Agardh) J.Agardh 1876, syn. Platymenia carnosa J.Agardh 1848. Iridaea carnosa (J.Agardh) Kützing 1849, Schizymenia carnosa (J.Agardh) J.Agardh 1851, (Whole west coast into Namibia, eastward to Brandtfontein)
- Pachymenia cornea (Kützing) Chiang 1970, syn. Iridaea cornea Kützing 1867, Cyrtymenia cornea (Kützing) F.Schmitz 1897, Phyllymenia cornea (Kützing) Setchell & Gardner 1936, (Doring Bay to East London)
- Pachymenia orbitosa (Suhr) L.K.Russell in L.K. Russell et al. 2009, slippery orbits, syn. Iridaea orbitosa Suhr 1840, Aeodes orbitosa (Suhr) F.Schmitz 1894, (Whole Cape west coast, extending into Namibia, and eastward at least as far as Cape Agulhas, endemic)
- Corrugated red algae, Phyllymenia belangeri (Bory de Saint-Vincent) Setchell & N.L.Gardner, 1936 recorded as syn. Grateloupia belangeri (Bory de Saint-Vincent) De Clerck, Gavio, Fredericq, Cocquyt & Coppejans, 2005, syn. Iridaea belangeri Bory de Saint-Vincent 1834, (Whole west coast extending into Namibia. Southernmost record from Platboombaai, endemic) (TMNPMPA)
- Tattered rag-weed, Phyllymenia capensis (O.De Clerck) Gargiulo, M.Morabito & Manghisi, 2013, (TMNPMPA) recorded as syn. Grateloupia capensis O.De Clerck, 2005.
- Constricted polyopes, Polyopes constrictus (Turner) J.Agardh 1851, syn. Fucus constrictus Turner 1809, Sphaerococcus constrictus (Turner) C.Agardh 1822, Gelidium constrictum (Turner) Kützing 1849, (Doring Bay to Kei River mouth)

==== Family Tsengiaceae ====
- Lance-weed, Tsengia lanceolata (J.Agardh) Saunders & Kraft 2002, syn. Nemastoma lanceolatum J.Agardh 1847, (Hondeklipbaai to Cape Hangklip)
- Tsengia pulchra (Baardseth) Masuda & Guiry 1994, syn. Nemastoma pulchrum Baardseth 1941, (found only once at the Cape of Good Hope)

=== Order Hapalidiales ===
==== Family Hapalidiaceae ====
- Thin coralline crust, Phymatolithon foveatum (Y.M.Chamberlain & Keats) Maneveldt & E.Van der Merwe 2014, (TMNPMPA), syn. Leptophytum foveatum Y.M.Chamberlain & D.W.Keats, 1994.

=== Order Hildenbrandiales ===
==== Family Hildenbrandiaceae ====
- Tar crust, Hildenbrandia lecannellieri Hariot 1887, (Entire west coast and east coast as far as Port Elizabeth)
- Hildenbrandia rubra (Sommerfelt) Meneghini 1841, (Probably the whole of the west coast)

=== Order Nemaliales ===
==== Family Liagoraceae ====
- Helminthocladia papenfussii Kylin 1938, (Oudekraal eastward at least as far as Cape Morgan)
- Helminthora furcellata (Reinbold ex Tyson) M.T.Martin 1947, (Endemic, Three Anchor Bay to Cape Hangklip)

==== Family Scinaiaceae ====
- Hedgehog seaweed, Nothogenia erinacea (Turner) P.G.Parkinson 1983, (Cape Fria, Namibia to East London)
- Balloon weed, Nothogenia ovalis (Suhr) P.G.Parkinson 1983, syn. Dumontia ovalis Suhr 1840, (Endemic, Möwe Bay, Namibia to Cape Agulhas)
- Scinaia capensis (Setchell) Huisman 1985, syn. Gloiophloea capensis Setchell 1914, (Endemic, Melkbosstrand to Kowie area of Eastern Cape)
- Ramrod weed, Scinaia salicornioides (Kützing) J.Agardh 1851, syn. Ginnania salicornioides Kützing, (Endemic, Muizenberg to east coast)

=== Order Nemastomatales ===
==== Family Schizymeniaceae ====
- Schizymenia apoda (J.Agardh) J.Agardh 1851, syn. Platymenia apoda J.Agardh 1848, Platymenia undulata var. obovata J.Agardh 1848, Schizymenia obovata (J.Agardh) J.Agardh 1851, (Port Nolloth to Cape Agulhas)

=== Order Palmariales ===
==== Family Meiodiscaceae ====
- Meiodiscus concrescens (K.M.Drew) P.W.Gabrielson in Gabrielsen et al. 2000, syn. Audouinella concrescens (K.M.Drew) P.S.Dixon 1976, Rhodochorton concrescens, K.M. Drew 1928, (Hout Bay)

==== Family Rhodophysemataceae ====
- Rhodophysema feldmannii Cabioch 1975, (Hout Bay to Platbank on Cape Peninsula)

==== Family Rhodothamniellaceae ====
- Rhodothamniella floridula (Dillwyn) Feldmann in T.Christensen 1978, (Lambert's Bay to Hluleka, Transkei)

=== Order Peyssonneliales ===
==== Family Peyssonneliaceae ====
- Peyssonnelia atropurpurea P.L.Crouan & H.M.Crouan 1867, (Yzerfontein to Brandfontein)
- Red Fan-weed, Sonderophycus capensis (Montagne) M.J.Wynne 2011, Peyssonnelia capensis Montagne 1847, Pterigospermum capense (Montagne) Kuntze 1891, Sonderopelta capensis (Montagne) A.D.Krayesky 2009, (as Peyssonnelia capensis, Hout Bay on Cape Peninsula eastwards extending into Mozambique)

=== Order Plocamiales ===
==== Family Plocamiaceae ====
- Plocamiocolax papenfussianus M.F.Martin & M.A.Pocock 1953, (Melkbosstrand to East London, endemic) (Arniston north to Rabbit Rock in KwaZulu-Natal)
- Plocamium beckeri F.Schmitz ex Simons 1964, (Collected at Muizenberg, Eastern Cape and KwaZulu-Natal)
- Coral plocamium Plocamium corallorhiza (Turner) J.D.Hooker & Harvey 1845, syn. Fucus corallorhiza Turner 1808, Thamnophora corallorhiza (Turner) C.Agardh 1822, (Yzerfontein to KwaZulu-Natal extending into southern Mozambique)
- Horny plocamium, Plocamium cornutum (Turner) Harvey 1849, syn. Fucus cornutus Turner 1819, Thamnophora cornuta (Turner) Greville 1830, Thamnocarpus cornutus (Turner) Kützing 1843, (entire coastline of the Western Cape to Namibia, rarer in the Eastern Cape, Southern African endemic)
- Plocamium glomeratum J.Agardh 1851, (Namibia to Still Bay, Southern African endemic)
- Plocamium maxillosum (Poiret) J.V.Lamouroux 1813, syn. Fucus maxillosus Poiret 1808, (Hondeklipbaai to Cape Agulhas, endemic)
- Rigid plocamium, Plocamium rigidum Bory de Saint-Vincent in Bélanger & Bory de Saint-Vincent 1834, syn. Nereidea rigida (Bory de Saint-Vincent) Kuntze 1891, (Namibia to Eastern Cape, Southern African endemic)
- Plocamium sp. indet. (False Bay coast, endemic?)

==== Family Sarcodiaceae ====
- Comb-fan weed, Trematocarpus flabellatus (J.Agardh) De Toni 1900, syn. Phyllotylus flabellatus J.Agardh 1847, Dicurella flabellata (J.Agardh) J.Agardh 1852, (Lüderitz to Port Elizabeth, Southern African endemic)
- Trematocarpus fragilis (C.Agardh) De Toni 1900, syn. Sphaerococcus fragilis C.Agardh 1822, Chondrus fragilis (C.Agardh) Greville 1830, Dicurella fragilis (C.Agardh) J.Agardh 1852, (Port Nolloth to Brandfontein, Southern African endemic)

=== Order Rhodymeniales ===
==== Family Champiaceae ====
- Compressed champia. Champia compressa Harvey 1838, (False Bay eastward to northern KwaZulu-Natal and extending into Mozambique. Rarer on west side of Cape Peninsula and also found at Kraalbaai and Paternoster)
- Earthworm champia, Champia lumbricalis (Linnaeus) Desvaux, 1809.

==== Family Lomentariaceae ====
- Lomentaria diffusa Stegenga, Bolton & R.J.Anderson 1997, (Saldanha Bay and Kraalbaai to Brandfontein, endemic)

==== Family Rhodymeniaceae ====
- Botryocladia paucivesicaria Stegenga, Bolton & R.J.Anderson 1997, (Known from drift specimens collected on the west side of Cape peninsula at Noordhoek Beach and Olifantsbos, endemic)
- Cape wine-weed, Rhodymenia capensis J.Agardh 1894, syn. Epymenia capensis (J.Agardh) Papenfuss 1940,
- Rhodymenia holmesii Ardissone 1893, (drift material from Olifantsbos) (Southern half of the Cape Peninsula, endemic)
- Stalked roseweed, Rhodymenia natalensis Kylin 1938, (From Namibia along the whole of the South African coast extending into southern Mozambique)
- Broad wine weed, Rhodymenia obtusa (Greville) Womersley 1996, syn. Phyllophora obtusa Greville 1831, Epymenia obtusa (Greville) Kützing 1849, (Muizenberg and the southern Cape Peninsula to Namibia)
- Palmate roseweed, Rhodymenia pseudopalmata (J.V.Lamouroux) P.C.Silva 1952, syn. Fucus pseudopalmatus J.V.Lamouroux 1805, Delesseria pseudopalmata (J.V.Lamouroux) J.V.Lamouroux 1813, (From drift at Strandfontein)

=== Order Sporolithales ===
==== Family Sporolithaceae ====
- Velvety coralline crust, Heydrichia woelkerlingii R.A.Townsend, Y.M.Chamberlain & Keats, 1994 (TMNPMPA)

== Class Rhodophyta incertae sedis ==
=== Order Rhodophycophyta incertae sedis ===
==== Family Rhodophycophyta incertae sedis ====
- Callophycus densus (Sonder) Kraft 1984, syn. Thysanocladia densa Sonder 1871, (Olifantsbos to southern KwaZulu-Natal)

== Class: Stylonematophyceae ==
=== Order: Stylonematales ===
==== Family Stylonemataceae ====
- Stylonema alsidii (Zanardini, 1840) K.M.Drew 1956, (Saldanha Bay southward, and south coast of Western Cape, Eastern Cape to Kwa-Zulu Natal)
- Neevea cf repens Batters 1900, (Hout Bay)

== Geographical position of places mentioned in species ranges ==
- Algoa Bay, Eastern Cape, 33°55′S 25°42′E
- Aliwal shoal, KwaZulu-Natal, 30°15′30″S 30°49′30″E
- Arniston (Waenhuiskrans), Western Cape, 34°40′S 20°14′E
- Betty's Bay, Western Cape, 34°22′S 18°56′E
- Bhanga Neck, KwaZulu-Natal, 27°01′00″S 32°50′00″E
- Bird Island, Eastern Cape, 33°50′28″S 26°17′10″E
- Blaauwberg, Western Cape, 33°48′S 18°27′E
- Black Rock, Northern KwaZulu-Natal, 27°08′00″S 32°50′00″E
- Brandfontein, Western Cape, 34°46′S 19°52′E
- Buffelsbaai (Cape Peninsula), Western Cape, 34°19′10″S 18°27′41″E
- Buffelsbaai (west coast), Western Cape, 33°35′S 18°21′E
- Buffelsbaai (south coast), Western Cape, 34°05′S 22°58′E
- Cape Agulhas, Western Cape, 34°50′00″S 20°00′09″E
- Cape Columbine, Western Cape, 32°49′39″S 17°51′23″E
- Cape Frio, Namibia, 18°26′12″S 12°00′17″E
- Cape of Good Hope, Western Cape, 34°21′29″S 018°28′19″E (sometimes used historically to refer to the Cape Province, or South Africa)
- Cape Peninsula, Western Cape 34°12′S 18°24′E
- Cape Hangklip, Western Cape, 34°23′17″S 018°49′35″E
- Cape Infanta, Western Cape, 34°25′S 20°51′E
- Clovelly, False Bay, Western Cape, 34°09′29″S 18°26′11″E
- Dalebrook, False Bay, Western Cape, 34°07′29″S 18°27′11″E
- Danger Point, Western Cape, 34°37′55″S 19°17′34″E
- De Hoop, Western Cape, (just west of Cape Infanta) 32°26′03″S 20°32′52″E
- De Walle, (Die Walle), (Just west of Agulhas)
- Die Dam (Quoin Point), Western Cape, 34°46′S 19°41′E
- Doring Bay (Doringbaai), Western Cape, 31°49′S 18°14′E
- Durban, KwaZulu-Natal, 29°51′S 31°01′E
- Dwesa, Eastern Cape, 32°15′36″S 28°53′42″E
- East London, Eastern Cape, 32°59′S 027°52′E
- False Bay, Western Cape, 34°14′S 18°39′E
- Glencairn, False Bay, Western Cape, 34°09′50″S 18°26′00″E
- Groenrivier (Groen River), 30°50′55″S 17°34′20″E
- Groot Bergrivier estuary (Berg River, Velddrif), Western Cape, 32°47′S 18°10′E
- Haga Haga, Eastern Cape (N of E.London) 32°46′S 28°15′E
- The Haven, Eastern Cape, 150 km west of Port St. Johns, 32°14′50″S 28°55′15″E
- Hermanus, Western Cape, 34°25′S 19°14′E
- Hluleka, Eastern Cape, 31°49′S 29°18′E
- Hondeklipbaai, Northern Cape, 30°19′S 17°16′E
- Hout Bay, Cape Peninsula, Western Cape, 34°03′30″S 18°21′20″E
- Isipingo, KwaZulu-Natal, 29°59′50″S 30°57′20″E
- Island Rock, KwaZulu-Natal, 27°17′00″S 32°46′00″E
- Kalk Bay, False Bay, Western Cape, 34°07′40″S 18°27′00″E
- Kei River, Eastern Cape, 32°40′35″S 28°23′10″E
- Kenton-on-Sea, Eastern Cape, 33°42′S 26°41′E
- Keurboomstrand, Plettenberg Bay, Western Cape, 34°02′17″S 23°23′31″E
- Knysna, Western Cape, 34°05′02″S 23°03′37″E
- Kommetjie, Western Cape, 34°08′S 18°19′E
- Koppie Alleen, De Hoop, Western Cape,
- Kosi Bay, Kwa-Zulu-Natal, 26°54′06″S 32°51′59″E
- Kowie River, Eastern Cape, 33°36′15″S 26°54′12″E
- Kraalbaai, Langebaan lagoon, Western Cape, 33°08′30″S 18°01′45″E
- Lala Nek, KwaZulu-Natal, 27°13′00″S 32°48′00″E
- Lamberts Bay, Western Cape, 32°05′24″S 18°18′10″E
- Leadsman shoal, KwaZulu-Natal, 28°23′00″S 32°25′15″E
- Langebaan Lagoon, Western Cape, 33°09′S 18°04′E
- Llandudno, Cape Peninsula, Western Cape, 34°00′30″S 18°20′20″E
- Lüderitz, Namibia, 26°38′53″S 15°9′34″E
- Mabibi, Kwa-Zulu-Natal, 29°20′10″S 32°45′10″E
- Mapelane, Maphelana, KwaZulu-Natal, near St. Lucia, 28°24′28″S 32°25′44″E
- Melkbosstrand, Western Cape, 33°43′38″S 18°26′06″E
- Mission Rocks, KwaZulu-Natal, 28°16′23″S 32°29′55″E
- Mkambati, KwaZulu-Natal, 31°17′S 29°57′E
- Morgan's Bay, Eastern Cape, (Near Kei mouth) 32°42′0″S 28°21′0″E
- Möwe Bay, Namibia, 19°22′48″S 12°42′29″E(Möwe Point lighthouse)
- Mtwalume river, KwaZulu-Natal,
- Noordhoek, Cape Peninsula, Western Cape, 34°07′S 18°21′E
- Muizenberg, False Bay, Western Cape, 34°07′S 018°28′E
- Oatlands Point, False Bay, Western Cape, 34°12′30″S 18°27′44″E
- Oudekraal, Cape Peninsula, Western Cape, 33°59′09″S 18°20′55″E
- Olifantsbos, Cape Peninsula, Western Cape, 34°16′23″S 18°22′45″E
- Palm Beach, South Africa, 30°59′S 30°16′E
- Park Rynie, KwaZulu-Natal, 30°19′S 30°44′E
- Paternoster, Western Cape, 32°49′S 17°53′E
- Papenkuilsfontein, Western Cape, 10 km west of Agulhas
- Pearly Beach, Western Cape, 34°39′S 19°29′E
- Platbank, Cape Peninsula, Western Cape, °'"S °'E34°20′5″S 18°29′09″E
- Platboombaai, 34°20′20″S 18°27′08″E
- Plettenberg Bay, Western Cape, 34°03′S 023°22′E
- Ponta do Ouro, Mozambique border, 26°50′36″S 32°53′48″E
- Port Alfred, Eastern Cape, 33°36′15″S 26°54′12″E
- Port Edward, KwaZulu-Natal 31°03′S 30°13′E
- Port Elizabeth, Eastern Cape, 33°58′S 25°35′E
- Port Nolloth, Northern Cape, 22°15′S 16°52′E
- Port St. Johns, KwaZulu-Natal, 31°37′40″S 29°33′20″E
- Postberg, Western Cape, 33°07′S 18°00′E
- Protea Banks, KwaZulu-Natal, 30°50′S 30°28′E
- Rabbit Rock, KwaZulu-Natal,
- Robberg, Western Cape, 34°06′30″S 23°24′45″E
- Rocky Point, Namibia,
- Saldanha Bay, Western Cape, 33°01′S 17°59′E
- Saxon Reef, KwaZulu-Natal, (near Mozambique border),
- Scarborough, Cape Peninsula, Western Cape, 34°12′00″S 18°22′13″E
- Scottburgh, KwaZulu-Natal, 30°17′S 30°45′E
- Sea Point, Cape Peninsula, Western Cape, 33°55′19″S 18°22′37″E
- Shelly Beach, KwaZulu-Natal, KwaZulu-Natal, 30°48′S 30°25′E
- Simon's Town, Western Cape, 34°11′S 18°26′E
- Smitswinkel Bay, False Bay, Western Cape, 34°16′S 18°28′E
- Sodwana Bay, KwaZulu-Natal, 27°32′S 32°41′E
- Soetwater,
- Stilbaai (Still Bay), Western Cape, E34°22′S 21°25′E
- St Helena Bay, Western Cape, 32°43′S 18°06′E
- St. James, False Bay, Western Cape, 34°07′29″S 18°27′11″E
- St Lucia, KwaZulu-Natal, 28°23′03″S 32°25′46″E
- Strand, Western Cape, 34°07′S 18°49′E
- Strandfontein, False Bay, Western Cape, 34°05′22″S 18°33′18″E
- Strandfontein, Western Cape, 31°45′20″S 18°13′38″E
- Swakopmund, Namibia, 22°41′S 14°32′E
- Swartklip, False Bay, Western Cape, 34°04′30″S 18°41′10″E
- Swartkops River, 33°51′56″S 25°37′58″E
- Table Bay, Western Cape, 33°53′S 18°27′E
- Three Anchor Bay, Cape Peninsula, Western Cape, 33°54′22″S 19°23′51″E
- Three Sisters (Eastern Cape), Riet River, 10 km west of Port Alfred, Eastern Cape,
- Trafalgar, KwaZulu-Natal, 30°58′S 30°18′E
- Tsitsikamma, Eastern Cape, 34°01′18″S 22°53′44″E
- Umhlali, KwaZulu-Natal, (mHlali river mouth) 29°27′45″S 31°16′45″E
- Umpangazi, KwaZulu-Natal, (Cape Vidal?) 28°07′45″S 32°33′50″E
- Uvongo, KwaZulu-Natal, 30°49′S 30°23′E
- Waterloo Bay, Eastern Cape, 33°29′S 27°10′E
- Yzerfontein, Western Cape, 33°20′S 18°10′E

== See also ==
- Helderberg Marine Protected Area – Marine conservation area in the Western Cape in South Africa
- List of marine animals of the Cape Peninsula and False Bay
- List of red seaweeds of South Africa
- Geology of Cape Town
- Table Mountain National Park – Nature conservation area on the Cape Peninsula in Cape Town, South Africa
- Table Mountain National Park Marine Protected Area – Marine conservation area around the Cape Peninsula in South Africa
- False Bay – Bay of the Atlantic Ocean at South Africa
