= Erythrotrichia welwitschii =

Scientific classification
- Clade: Archaeplastida
- Division: Rhodophyta
- Class: Compsopogonophyceae
- Order: Erythropeltidales
- Family: Erythrotrichiaceae
- Genus: Erythrotrichia
- Species: E. welwitschii

Binomial name
- Erythrotrichia welwitschii (Ruprecht) Batters 1902

Synonyms
- Cruoria welwitschii Ruprecht 1850,

Species of alga

Erythrotrichia welwitschii is a red algae species in the genus Erythrotrichia found in South Africa from Cape of Good Hope and False Bay extending eastwards at least as far as Port Elizabeth.
