= Eva Konrad Hawkins =

Hungarian-born American biologist and professor (1930–2020)

- Born: Éva Konrád; March 12, 1930; Berettyóújfalu, Hungary
- Died: April 18, 2020 (aged 90); The Bronx, United States
- Occupations: Marine scientist, biologist, botanist, college professor

Eva Konrad Hawkins (March 12, 1930 – April 18, 2020) was a Hungarian-born American biologist and college professor.

== Early life ==
Éva Konrád was raised in Berettyóújfalu, near Debrecen, Hungary, to Jewish parents József Konrád and Róza Klein. Her younger brother was writer György Konrád. The siblings lived in a safe house in Budapest during World War II; their parents survived the Strasshof concentration camp in Austria.

Konrád moved to the United States after the Hungarian Revolution of 1956, after walking to Austria in snow, with a backpack of her belongings. In 1961, she completed doctoral studies in botany at the University of Pennsylvania, with a dissertation on the Callithamnion roseum, a type of red seaweed.

== Career ==
Hawkins taught biology at the University of Pennsylvania, the University of Delaware, Fairleigh Dickinson University, and City College of New York. She was an algae expert on the staff of the New York Zoological Society's Osborn Laboratory of Marine Sciences, supported by a Rockefeller Foundation grant. She designed underwater exhibits for the American Museum of Natural History and the New York Aquarium. She held a research fellowship at the New York Botanical Garden.

Hawkins's research was published in scholarly journals including American Journal of Botany, Journal of Cell Science, Phycologia, Transactions of the American Microscopical Society, Curator: The Museum Journal, Journal of Phycology, and Protoplasma.

== Personal life ==
Eva Konrád married Charles Hawkins in the 1960s. They later divorced. She became a naturalized United States citizen in 1963. She died from COVID-19 at a nursing home in the Bronx on April 18, 2020, aged 90.
