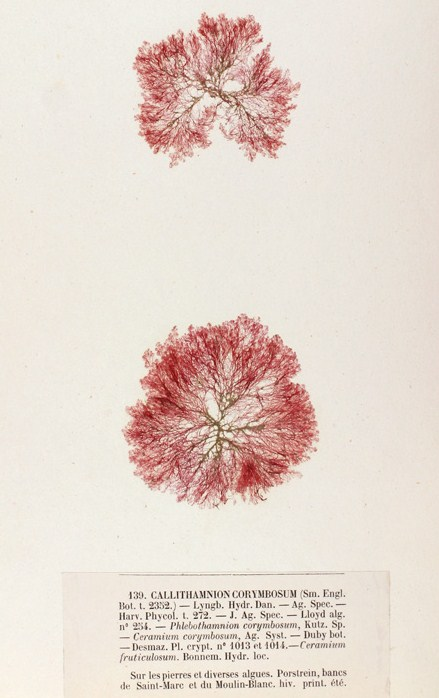
- Callithamnion corymbosum

Scientific classification
- Clade: Archaeplastida
- Division: Rhodophyta
- Class: Florideophyceae
- Order: Ceramiales
- Family: Callithamniaceae
- Genus: Callithamnion; Lyngbye, 1819

Synonyms
- Aristothamnion J.Agardh, 1892; Ceratothamnion J.Agardh, 1892; Dasythamnion Nägeli, 1862; Dorythamnion Nägeli, 1861; Leptothamnion Kützing, 1849; Phlebothamnion Kützing, 1843

= Callithamnion =

Genus of algae

Callithamnion is a genus of algae belonging to the family Callithamniaceae.

The genus was first described by Danish botanist Hans Christian Lyngbye in 1819, and the type species is Callithamnion corymbosum (Smith) Lyngbye.,

The genus has cosmopolitan distribution. Species are found in Europe (including Norway and Great Britain,), Australia, America (including Massachusetts, New York, North Carolina and Georgia), Newfoundland (Canada), Sri Lanka and South Africa.

The genus of Callithamnion has undergone 2 major changes in its history. Carl Nägeli (in 1861) transferred species without alternate branchlets to Antithamnion, Rhodochorton and Acrochaetium. Then Genevieve Feldmann-Mazoyer in 1941 created genus Aglaothamnion for species having uninucleate cells, zig-zag carpogonial branches and lobed groups of carposporangia, and re-circumscribed Callithamnion. Aglaothamnion is now sometimes regarded as a synonym of Callithamnion with insufficient evidence for separate evolutionary lines of development.

== Description ==
Callithamnion species are a marine red alga that is monaxial (having only one axis) with free filaments and the thalli are usually small tufts. They are also erect, up to 10 cm tall, with irregular branching and have multinucleate cells. In most species are gametophytes and sporophytes are found throughout the year, but are usually only fertile in the late summer and autumn.

== Species ==
As accepted by WoRMS and AlgaeBase;

- Callithamnion acutum Kylin, 1925
- Callithamnion aglaothamniodes Itono, 1971
- Callithamnion apiculatum P.L.Crouan & H.M.Crouan, 1878
- Callithamnion apiculatum Meneghini, 1844
- Callithamnion arborescens N.L.Gardner, 1927
- Callithamnion arrawarricum A.J.K.Millar, 1990
- Callithamnion axillare Schousboe
- Callithamnion biseriatum Kylin, 1925
- Callithamnion bisporum N.L.Gardner, 1927
- Callithamnion brachygonum Harvey, 1855
- Callithamnion callithamnioides (A.B.Joly & Ugadim) M.J.Wynne, 2005
- Callithamnion catalinense E.Y.Dawson, 1962
- Callithamnion caulescens (J.Agardh) Womersley, 1998
- Callithamnion circinnatum Womersley, 1998
- Callithamnion codicola Grunow
- Callithamnion colensoi Harvey, 1855
- Callithamnion collabens (Rudolphi) L.McIvor & Maggs, 2002
- Callithamnion compactum E.Y.Dawson, 1962
- Callithamnion confertum Womersley, 1998
- Callithamnion consanguineum Harvey, 1855
- Callithamnion corymbosum (Smith) Lyngbye, 1819
- Callithamnion crispulum Harvey, 1855
- Callithamnion cryptopterum Kützing, 1849
- Callithamnion dasytrichum Montagne
- Callithamnion debile Harvey, 1855
- Callithamnion ecuadoreanum W.R.Taylor, 1945
- Callithamnion ellipticum Montagne, 1841
- Callithamnion elongellum Zanardini, 1846
- Callithamnion epiphyticum W.R.Taylor, 1945
- Callithamnion exiguum Stegenga, Bolton & R.J.Anderson, 1997
- Callithamnion fallax P.L.Crouan & H.M.Crouan, 1867
- Callithamnion flabellatum A.C.Brown & N.Jarman
- Callithamnion flagellare Zanardini
- Callithamnion gaudichaudii C.Agardh, 1828
- Callithamnion gracile J.D.Hooker & Harvey, 1845
- Callithamnion grande J.Agardh, 1842
- Callithamnion granulatum (Ducluzeau) C.Agardh, 1828
- Callithamnion griffithsioides (J.Agardh) H.B.S.Womersley, 1998
- Callithamnion hamelii Nasr, 1941
- Callithamnion hirtellum Zanardini, 1846
- Callithamnion hypneae P.L.Crouan & H.M.Crouan, 1865
- Callithamnion implicatum (Kützing) J.Agardh, 1851
- Callithamnion japonicum Noda, 1971
- Callithamnion kirillianum A.D.Zinova & Zaberzhinskaya, 1968
- Callithamnion korffense A.J.K.Millar, 1990
- Callithamnion lanceolatum (Derbès) Bertoloni
- Callithamnion larcinum Harvey, 1855
- Callithamnion lasioides Reinsch, 1875
- Callithamnion marshallense E.Y.Dawson, 1957
- Callithamnion mildbraedii Pilger, 1920
- Callithamnion montagnei J.D.Hooker, 1847
- Callithamnion mytili Schousboe
- Callithamnion nipponicum Noda, 1971
- Callithamnion octosporum C.Agardh, 1828
- Callithamnion pacificum W.R.Taylor, 1945
- Callithamnion parvulum P.L.Crouan & H.M.Crouan, 1867
- Callithamnion paschale Børgesen, 1924
- Callithamnion pedicellatum C.Agardh, 1828
- Callithamnion pennula Grunow, 1868
- Callithamnion perpusillum P.C.Silva, 1996
- Callithamnion pikeanum Harvey, 1853
- Callithamnion pinastroides
- Callithamnion pinnatum Womersley, 1998
- Callithamnion planum Montagne, 1837
- Callithamnion plumulum
- Callithamnion propebyssoides Womersley, 1998
- Callithamnion puniceum Harvey, 1855
- Callithamnion purpuriferum Harvey, 1838
- Callithamnion pylaisaeanum Montagne
- Callithamnion ramosissimum N.L.Gardner, 1927
- Callithamnion reductum Baardseth, 1941
- Callithamnion rigescens Zanardini
- Callithamnion roseum Harvey, 1849
- Callithamnion rupicola C.L.Anderson, 1894
- Callithamnion rupinicola C.L.Anderson, 1894
- Callithamnion semicorticatum Baardseth, 1941
- Callithamnion shepherdii Womersley, 1998
- Callithamnion soccoriense W.R.Taylor, 1945
- Callithamnion spinuliferum Ardissone, 1888
- Callithamnion stuposum Suhr, 1840
- Callithamnion subsecundum Grunow, 1889
- Callithamnion subverticillatum Zanardini
- Callithamnion tetragonum (Withering) S.F.Gray, 1821
- Callithamnion tetricum (Dillwyn) S.F.Gray, 1821
- Callithamnion unilaterale Zanardini, 1846
- Callithamnion variegatum Suhr, 1840
- Callithamnion veleroae E.Y.Dawson, 1944
- Callithamnion vieillardii Kützing, 1863
- Callithamnion violaceum Harvey, 1859
