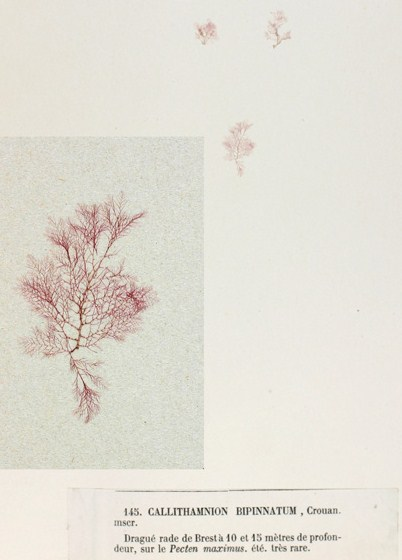
- Aglaothamnion bipinnatum

Scientific classification
- Domain: Eukaryota
- Clade: Archaeplastida
- Division: Rhodophyta
- Class: Florideophyceae
- Order: Ceramiales
- Family: Callithamniaceae
- Genus: Aglaothamnion; Feldmann-Mazoyer

= Aglaothamnion =

Genus of algae

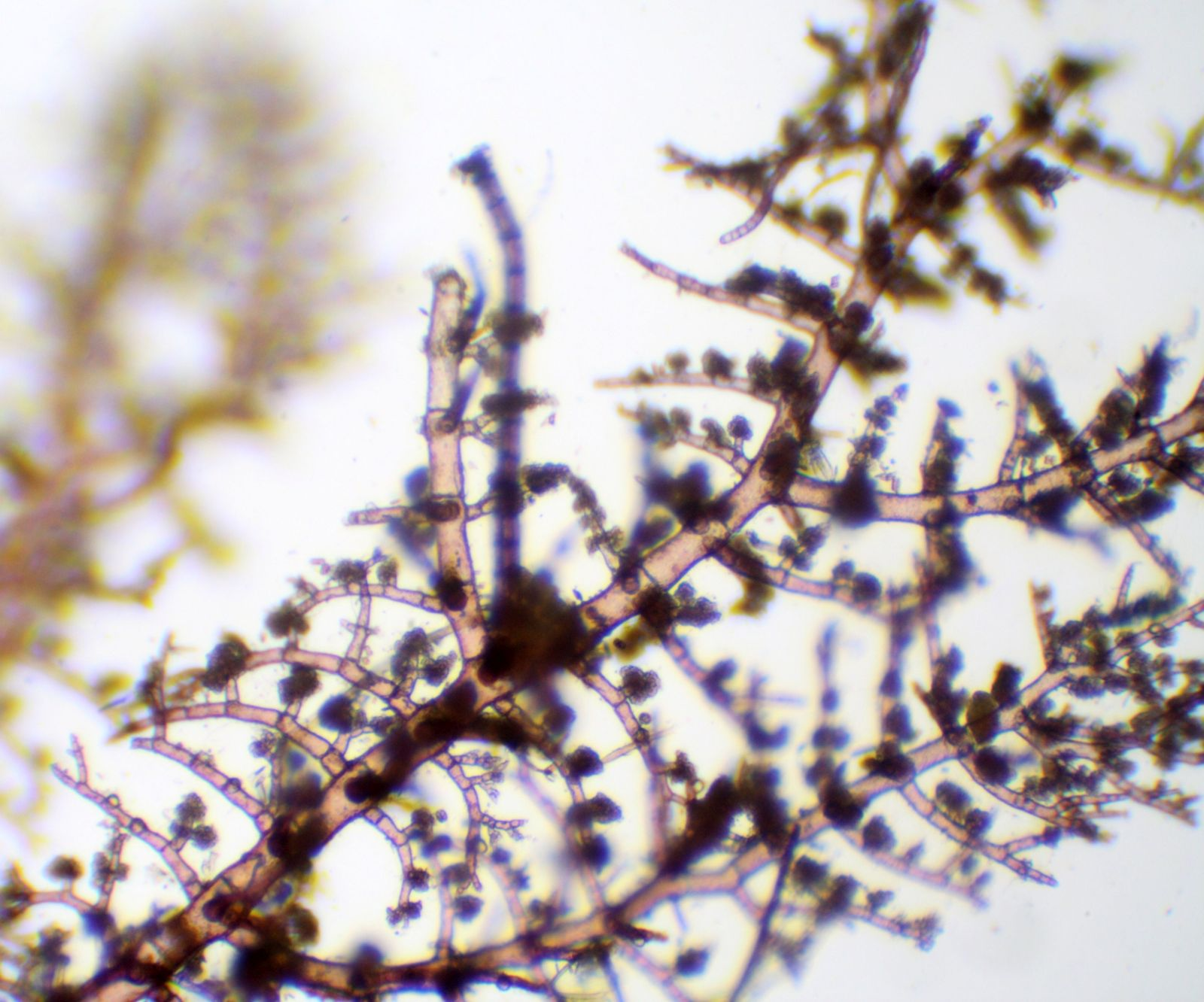
Aglaothamnion tenuissimum

Aglaothamnion is a genus of algae belonging to the family Callithamniaceae.

The genus was first described by Genevieve Feldmann-Mazoyer in 1941, and the type species is Aglaothamnion furcellariae (currently accepted as Aglaothamnion tenuissimum).

The genus has cosmopolitan distribution.

== Species ==
1. Aglaothamnion bipinnatum (P.Crouan & H.Crouan) Feldmann & G.Feldmann
2. Aglaothamnion boergesenii (Aponte & D.L.Ballantine) L'Hardy-Halos & Rueness
3. Aglaothamnion callophyllidicola (Yamada) Boo, I.K.Lee, Rueness & Yoshida
4. Aglaothamnion caudatum (J.Agardh) Feldmann-Mazoyer
5. Aglaothamnion chadefaudii L'Hardy-Halos
6. Aglaothamnion chejuense G.H.Kim & I.K.Lee
7. Aglaothamnion collinsii Aponte, D.L.Ballantine & J.N.Norris
8. Aglaothamnion cordatum (Børgesen) Feldmann-Mazoyer
9. Aglaothamnion diaphanum L'Hardy-Halos & Maggs
10. Aglaothamnion endostolon Huisman
11. Aglaothamnion endovagum (Setchell & N.L.Gardner) I.A.Abbott
12. Aglaothamnion fasciculatum (Harvey) Maggs & L'Hardy-Halos
13. Aglaothamnion feldmanniae Halos
14. Aglaothamnion felipponei (Howe) Aponte, Ballantine & J.N.Norris
15. Aglaothamnion flexibile N.E.Aponte & D.L.Ballantine
16. Aglaothamnion gaillonii (P.Crouan & H.Crouan) Halos
17. Aglaothamnion halliae (Collins) Aponte, D.L.Ballantine & J.N.Norris
18. Aglaothamnion herveyi (M.Howe) N.E.Aponte, D.L.Ballantine, & J.N.Norris
19. Aglaothamnion monopodon Børgesen
20. Aglaothamnion obstipum Cowling, Kraft & J.A.West
21. Aglaothamnion okiense Kajimura
22. Aglaothamnion oosumiense Itono
23. Aglaothamnion priceanum Maggs, Guiry & Rueness
24. Aglaothamnion pseudobyssoides (P.Crouan & H.Crouan) Halos
25. Aglaothamnion rabenhorstii (Kützing) L'Hardy-Halos
26. Aglaothamnion roseum (Roth) Maggs & L'Hardy-Halos
27. Aglaothamnion sarcodiae Børgesen
28. Aglaothamnion tenuissimum (Bonnemaison) Feldmann-Mazoyer
29. Aglaothamnion tripinnatum (C.Agardh) Feldmann-Mazoyer
30. Aglaothamnion uruguayense (W.R.Taylor) N.E.Aponte, D.L.Ballantine & J.N.Norris
