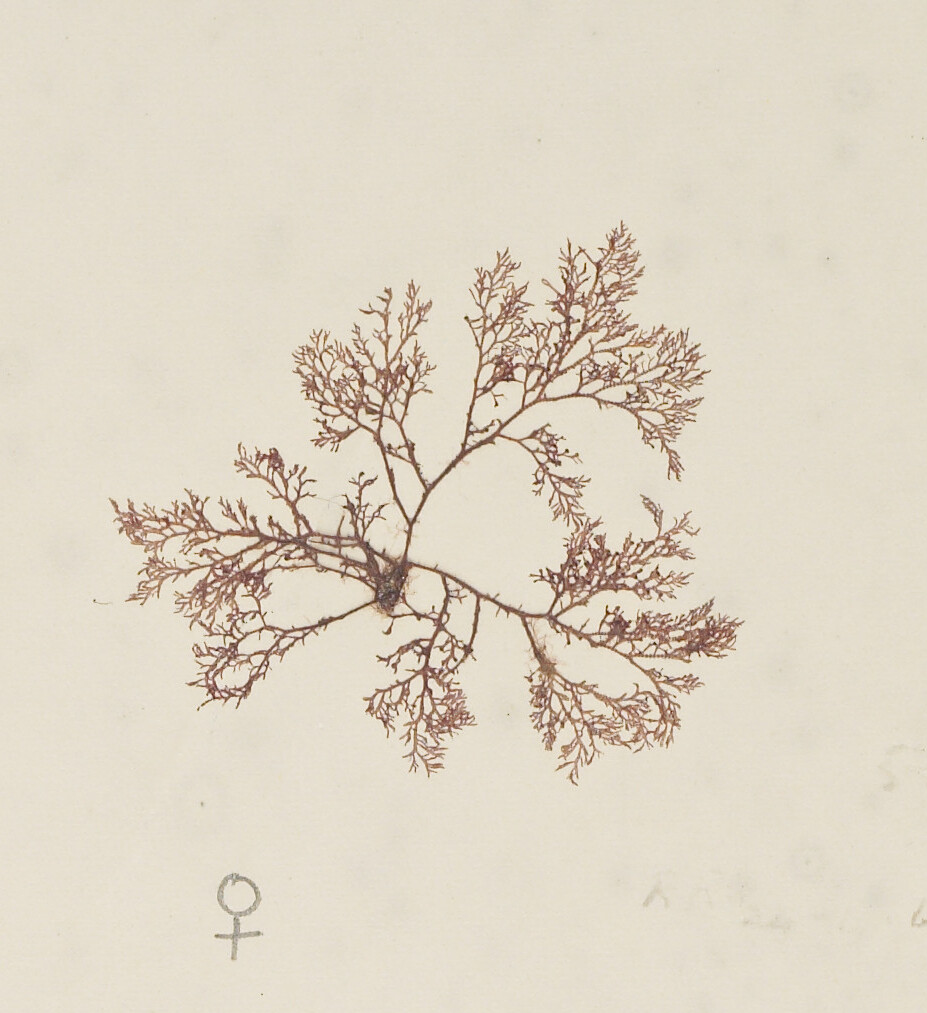

Scientific classification
- Domain: Eukaryota
- Clade: Archaeplastida
- Division: Rhodophyta
- Class: Florideophyceae
- Order: Ceramiales
- Family: Callithamniaceae
- Genus: Crouania
- Species: C. willae

Binomial name
- Crouania willae R.E.Norris, 1986

= Crouania willae =

Species of alga

Crouania willae is a marine red algal species endemic to New Zealand. It was first described in 1986 by Richard Earl Norris.

== Etymology ==
The species epithet, willae, honours Eileen Alice Willa who collected the type specimen (a female plant - CHR 39950) at Ringaringa, on Stewart Island on 24 January 1960 having found it growing on Cystophora.
