= Acrochaetium efflorescens =

Scientific classification
- Clade: Archaeplastida
- Division: Rhodophyta
- Class: Florideophyceae
- Order: Acrochaetiales
- Family: Acrochaetiaceae
- Genus: Acrochaetium
- Species: A. efflorescens

Binomial name
- Acrochaetium efflorescens (J.Agardh) Nageli

Species of alga

Acrochaetium efflorescens is a small marine red alga. It is a small alga with erect filaments and spiral shaped plastids. The base is multicellular. The species shows an alternation of generations with both tetrasporic and gametophytic stages. It is found in the North Atlantic and has been recorded as an epiphyte on Cystoclonium purpureum.
