= Colaconema elegans =

Scientific classification
- Clade: Archaeplastida
- Division: Rhodophyta
- Class: Florideophyceae
- Order: Colaconematales
- Family: Colaconemataceae
- Genus: Colaconema
- Species: C. elegans

Binomial name
- Colaconema elegans (K.M.Drew) I.-K.Hwang & H.-S.Kim, 2011

Synonyms
- Rhodochorton elegans K.M.Drew 1928; Acrochaetium elegans (K.M.Drew) Papenfuss 1945; Audouinella elegans (K.M.Drew) Y.-P.Lee 1987

Species of alga

Colaconema elegans is a species of marine red algae. It is found in Korea, California and Brazil. It is parasitic in the stipe of Eisenia arborea.
