= György Konrád =

Hungarian novelist (1933–2019)

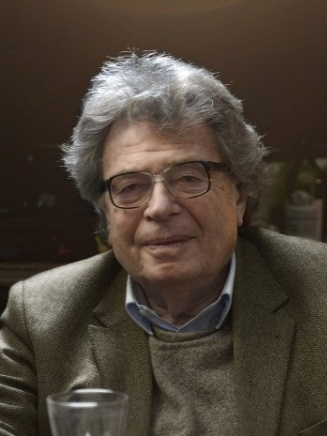
- Born: 2 April 1933; Berettyóújfalu, Hungary
- Died: 13 September 2019 (aged 86); Budapest, Hungary
- Spouses: Vera Varsa (m. 1955; div. 1963); Júlia Lángh; Judit Lakner (m. 1979)
- Children: 5
- Writing career
- Notable works: The Case Worker (A látogató, 1969)

President of PEN International
- In office May 1990 – October 1993
- Preceded by: Per Wästberg
- Succeeded by: Ronald Harwood

György (George) Konrád (2 April 1933 – 13 September 2019) was a Hungarian novelist, pundit, essayist and sociologist known as an advocate of individual freedom.

== Life ==
George Konrad was born in Berettyóújfalu, near Debrecen, into a wealthy Jewish family. His father, József Konrád, ran a hardware business; his mother was Róza Klein, a member of a Nagyvárad Jewish middle-class family. His older sister Éva was born in 1930.

Konrad's parents were arrested and deported to Austria after the German invasion of Hungary, and the two children and two cousins travelled to relatives in Budapest, a day before all Jewish inhabitants of Berettyóújfalu were sent to the ghetto in Nagyvárad, and on to Auschwitz. Most of Konrád's classmates died in Birkenau.

In February 1945, George and his sister went back to Berettyóújfalu, and in June their parents were released from Strasshof concentration camp The Konrád family were the only family among the Jewish inhabitants of Berettyóújfalu to survive intact. Konrad started school in 1946 at the Main Reformed Gimnázium in Debrecen, moving on the following year to 1951, he attended the Madách Gimnázium in Budapest. He left in 1951 to study literature, sociology and psychology at the Lenin Institute of Eötvös Loránd University. In 1950, his father's business and their house at Berettyóújfalu were appropriated by the government.

Konrad completed his university education in the Department of Hungarian literature and language at Eötvös Loránd University in Budapest. In 1956 he was involved in the Hungarian Uprising, and served in the National Guard, made up mostly of university students. Most of his family left for the west, but Konrád decided to remain in Hungary. The story of Konrád's survival as a child is told in his autobiographical novel Departure and Return.

He made his living through ad hoc jobs: he was a tutor, wrote reader reports, translated, and worked as a factory hand. Beginning in the summer of 1959, he secured steady employment as a children's welfare supervisor in Budapest's seventh District. He remained there for seven years, during which time he amassed the experiences that would serve as the basis for his novel The Case Worker (1969). The book drew a vigorous and mixed response: the official criticism was negative, but the book quickly became very popular and sold out in days.

Between 1960 and 1965 Konrad was employed as a reader at the Magyar Helikon publishing house, where he was chief editor of works by Gogol, Turgenev, Tolstoy, Dostoevsky, Babel, and Balzac. In 1965, he joined the Urban Science and Planning Institute, there undertaking research in urban sociology with the sociological research group of the Hungarian Academy of Sciences. He was working closely with urban sociologist Iván Szelényi with whom he wrote a book, On the Sociological Problems of the New Housing Developments (1969), and two extensive works on the management of the country's regional zones, as well as on urbanistic and ecological trends in Hungary.

His experiences as an urbanist provided material for his next novel, The City Builder, in which he radically extended the experiments in language and form that marked The Case Worker. The City Builder was allowed to appear in Hungarian only in censored form from Magvető Publishers in 1977. It was published abroad by Suhrkamp, Seuil, Harcourt Brace Jovanovitch, and Philip Roth's Penguin Series, with a foreword by Carlos Fuentes. Konrád lost his job by order of the political police in July 1973. For half a year he worked as a nurse's aide at the work-therapy-based mental institution at Doba.

Together with Iván Szelényi, Konrád published The Intellectuals on the Road to Class Power in 1974. Shortly after the completion of The Intellectuals (intended for foreign publication), the political police bugged and searched Szelényi's and Konrád's apartments. A significant part of Konrád's diaries were confiscated and the authors were arrested for incitement against the state. They were placed on probation and informed that they would be permitted to emigrate with their families. Szelényi accepted the offer, while Konrád remained in Hungary, choosing internal emigration and all that it entailed. A smuggled manuscript of The Intellectuals on the Road to Class Power was published abroad and it remains on university reading lists.

He was published in Hungarian samizdat and by publishers in the West. Virtually from this period until 1989, Konrád was a forbidden author in Hungary, deprived of all legal income. He made a living from honoraria abroad. His works were placed in restricted sections in libraries. Naturally he was also forbidden to speak on radio or television. When the restriction of travel expired in 1976, Konrád spent a year in Berlin on a DAAD fellowship, and another year in the U.S., on a stipend from his American publisher. During this period, he wrote his novel The Loser.

Between 1977 and 1982, two volumes of Konrád's essays appeared: The Temptation of Autonomy (not translated into English) and Antipolitics. These works called into question the European political status quo. Antipolitics portrayed the Yalta Agreement and the spheres of influence system as the potential cause of a possible Third World War. The book's subtitle was Central-European Meditations, and it was to become one of the voices demanding that region's secession from the Soviet bloc as a requisite for peace in Europe. Konrád was one of the first to predict the imminent disappearance of the Iron Curtain. In 1984, he read his essay Does the Dream of Central Europe Still Exist? in the Schwarzenberg Palace as he received the Herder Prize from the University of Vienna. Critics have compared his essays to the writings of Adam Michnik, Milan Kundera, Václav Havel, Czeslaw Milos and Danilo Kiš.

The years between 1973 and 1989 witnessed the evolution of a dissident political and artistic subculture, independent of official culture. Konrád was one of the determining voices in the democratic opposition. His works appeared in the underground so-called samizdat journals of the opposition. In interviews given to Radio Free Europe, Konrad's ideas reached a wider Hungarian audience. Beginning in September 1982, he was a year-long guest at the Wissenschaft-skolleg zu Berlin; the following year he received a fellowship at the New York Institute for the Humanities. Over the four years that followed, Konrád wrote A Feast in the Garden (Hungarian version 1985). Now released from the official prohibition against publication, he sent the manuscript to the Magvető publishing house in Hungary.

In 1986 Konrad received an invitation from the Jerusalem Literary Fund, spending a month in that city. This was the period when Konrád primarily penned those essays and diary entries that would be collected for the volume The Invisible Voice (Hungarian version 1997). Konrád returned to Israel in 1992 and 1996. During his first visit he gave a long biographical interview for the University of Jerusalem, while on the second, he gave a lecture entitled "Judaism’s Three Paths" at the Ben Gurion University in Beer Sheva. In 1988 he taught world literature at Colorado College in Colorado Springs.

In the first years after the fall of the old regime, beginning in 1989, Konrád took an active part in public life in Hungary, and was one of the thinkers who paved the way for the transition to democracy. He was a founding member of the Alliance of Free Democrats (SZDSZ), and one of the founders and spokespeople for the Democratic Charter. He made frequent appearances in both the print and electronic media. In the spring of 1990 Konrád was elected President of PEN International, holding this office for the full term until 1993. He made strenuous efforts on behalf of imprisoned and persecuted writers and called the writers of disintegrating nations together to roundtable conferences in the interest of peace.

Between 1997 and 2003, Konrád was twice elected President of the Academy of Arts, Berlin. As the first foreigner to hold that post, Konrád was an effective contributor to the intellectual rapprochement between the East and West of Europe, and did much to introduce writers and other creative figures from Central Europe, and particularly from Hungary, to the West. His efforts were greeted by an appreciative German public. During his presidency, he received the Internationale Karlspreis zu Aachen (2001) and the Cross of the Order of Merit of the Federal Republic of Germany (2003).

Though Konrád frequently portrayed his Berettyóúfalu childhood in his novels, and particularly in The Feast in the Garden, he attempted to present this period in a more precise documentary form in two books, Departure and Return (2001) and Up on the Hill During a Solar Eclipse (2003). The first of these books treats a single year – 1944–45 – while the second covers fifty, after beginning with a reflection on the final years of the twentieth century, more precisely the morning solar eclipse of 1999, experienced from the peak of St. György Hill. These books were published separately in Europe, and together in New York as A Guest in My Own Country (2007).

The year 2006 saw the publication of his volume Figures of Wonder, subtitled "Portraits and Snapshots". These portraits are modeled primarily on friends, some still living – descriptions that constitute a continuation of the series presented by Konrád in his book The Writer and the City (2004) together with longer essays. His books The Rooster’s Sorrow (2005), Pendulum (2008), The Chimes (2009), and The Visitor’s Book (2013) present his philosophy of life with a near-poetic density.

Konrád was married three times. In 1955 he married Vera Varsa, with whom he lived until 1963, then married Júlia Lángh, with whom he had two children, Anna Dóra in 1965, and Miklós István in 1967. From 1979, Konrád lived with Judith Lakner, his third wife, and together they had three children, Áron (1986), József (1987), and Zsuzsanna (1994).

== Death ==
György Konrád died at his home in Budapest. His family stated that he had been gravely ill.

== Awards and honors ==
- Herder Prize (1983)
- Charles Veillon Prize (1985)
- Manes-Sperber Prize (1990)
- Kossuth Prize (1990)
- Friedenspreis des Deutschen Buchhandels (1991)
- Goethe Medal (2000)
- Internationaler Karlspreis zu Aachen (2001)
- Franz Werfel Human Rights Award (2007)
- National Jewish Book Award in the memoir category (2008)

György Konrád received the highest state distinctions awarded by France, Hungary, and Germany: Officier de l’Ordre national de la Légion d’Honneur (1996); the Hungarian Republic Legion of Honor Middle Cross with Star (2003); Das Grosse Verdienstkreuz der Bundesrepublik Deutschland (2003). He held honorary doctorates from the University of Antwerp (1990) and the University of Novi Sad (2003). He was an honorary citizen of Berettyóújfalu (2003) and of Budapest (2004).

== Partial list of works ==
=== Fiction ===
- A látogató (1969). The Case Worker, trans. Paul Aston (Harcourt Brace Jovanovich, 1974; Penguin, 1987)
- A városalapító (1977). The City Builder, trans. Ivan Sanders (Harcourt Brace Jovanovich, 1977; Penguin, 1987; Dalkey Archive, 2007)
- A cinkos (1982). The Loser, trans. Ivan Sanders (Harcourt Brace Jovanovich, 1982)
- Kerti mulatság (1987). A Feast in the Garden, trans. Imre Goldstein (Harcourt Brace Jovanovich, 1992)
- Kőóra (1994). Stonedial, trans. Ivan Sanders (Harcourt, 2000)

=== Non-fiction ===
- Az értelmiség útja az osztályhatalomhoz with Iván Szelényi (1978). The Intellectuals on the Road to Class Power (Harvester Press, 1979)
- Antipolitika (1982). Antipolitics: An Essay (Harcourt Brace Jovanovich, 1984)
- Az újjászületés melankóliája (1991). The Melancholy of Rebirth: Essays from Post-Communist Central Europe, 1989-1994 (Harcourt Brace, 1995)
- A jugoszláviai háború (és ami utána jöhet) (1999)
- Jugoslovenski rat (i ono što posle može da usledi) (2000)
- Elutazás és Hazatérés (2001). Departure and Return, in A Guest in My Own Country (2007)
- Fenn a hegyen napfogyatkozáskor (2003). Up on the Hill During a Solar Eclipse, in A Guest in My Own Country (2007)

=== Compilations in English ===
- The Invisible Voice: Meditations on Jewish Themes, trans. Peter Reich (Harcourt, 2000)
- A Guest in My Own Country: A Hungarian Life, trans. Jim Tucker, ed. Michael Henry Heim (Other Press, 2007). Collects Elutazás és Hazatérés and Fenn a hegyen napfogyatkozáskor.

=== Articles ===
- “The Intelligentsia and Social Structure”. Telos 38 (Winter 1978–79). New York: Telos Press.

Non-profit organization positions
Preceded by Per Wästberg	International President of PEN International; 1990–1993	Succeeded by Ronald Harwood
