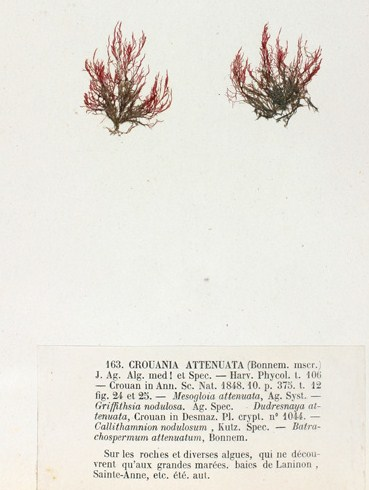
- Crouania attenuata

Scientific classification
- Clade: Archaeplastida
- Division: Rhodophyta
- Class: Florideophyceae
- Order: Ceramiales
- Family: Callithamniaceae
- Genus: Crouania; J.Agardh, 1842

Type species
- Crouania attenuata (C.Agardh) J.Agardh

Species
- See text

= Crouania =

Genus of algae

Crouania is a genus of red algae (Rhodophyta) in the Callithamniaceae family. The name of the genus honours the French born Crouan brothers, Pierre-Louis Crouan (1798 - 1871) and Hippolyte-Marie Crouan (1802 - 1871). It was first described by Jacob Georg Agardh in 1842, and the type species is Crouania attenuata.

== Species list ==
According to WoRMS:

- Crouania attenuata (C.Agardh) J.Agardh (type species)
- Crouania boergesenii B.Subramanian
- Crouania brunyana Wollaston
- Crouania capricornica Saenger & Wollaston
- Crouania dampieriana Huisman, 2018
- Crouania destriana Wollaston
- Crouania eliseae C.W.Schneider
- Crouania francescoi Cormaci, G.Furnari & Scammacca
- Crouania ischiana (Funk) C.F.Boudouresque & M.M.Perret-Boudouresque
- Crouania iyengarii B.Subramanian
- Crouania mageshimensis Itono
- Crouania mayae Mateo-Cid, Mendoza-González & Searles
- Crouania mucosa Wollaston
- Crouania pleonospora W.R.Taylor
- Crouania pumila B.Gavio, V.P.Reyes-Gómez & M.J.Wynne, 2013
- Crouania robbii Wollaston
- Crouania shepleyana Wollaston
- Crouania willae R.E.Norris

According to Interim Register of Marine and Nonmarine Genera:

- Crouania attenuata (C.Agardh) J.Agardh, 1842
- Crouania boergesenii B.Subramanian, 1985
- Crouania brunyana Wollaston, 1998
- Crouania capricornica Saenger & Wollaston, 1982
- Crouania destriana Wollaston, 1968
- Crouania divaricata Okamura, 1902
- Crouania elisiae C.W.Schneider, 2004
- Crouania francescoi Cormaci, G.Furnari & Scammacca, 1978
- Crouania ischiana (Funk) C.F.Boudouresque & M.M.Perret-Boudouresque, 1987
- Crouania iyengarii B.Subramanian, 1985
- Crouania mageshimensis Itono, 1977
- Crouania mayae Mateo-Cid, Mendoza-González & Searles, 2002
- Crouania minutissima Yamada, 1944
- Crouania mucosa Wollaston, 1968
- Crouania pleonospora W.R.Taylor, 1928
- Crouania robbii Wollaston, 1998
- Crouania shepleyana Wollaston, 1968
- Crouania willae R.E.Norris, 1986
