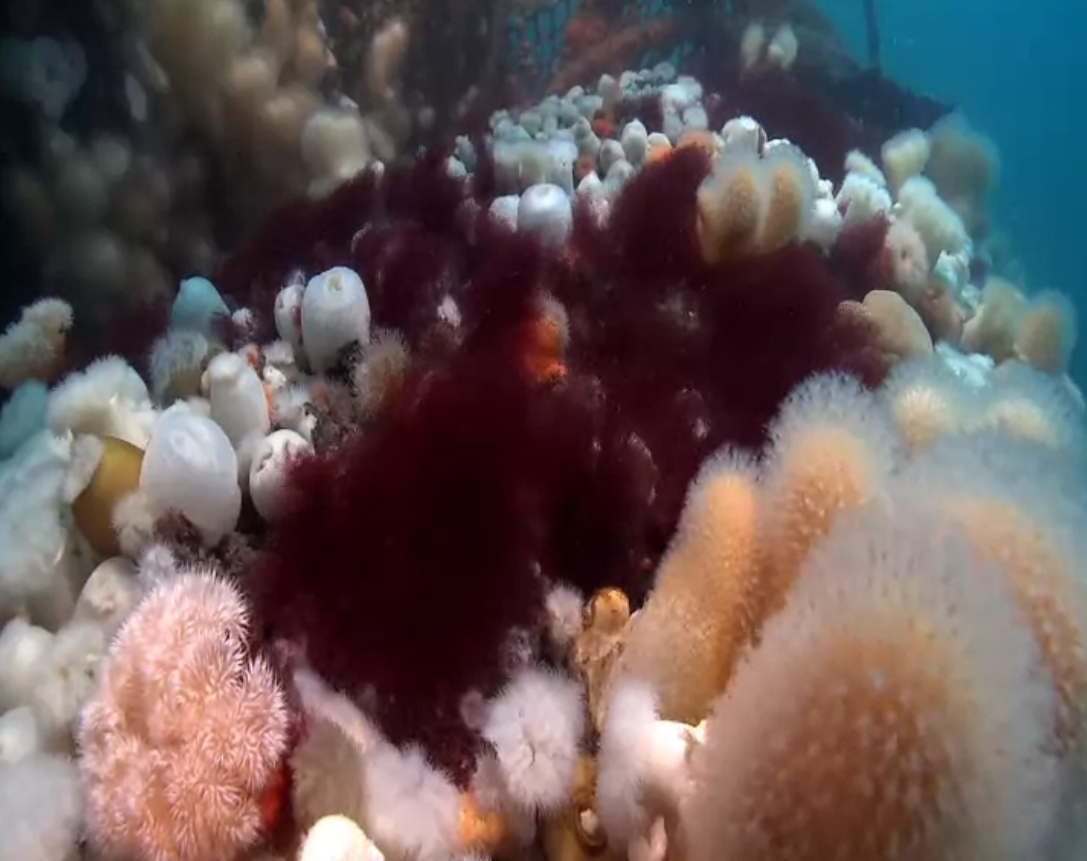
- Gaillona rosea in the Netherlands

Scientific classification
- Domain: Eukaryota
- Clade: Archaeplastida
- Division: Rhodophyta
- Class: Florideophyceae
- Order: Ceramiales
- Family: Callithamniaceae
- Genus: Gaillona; Bonnemaison

= Gaillona =

Genus of algae

Gaillona is a genus of algae belonging to the family Callithamniaceae.

== Species ==
As of March 2026, four species are accepted:

- Gaillona gallica (Nägeli) Athanasiadis
- Gaillona hookeri (Dillwyn) Athanasiadis
- Gaillona rosea (Roth) Athanasiadis
- Gaillona seposita (Gunnerus) Athanasiadis
