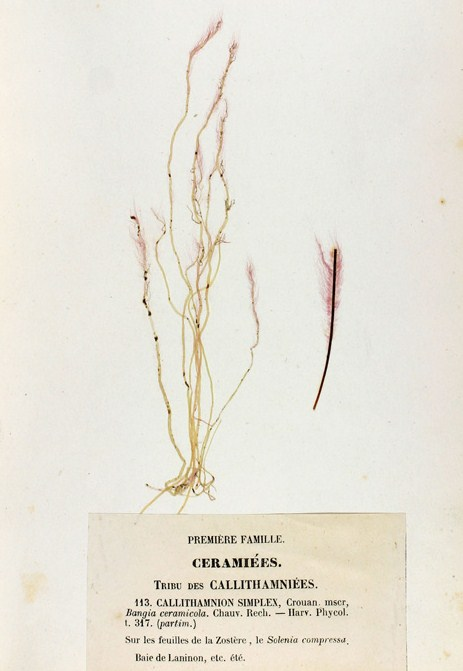
- Erythrotrichia carnea

Scientific classification
- Clade: Archaeplastida
- Division: Rhodophyta
- Class: Compsopogonophyceae
- Order: Erythropeltidales
- Family: Erythrotrichiaceae
- Genus: Erythrotrichia; Areschoug, 1850

Species
- see text

= Erythrotrichia =

Genus of algae

Erythrotrichia is a red algae genus in the family Erythrotrichiaceae. In Iceland, E. carnea is red listed as a vulnerable species (VU).

== Species ==
Erythrotrichia contains 32 species.

- Erythrotrichia ascendens E.Y.Dawson, 1953
- Erythrotrichia bangioides Levring, 1955
- Erythrotrichia bertholdii Batters, 1900
- Erythrotrichia biseriata Tanaka, 1944
- Erythrotrichia carnea (Dillwyn) J.Agardh, 1883
- Erythrotrichia elongata Lami, 1938
- Erythrotrichia foliiformis G.R.South & N.M.Adams, 1976
- Erythrotrichia hunterae N.L.Gardner, 1936
- Erythrotrichia incrassata T. Tanaka, 1944
- Erythrotrichia investiens (Zanardini) Bornet, 1892
- Erythrotrichia kylinii N.L.Gardner, 1927
- Erythrotrichia longistipitata J.A.West, Loiseaux de Goër & Zuccarello, 2012
- Erythrotrichia minuta B.F.Zheng & J.Li
- Erythrotrichia parietalis T. Tanaka, 1952
- Erythrotrichia parksii N.L.Gardner, 1927
- Erythrotrichia platyphylla Stegenga, Engledow, Bolton & Anderson, 2001
- Erythrotrichia polymorpha M.A.Howe, 1914
- Erythrotrichia porphyroide N.L.Gardner, 1927
- Erythrotrichia propagulosa B.F.Zheng & J.Li
- Erythrotrichia ramulosa B.F.Zheng & J.Li
- Erythrotrichia reflexa (P.L.Crouan & H.M.Crouan) Thuret ex De Toni, 1897
- Erythrotrichia regularis Noda, 1971
- Erythrotrichia rhizoidea Cleland, 1917
- Erythrotrichia rosea P.J.L.Dangeard, 1968
- Erythrotrichia sargassicola Noda, 1970
- Erythrotrichia scalaris P.J.L.Dangeard, 1968
- Erythrotrichia simplex P.J.L.Dangeard, 1968
- Erythrotrichia simplex B.F.Zheng & J.Li
- Erythrotrichia tetraseriata N.L.Gardner, 1927
- Erythrotrichia tristanensis Baardseth, 1941
- Erythrotrichia vexillaris (Montagne) G.Hamel, 1929
- Erythrotrichia welwitschii (Ruprecht) Batters, 1902
