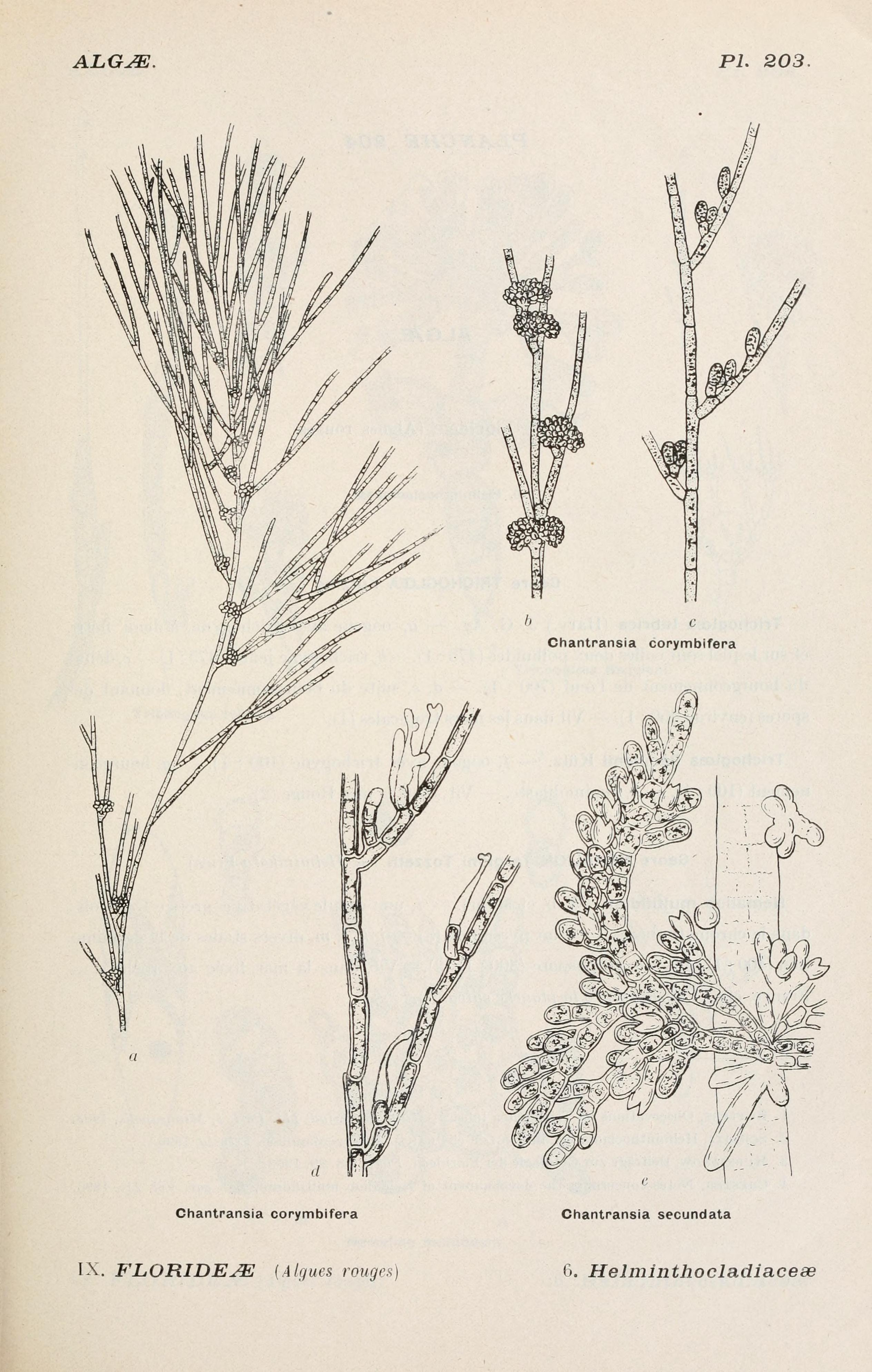
- Acrochaetium corymbiferum

Scientific classification
- Clade: Archaeplastida
- Division: Rhodophyta
- Class: Florideophyceae
- Order: Acrochaetiales
- Family: Acrochaetiaceae
- Genus: Acrochaetium; Nägeli, 1858

Species
- Many, including: Acrochaetium corymbiferum; Acrochaetium efflorescens

= Acrochaetium =

Genus of algae

Acrochaetium is a genus of marine red alga.

Names brought to synonymy

Acrochaetium elegans (K.M.Drew) Papenfuss 1945 is a synonym of Colaconema elegans (K.M.Drew) I.-K.Hwang & H.-S.Kim.
