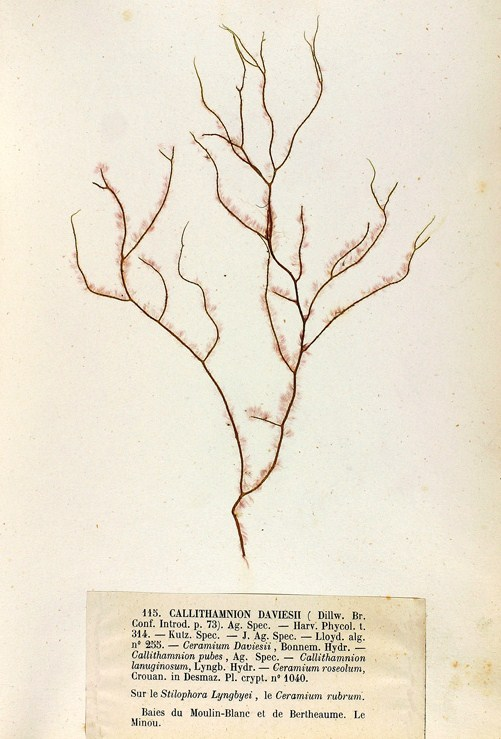
- Colaconema daviesii

Scientific classification
- Clade: Archaeplastida
- Division: Rhodophyta
- Class: Florideophyceae
- Subclass: Nemaliophycidae
- Order: Colaconematales; J.T. Harper & G.W. Saunders, 2002
- Family: Colaconemataceae; J.T. Harper & G.W. Saunders, 2002
- Genus: Colaconema; Batters, 1896

= Colaconema =

Genus of algae

Colaconema is a genus of marine red algae. It is the only genus in the family Colaconemataceae J.T.Harper & G.W.Saunders which is the only family in Order Colaconematales J.T.Harper & G.W.Saunders.

The genus has cosmopolitan distribution.

== Species ==
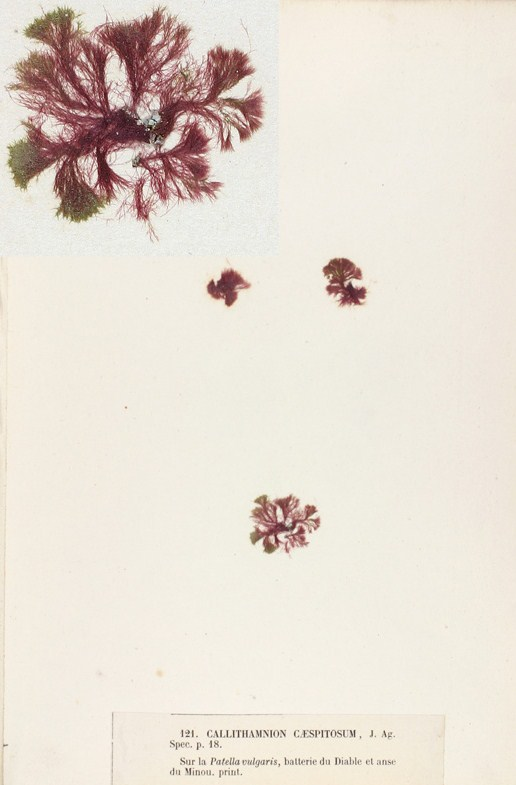
Colaconema caespitosum

As accepted by AlgaeBase;

- Colaconema americanum C.-C.Jao, 1936
- Colaconema amphiroae (K.M.Drew) P.W.Gabrielson, 2000
- Colaconema asparagopsidis Chemin, 1927
- Colaconema asparagopsis Chemin, 1926
- Colaconema attenuatum (Rosenvinge) R.Nielsen, 1994
- Colaconema basiramosum M.J.Wynne & C.W.Schneider, 2008
- Colaconema bisporum (Børgesen) I.-K.Hwang & H.-S.Kim, 2011
- Colaconema bonnemaisoniae Batters, 1896
- Colaconema caespitosum (J.Agardh) Jackelman, Stegenga & J.J.Bolton, 1991
- Colaconema chylocladiae Batters, 1896
- Colaconema coccinea (K.M.Drew) P.W.Gabrielson, 2004
- Colaconema codicola (Børgesen) H.Stegenga, J.J.Bolton & R.J.Anderson, 1997
- Colaconema codii (G.Hamel) I.-K.Hwang & H.-S.Kim, 2011
- Colaconema comptum (Børgesen) I.-K.Hwang & H.-S.Kim, 2011
- Colaconema conchicola Lami, 1939
- Colaconema dasyae (F.S.Collins) Stegenga, I.Mol, Prud'homme van Reine & Lokhorst, 1997
- Colaconema daviesii (Dillwyn) Stegenga, 1985
- Colaconema desmarestiae (Kylin) P.W.Gabrielson, 2004
- Colaconema dictyotae (Collins) I.-K.Hwang & H.-S.Kim, 2011
- Colaconema elegans (K.M.Drew) I.-K.Hwang & H.-S.Kim, 2011
- Colaconema emergens (Rosenvinge) R.Nielsen, 1994
- Colaconema endophyticum (Batters) J.T.Harper & G.W.Saunders, 2002
- Colaconema erythrophyllum (C.C.Jao) P.W.Gabrielson, 2006
- Colaconema furcatum Tanaka, 1944
- Colaconema garbaryi P.W.Gabrielson, 2004
- Colaconema gracile (Børgesen) Ateweberhan & Prud'homme van Reine, 2005
- Colaconema gymnogongri (K.M.Drew) P.W.Gabrielson, 2004
- Colaconema gynandrum (Rosenvinge) R.Nielsen, 1994
- Colaconema hallandicum (Kylin) Afonso-Carillo, Sansón, Sangil & Díaz-Villa, 2007
- Colaconema hancockii (E.Y.Dawson) J.N.Norris, 2014
- Colaconema hyalosiphoniae (Nakamura) I.-K.Hwang & H.-S.Kim, 2011
- Colaconema hypneae (Børgesen) A.A.Santos & C.W.N.Moura, 2010
- Colaconema infestans (M.A.Howe & Hoyt) Woelkerling, 1973
- Colaconema interpositum (Heydrich) H.Stegenga, J.J.Bolton & R.J.Anderson, 1997
- Colaconema macounii (F.S.Collins) P.W.Gabrielson, 2000
- Colaconema membranacea (Magnus) Woelkerling, 1973
- Colaconema monorhiza H.Stegenga, 1985
- Colaconema naumannii (Askenasy) Prud'homme van Reine, R.J.Haroun & L.B.T.Kostermans, 2005
- Colaconema nemalionis (De Notaris ex L.Dufour) Stegenga, 1985
- Colaconema ophioglossum (Schneider) Afonso-Carrillo, Sansón & Sangil, 2003
- Colaconema panduripodium H.Stegenga, J.J.Bolton & R.J.Anderson, 1997
- Colaconema pectinatum (Kylin) J.T.Harper & G.W.Saunders, 2002
- Colaconema proskaueri (J.A.West) P.W.Gabrielson, 2000
- Colaconema punctatum (E.Y.Dawson) J.N.Norris, 2014
- Colaconema rhizoideum (K.M.Drew) P.W.Gabrielson, 2000
- Colaconema sarconemae A.A.Aleem, 1980
- Colaconema scinaiae (E.Y.Dawson) J.N.Norris, 2014
- Colaconema sinicola (E.Y.Dawson) J.N.Norris, 2014
- Colaconema strictum (Rosenvinge) R.Nielsen, 1994
- Colaconema tetrasporum (Garbary & Rueness) Athanasiadis, 1996
- Colaconema thuretii (Bornet) P.W.Gabrielson, 2000
- Colaconema variabile (K.M.Drew) J.N.Norris, 2014

== Other sources ==
- Kylin, H. (1956). Die Gattungen der Rhodophyceen. pp. i-xv, 1–673, 458 figs. Lund: C.W.K. Gleerups.
