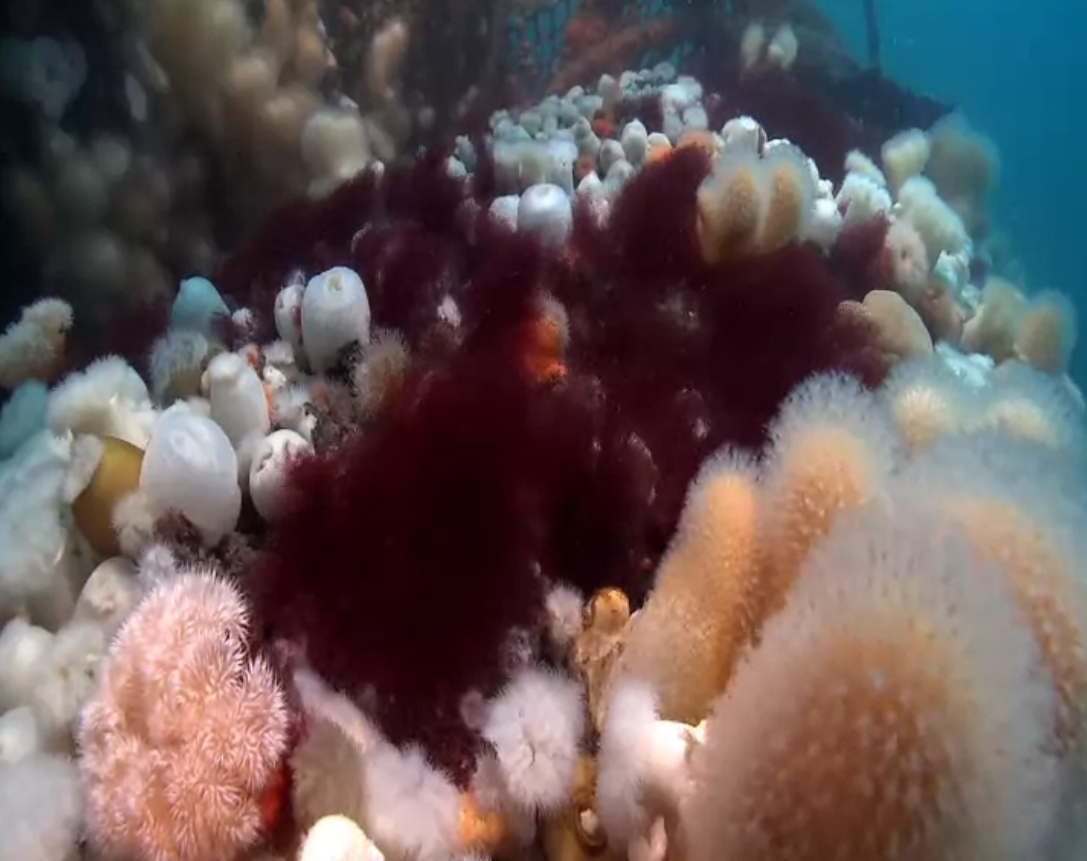
- In the Netherlands

Scientific classification
- Domain: Eukaryota
- Clade: Archaeplastida
- Division: Rhodophyta
- Class: Florideophyceae
- Order: Ceramiales
- Family: Callithamniaceae
- Genus: Gaillona
- Species: G. rosea

Binomial name
- Gaillona rosea (Roth) Athanasiadis, 2016

Synonyms
- Aglaothamnion roseum Maggs & L'Hardy-Halos 1993; Callithamnion octosporum C.Agardh 1828; Callithamnion roseum (Roth) Lyngbye 1819; Ceramium roseum Roth 1798; Conferva rosea (Roth) Smith 1802

= Gaillona rosea =

Species of alga

Gaillona rosea is a species of red algae in the order Ceramiales. The species was previously classified under several genera, including Callithamnion as Callithamnion roseum.

== Description ==
Gaillona rosea is a delicate, filamentous red alga that forms fine, branched structures. It typically grows attached to substrates such as rocks, shells, or other algae.

== Distribution ==
Gaillona rosea is found in marine environments across Europe, islands of the Atlantic Ocean, the western Atlantic, and parts of Africa.

== Taxonomy ==
The species was originally described as Ceramium roseum by Roth in 1798. It has since been placed in several genera, including Conferva, Callithamnion, and Aglaothamnion, before being reassigned to the genus Gaillona by Athanasiadis in 2016.
