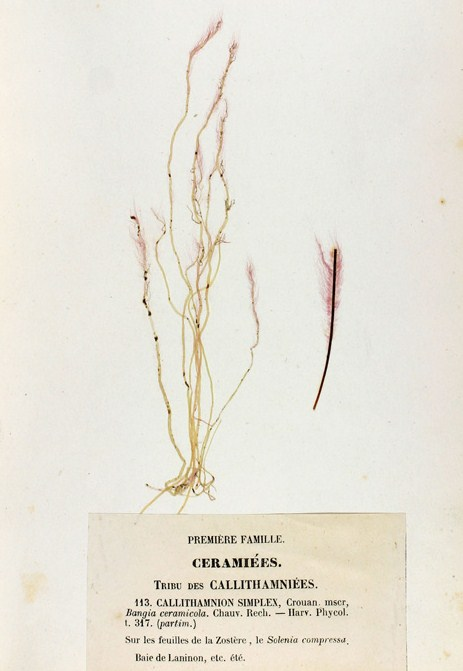
- Erythrotrichia carnea

Scientific classification
- Clade: Archaeplastida
- Division: Rhodophyta
- Class: Compsopogonophyceae
- Order: Erythropeltidales
- Family: Erythrotrichiaceae; G.M.Smith, 1933

Genera
- Chlidophyllon W.A.Nelson, 2003; Erythrocladia Rosenvinge, 1909; Erythropeltis F. Schmitz, 1896; Erythrotrichia Areschoug, 1850; Porphyropsis Rosenvinge, 1909; Porphyrostromium Trevisan de Saint-Léon, 1848; Pyrophyllon W.A.Nelson, 2003; Sahlingia P. Kornmann, 1989; Smithora G. J. Hollenberg, 1959; Ceramicola Ørsted, 1844

= Erythrotrichiaceae =

Family of algae

Erythrotrichiaceae is a red algae family in the order Erythropeltidales.

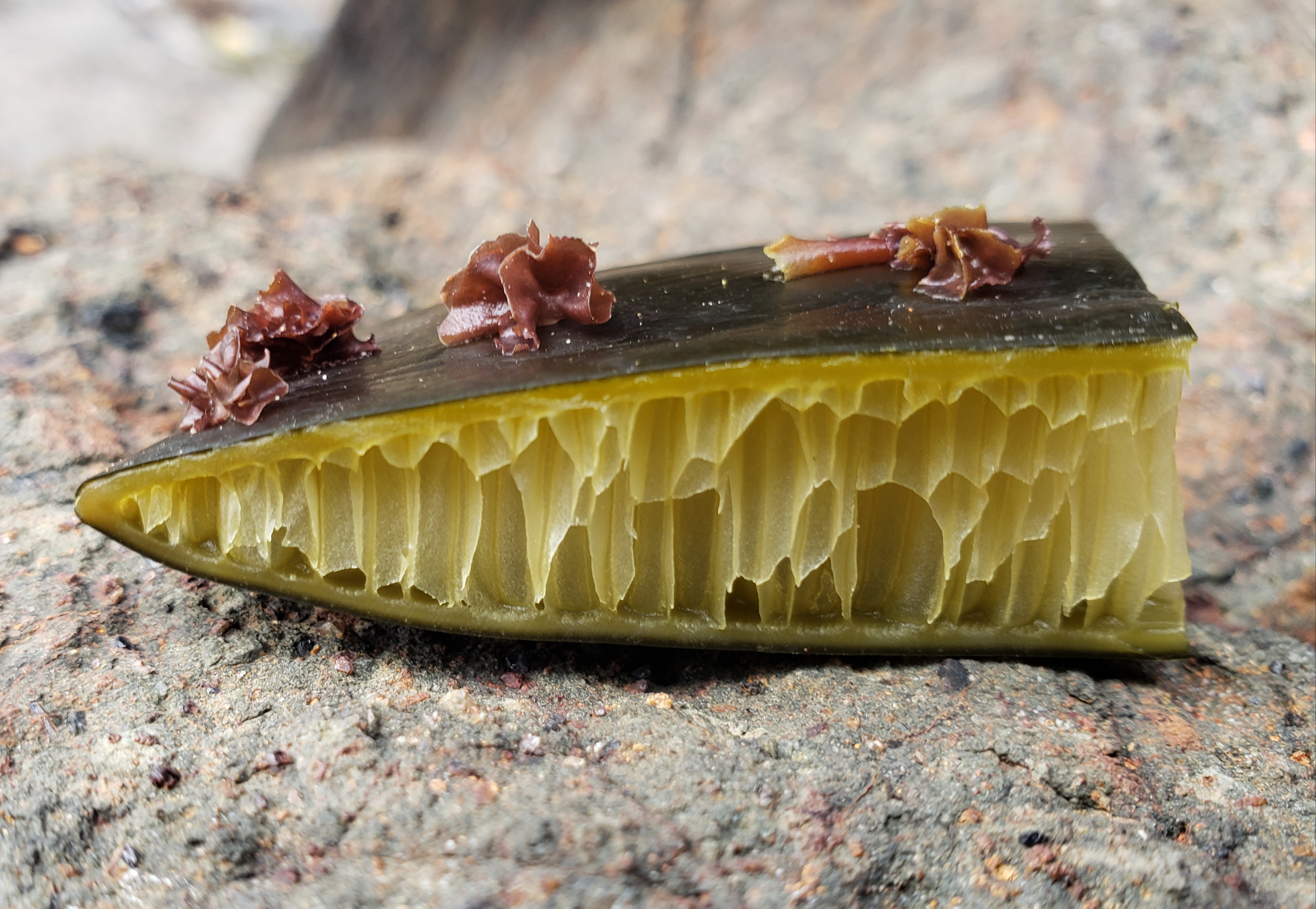
Cross-section of a Durvillaea antarctica frond, showing Pyrophyllon subtumens growing on the outer surface
