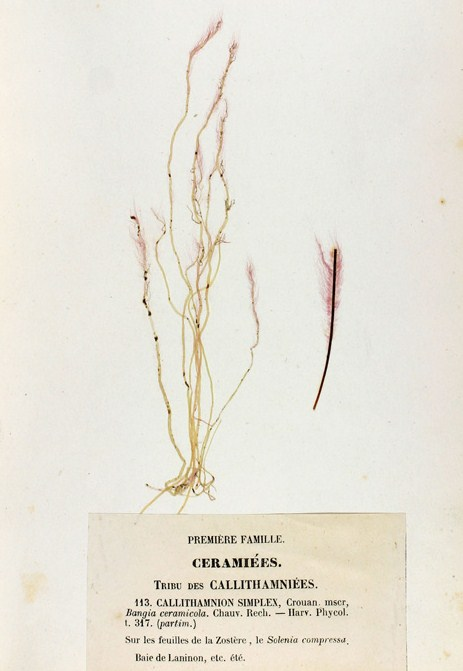
- Erythrotrichia carnea

Scientific classification
- Clade: Archaeplastida
- Division: Rhodophyta
- Class: Compsopogonophyceae
- Order: Erythropeltidales; Garbary, G.I.Hansen & Scagel, 1980

Families
- Erythropeltidaceae; Erythrotrichiaceae G.M.Smith

= Erythropeltidales =

Order of algae

Erythropeltidales is a red algae order in the class Compsopogonophyceae.

== Species ==
- Erythropeltidales
  - Erythropeltidaceae
  - Erythrotrichiaceae
    - Chlidophyllon
    - Erythrocladia
    - Erythropeltis
    - Erythrotrichia
    - Porphyropsis
    - Porphyrostromium
    - Pyrophyllon
    - Sahlingia
    - Smithora
