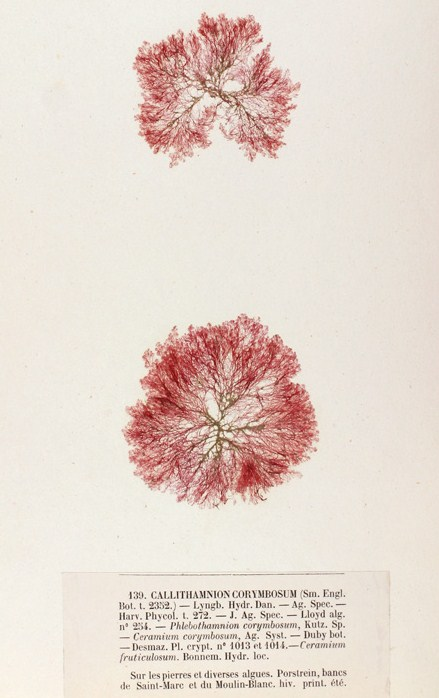
- Callithamnion corymbosum

Scientific classification
- Domain: Eukaryota
- Clade: Archaeplastida
- Division: Rhodophyta
- Class: Florideophyceae
- Order: Ceramiales
- Family: Callithamniaceae; Kützing, 1843

Genera
- See text

= Callithamniaceae =

Family of algae

Callithamniaceae is a family of red algae (Rhodophyta) in the order Ceramiales. The family was first described by Friedrich Traugott Kützing in 1843.

== Description ==
Algae in the family Callithamniaceae have filamentous fronds with branches arranged in two rows on opposite sides of a stem and in the same plane, or radially or in whorls. In the female gametophytes, the procarps are four-celled and there are no sterile cells.

== List of genera ==
According to the Interim Register of Marine and Nonmarine Genera, and AlgaeBase (amount of species per genus):

- Tribe Callithamnieae J.Agardh
  - Aglaothamnion G. Feldman-Mazoyer, 1941 - 30 spp.
  - Aristoptilon M.H. Hommersand & W.A. Nelson in M.H. Hommersand et al., 2006 - 1 sp.
  - Aristothamnion J.Agardh, 1892 - 2 spp.
  - Callithamnion Lyngbye, 1819 - 74 spp.
  - Carpothamnion Kützing, 1849 - 1 sp.
  - Diapse Kylin, 1956 - 1 sp.
  - Falklandiella Kylin, 1956 - 1 sp.
  - Gaillona Bonnemaison, 1828 - 4 spp.
  - Georgiella Kylin, 1956 - 1 sp.
  - Heteroptilon M.H. Hommersand in M.H. Hommersand, D.W. Freshwater, J. López-Bautista & S. Fredericq, 2006 - 2 spp.
  - Hirsutithallia E.M. Wollaston & H.B.S. Womersley in H.B.S. Womersley, 1998 - 6 spp.
  - Nwynea R.B. Searles in R.B. Searles & C.W. Schneider, 1989 - 1 sp.
  - Pseudospora Schiffner, 1931 - 1 sp.
- Tribe Crouanieae F.Schmitz & Hauptfleisch (39)
  - Crouania J.Agardh, 1842 - 19 spp.
  - Crouanophycus A. Athanasiadis, 1998 - 2 spp.
  - Euptilocladia Wollaston, 1968 - 3 spp.
  - Gattya Harvey, 1855 - 2 spp.
  - Gulsonia Harvey, 1855 - 3 spp.
  - Ptilocladia Sonder, 1845 - 10 spp.
- Tribe Euptiloteae (15)
  - Euptilota (Kützing) Kützing, 1849 - 5 spp.
  - Sciurothamnion De Clerck & Kraft, 2002 1 sp.
  - Seirospora Harvey, 1846 - 9 spp.
- Tribe Gymnothamnieae M.Kajimura (3)
  - Gymnothamnion J.Agardh, 1892 - 3 spp.
- Tribe Perithamnieae Athanasiadis (5)
  - Perithamnion J.Agardh, 1892 - 2 spp.
  - Scageliopsis E.M.Wollaston, 1981 - 3 spp.
- Tribe Rhodocallideae M.H.Hommersand, S.M.Wilson, & G.T.Kraft (3)
  - Psilothallia F.Schmitz, 1896 - 2 spp.
  - Rhodocallis Kützing, 1847 - 1 sp.
- Tribe Spyridieae F.Schmitz & Hauptfleisch (17)
  - Spyridia Harvey, 1833 - 17 spp.
