= Freshwater aquarium algae =

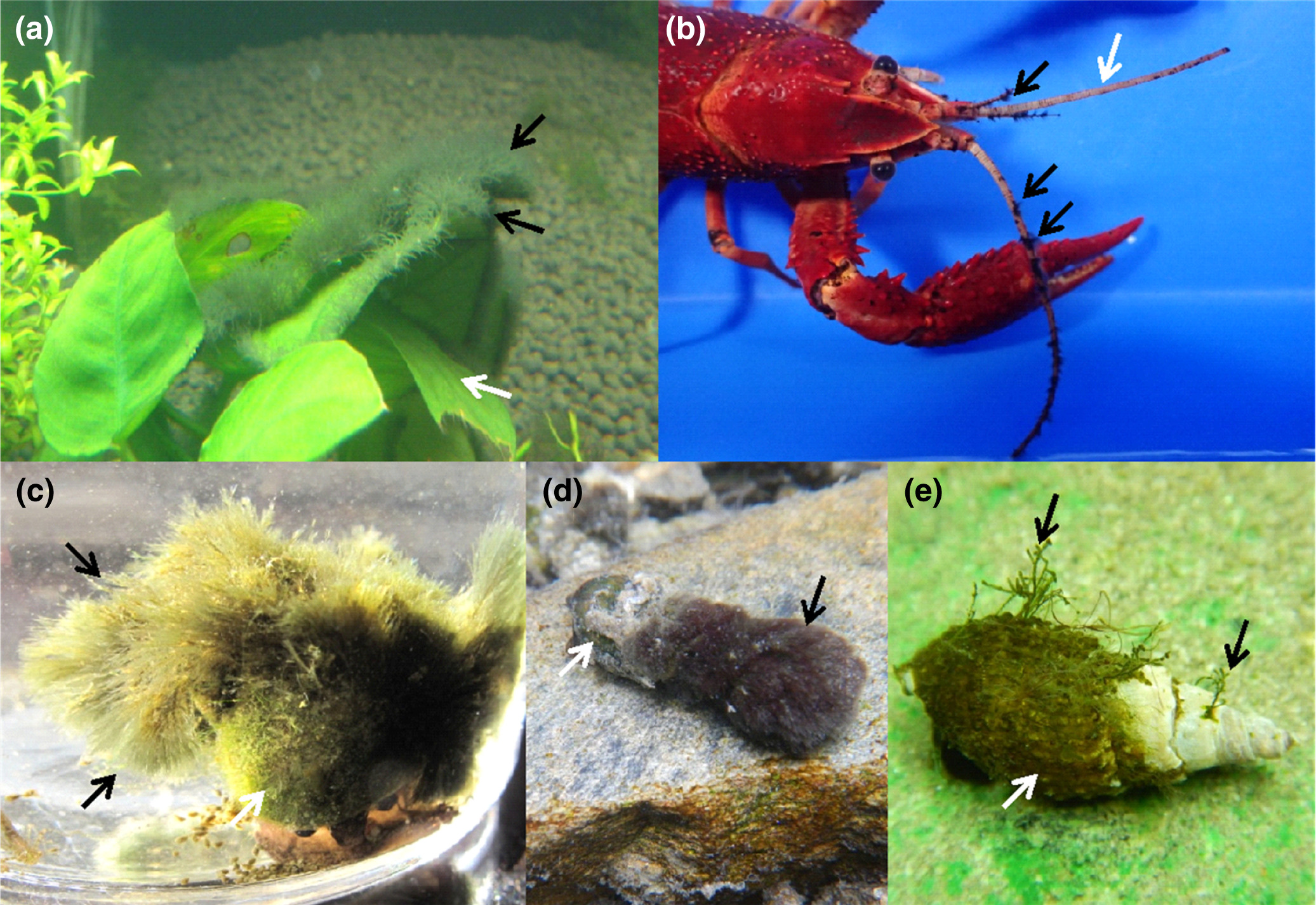
Various examples of aquatic hitchhiking algae that may be found in freshwater aquaria

There are many types of algae that are commonly found in a freshwater aquarium setting. Species may be unintentionally disseminated through spores and fragments that hitchhike on ornamental fish and plants purchased from aquarium suppliers. Algae is typically considered a nuisance and subject to removal through the use of algicides and the release of algae eaters. However, total elimination of algae is considered unlikely in a hobby aquarium.

Algae can be used as an bioindicator to inform an aquarist on water chemistry and other conditions. Some species are intentionally cultivated within algae scrubbers. Few algae, such as marimo or red moss, are sought after for aquascaping in freshwater aquaria.

== Green algae ==
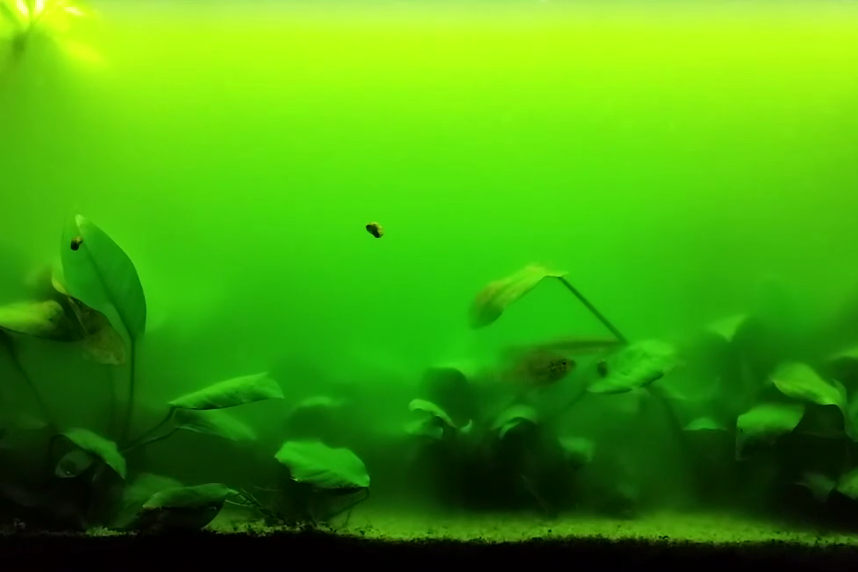
"Green water" algae infestation

Green algae respond strongly to bright light conditions as well as unbalanced carbon dioxide and nutrient levels in the water of freshwater aquaria.

Green spot algae (GSA), most likely of the genus Coleochaete, is a spot-forming algae that slowly covers glass, aquarium furniture, and plants. It adheres strongly and is considered difficult to remove. It may be a symptom of low phosphate and carbon dioxide levels in the water. However, GSA is typically a sign of a healthy aquarium and is usually present in some capacity.

Green dust algae (GDA) is similar to GSA, however it adheres less aggressively and may be easily wiped off of the glass and substrate on which it settles. The algae is motile and can actively move in the water. The species is not known. Infestations may occur after nitrogen spikes in the water. It is often seen in newly established aquaria and can also be a symptom of low carbon dioxide and nutrient levels in the water.

Green water is an algae infestation that is suspended in aquarium water. It does not settle on surfaces. They are typically of the genera Chlorella, Ankistrodesmus, and Scenedesmus. It is a very common infestation to have in newly established aquaria, but may also occur after temperature swings or nutrient imbalances. Once established, altering the water chemistry will not remove the algae. Fishless cycling is considered the best solution.

=== Filamentous green algae ===
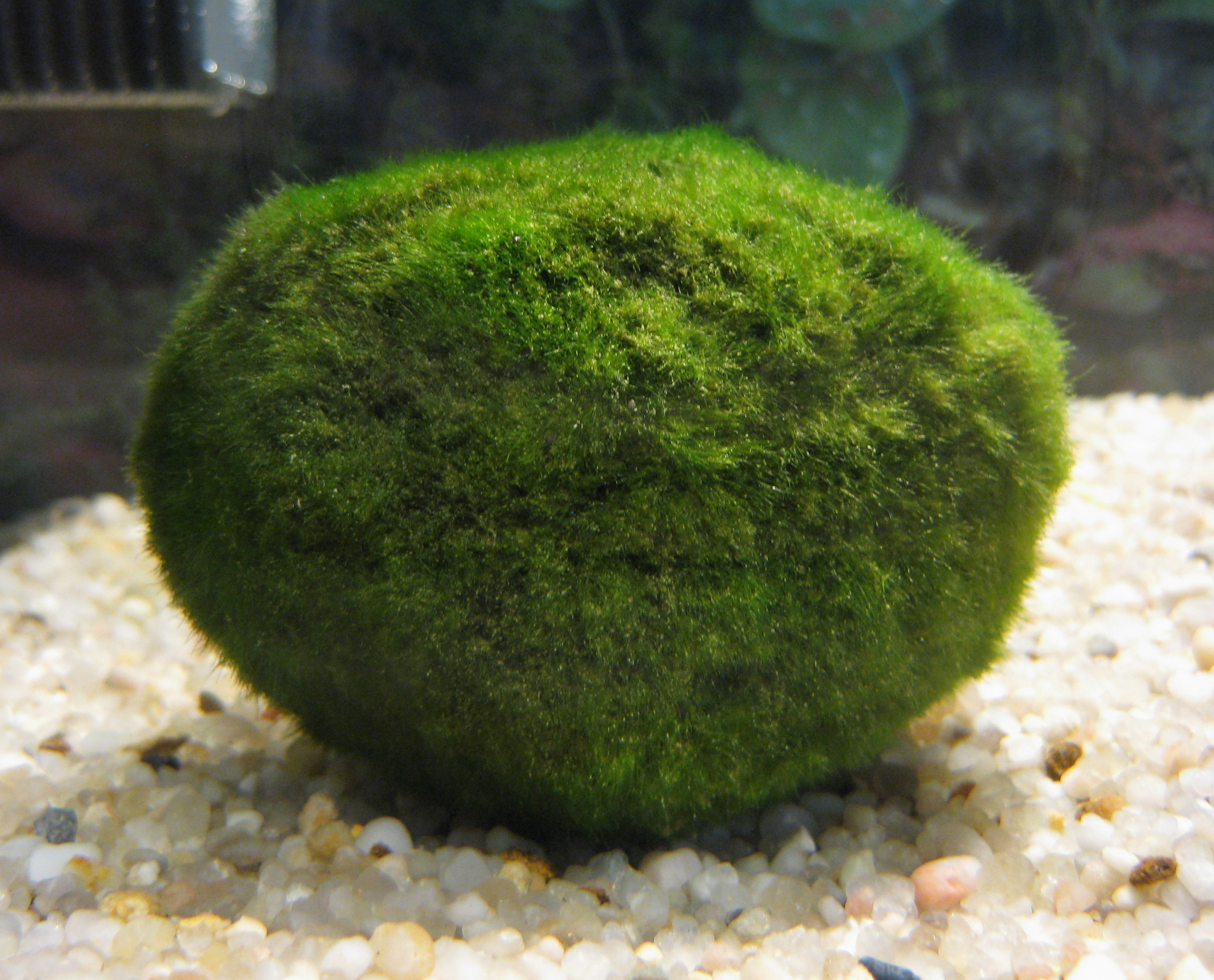
Marimo "moss" balls are one of the few desired algae species in freshwater aquaria

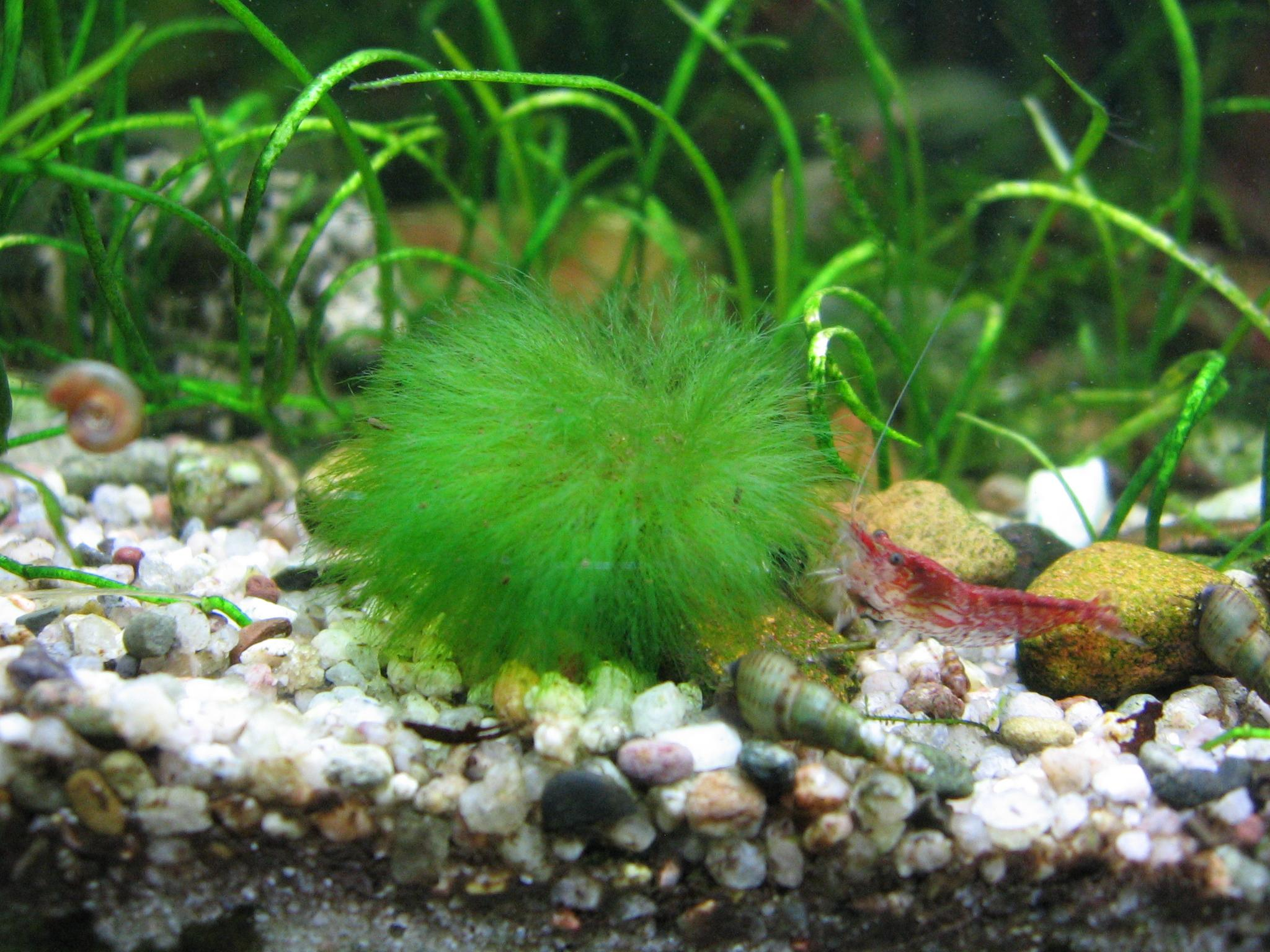
Shrimp predating upon filamentous green algae

There are several species of green algae that grow long, thread-like appendages. There is much overlap in the common names of these infestations, and positive identifications are typically difficult to ascertain.

Green thread algae comprise algae species that produce spindly filaments. It does not adhere to substrates, tending to instead grow in floating, bushy tufts. The filaments have a tendency to wrap around plants and aquarium furniture. It is a favorite of algivores such as Amano shrimp. There are several species which are referred to as green thread algae. This includes those of the genus Rhizoclonium which form pale-green to brown strands, those of the genus Spirogyra which form long green strands, and those of the genus Oedogonium which form short green strands. However, there may be thousands of species of algae with this growth form, and an identification is rarely certain. Green thread algae is common in newly established aquaria and is easily outcompeted by installed plants.

Hair algae is very similar to green thread algae. Typically, hair algae grows in a carpet of dense, short filaments. Oedogonium in particular may be referred to as hair algae. Hair algae may be caused by too much light in the aquaria. Oedogonium may also be called fuzz algae and green beard algae (GBA).

Reticulated algae or branching algae is a green algae of the genus Cladophora. It may form dense tufts of branching green strands. It spreads in the hobby aquaria trade through fragments disseminated on contaminated aquarium plants. It is very difficult to remove once established, and algivores do not prefer it. Algicides are the most effective solution. It may grow in association with marimo, an algal ball which is intentionally cultivated in hobby aquaria. Cladophora may also be referred to as "blanket weed".

== Red algae ==
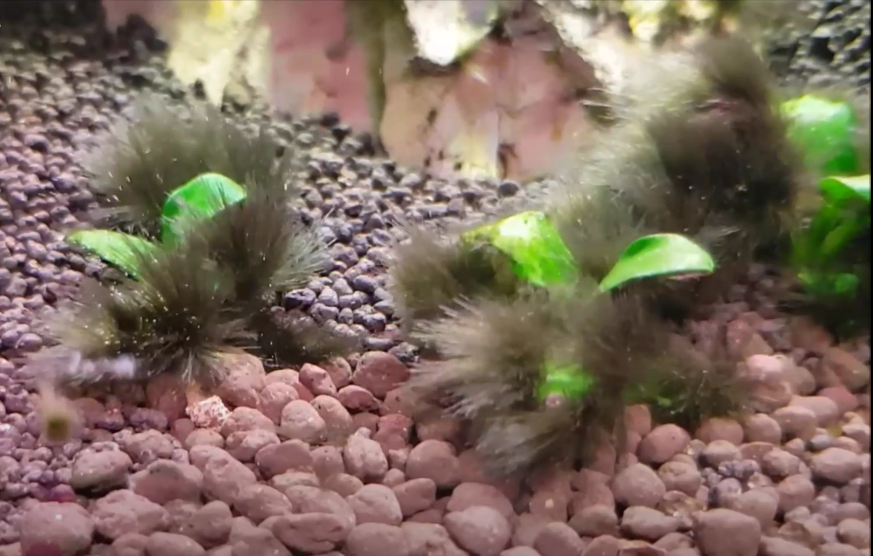
Black beard algae growing amongst installed plants in a freshwater aquarium

Red algae of the Rhodophyceae are common in a freshwater aquarium setting. Despite the name, red algae species usually present as a grayish color. Zhan et al. (2020), using DNA barcoding, found 13 different operational taxonomic units of red algae growing within freshwater aquarium stores in Taiwan. (Note: Species observed by Zhan et al. (2020) include Caloglossa beccarii, Compsopogon caeruleus, Kumanoa mahlacensis, Montagnia macrospora, Nemalionopsis shawii, Sheathia dispersa, Thorea gaudichaudii, and Thorea hispida. Five undetermined species in the genus Thorea were also found, likely indicating a cryptic species complex.)

Staghorn algae of the genus Compsopogon may exist on aquarium substrates and can be epiphytic on slow-growing plants. It can form branched, whitish-green strands up to six inches in length. It grows quickly and may be a symptom of high nitrates or high iron.

Black beard algae or black brush algae (referred to as BBA) belong to the genera Audouinella and Rhodochorton. It grows in the same habit as staghorn algae. BBA, however, tends to grow in dense patches of fine strands. It may be a symptom of high levels of nitrates, phosphates, or iron. It is considered one of the more difficult species to remove, and the plants may uptake calcium from hard water which makes them unpalatable to algivores. BBA may occur in both saltwater and freshwater aquaria.

Red spot algae may form a tenacious reddish-brown splotch or film on aquarium glass or plant leaves. It grows quickly and may be a symptom of high nitrates or iron. These encrusting red algae may be referred to as a member of the genus Hildenbrandia. It is not especially common.

Species in the genus Caloglossa, specifically C. beccarii and C. fluviatilis, are available from commercial aquarium dealers. Caloglossa cf. beccarii in particular is one of the few species of algae that is deliberately planted in freshwater aquaria. The species has been in the European aquarium trade since the 1990s.

== Blue-green algae ==
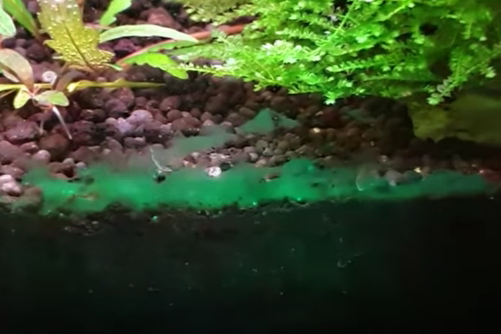
Blue green algae growing on the substrate of a fresh water aquarium

Although colloquially called algae, blue-green algae (BGA) is a type of cyanobacteria. It can present with several different colors. While there are many BGA species, the most common type found in aquaria is referred to as "slime algae". Infestations may attach to aquarium glass and substrates. It may commonly be of the genus Oscillatoria. Species from the genera Anabaena, Aphanizomenon, and Microcystis may also be found in aquaria. BGA infestations may be caused by stagnant water and high water temperatures, as well as high levels of phosphates combined with low levels of oxygen in the water.

== Brown algae ==
In aquaria, brown algae refers to diatom infestations. True brown algae of the class Phaeophyceae are not known nuisance plants of freshwater aquaria. Diatoms can coat every surface in an aquarium. Diatom infestations are ubiquitous in hobby aquaria, and eradication is not usually worth the effort. It has two growth forms - it may create either a slick brown surface or form small brown filaments. It thrives on excess ammonia or silicates.

== See also ==
- Algaculture
- Culture of microalgae in hatcheries
- List of freshwater aquarium plant species
- List of marine aquarium plant species § Nuisance algae
