= Greenwater =

Greenwater or green water may refer to:

- Green water, a maritime region
- Greenwater, California
- Greenwater, Washington
- Green water footprint, the component of water footprint originating from rain
- Green water algae, type of freshwater aquarium algae infestation
