= Yuki Imai =

Japanese actor (born 1998)

- 今井 悠貴
- Born: December 30, 1998 (age 27); Saitama Prefecture, Japan
- Occupation: Actor
- Years active: 2003–present
- Agent: Production Ogi
- Known for: Tana no Sumi; Pacchigi! Love&Peace; K-20: Legend of the Mask; Barefoot Gen; Anmitsu Hime

Yuki Imai (今井 悠貴, Imai Yūki; born December 30, 1998) is a Japanese actor.

== Biography ==
When he was three years old, Imai was taken to a theater company since he said that he "[wanted] to be on television", and began his career. He was called Yuking (ゆうキング, Yūkingu) after singing the Marimokkori theme song with a CoriCori member. Imai was a member of Central Group Central Kodomo Talent until the end of 2009.

Since 2010, he has been a member of Production Ogi.

== Filmography ==
=== TV series ===
Year	Title	Role	Notes	Ref.
2014	Gunshi Kanbei	Kuroda Kumanosuke	Taiga drama	
2018	Segodon	Kikujirō Saigō	Taiga drama	

=== Films ===
Year	Title	Role	Notes	Ref.
2026	Agito: Psychic War			
