= Red Moss =

Red Moss may refer to:

- Red Moss, Aberdeenshire, a bog in Aberdeenshire, Scotland
- Red Moss, Greater Manchester, a bog in Greater Manchester, England

== See also ==
- Red moss, a species of algae
