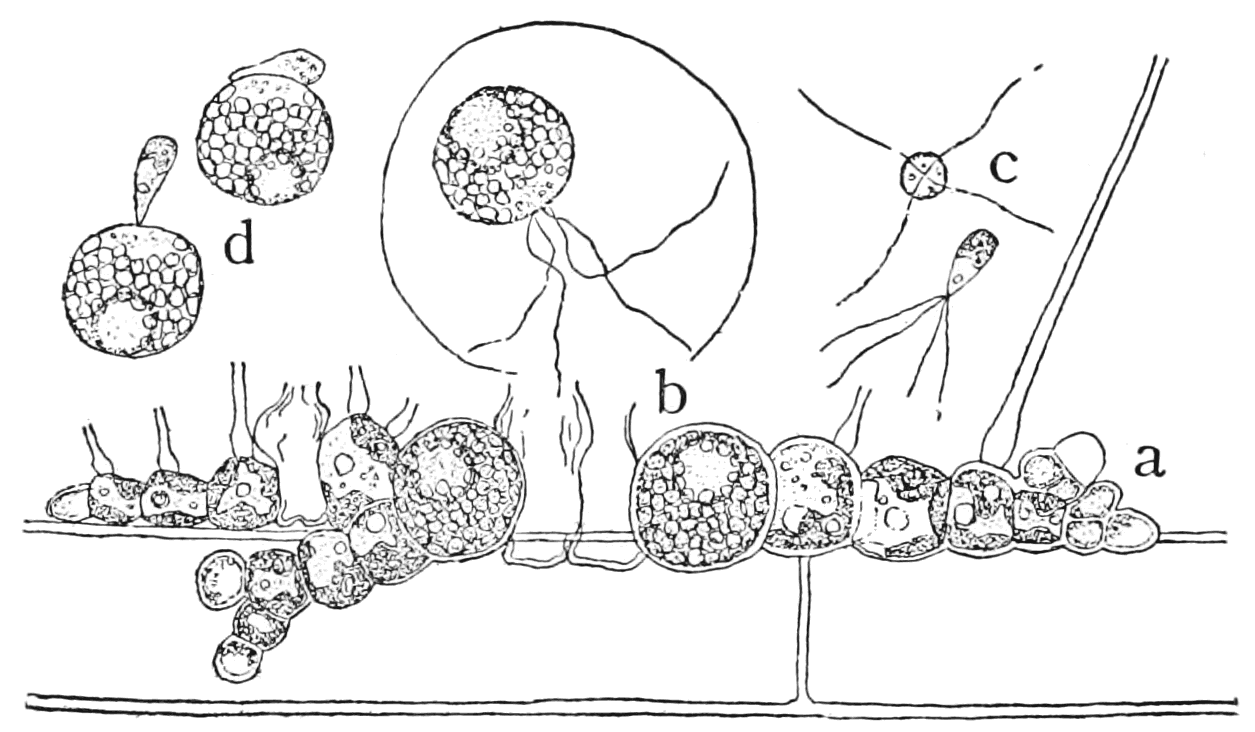
- Aphanochaete repens

Scientific classification
- Kingdom: Plantae
- Division: Chlorophyta
- Class: Chlorophyceae
- Order: Chaetophorales
- Family: Aphanochaetaceae
- Genus: Aphanochaete; A. Braun, 1851

Type species
- Aphanochaete repens A. Braun, 1850

Species
- Aphanochaete elegans; Aphanochaete hyalothecae; Aphanochaete magna; Aphanochaete pilosissima; Aphanochaete polychaete; Aphanochaete repens; Aphanochaete vermiculoides

= Aphanochaete =

Genus of algae

Aphanochaete is a genus of green algae in the family Aphanochaetaceae. The name Aphanochaete was given by Alexander Braun in 1850. The genus was actually described one year earlier by Carl Nägeli as Herposteiron, but the name Aphanochaete has been conserved against Herposteiron.

Aphanochaete is a common epiphyte or aquatic plants or filamentous algae, such as Cladophora and Oedogonium. It is found in freshwater (rarely brackish water), particularly eutrophic and hard water, and has a cosmopolitan distribution.

== Description ==
Aphanochaete consists of uniseriate filaments, attached to a substrate and with a prostrate arrangement (creeping along the substrate). Cells are globose to cylindrical, with one nucleus and a parietal chloroplast with one to several pyrenoids. One or several setae may emerge from the upper surface of a cell; they are long, unicellular and often swollen at the base.

Aphanochaete reproduces asexually by aplanospores or quadriflagellate zoospores. Oogamous sexual reproduction has also been observed; female gametes are stalked and spherical, while the male gametes are quadriflagellate. Zygotes are thick-walled and sometimes contain oil droplets.

Species are distinguished based on how the zoospores germinate (whether the germlings are cruciate or bipolar), morphology of the unicellular hairs (whether swollen or not at the base), and the morphology of thalli.
