= Chaetonema =

Scientific classification
- Kingdom: Plantae
- Division: Chlorophyta
- Class: Chlorophyceae
- Order: Chaetophorales
- Family: Aphanochaetaceae
- Genus: Chaetonema; Nowakowski, 1876

Type species
- Chaetonema irregulare

Species
- Chaetonema irregulare; Chaetonema ornatum

Genus of algae

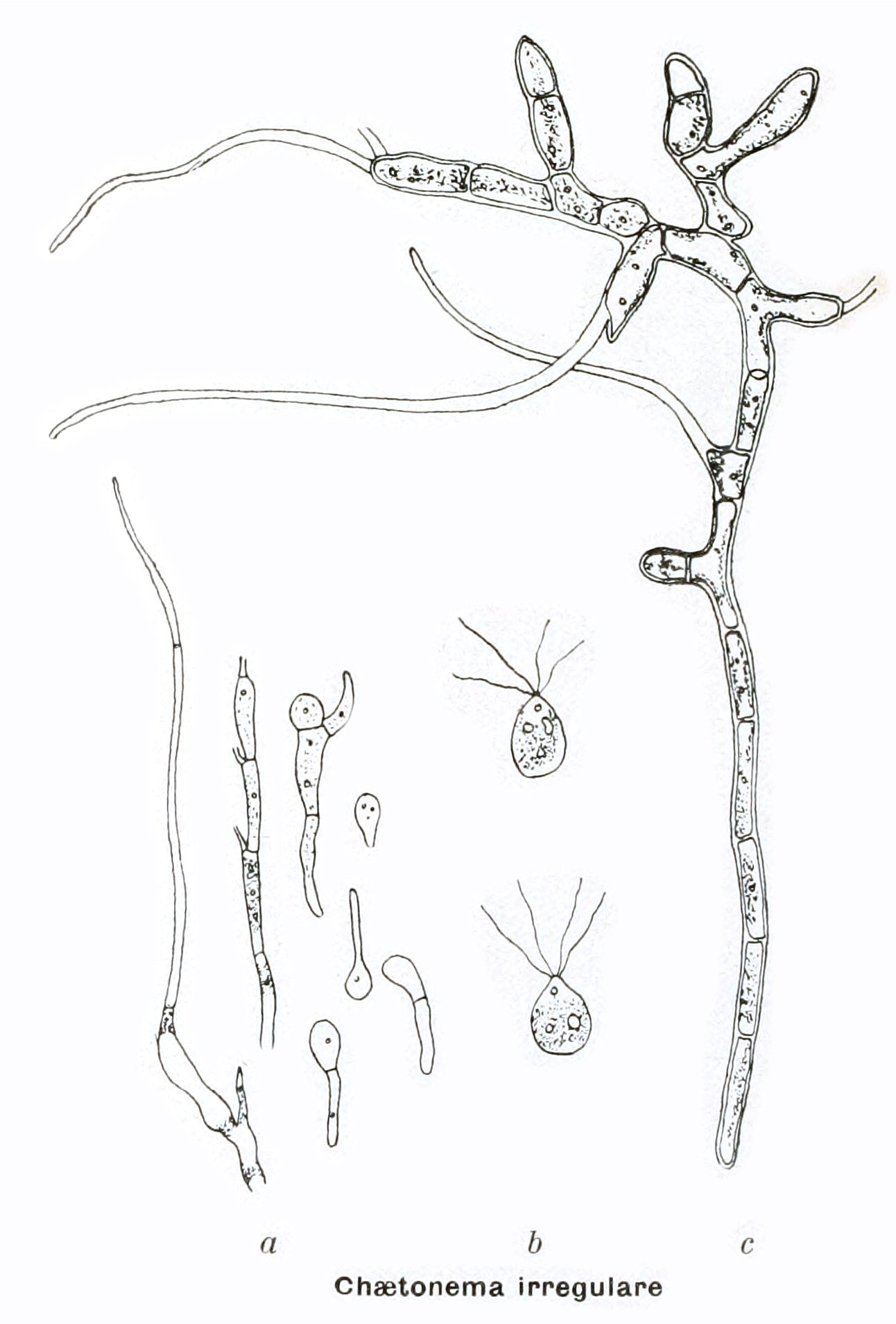
Drawing of Chaetonema irregulare

Chaetonema is a genus of green algae in the family Aphanochaetaceae.
