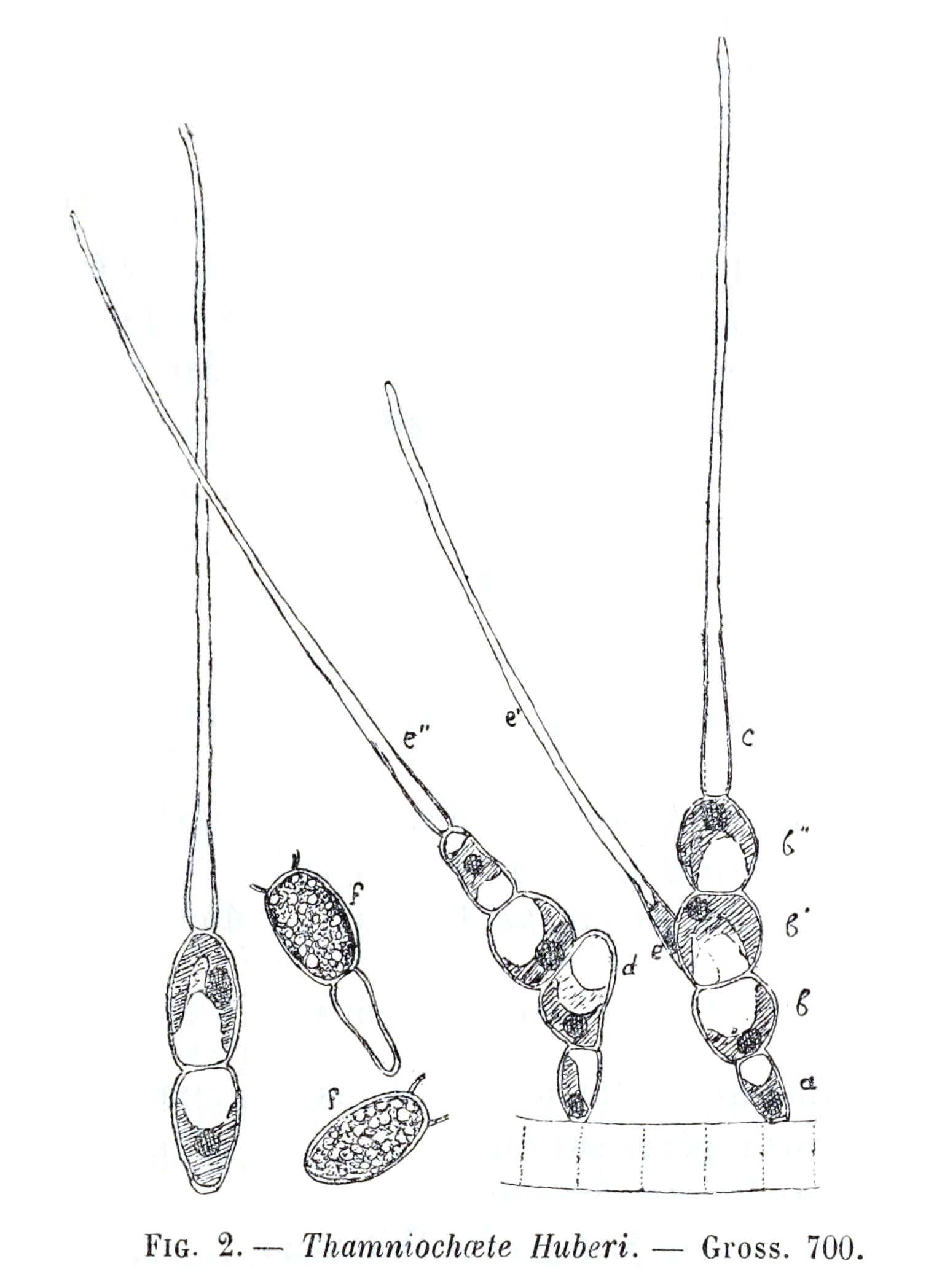
- Thamniochaete huberi

Scientific classification
- Clade: Viridiplantae
- Division: Chlorophyta
- Class: Chlorophyceae
- Order: Chaetophorales
- Family: Aphanochaetaceae
- Genus: Thamniochaete; F. Gay, 1893

Type species
- Thamniochaete huberii

Species
- Thamniochaete aculeata; Thamniochaete huberii

= Thamniochaete =

Genus of algae

Thamniochaete is a genus of green algae in the family Aphanochaetaceae. It has been reported growing on stones and wood in moving water.

Thamniochaete consists of crusts or single filaments, the filaments being short and erect or creeping. Filaments are uniseriate, with short branches. Cells are cylindrical, uninucleate, with one parietal chloroplast and pyrenoids. Terminal cells have long, basally swollen hairs attached to them.

Asexual reproduction (via zoospores) have been documented in one species; the zoospores are ovoid or spherical and biflagellate. Sexual reproduction is unknown.
