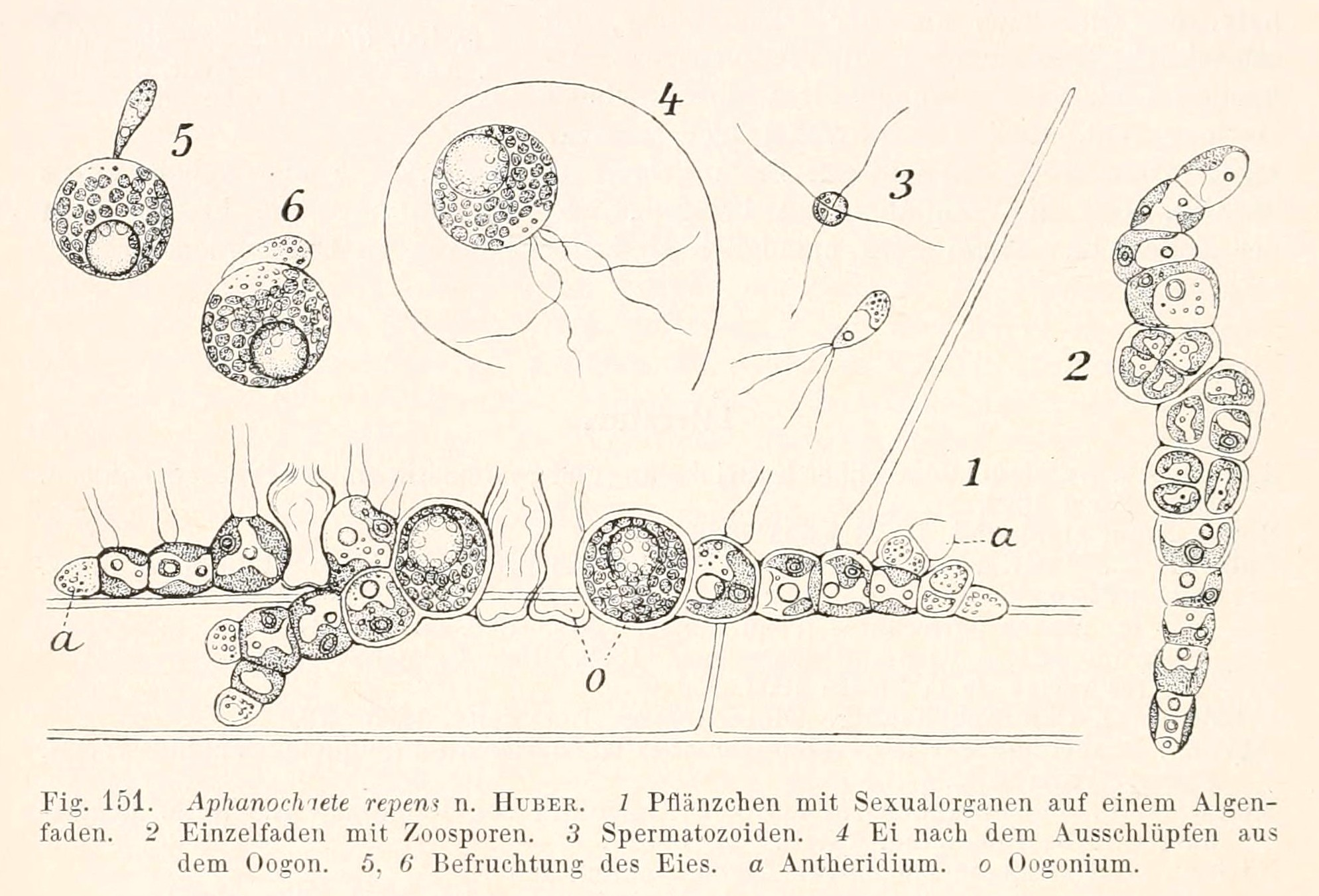

Scientific classification
- Kingdom: Plantae
- Division: Chlorophyta
- Class: Chlorophyceae
- Order: Chaetophorales
- Family: Aphanochaetaceae; Oltmanns

Genera
- See text

= Aphanochaetaceae =

Family of algae

Aphanochaetaceae is a family of green algae in the order Chaetophorales. It occurs mainly in freshwater habitats; it may inhabit running or stagnant water, sometimes within the mucilage of red algae or other green algae.

Members of the Aphanochaetaceae are filamentous algae; the filaments may be simple or branched, usually prostrate (lying horizontally relative to the substrate) or less commonly erect. The cells are spherical to cylindrical or irregularly shaped, with hairs. The hairs are mostly bulbous at the bases. Cells are uninucleate (with one nucleus) and a single chloroplast of varying morphology (discoid, ring-shaped or perforated) with one or more pyrenoids.

Vegetative reproduction occurs by the fragmentation of filaments. Asexual reproduction occurs by quadriflagellate zoospores, less often by aplanospores, and akinetes. Sexual reproduction may be anisogamous or oogamous.

A molecular and morphological analysis found that Aphanochaetaceae is characterized by having zoospores that germinate into prostrate filaments that grow outwards, parallel to the surface. The apical cells of germlings are rounded, unlike other families in the order Chaetophorales. However, this study only examined the type genus, Aphanochaete; other genera are included based on the hair cells, but under this circumscription the family appears to be artificial.

== Genera ==
As of 2025, Aphanochaetaceae includes the following genera:

- Aphanochaete Braun
- Chaetonema Nowakowski [Nowakovsky]
- Gonatoblaste J.Huber, 1892
- Micropoa Moewus
- Thamniochaete F.Gay
