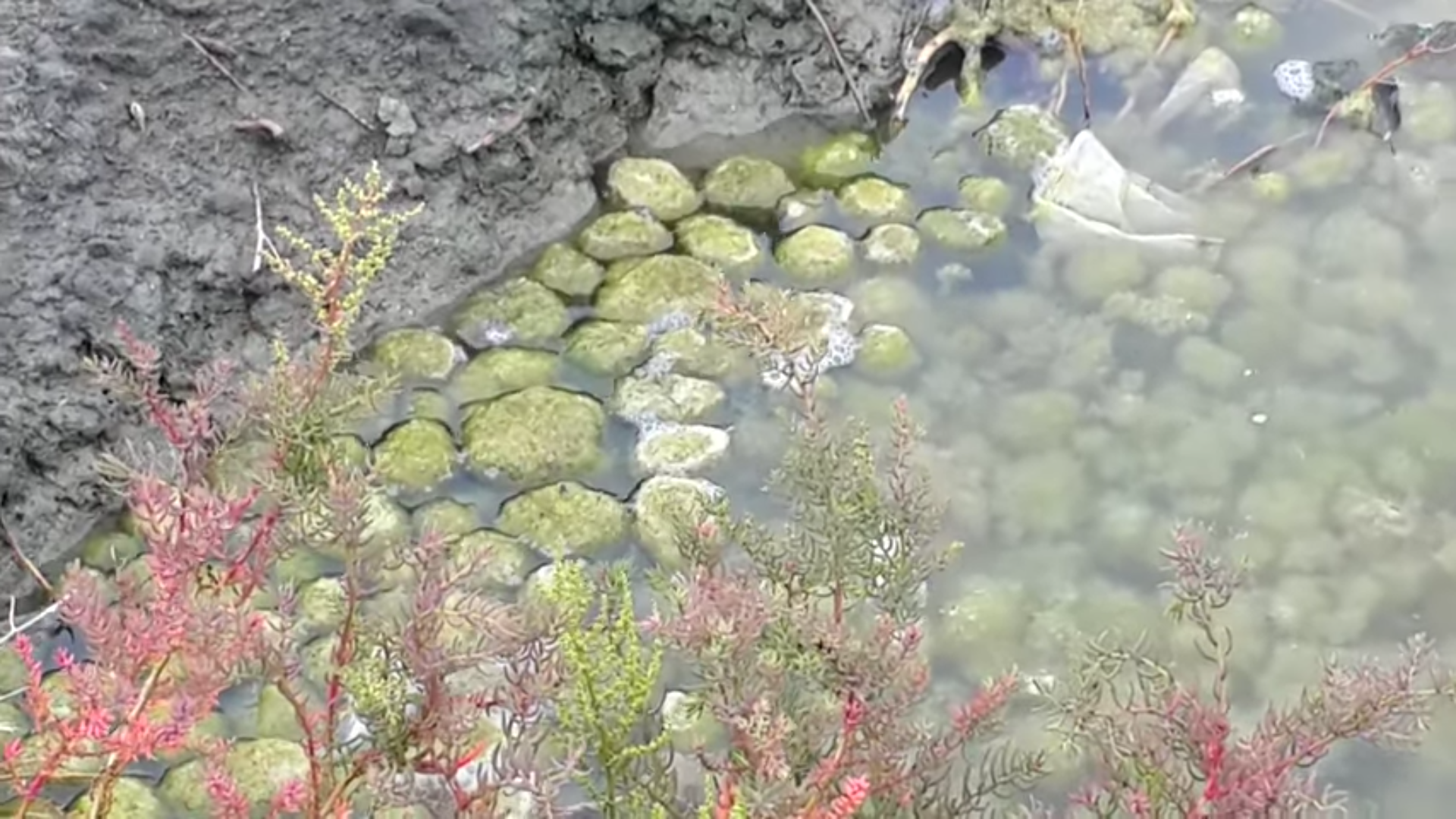
- Cladophora socialis in central Thailand

Scientific classification
- Kingdom: Plantae
- Division: Chlorophyta
- Class: Ulvophyceae
- Order: Cladophorales
- Family: Cladophoraceae
- Genus: Cladophora
- Species: C. socialis

Binomial name
- Cladophora socialis Kützing, 1849

= Cladophora socialis =

Species of alga

Cladophora socialis is a species of green algae.

== Distribution ==
Cladophora socialis is found in many locations over the world including the Atlantic Ocean and Pacific Ocean.
