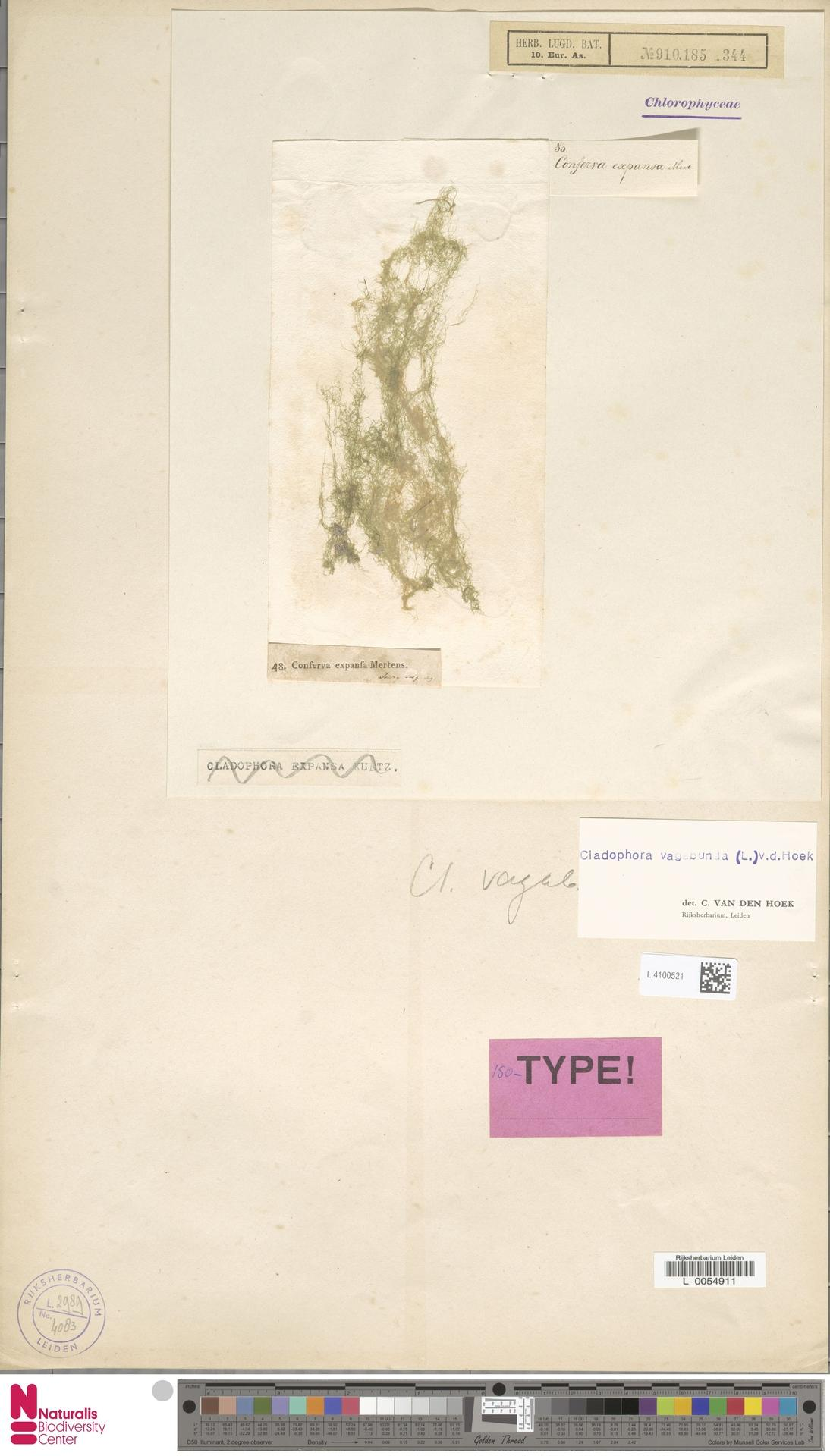
- Conferva expansa Mert. (type of) - Cladophora vagabunda (L.) C.Hoek at Naturalis Biodiversity Center in Leiden, Netherlands

Scientific classification
- Clade: Viridiplantae
- Division: Chlorophyta
- Class: Ulvophyceae
- Order: Cladophorales
- Family: Cladophoraceae
- Genus: Cladophora
- Species: C. vagabunda

Binomial name
- Cladophora vagabunda (Linnaeus) Hoek, 1963

Synonyms
- Several, including: Ceramium vagabundum (Linnaeus) Roth, 1800; Cladophora elegans f. major Brand, 1904; Conferva expansa Mert.; Conferva vagabunda Linnaeus, 1753

= Cladophora vagabunda =

Species of alga

Cladophora vagabunda is a species of marine green algae in the family Cladophoraceae. It has a worldwide distribution.
