= Airstone =

Aquarium furniture

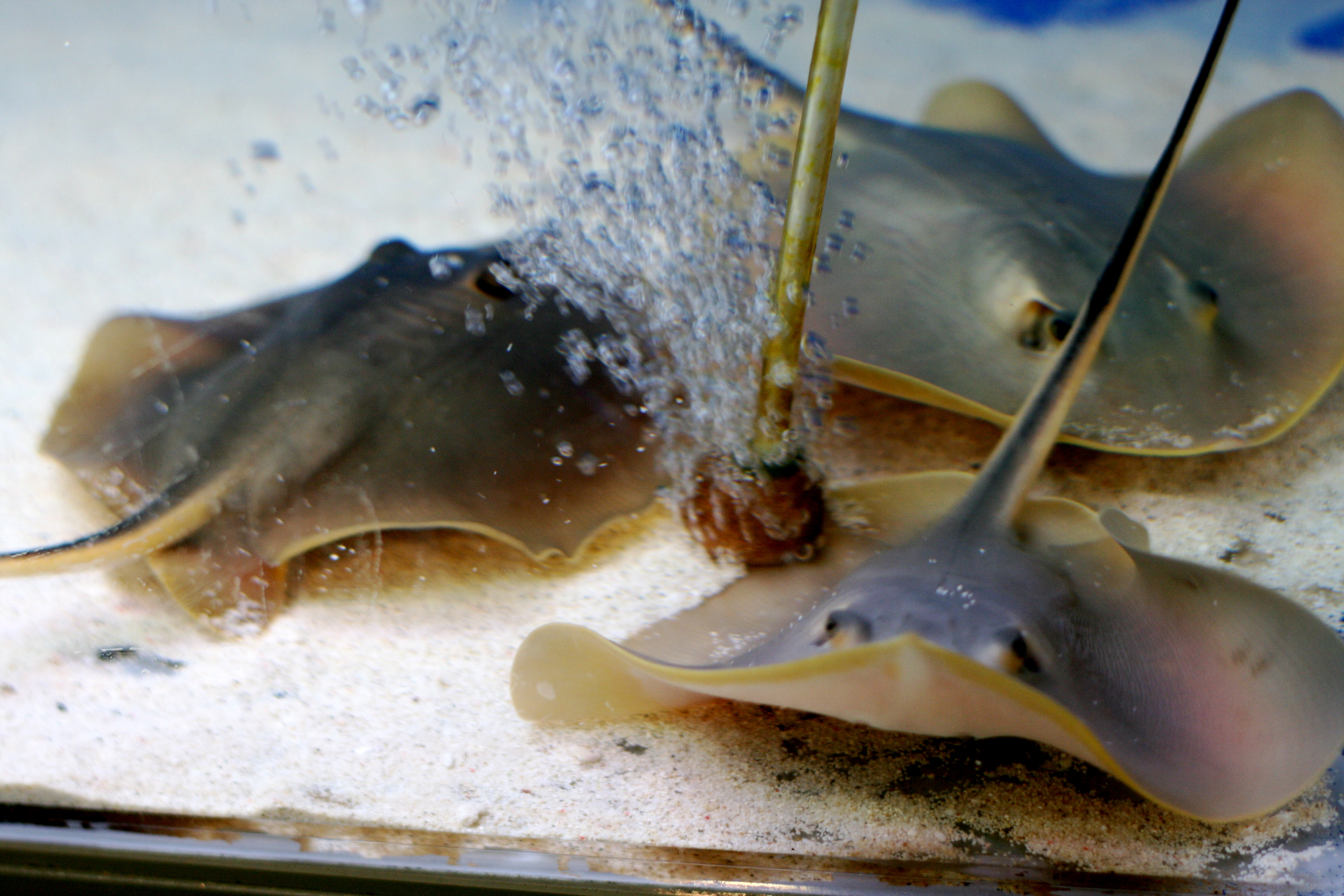
A spherical airstone at the Osaka Aquarium alongside a trio of red stingray pups, Hemitrygon akajei

An airstone, also called an aquarium bubbler, is a piece of aquarium furniture, traditionally a piece of limewood or porous stone, whose purpose is to gradually diffuse air into the tank, eliminating the noise and large bubbles of conventional air filtration systems, and providing other benefits to the health of the fish. "Airstone" is also a brand name stone or brick veneer used by homebuilders. Airstones are sold in a very wide variety of shapes, sizes, and levels of coarseness – from extremely rough, producing larger (though still typically unnoticeable) bubbles and letting in more oxygen – to very fine, producing minuscule bubbles. Airstones are increasingly being made from bonded glass beads and synthetic products like fiberglass.

There is some controversy as to the efficiency of airstones versus the conventional powerhead system when used in uplift tubes as part of an under-gravel filter. Arguments can be made in favor of both systems, and both possess certain advantages and disadvantages. Among aquarists, the choice is very much a matter of personal preference, quite often discussed in internet forums.

== Protein skimming ==
Protein skimmer built around a wooden airstone (5): 1. foam collector; 2. foam; 3. water; 4. air bubbles; 5. linden cube; 6. water inlet; 7. water outlet.

The original method of protein skimming, running pressurized air through a diffuser to produce large quantities of micro bubbles, remains a viable, effective, and economic choice, although newer technologies may require lower maintenance. The air stone is most often an oblong, partially hollowed block of wood, most often of the genus Tilia. The most popular wooden air-stones for skimmers are made from limewood (Tilia europaea or European limewood) although basswood (Tilia americana or American Linden), works as well, may be cheaper and is often more readily available. The wooden blocks are drilled, tapped, fitted with an air fitting, and connected by air tubing to one or more air pumps delivering at least 1 cubic foot per minute. The wooden air stone is placed at the bottom of a tall column of water. The tank water is pumped into the column, allowed to pass by the rising bubbles, and back into the tank. To get enough contact time with the bubble, these units can be many feet in height.

Air stone protein skimmers may be constructed as a DIY project from PVC pipes and fittings at low cost and with varying degrees of complexity .

While this method has been around for many years, many regard it as inefficient for larger systems or systems with large bio-loads.

== See also ==
- Aeration
