= Marimokkori =

Mascot of Hokkaido, Japan

Marimokkori (まりもっこり) is the yuru-chara mascot of Hokkaidō, Japan. The name "Marimokkori" is a portmanteau of marimo, green algae clusters that grow in some of Hokkaidō's lakes, and mokkori, a Japanese slang term for an erection.

Marimokkori's fame comes through merchandising, with a number of various souvenirs being sold in Hokkaidō and throughout Japan.

== History ==
In 2005, the souvenir wholesaler Kyowa Co., Ltd. created a character based on the portmanteau of marimo, a green algae that grows in Lake Akan, and mokkori, a Japanese slang term for an erection. Kyowa started selling mobile phone accessories, which were initially rejected by some souvenir shops due to the vulgarity of the character's design.

The character was then featured in the STV Radio program "Tokimeki Wide" and has since gradually gained popularity in Hokkaido. The character has since been promoted by celebrities and featured in television media throughout Japan.
