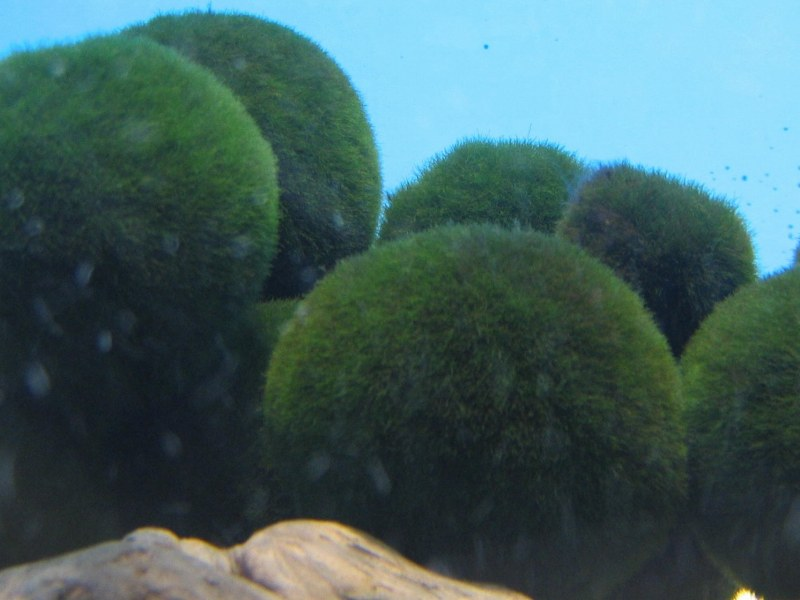
- Marimo in Lake Akan in Japan
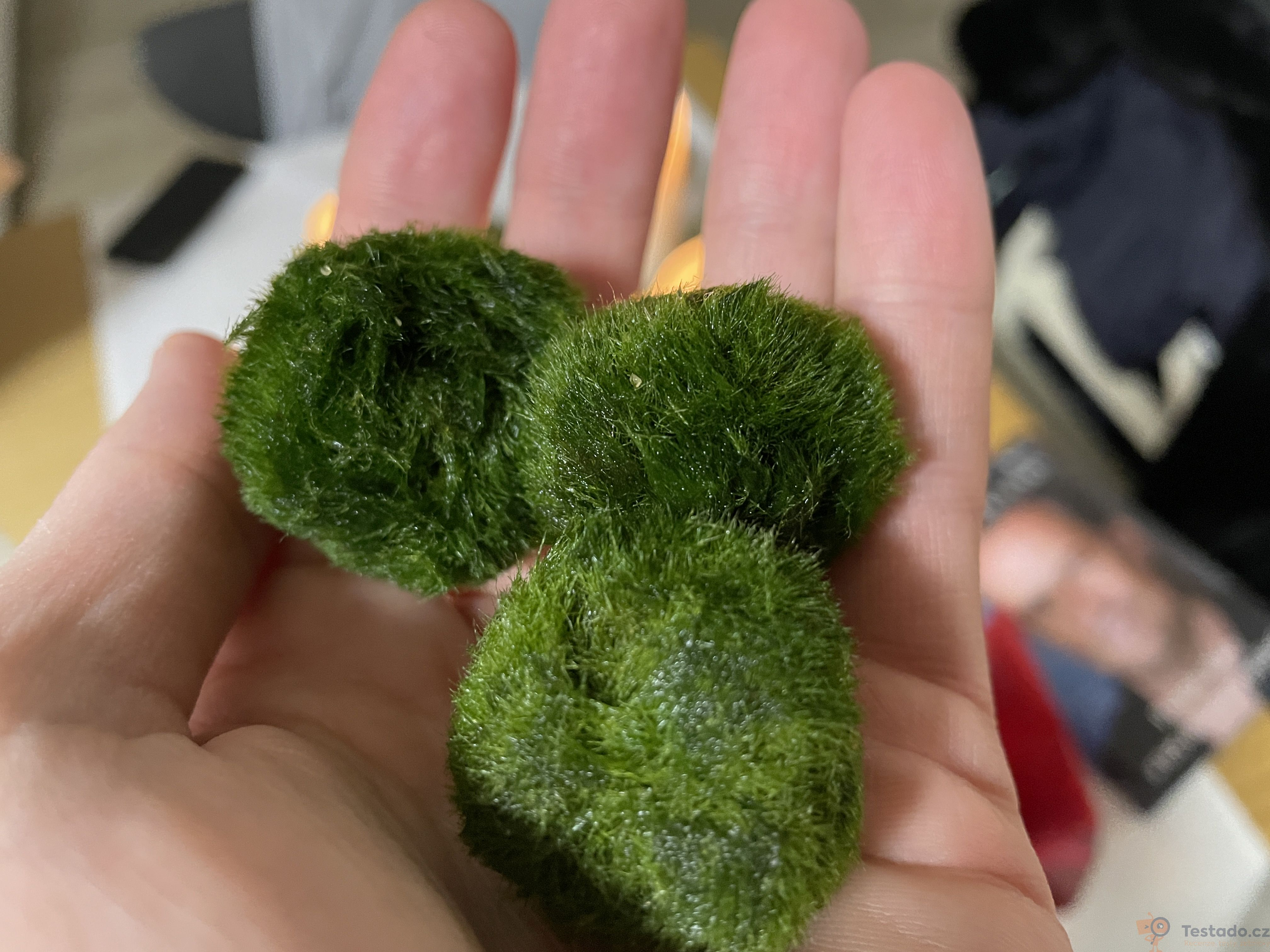

Scientific classification
- Domain: Eukaryota
- Supergroup: Archaeplastida
- Clade: Viridiplantae
- Division: Chlorophyta
- Class: Ulvophyceae
- Order: Cladophorales
- Family: Pithophoraceae
- Genus: Aegagropila; Kützing
- Species: A. brownii

Binomial name
- Aegagropila brownii (Dillwyn) Kützing

= Marimo =

Species of algae

Marimo (Note: From the Japanese マリモ or 毬藻, literally 'ball seaweed' or 'ball algae') (also known as Cladophora ball, moss ball, moss ball pet, or lake ball) is a rare growth form of Aegagropila brownii (a species of filamentous green algae previously known as Aegagropila linnaei) in which the algae grow into large green spheres with a velvety appearance.

The species can be found in a number of lakes and rivers in Japan and Northern Europe. Colonies of marimo balls are known to form in Japan and Iceland, but their population has been declining.

== Classification and name ==
Marimo were first described in the 1820s by Anton E. Sauter, found in Lake Zell, Austria. The genus Aegagropila was established by Friedrich T. Kützing (1843) with A. linnaei as the type species based on its formation of spherical aggregations, but all the Aegagropila species were transferred to subgenus Aegagropila of the genus Cladophora later by the same author (Kützing 1849). Subsequently, A. linnaei was placed in the genus Cladophora in the Cladophorales and was renamed Cladophora aegagropila (L.) Rabenhorst and Cl. sauteri (Nees ex Kütz.) Kütz. Extensive DNA research in 2002 returned the name to Aegagropila linnaei. The presence of chitin in the cell walls makes it distinct from the genus Cladophora.

The algae was named marimo by the Japanese botanist Takiya Kawakami in 1898. Mari is a type of bouncy play ball; mo is a generic Japanese term for plants that grow in water. The native names in Ainu are torasampe ('lake goblin') and tokarip ('lake roller'). They are sometimes sold in aquariums under the name "Japanese moss balls" although they are unrelated to moss. In Iceland the lake balls are called kúluskítur by the local fishermen at Lake Mývatn (kúla meaning 'ball', skítur meaning 'muck') where the "muck" is any weeds that get entangled in their fishing nets. The generic name Aegagropila is Greek for 'goat hair'.

== Growth forms ==
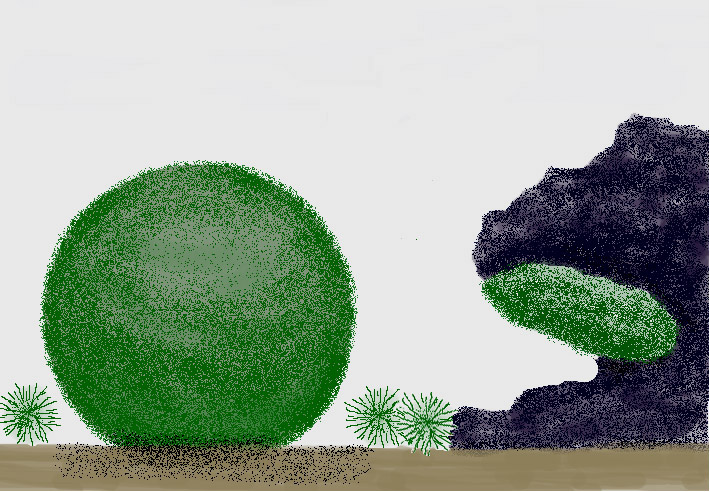
Three common growth forms of Aegagropila linnaei: as a ball, free-floating filaments, and growth on rocks.

The algae has three growth forms:

- It can grow on rocks, usually found on the shaded side of the rocks. This is also known as epilithic growth.
- It can exist as free-floating filaments. Small tufts of unattached filaments frequently form a carpet on the muddy lake bottom.
- It can form a lake ball where the algae grow into sizable balls of densely packed algal filaments that radiate from the center. Large balls may form a central cavity, and they show annual rings. The balls do not have a kernel of any sort.

A cross section of a marimo colony in Lake Mývatn.

== Ecology ==
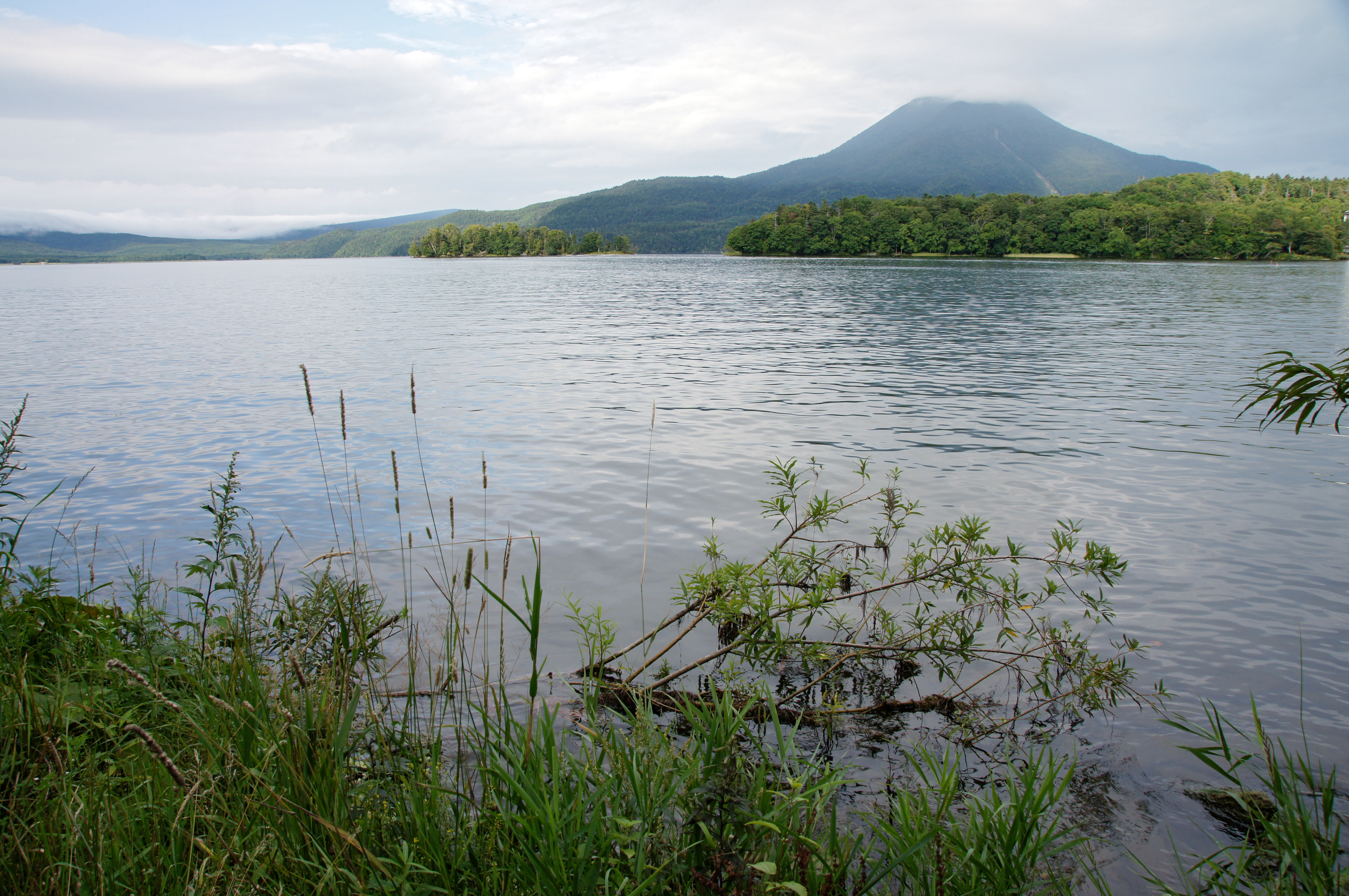
Lake Akan and Mount Oakan in Japan.

The existence of marimo colonies depends on the adaptation of the species to low light conditions, combined with the dynamic interaction of wind-induced currents, light regime, lake morphology, bottom substrate, and sedimentation.

=== Size ===
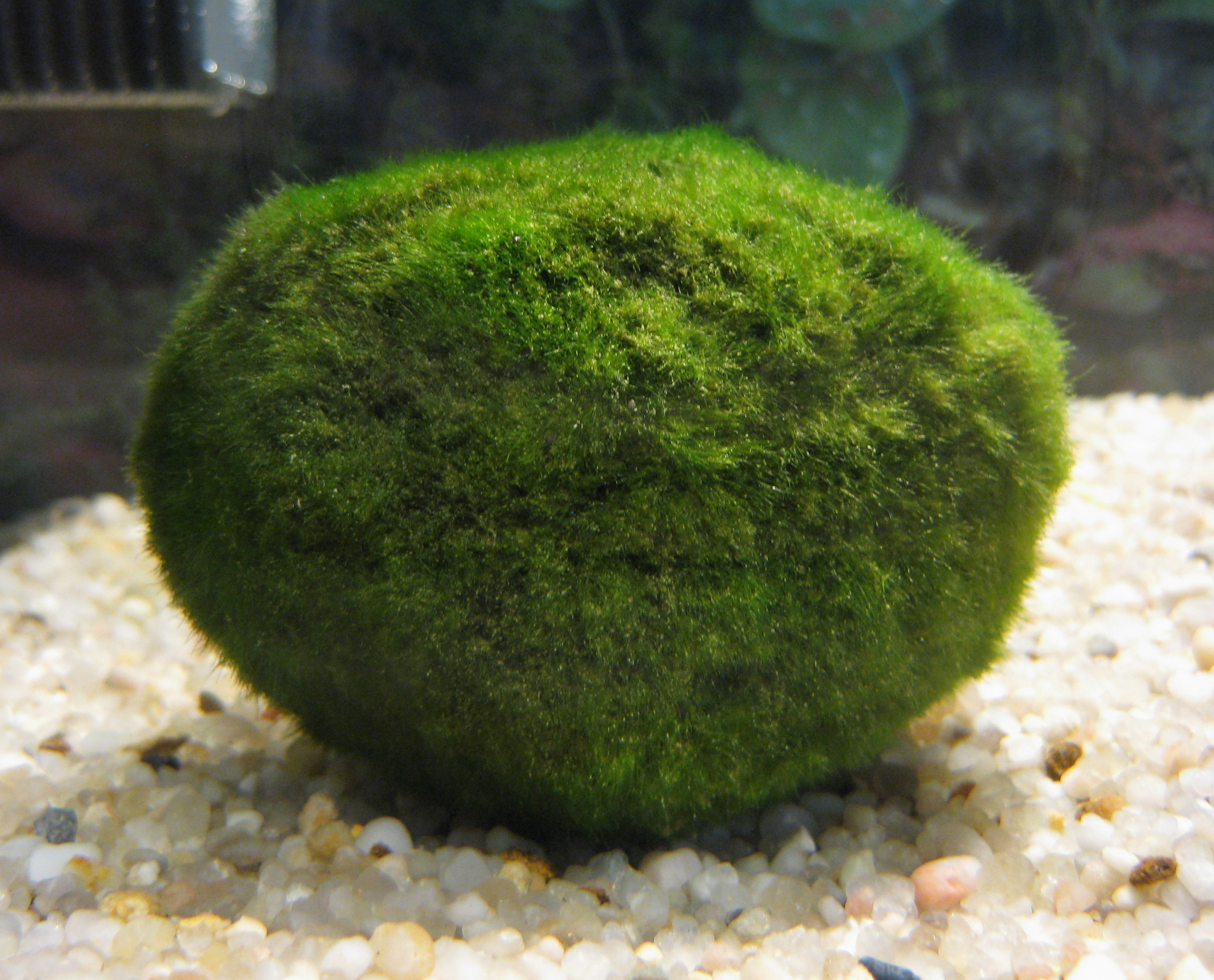
Marimo in an aquarium

The growth rate of marimo is about 5 mm (0.2 in) per year. In Lake Akan in Japan they grow particularly large, up to 20–30 cm (8–12 in). Lake Mývatn, Iceland, had dense colonies of marimo that grow to about 12 cm (5 in) in diameter and formed well defined patches on the lake floor at depths ranging from 2–2.5 m (6.6–8.2 ft).

=== Shape ===
The round shape of the marimo is maintained by gentle wave action that occasionally turns it. The best environment for that are shallow lakes with sandy bottoms.

The balls are green all the way round which guarantees that they can photosynthesize no matter which side is turned upwards. Inside, the ball is also green and packed with dormant chloroplasts which become active in a matter of hours if the ball breaks apart. The wave action also cleans the balls of dead organic material.

As some colonies have two or even three layers of marimo balls, wave action is needed to tumble them around so each ball reaches the light. The spherical shape has a low surface-area-to-volume ratio compared to a leaf, which limits photosynthesis and therefore limits the maximum size of the marimo balls.

=== Habitat ===
Marimo's preferred habitat is in lakes with a low or moderate biological activity, and with moderate or high levels of calcium.

=== Distribution ===
The species is mainly found in the areas of Europe previously covered in glaciers (Northern-Europe), and in several places in Japan. It has been found in North America, but it is rare, as well as in Australia.

=== Population decline ===
The species is sensitive to the amount of nutrients in the water. An excess of nutrients (due to agriculture and fish farming), along with mud deposition from human activity are thought to be the main causes for its disappearance from many lakes.

The species still exists in Lake Zell in Austria (where it was first discovered in the 1820s) but the lake ball growth form has not been found there since around 1910. The same has happened in most locations in England and Scotland, where mainly the attached form can be found.

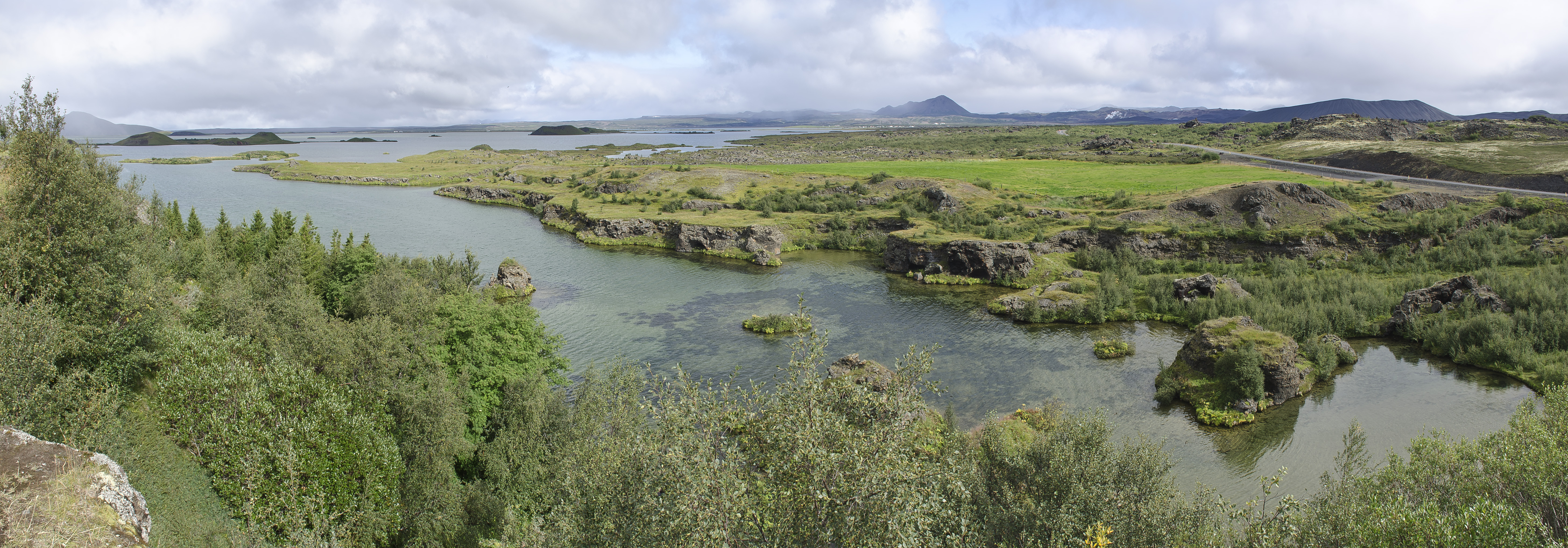
Lake Mývatn in Iceland.

Dense colonies of marimo were discovered in Lake Mývatn in Iceland in 1978, but they have shrunk considerably since then. By 2014 the marimo had almost completely disappeared from the lake due to an excess of nutrients. The ecosystem is now improving and small marimo balls are forming again.

The species can still be found in several places in Japan, but populations have also declined there. At Lake Akan, a great effort is spent on the conservation of the lake balls.

The marimo has been a protected species in Japan since the 1920s, and in Iceland since 2006. Lake Akan is protected as a national park and Lake Mývatn is protected as a nature reserve.

== Cultural aspects ==
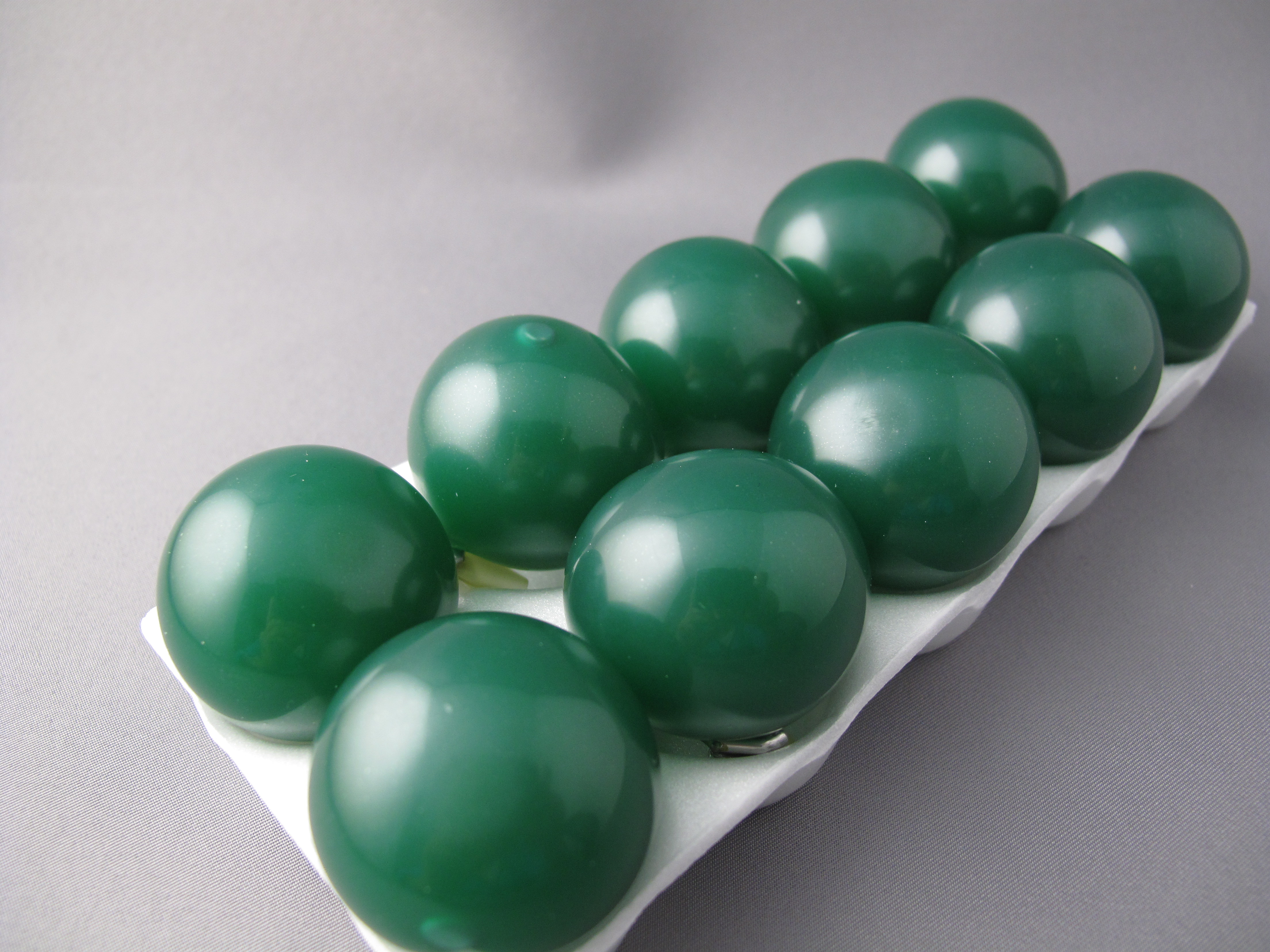
Yōkan confection shaped like marimo, sold near Lake Akan

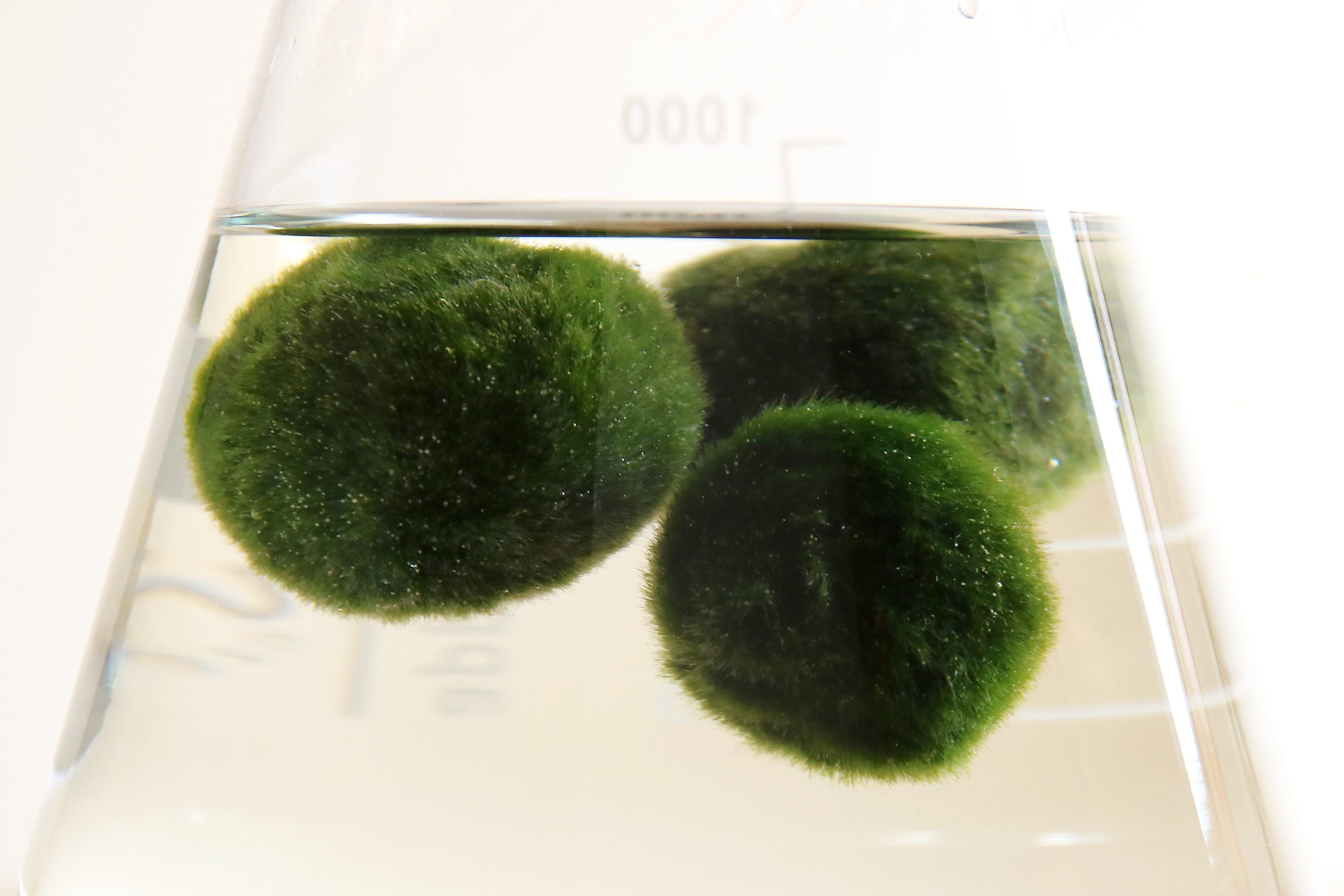
A. linnaei grown in a conical flask at home.

Marimo balls are a rare curiosity. In Japan, the Ainu people hold a three-day marimo festival every October at Lake Akan.

Because of their appealing appearance, the lake balls also serve as a medium for environmental education. Small balls sold as souvenirs are hand rolled from free-floating filaments. A widely marketed stuffed toy character known as Marimokkori takes the anthropomorphic form of the marimo algae as one part of its design.

Marimo are sometimes sold for display in aquariums, typically cultivated in Ukrainian lakes such as the Shatskyi Lakes. Balls sold in Japanese aquarium shops are of European origin, as collecting them from Lake Akan is prohibited.

== Contamination ==
On 2 March 2021, the United States Geological Survey was notified that zebra mussels had been discovered in moss balls sold in pet stores across North America. By 8 March, invasive zebra mussels had been detected in moss balls in 21 states. These discoveries were prompted by the initial find at a Seattle Petco. Owners of fish tanks were urged to decontaminate the moss balls by boiling, freezing, or bleaching them before disposing of them to prevent spread to local waterways. Petco and PetSmart voluntarily recalled moss balls in their stores. If the mussels reach open water in Washington, they could cost the state $100 million each year in maintenance for power and water systems.

== See also ==
- List of Special Natural Monuments in Japan
- Codium bursa, a round marine algae
- Red moss, another species of algae used in freshwater aquascaping

== Bibliography ==
- Einarsson, Árni; Stefánsdóttir, Gerdur; Jóhannesson, Helgi; Ólafsson, Jón S.; Már Gíslason, Gísli; Wakana, Isamu; Gudbergsson, Gudni; Gardarsson, Arnthor (2004). "The ecology of Lake Myvatn and the River Laxá: Variation in space and time". Aquatic Ecology. 38 (2): 317–348. Bibcode:2004AqEco..38..317E. doi:10.1023/b:aeco.0000032090.72702.a9. S2CID 30398384.
- Hanyuda, Takeaki; Wakana, Isamu; Arai, Shogo; Miyaji, Kazuyuki; Watano, Yasuyuki; Ueda, Kunihiko (2002). "PHYLOGENETIC RELATIONSHIPS WITHIN CLADOPHORALES (ULVOPHYCEAE, CHLOROPHYTA) INFERRED FROM 18S rRNA GENE SEQUENCES, WITH SPECIAL REFERENCE TO AEGAGROPILA LINNAEI 1". Journal of Phycology. 38 (3): 564–571. Bibcode:2002JPcgy..38..564H. doi:10.1046/j.1529-8817.2002.01151.x. S2CID 84081568.
- Jónsson, Gunnar St.; Jonsson, Gunnar St. (1992). "Photosynthesis and Production of Epilithic Algal Communities in Thingvallavatn". Oikos. 64 (1/2): 222–240. Bibcode:1992Oikos..64..222J. doi:10.2307/3545053. JSTOR 3545053.
- Nagasawa, S., Wakana, I. and Nagao, M. 1994. Mathematical characterization of photosynthetic and respiratory property regarding the size of Marimo's aggregation. Marimo Research 3:16–25.
- Yoshida, T., Nagao, M., Wakana, I. and Yokohama, Y. 1994. Photosynthetic and respiratory property in the large size spherical aggregations of "Marimo". Marimo Research 3:1–11.
- Yoshida, T., Horiguchi, T., Nagao, M., Wakana, I. and Yokohama, Y. 1998. Ultrastructural study of chloroplasts of inner layer cells of a spherical aggregation of "Marimo" (Chlorophyta) and structural changes seen in organelles after exposing to light. Marimo Research 7:1–13.
- Wakana, I. 1992. A bibliography relating to "Marimo" and their habitats. Marimo Research 1:1–12.
