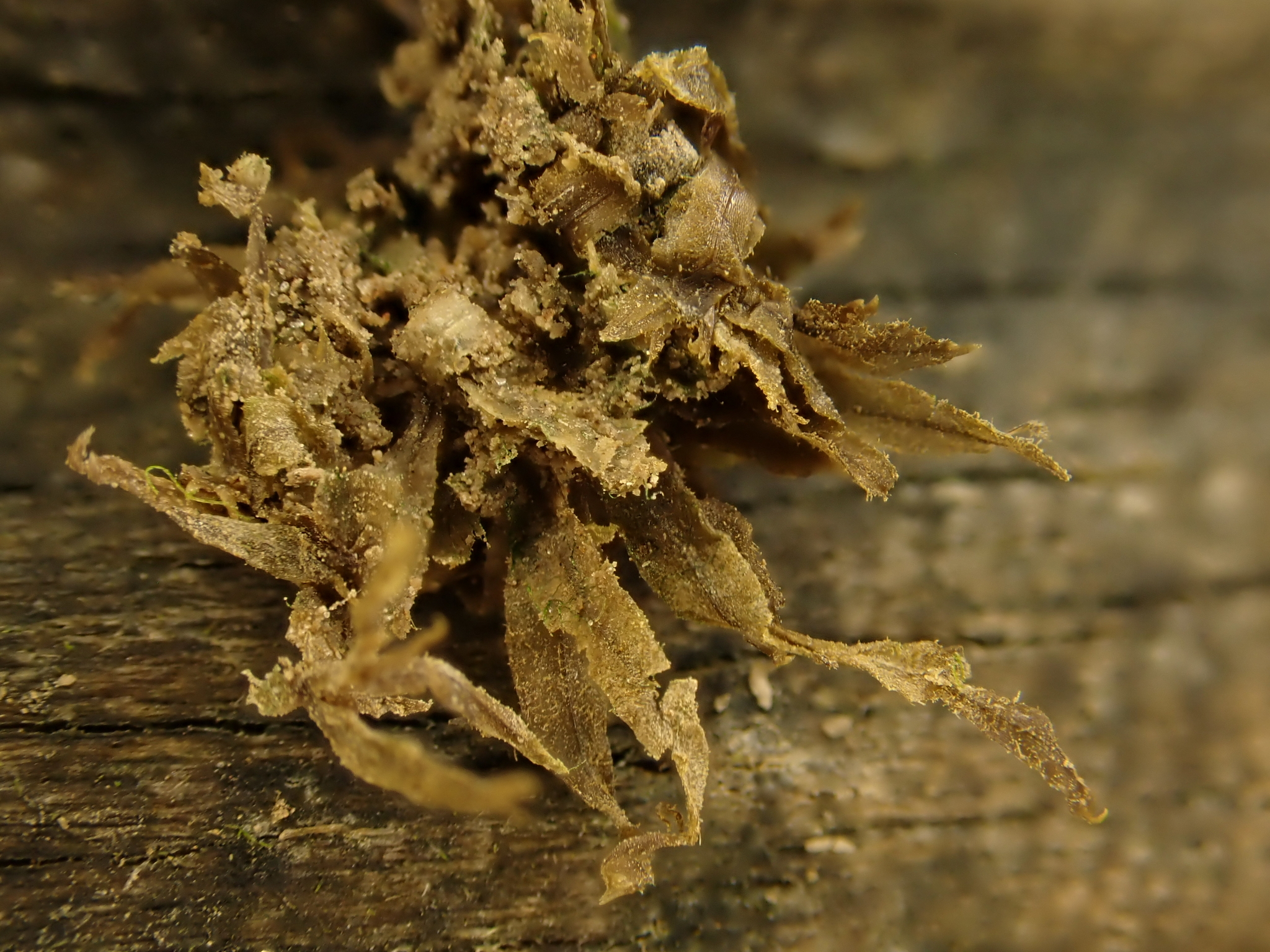
- Caloglossa vieillardii

Scientific classification
- Clade: Archaeplastida
- Division: Rhodophyta
- Class: Florideophyceae
- Order: Ceramiales
- Family: Delesseriaceae
- Genus: Caloglossa (Harvey) G.Martens

Synonyms
- Apiarium Durant, 1850

= Caloglossa =

Genus of algae

Caloglossa is a genus of algae in the Delesseriaceae.

== Description ==
Caloglossa has thalli that resemble branching leaves. This "exogenous primary branching" differentiates the genus from other members of the Delesseriaceae, other than the closely related genus Taenioma.

Species of Caloglossa are red to brown in color. Each thalli has a conspicuous midrib which is formed by a row of elongated cells. In fresh water, populations spread vegetatively. In brackish water, the plants may reproduce sexually.

== Distribution ==
Caloglossa is a common genus worldwide, and is distributed in littoral zones from tropical to temperate waters. They can grow in habitats of varying salinity, and may be found growing on stones on marine coasts, in brackish estuaries, epiphytically in saltmarsh and mangrove habitat, and in total freshwater areas.

== Use ==
The genus sees use in aquascaping and may be found in the aquarium trade. One species in particular, Caloglossa cf. beccarii, is popular as it exhibits a variety of colors and is easy to cultivate.

Caloglossa beccarii has also been investigated as a potential food item in Thailand. It was found to have insignificant toxicity while providing a potentially rich nutritional benefit.

== Taxonomy ==
Some authors have considered the taxon authority to be Jacob Georg Agardh instead of Georg Matthias von Martens. King & Puttock (1994) argued that Martens did not formally elevate Caloglossa to genus rank in his 1869 publication, preferring to follow Agardh's 1876 treatment instead. The diversity of species within Caloglossa has been heavily studied and subject to much revision. A mix of morphological and DNA analysis has informed researchers on the phylogeny of the genus.

As of 2024, are 22 species recognized by AlgaeBase.

- Caloglossa adhaerens R.J.King & Puttock
- Caloglossa apicula (Durant) Krayesky, Fredericq & J.N.Norris
- Caloglossa apomeiotica J.A.West & Zuccarello
- Caloglossa beccarii (Zanardini) De Toni
- Caloglossa bengalensis (G.Martens) R.J.King & Puttock
- Caloglossa confusa Krayesky, J.A.West & M.Kamiya
- Caloglossa continua (Okamura) R.J.King & Puttock
- Caloglossa fluviatilis Krayesky, Fredericq & J.N.Norris
- Caloglossa fonticola K.-P.Fang, F.-R.Nan & S.-L.Xie
- Caloglossa intermedia M.Kamiya & J.A.West
- Caloglossa kamiyana Freshwater, Cath.E.Miller & Frankovich
- Caloglossa leprieurii (Montagne) G.Martens
- Caloglossa manaticola Freshwater, Cath.E.Miller & Frankovich
- Caloglossa monosticha M.Kamiya
- Caloglossa ogasawaraensis Okamura
- Caloglossa postiae M.Kamiya & R.J.King
- Caloglossa rotundata M.Kamiya
- Caloglossa ruetzleri Krayesky, Fredericq & J.N.Norris
- Caloglossa saigonensis Tanaka & P.H.Hô
- Caloglossa stipitata E.Post
- Caloglossa triclada (Post) R.J.King & Puttock
- Caloglossa vieillardii (Kützing) Setchell
