= Aquarium furniture =

Various ornaments and functional items in an aquarium

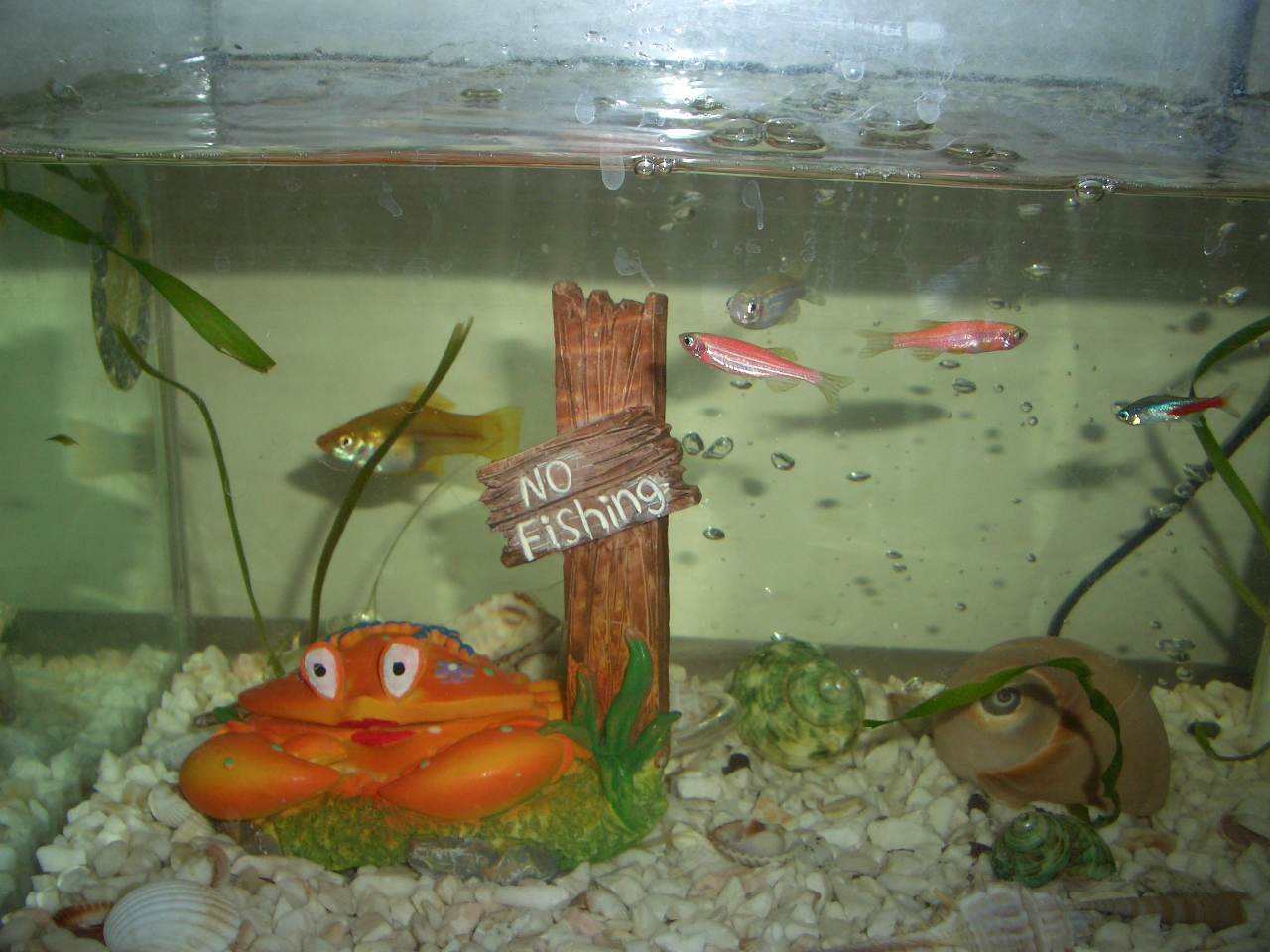
Home aquarium with typical decorations

Aquarium furniture or aquarium decor refers to the various ornaments and functional items that support an aquarium.

== Interior decorations ==
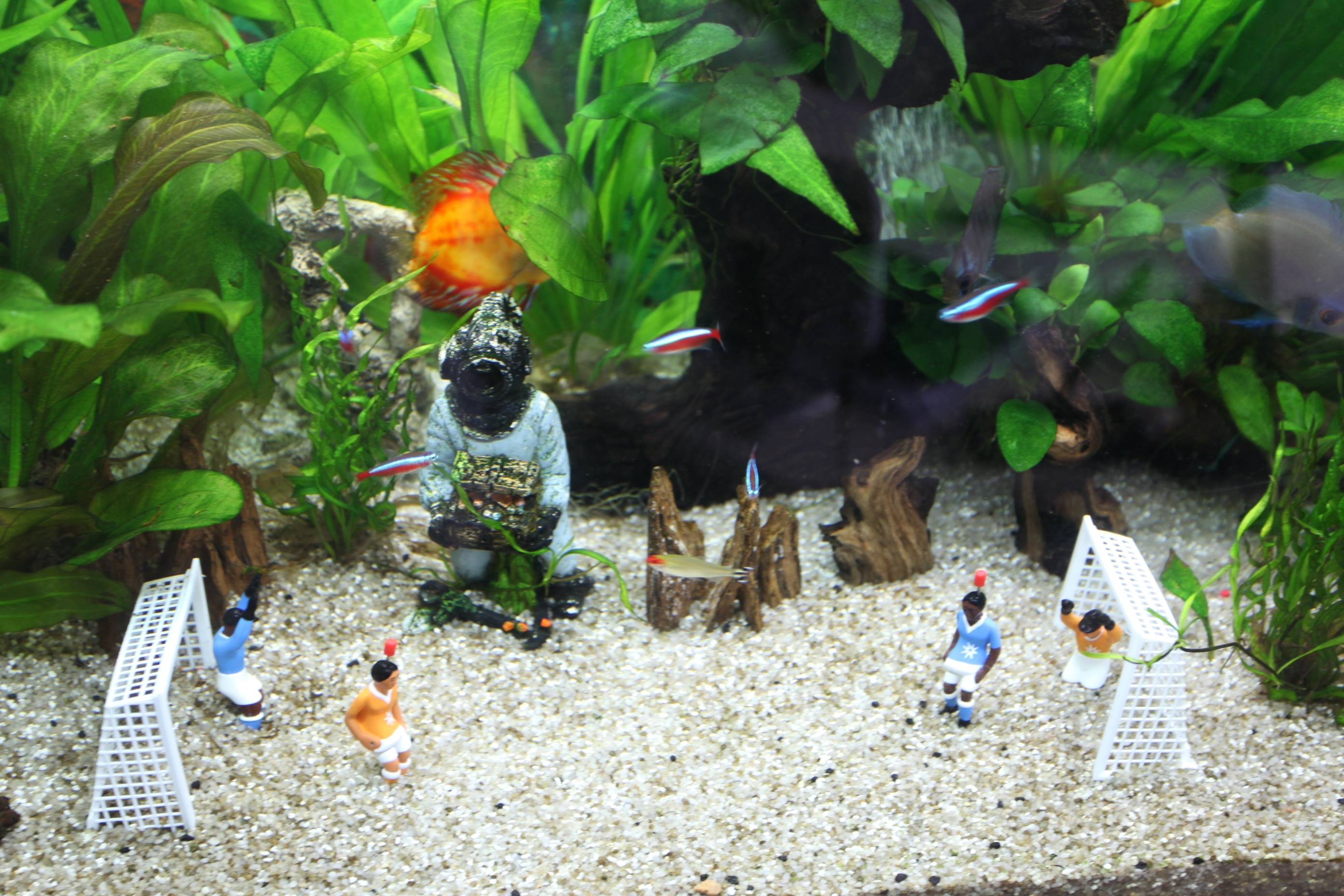
Tipp-Kick inspired aquarium decor

Ornamental aquarium furniture is used both for aesthetic reasons and to enrich the habitat and provide shelter for fish. Common types of aquarium furniture include artificial plants, caves, and themed decorations. Common tropes include treasure chests, shipwrecks, and vibrantly colored synthetic coral. Using ceramic objects as aquarium furniture is controversial to aquarists, as some types of ceramic glaze can leach heavy metals into aquarium water.

Examples of functional aquarium furniture include devices for removing algae from the glass (either a razor or a scouring pad, attached to the glass by a magnet), airstones, water filters, water heaters, and food dispensers.

== Exterior stands and cabinetry ==
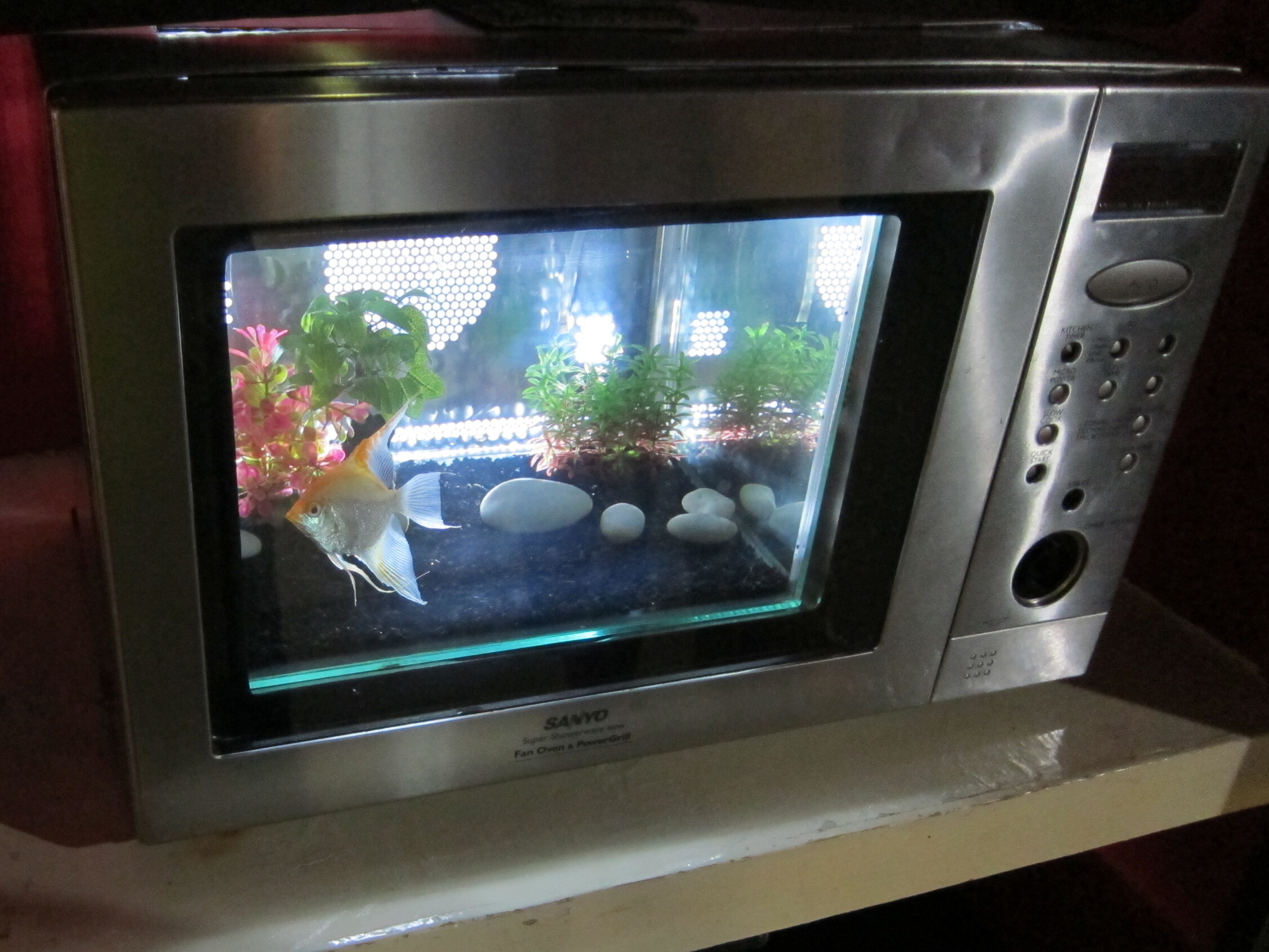
Aquarium inside a cabinet made from a microwave

Aquarium furniture may also refer to an item of (regular) furniture that features an aquarium in its design. A stand or cabinet that supports the aquarium may be considered aquarium furniture, as well as canopies which may contain metal halide lights.

Aquarium stands and canopies are often constructed to the same standards as high quality cabinetry. They can be custom built to not only support the tank itself, but to house control systems such as lights and pumps, and to provide storage for supplies.

== See also ==
- Live rock
- Reef aquarium
