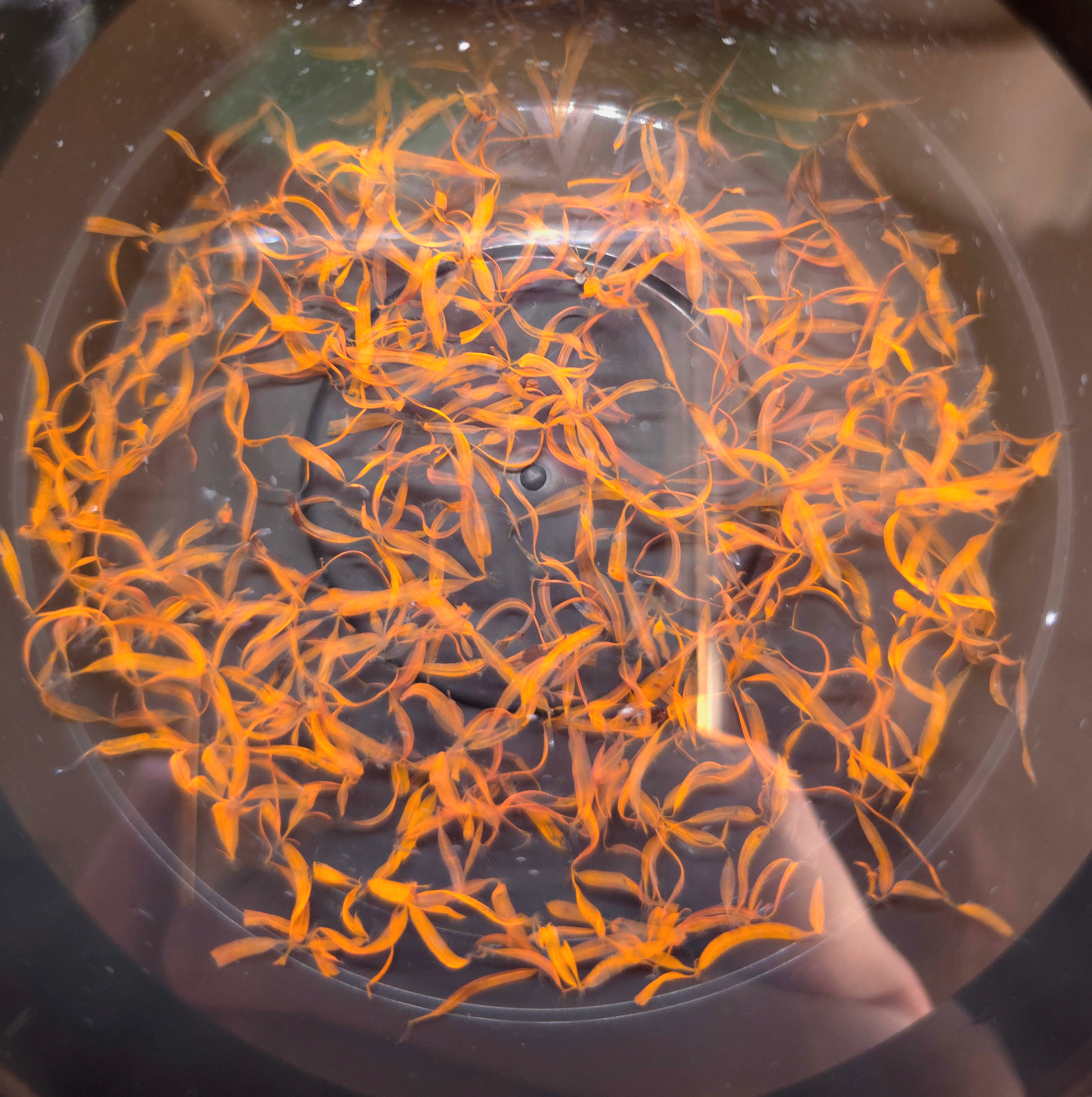
- Caloglossa beccarii inside of a black plastic tub

Scientific classification
- Domain: Eukaryota
- Clade: Archaeplastida
- Division: Rhodophyta
- Class: Florideophyceae
- Order: Ceramiales
- Family: Delesseriaceae
- Genus: Caloglossa
- Species: C. beccarii

Binomial name
- Caloglossa beccarii (Zanardini) De Toni

Synonyms
- Delesseria beccarii Zanardini

= Caloglossa beccarii =

Species of freshwater red algae

Caloglossa beccarii, known as red moss, is a species of red algae that may live in freshwater or brackish environments. While rare, it is sometimes found in the aquarium trade. Unlike most other freshwater algae, Caloglossa beccarii is intentionally grown and can be used in aquascape.

== Description ==
Caloglossa beccarii is a species of complex multicellular red algae. The plant has leafy branches that take on a range of colors depending on lighting and its specific environment. Shades include purple, purple-red, mauve, dark orange, and brown. The plant forms dense mats and has rhizoids which anchor it to surfaces. The plant's specific epithet honors the Italian botanist Odoardo Beccari.

== Distribution and habitat ==
Caloglossa beccarii is typically found on stones in coastal streams of Southeast Asia, the western Pacific, and northern Australia. Specifically, it may be found in Malaysia, Indonesia, Burma, Thailand, and Singapore. The species grows in association with mangrove trees.

== Uses ==
=== Aquascaping ===
Caloglossa beccarii is one of the few species of algae that is purposefully used in freshwater aquascaping. Although it was known to European aquarists since the 1990s, it wasn't identified until a 2004 assessment by Maike Lorenz, professor at the University of Goettingen. As an ornamental, the species is sought after for its coloration and habit of attaching itself to aquarium hardscape like rocks and wood. The plant is easy to cultivate, and if unchecked, may become weedy.

To aquarists, Caloglossa beccarii is misleadingly known as "red moss". In reality, the species is nowhere close to being a moss, having diverged from green plants at least 1.5 billion years ago. As an analogy, this would be like calling a cow a fungus.

=== As food ===
It has been proposed that Caloglossa beccarii has culinary potential. It is a source of trace minerals such as calcium, potassium, iron, magnesium, and manganese, as well as amino acids such as arginine, leucine, and glutamine. Additionally, the species is also high in ascorbic acid and antioxidants.

== Phylogeny ==
In the trade, it is often referred to as Caloglossa cf. beccarii as certain identification is difficult. A 2020 DNA barcoding study isolated C. beccarii from Taiwanese aquarium stores. The algae is most closely related to C. stipitata and C. fluviatilis.

== See also ==
- Marimo, another species of algae used in freshwater aquascaping
- List of freshwater aquarium plant species
- Freshwater aquarium algae
