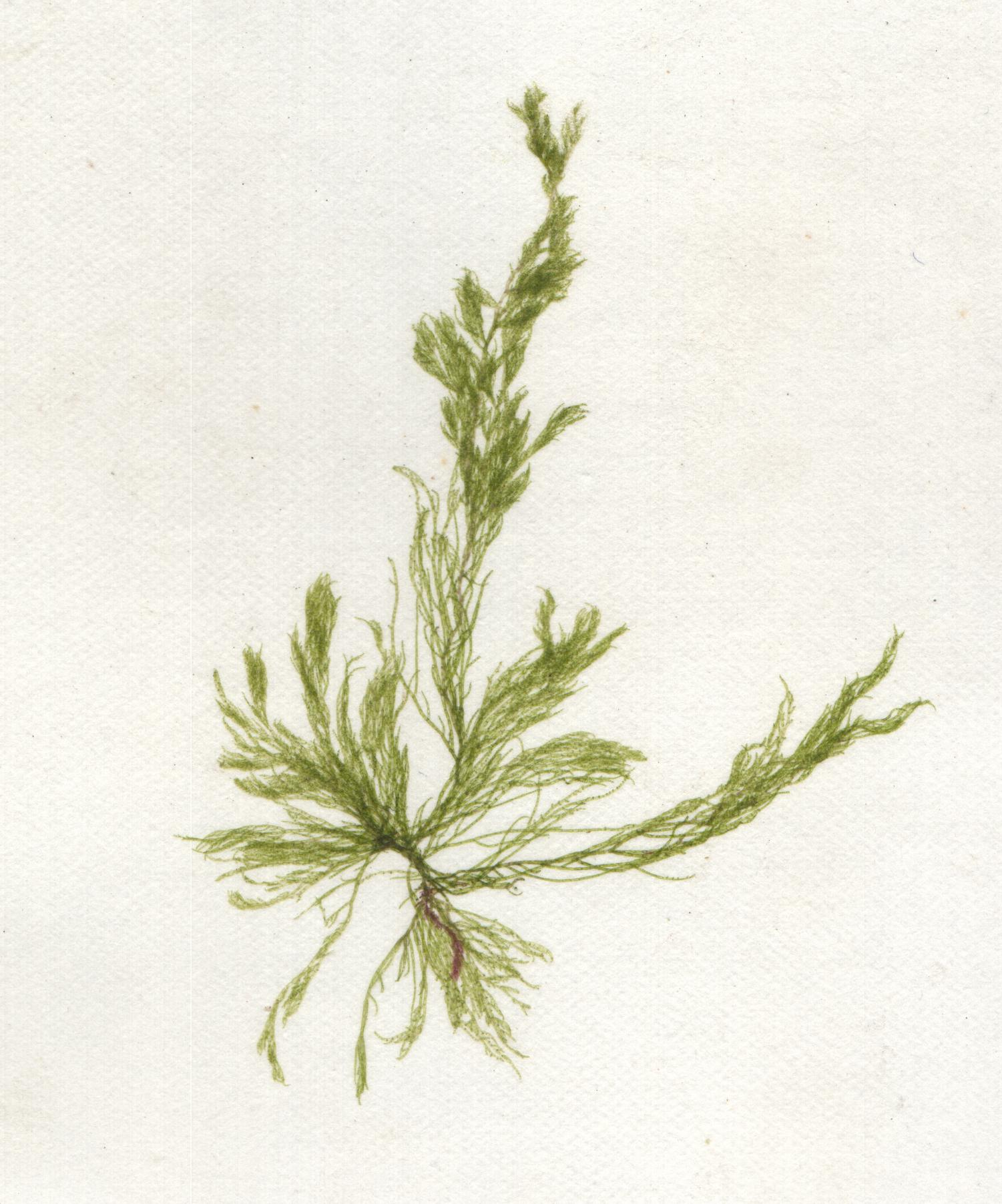
- Cladophora

Scientific classification
- Kingdom: Plantae
- Division: Chlorophyta
- Class: Ulvophyceae
- Order: Cladophorales
- Family: Cladophoraceae
- Genus: Cladophora; Kütz., 1843

Type species
- Cladophora oligoclona (Kützing) Kützing

Species
- Cladophora albida; Cladophora aokii; Cladophora brasiliana; Cladophora catenata; Cladophora columbiana; Cladophora crispata; Cladophora dalmatica; Cladophora fracta; Cladophora glomerata; Cladophora graminea; Cladophora laetevirens; Cladophora montagneana; Cladophora prolifera; Cladophora rivularis; Cladophora scopaeformis; Cladophora sericea; Cladophora socialis; Cladophora vagabunda

= Cladophora =

Genus of filamentous green algae

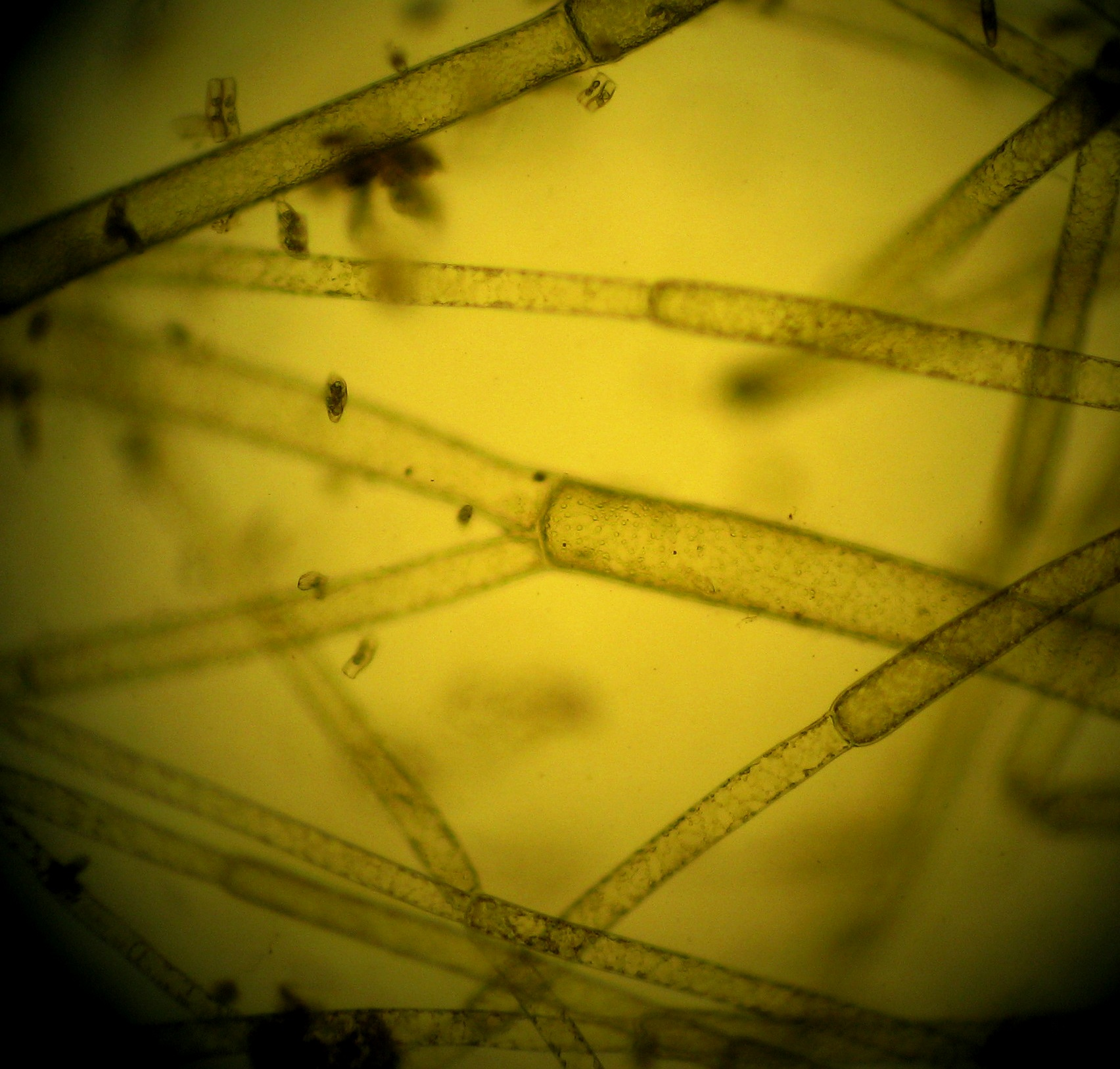
Cladophora glomerata, showing branching filaments and cellular structures

Cladophora is a genus of branching filamentous green algae in the class Ulvophyceae. They may be referred to as reticulated algae, branching algae, or blanket weed. The genus has a worldwide distribution, mainly found in marine or brackish waters; a few species are found in freshwater. It is harvested for use as a food and medicine.

== Description and appearance ==
Cladophora forms thalli consisting of branched, uniseriate (one cell thick) filaments which are usually sparsely to profusely branched (rarely without any branching). The thallus may be attached to a substrate via rhizoid cells produced by the basal cell, or by a simple disc-like holdfast; alternatively it may be unattached. Filaments are wider at the base and narrower near the tips. Cells produce a branch directly below the cross-wall, or may be pseudo-dichotomously branched. Cells are cylindrical, barrel-shaped or club-shaped.

The cells within Cladophora are large and multinucleate (with multiple nuclei) and have many parietal round chloroplasts each with a single pyrenoid, which usually join into a net-like reticular formation. Cladophora bright grass-green in color due to chlorophyll a, and chlorophyll b, in ratios similar to those of higher plant; it also contains β-carotene and xanthophylls. Thick-walled swollen cells, called akinetes, develop under unfavorable conditions. times of short photoperiods, low temperatures or nutrient unavailability. The cell walls of Cladophora species often contain cellulose and pectin, providing strength and flexibility.

The filaments can be quite long and may form dense mats or tufts in aquatic environments. When Cladophora becomes detached from the rocky substrate that it grows upon, it can then build up on shorelines, making their reticular formations, (dense mats) visible to onlookers. When dense mats form, this can affect light penetration and oxygen levels in aquatic ecosystems. Mats may also serve as habitat and food for various aquatic organisms.

Temperature, water currents and waves affect their metabolism and morphology, and branching patterns. At 15–20 °C branches appear alternate, they can also appear completely absent in temperatures below 25 °C.

== Life cycle ==
=== Asexual reproduction ===
This plant is annual and can reproduce through both sexual and asexual mechanisms. Some species have isogametic capacities but little is known about this and it seems to be a rare occurrence present in few species. The few cases that have occurred were in apical and sub apical un-specialized cells. Cladophora generally reproduces asexually using 2 flagellated zoospores using mitotic division and distal cells of side branches.

=== Sexual reproduction ===
This occurs when the male and female gametes fuse, usually in water. The fusion of gametes results in the formation of a diploid zygote. The diploid zygote undergoes mitotic divisions to form a diploid sporophyte. The sporophyte phase is often short-lived and less conspicuous. It produces haploid spores through meiosis. Haploid spores are released from the sporophyte and can be dispersed by water currents or other means. Haploid spores germinate to form new haploid gametophytes, completing the life cycle. Reproductive cells, often referred to as zoospores, are typically motile and possess flagella, allowing them to move in water.

Unlike Spirogyra the filaments of Cladophora branch and do not undergo conjugation.

There are two multicellular stages in its life cycle – a haploid gametophyte and a diploid sporophyte – which look highly similar. The only way to tell the two stages apart is to either count their chromosomes, or examine their offspring. The haploid gametophyte produces haploid gametes by mitosis and the diploid sporophyte produces haploid spores by meiosis. The only visible difference between the gametes and spores of Cladophora is that the gametes have two flagella and the spores have four.

== Habitat and distribution ==
Cladophora exist in multiple ecosystems which include both tropical and moderate climates, freshwater, wastewater, and marine water ecosystems, and in multiple biomes which include lakes, ponds, dam reservoirs, large rivers and the coastal littoral zones as well as in areas of oceanic depth (which determines temperatures and light availability as well as oxygen availability, which can become a limiting factor). This taxon needs nitrates, and orthophosphates, as well as hard water conditions with pH levels between 7–10, high light intensity and nutrient densities that are rich in nature. Cladophora may attach to submerged surfaces like rocks or other aquatic substrates, enabling it to grow more rapidly through optimization of space availability, (another limiting factors and source of infraspecific, intraspecies and interspecies competition).

In Europe, only 15 known subtypes of Cladophora are freshwater. Cladophora exists in Africa, Asia, the Pacific Islands, Australia, Europe, the Atlantic Islands, North America, New Zealand, as well as the Caribbean. In some Asian countries, almost 5% of human diets are algae, and its consumption is popular in France, Thailand, as well as the Hawaiian Islands.

Cladophora balls are formed from the filaments of the algae which are photosynthetic. Large numbers of these balls were thrown ashore in Devon, England. They had an average diameter of 2.5 cm and several million balls were found forming a layer.

== Ecological impact ==
The genus Cladophora is cosmopolitan and accordingly infestations cannot often be regarded logically as being invasive. Where they occur they may at various times be seen as beneficial, as a nuisance, or an outright pest.

Modest growth of Cladophora is generally harmless; the growth is an important food for many fish and other aquatic animals, as a buffer for the sequestration of nutrients in the water body and for protection of some aquatic organisms from solar ultraviolet radiation. Cladophora species can be an environmental nuisance, however, causing major alterations to benthic conditions linked particularly with increased phosphorus loading.

Where Cladophora becomes a pest is generally where special circumstances cause such drastic overgrowth that algal blooms develop and form floating mats. Typical examples include where hypertrophication or high mortality of rival organisms produce high concentrations of dissolved phosphorus. Extensive floating mats prevent circulation that is necessary for the aeration of deeper water and, by blocking the light, they kill photosynthesising organisms growing beneath. The mats interfere with the fishing industry by clogging nets and preventing the use of lines. Where they wash ashore the masses of rotting material reduce shoreline property values along water bodies such as the Great Lakes in the United States.

Quagga mussel populations have increased tremendously during the same time frame as the blooming of Cladophora, though their ecological relationships are not yet clear and may be complex.

== Phytoremediation and bioindication ==
Some Cladophora species, including Cladophora fascicularis, have been investigated for their use in phytoremediation. Cladophora fascicularis may contribute to improving water quality in contaminated aquatic ecosystems. This algae is biologically active. Cladophora possesses unprecedented capacities to filter toxins from water such as heavy metals and pollutants and efficiently absorb nutrients, including nitrogen and phosphorus.

Cladophora is known for its blooming activities which are seasonal, (early spring to summer) and indicate their eutrophic abilities as well as that pollution may be present in the environment that they are growing within.

== Uses ==
=== Food ===
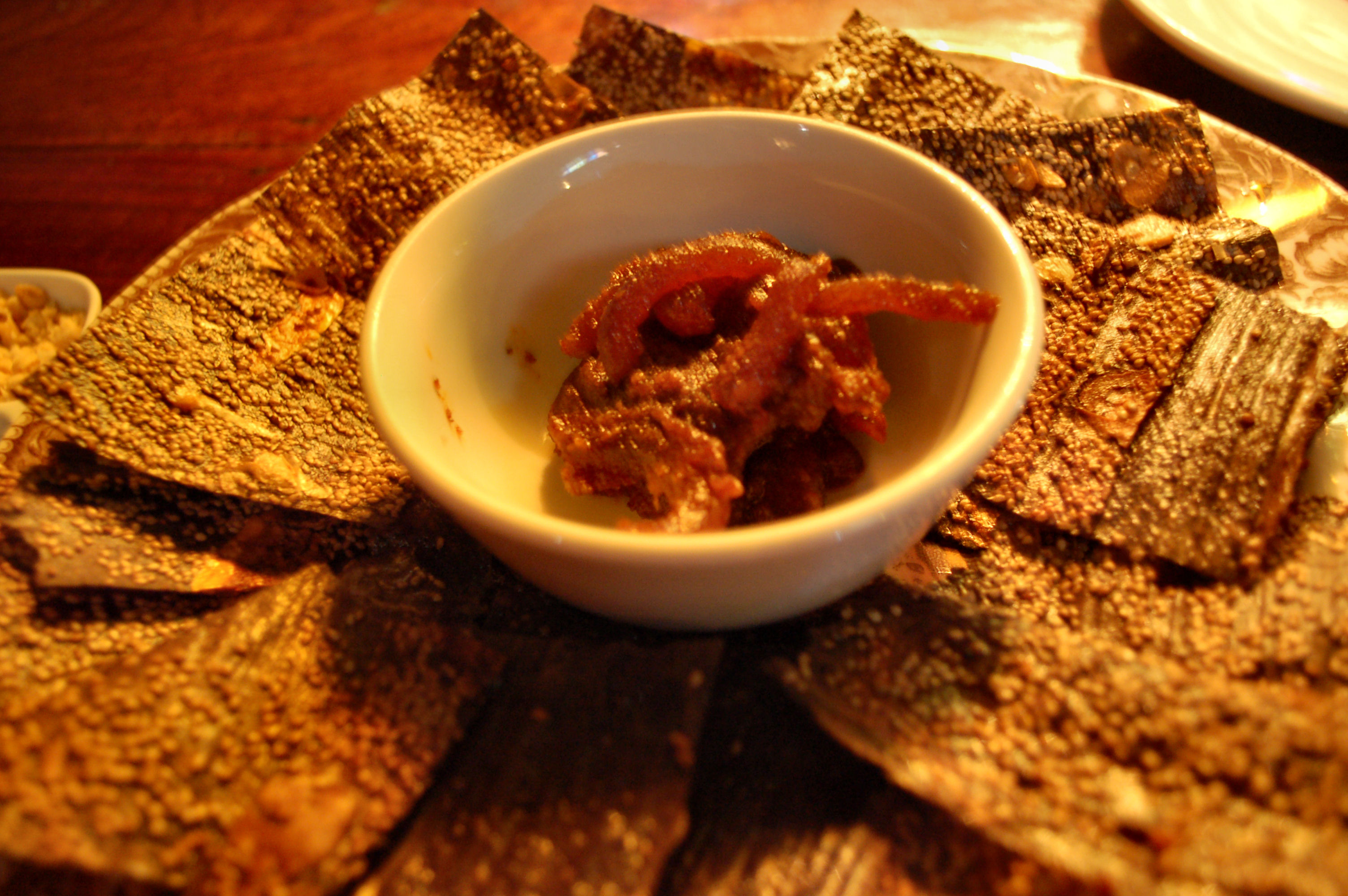
Kháy phen served as an appetizer dish

Cladophora can be eaten as a food item either dried or fresh, however it loses some of its nutritional value with increased processing and with genetic modification. It is considered a carbohydrate when consumed.

In Laos, Cladophora are commonly eaten as a delicacy and usually known in English under the name "Mekong weed". The algae grow on underwater rocks and thrive in clear spots of water in the Mekong river basin. They are harvested 1 to 5 months a year and most often eaten in dry sheets similar to Japanese nori, though much cruder in their format. Luang Prabang's speciality is dry khai with sesame (kaipen), while Vang Vieng is famous for its roasted kháy sheets. They can be eaten in strips as an appetizer, with a meal or as a snack with Beer Lao. Kaipen are the most readily available form of Mekong weed and are famous throughout the country and in the neighbouring Isaan, though difficult to find beyond Vientiane. Mekong weed can also be eaten raw, in soups, or cooked in steamed curries.

=== Biofuel ===
Trans-esterification of Cladophora can be used to transform it into biodiesel. Alcohols and enzymes and Cladophora oils are used to form this reaction, but production is often highly dependent on oil content.

=== Pharmacology ===
Cladophora has pharmacological uses as medication. Cladophora is purported to have antimicrobial, antihistamine, antiviral, antioxidant, anti-sclerosis, anti-inflammatory and weight loss properties as well as secondary metabolites and bioactive components that have uses in diabetes, hypertension, cancer, and serves as a protection from parasites. However, as of December 2023, Cladophora has yet to be utilized commercially as a pharmacological agent.

=== Other uses ===
There is an additional demand for Cladophora for biomass productivity with utilization commercially as material for value added products. It can be used for cosmetic application and used as a fertilizer. Marimo used to be classified in Cladophora, though is now called Aegagropila linnaei. Algae balls are significant in the hobby aquarium trade.

== Taxonomy and selected species ==
As of 2025, AlgaeBase accepts 190 species within the genus Cladophora.

Cladophora has had a long and complicated taxonomic history. It was first described by Friedrich Traugott Kützing in 1843, who described many new species and varieties based on minor differences in morphology; subsequent authors did the same, resulting in hundreds of species names. However Cladophora displays extensive phenoplastic plasticity in response to different environmental conditions; the same plant may have a drastically different appearance in fresh or salt water. In the 20th century, Christian van den Hoek and other authors synonymized many names, gradually reducing the number of accepted species. On the other hand, molecular data has shown that Cladophora contains cryptic diversity. Therefore, it is difficult to know the true number of Cladophora species.

The simple morphology of Cladophora has independently evolved multiple times in the order Cladophorales, making it polyphyletic. Taxonomic studies including molecular phylogenetics have begun to split Cladophora into smaller monophyletic genera, but the resulting genera often overlap significantly in terms of morphology.

Some species include:

- Cladophora albida
- Cladophora aokii
- Cladophora brasiliana
- Cladophora catenata
- Cladophora columbiana
- Cladophora crispata
- Cladophora dalmatica
- Cladophora fracta
- Cladophora glomerata
- Cladophora graminea
- Cladophora graminea
- Cladophora montagneana
- Cladophora prolifera
- Cladophora rivularis
- Cladophora scopaeformis
- Cladophora sericea
- Cladophora socialis
- Cladophora vagabunda

Related genera with species formerly included in Cladophora are:

- Pseudocladophora
- Aegagropila (Aegagropila linnaei (marimo) was formerly placed here as Cladophora aegagropila)
- Aegagropilopsis
- Leliaertia
- Lychaete
- Vandenhoekia
- Willeella
- Lurbica
- Rama
