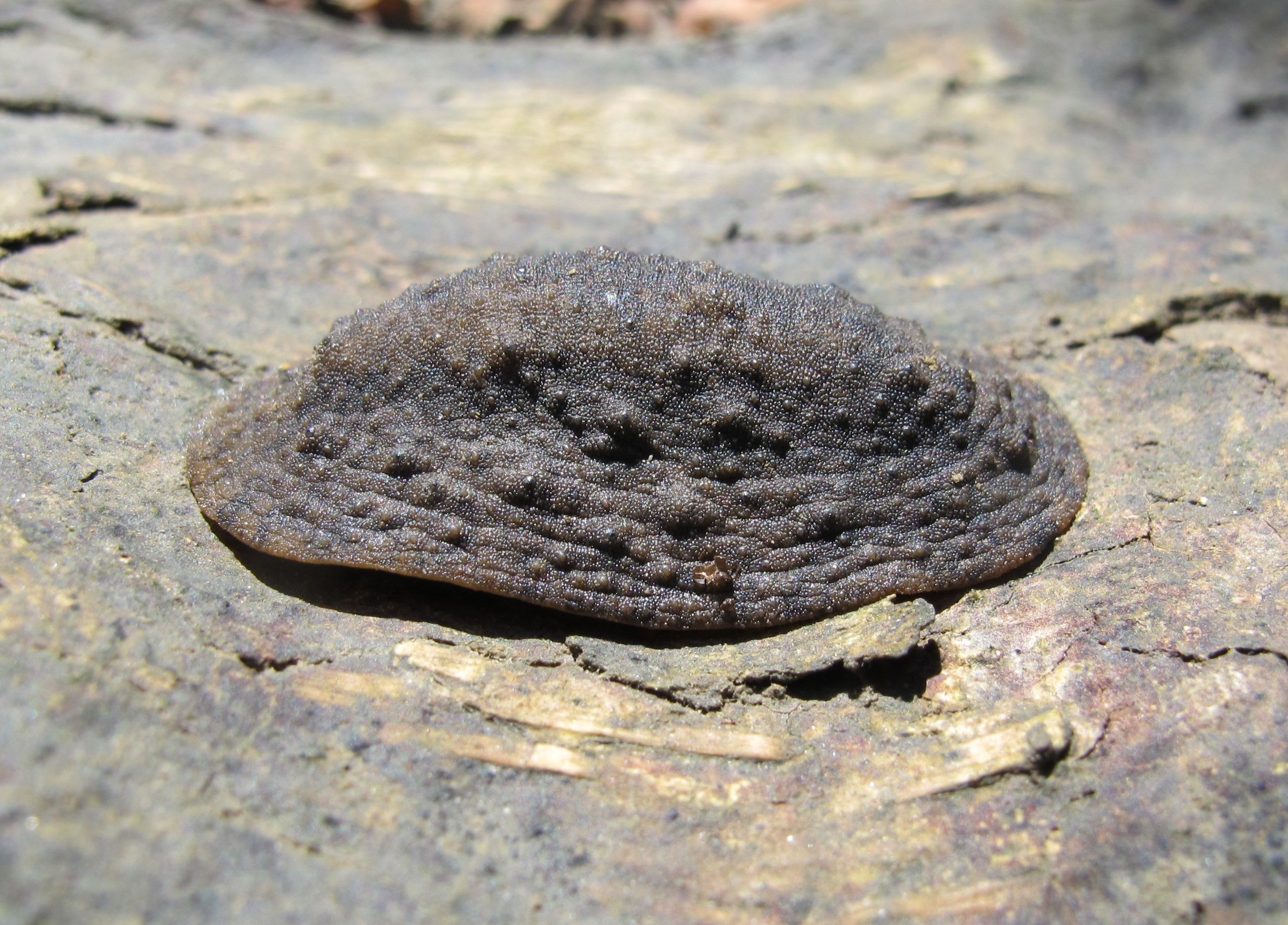
- Platevindex slug on a mangrove tree in Darwin, Australia

Scientific classification
- Kingdom: Animalia
- Phylum: Mollusca
- Class: Gastropoda
- Order: Systellommatophora
- Superfamily: Onchidioidea
- Family: Onchidiidae
- Genus: Platevindex; Baker, 1938

Type species
- Onchidium coriaceum C. Semper, 1882

Synonyms
- Oncis Plate, 1893 (invalid: junior homonym of Oncis Herrmannsen, 1847)

= Platevindex =

Genus of gastropods

Platevindex is a genus of air-breathing sea slugs, a shell-less marine pulmonate gastropod mollusks in the family Onchidiidae.

Platevindex slugs live in intertidal habitats of the Indo-West Pacific. Most Platevindex species are found in mangrove forests, but some species may be found in salt marshes or on coral rubble near mangrove trees. These slugs are characterized by their dorso-ventrally flattened body and a very narrow foot.

== Species ==
According to the World Register of Marine Species (WoRMS), the following species with valid names are included within the genus Platevindex :

- Platevindex amboinae (Plate, 1893)
- Platevindex applanatus (Simroth, 1920)
- Platevindex aptei Goulding & Dayrat, 2021
- Platevindex burnupi (Collinge, 1902)
- Platevindex cinereus (Odhner, 1917) (nomen dubium, based on nomen dubium)
- Platevindex coriaceus (Semper, 1882)
- Platevindex latus (Plate, 1893)
- Platevindex luteus (Semper, 1882)
- Platevindex martensi (Plate, 1893)
- Platevindex mortoni Britton, 1984 (nomen dubium)
- Platevindex tigrinus (Stoliczka, 1869)

Species brought into synonymy

- Platevindex condorianus (Rochebrune, 1882): synonym of Platevindex coriaceus coriaceus (Semper, 1882)
- Platevindex coriaceum (C. Semper, 1882): synonym of Platevindex coriaceus (C. Semper, 1882) (incorrect gender ending of specific epithet)
- Platevindex granulosus (Lesson, 1826): synonym of Onchidium granulosum Lesson, 1826
- Platevindex inspectabilis Plate, 1893: synonym of Platevindex martensi (Plate, 1893)
- Platevindex schneideri Hoffmann, 1932: synonym of Platevindex luteus (Semper, 1882)
- Platevindex semperi Plate, 1893: synonym of Platevindex coriaceus coriaceus (Semper, 1882)
- Platevindex stuxbergi (Westerlund, 1883): synonym of Onchidium stuxbergi (Westerlund, 1883)
- Oncis coeca Plate, 1893: synonym of Platevindex amboinae (Plate, 1893)
