= Onchidium papuanum =

Scientific classification
- Kingdom: Animalia
- Phylum: Mollusca
- Class: Gastropoda
- Order: Systellommatophora
- Family: Onchidiidae
- Genus: Onchidium
- Species: O. papuanum

Binomial name
- Onchidium papuanum Semper, 1880

Synonyms
- Paraoncidium papuanum (C. Semper, 1880)

Species of gastropod

Paraoncidium papuanum is a species of air-breathing sea slug, a shell-less marine pulmonate gastropod mollusc in the family Onchidiidae.
