= Onchidella reticulata =

Scientific classification
- Kingdom: Animalia
- Phylum: Mollusca
- Class: Gastropoda
- Order: Systellommatophora
- Family: Onchidiidae
- Genus: Onchidella
- Species: O. reticulata

Binomial name
- Onchidella reticulata (Semper, 1885)

Synonyms
- Onchidium reticulatum Semper, 1885

Species of gastropod

Onchidella reticulata is a species of air-breathing sea slug, a shell-less marine pulmonate gastropod mollusk in the family Onchidiidae.
