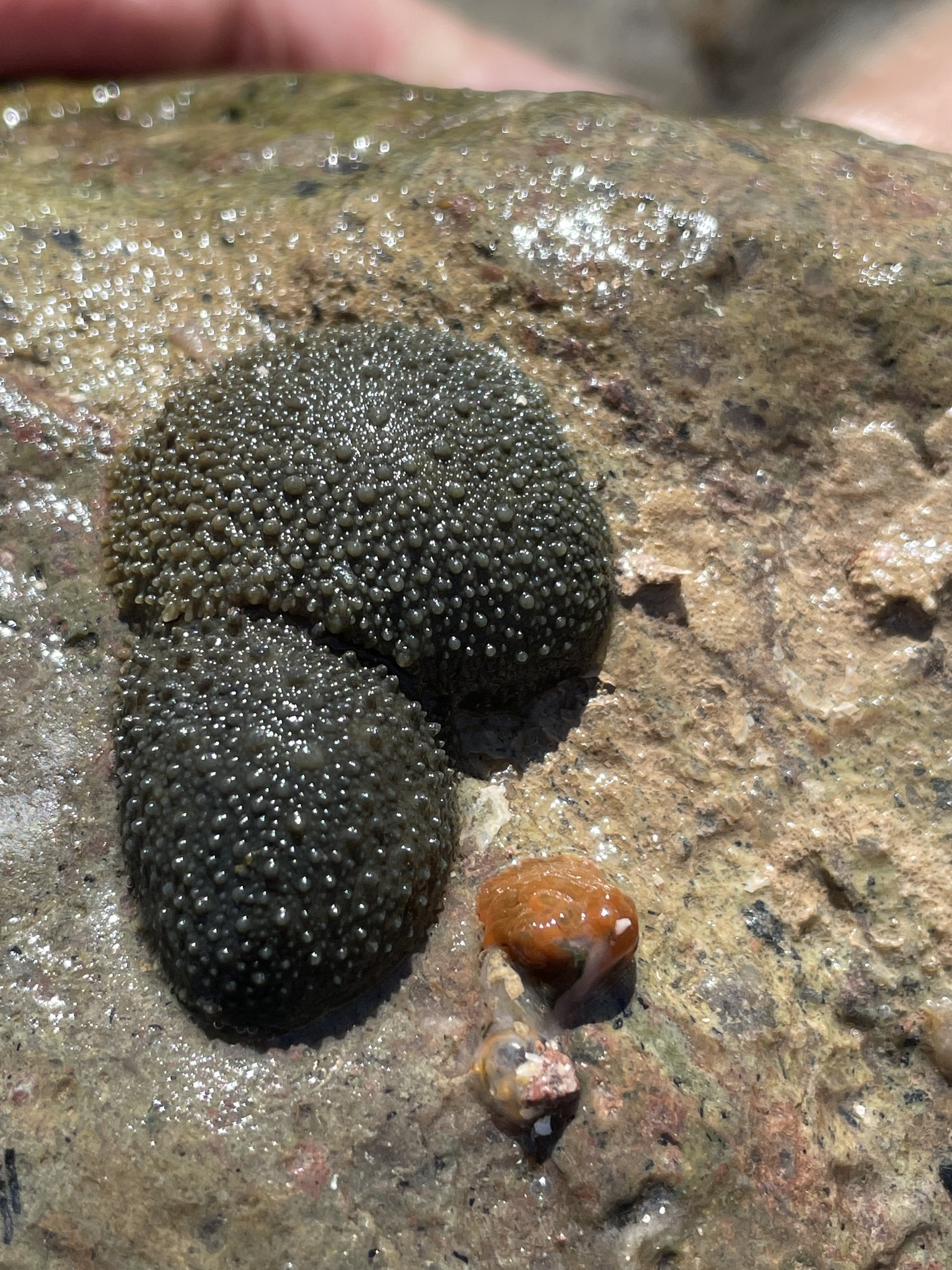
- Dorsal view
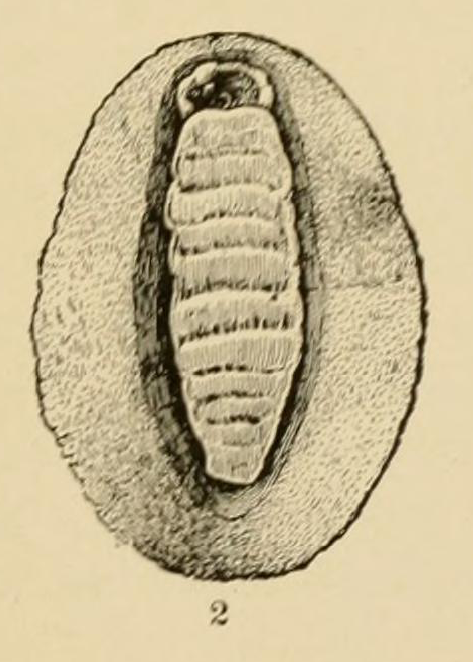
- Ventral view

Scientific classification
- Kingdom: Animalia
- Phylum: Mollusca
- Class: Gastropoda
- Order: Systellommatophora
- Family: Onchidiidae
- Genus: Onchidella
- Species: O. binneyi

Binomial name
- Onchidella binneyi Stearns, 1894

Synonyms
- Onchidella carpenteri Stearns, 1879 nec Binney, 1861; Onchidium carpenteri Semper, 1885 nec Binney, 1861; Oncidiella hildae Hoffmann, 1928

= Onchidella binneyi =

Species of gastropod

Onchidella binneyi, also known as Onchidella carpenteri, Onchidium carpenteri, and Oncidiella hildae, is a species of air-breathing sea slug, a shell-less marine pulmonate gastropod mollusk in the family Onchidiidae.

== Description ==
The Onchidella binneyi are dark grey sea slugs around 2-3 centimeters in length. They produce a defensive secretion as protection against predators because of the absence of the typical defense mechanism of other gastropods, an external shell. This defensive secretion contains the compound Onchidal, which acts as a feeding deterrent. Released after the initial attack, the effect on the predator is irreversible. Onchidal causes the predator to forego the sea-slug as a meal option. The toxicity level to predators and humans is not well known.

== Distribution ==
This species is found along the western coast of the Pacific from the Bahia de Los Angeles in the Gulf of California to Ecuador. Onchidella binneyi are found in the upper intertidal zones of rocky shores. They cannot be on the lower levels because they do not have strong enough grips to withstand the rising and falling tides and the harsh wave activity that occurs in the rocky intertidal zone.

== Behavior ==
O. binneyi feeding and general activity patterns have strong correlations with the rise and fall of the tides. When the tide is low, there is often a burst of activity among the sea slug as they come out to feed. They are most active at night, when they are exposed to air. This is because they lack any adaptation that allows them to clamp tightly to rocks on the intertidal zones. Therefore, when wave surges happen on the shore, they are easily dislodged. Alternatively, when tides are high, O. binneyi activity is lessened and their presence is sparse.

== Importance ==
Onchidal, when isolated from the defensive secretion of the Onchidella binneyi, has demonstrated growth inhibition of Staphylococcus aureus. This means it is a compound to inhibit Gram-positive bacteria. This is important because of its antimicrobial activity, which means it can help prevent disease.

O. binneyi performs naturally cytotoxic activities that have a significant effect on lymphocytic leukemia cell growth in humans. They also have substantial growth inhibition for colon cancer cells, epidermoid carcinoma cells, breast cancer cells, and many more. With these agents, anti-tumor drugs can be produced and usher in a new type of cancer treatment. They also produce anti-inflammatory and lipid lowering effects. This means that they are able to lower cholesterol levels in humans.
