= Semperoncis glabra =

Scientific classification
- Kingdom: Animalia
- Phylum: Mollusca
- Class: Gastropoda
- Order: Systellommatophora
- Family: Onchidiidae
- Genus: Semperoncis
- Species: S. glabra

Binomial name
- Semperoncis glabra (Semper, 1885)

Synonyms
- Onchidium glabrum Semper, 1885

Species of gastropod

Semperoncis glabra is a species of air-breathing sea slug, a shell-less marine pulmonate gastropod mollusk in the family Onchidiidae.
