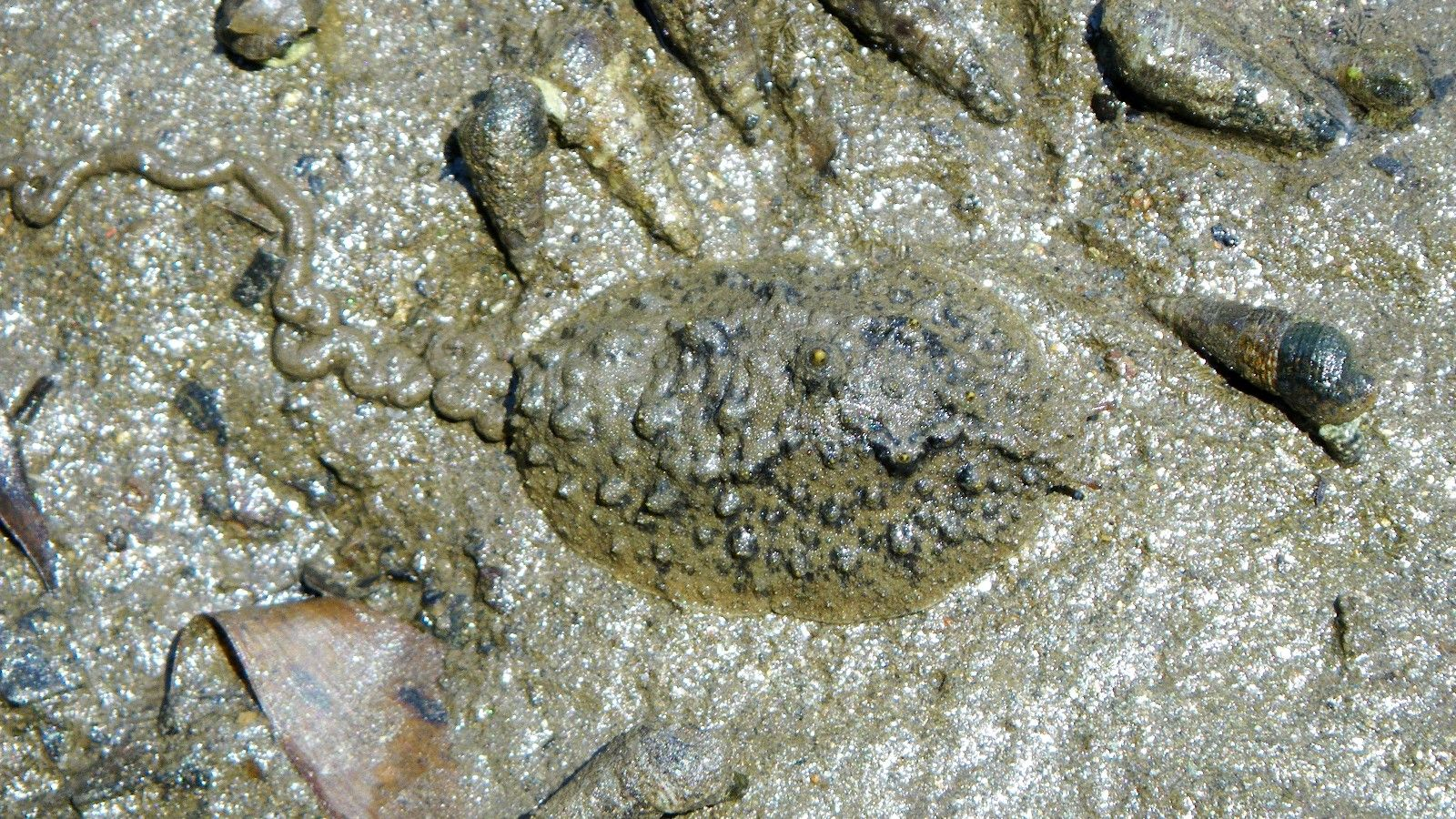
- Dorsal view of Paromoionchis tumidus in the mud (head is on the right).

Scientific classification
- Kingdom: Animalia
- Phylum: Mollusca
- Class: Gastropoda
- Order: Systellommatophora
- Family: Onchidiidae
- Genus: Paromoionchis
- Species: P. tumidus

Binomial name
- Paromoionchis tumidus (Semper, 1880)

= Paromoionchis tumidus =

Species of gastropod

Paromoionchis tumidus is a species of small, air-breathing sea slug, a shell-less marine pulmonate gastropod mollusc in the family Onchidiidae.

== Distribution ==
Paromoionchis tumidus is widely distributed in the Indo-Pacific from Japan in the north, to Hong Kong, Vietnam, the Philippines, Brunei Darussalam, Singapore, Peninsular Malaysia, the Andaman Islands, Indonesia, and Australia (New South Wales, Northern Territory, Queensland).

== Synonymized names ==
The following names have been synonymized with Paromoionchis tumidus:

- Onchidium samarense Semper, 1880
- Onchidium mertoni Simroth, 1918
- Onchidium hongkongense Britton, 1984
