= Onchidium laevigatum =

Scientific classification
- Kingdom: Animalia
- Phylum: Mollusca
- Class: Gastropoda
- Order: Systellommatophora
- Family: Onchidiidae
- Genus: Onchidium
- Species: O. laevigatum

Binomial name
- Onchidium laevigatum Cuvier, 1817

Species of gastropod

Onchidium laevigatum is a species of air-breathing sea slug, a shell-less marine pulmonate gastropod mollusk in the family Onchidiidae.
