= Onchidella steindachneri =

Scientific classification
- Kingdom: Animalia
- Phylum: Mollusca
- Class: Gastropoda
- Order: Systellommatophora
- Family: Onchidiidae
- Genus: Onchidella
- Species: O. steindachneri

Binomial name
- Onchidella steindachneri (Semper, 1885)

Synonyms
- Onchidium steindachneri Semper, 1885

Species of gastropod

Onchidella steindachneri is a species of air-breathing sea slug, a shell-less marine pulmonate gastropod mollusk in the family Onchidiidae.

== Distribution ==
This species is distributed in the Pacific Ocean along the Galapagos Islands
