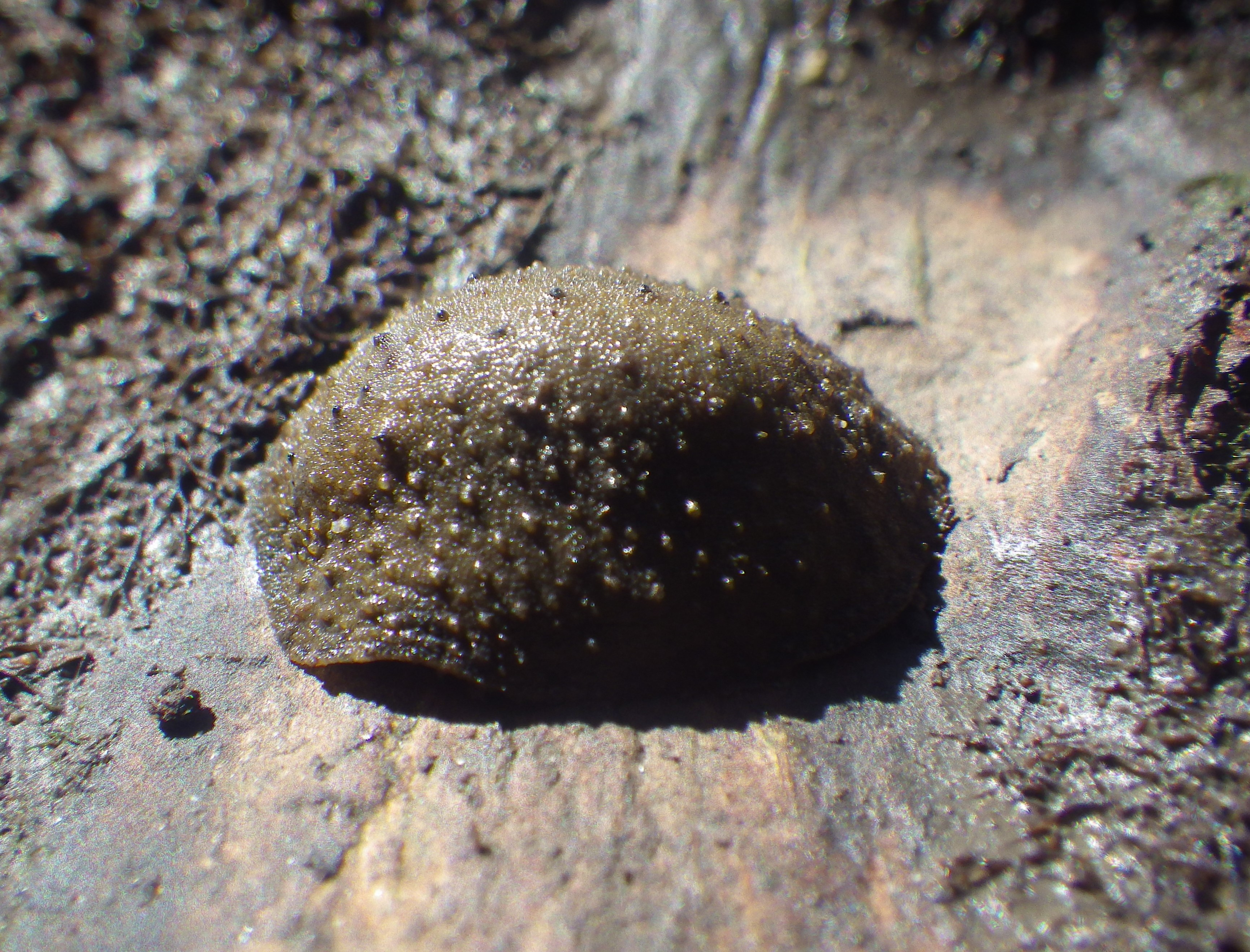

Scientific classification
- Kingdom: Animalia
- Phylum: Mollusca
- Class: Gastropoda
- Order: Systellommatophora
- Family: Onchidiidae
- Genus: Platevindex
- Species: P. luteus

Binomial name
- Platevindex luteus (Semper, 1880)

Synonyms
- Onchidium luteum Semper, 1880

= Platevindex luteus =

Species of gastropod

Platevindex luteus is a species of air-breathing sea slug, a shell-less marine pulmonate gastropod mollusk in the family Onchidiidae.

== Description ==
Platevindex luteus specimens are often between 10 and 20 millimeters in length. Its dorsal colouration is typically on a range between brown and nearly black, though yellowish-brown slugs have been found. Its ventral side, however, ranges from dark blue to grey to white. The species is typically found flattened, though when disturbed it may become "almost hemispherical."

The notum of the slug is bumpy with prominent papillae. Often, the notum will be covered in dried mud. The species has dorsal photoreceptors ("dorsal eyes") on its papillae, although these may not always be visible. Typically, a specimen will have between 10 and 22 papillae with photoreceptors, though specimens have been found with up to 35. The eyes can be distributed across the entire notum, though they are not present at the edges of the mantle.

== Distribution ==
Platevindex luteus is found in the Indo-West Pacific region, and specimens have been found in Australia, Brunei, Indonesia, Papua New Guinea, the Philippines, Singapore, and Vietnam.

The slug is found in mangrove forests, or at the boundaries of mangroves. Typically, it is found on dead logs or on tree trunks, though some specimens have been found on tree roots, under loose bark, under rocks, on pieces of wood and plant material, and in dark mud.
