= Onchidium palaense =

Scientific classification
- Kingdom: Animalia
- Phylum: Mollusca
- Class: Gastropoda
- Order: Systellommatophora
- Family: Onchidiidae
- Genus: Onchidium
- Species: O. palaense

Binomial name
- Onchidium palaense Semper, 1885

Synonyms
- Paraoncidium palaense (Semper, 1885)

Species of gastropod

Onchidium palaense is a species of air-breathing sea slug, a shell-less marine pulmonate gastropod mollusc in the family Onchidiidae.
