= Onchidium multiradiatum =

Scientific classification
- Kingdom: Animalia
- Phylum: Mollusca
- Class: Gastropoda
- Order: Systellommatophora
- Family: Onchidiidae
- Genus: Onchidium
- Species: O. multiradiatum

Binomial name
- Onchidium multiradiatum Semper, 1885

Species of gastropod

Onchidium multiradiatum is a species of air-breathing sea slug, a shell-less marine pulmonate gastropod mollusk in the family Onchidiidae.
