= Paromoionchis daemelii =

Scientific classification
- Kingdom: Animalia
- Phylum: Mollusca
- Class: Gastropoda
- Order: Systellommatophora
- Family: Onchidiidae
- Genus: Paromoionchis
- Species: P. daemelii

Binomial name
- Paromoionchis daemelii (C. Semper, 1880)

Synonyms
- Onchidium daemelii C. Semper, 1880; Onchidium dämelii C. Semper, 1880

Species of gastropod

Paromoionchis daemelii is a species of air-breathing sea slug, a shell-less marine pulmonate gastropod mollusk in the family Onchidiidae.
