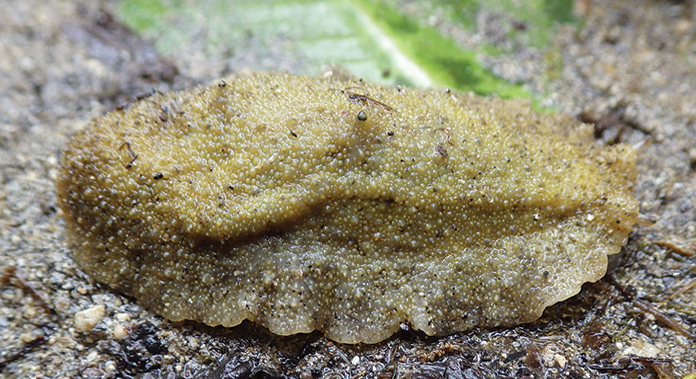

Scientific classification
- Kingdom: Animalia
- Phylum: Mollusca
- Class: Gastropoda
- Order: Systellommatophora
- Family: Onchidiidae
- Genus: Wallaconchis
- Species: W. graniferus

Binomial name
- Wallaconchis graniferus (Semper, 1885)

Synonyms
- Onchidium graniferum C. Semper, 1880 (original combination); Oncidium graniferum C. Semper, 1880 (superseded combination); Oncis granifera C. Semper, 1880 (superseded combination); Paraoncidium graniferum (C. Semper, 1885); Wallaconchis graniferum (C. Semper, 1880) (wrong gender agreement of specific epithet)

= Wallaconchis graniferus =

Species of gastropod

Wallaconchis graniferus is a species of air-breathing sea slug, a shell-less marine pulmonate gastropod mollusk in the family Onchidiidae.

== Distribution ==
Wallaconchis graniferus is known from the Philippines and Indonesia.
