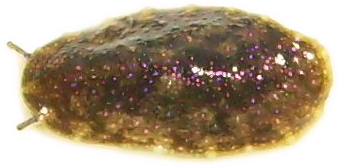
- Onchidella nigricans
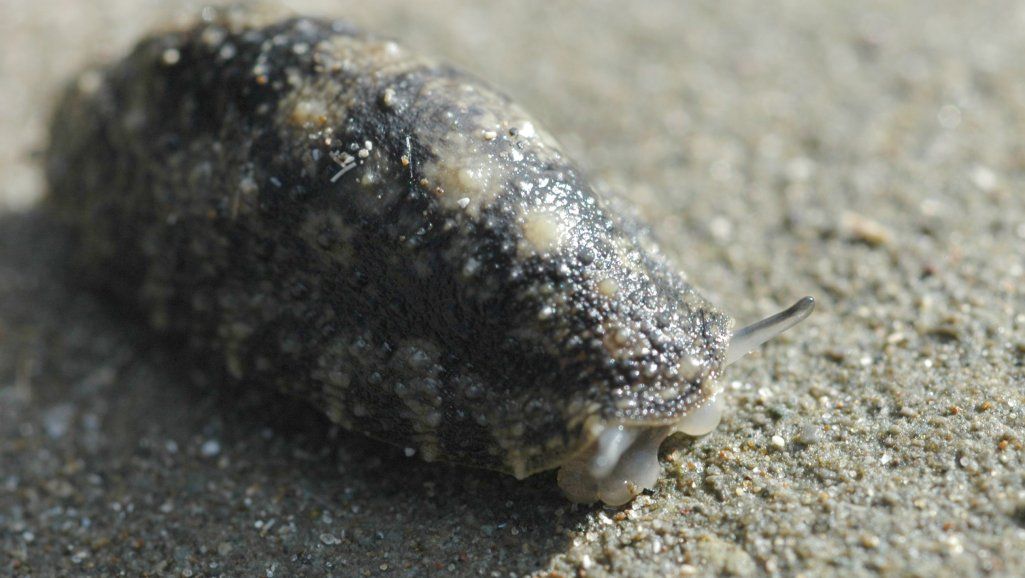
- Onchidella sp. at Murrays Bay, Auckland, New Zealand

Scientific classification
- Kingdom: Animalia
- Phylum: Mollusca
- Class: Gastropoda
- Order: Systellommatophora
- Family: Onchidiidae
- Genus: Onchidella; Gray, 1850

Species
- See text

Synonyms
- Arctonchis Dall, 1905; Occidentella Hoffmann, 1929; Oncidiella Crosse & P. Fischer, 1878; Peronella Mörch, 1863 (Invalid: junior homonym of Peronella Gray, 1855 [Echinodermata]); Peroniella Starobogatov, 1976

= Onchidella =

Genus of gastropods

Onchidella is a genus of small, air-breathing sea slugs, shell-less marine pulmonate gastropod molluscs in the family Onchidiidae.

== Species ==
According to the World Register of Marine Species (WoRMS), the following species with valid names are included within the genus Onchidella :

- Onchidella accrensis (Plate, 1893)
- Onchidella armadilla (Mörch, 1863)
- Onchidella binneyi Stearns, 1894
- Onchidella borealis Dall, 1871 - northwest Onchidella
- Onchidella brattstroemi Ev. Marcus, 1978
- Onchidella campbelli Filhol, 1880
- Onchidella carpenteri (W. G. Binney, 1860) (nomen dubium)
- Onchidella celtica (Cuvier, 1817)
- Onchidella flavescens Wissel, 1904
- Onchidella floridana (Dall, 1885) - Florida Onchidella
- Onchidella incisa (Quoy & Gaimard, 1832)
- Onchidella indolens (Couthouy in Gould, 1852)
- Onchidella kurodai (Taki, 1935)
- Onchidella maculata (Plate, 1893)
- Onchidella marginata (Couthouy in Gould, 1852)
- Onchidella miusha Ev. Marcus, 1978
- Onchidella monodi (Gabe, Prenant & Sourie, 1951)
- Onchidella nigricans (Quoy & Gaimard, 1832)
- Onchidella oniscioides (Blainville, 1816)
- Onchidella orientalis (Taki, 1935)
- Onchidella pachyderma (Plate, 1893)
- Onchidella philippei Ev. Marcus, 1979
- Onchidella reticulata (Semper, 1885)
- Onchidella souriei (Gabe & Prenant, 1955)
- Onchidella steindachneri (J. O. Semper, 1882) - Galapagos Islands
- Onchidella wah Ev. Marcus, 1978

Synonymized species

- Onchidella capensis - South Africa : synonym of Onchidella maculata (Plate, 1893)
- Onchidella chilensis (Huppé in Gay, 1854) accepted as Checked: verified by a taxonomic editorOnchidella marginata (Couthouy in Gould, 1852)
- Onchidella condoriana Rochebrune, 1882 : synonym of Oncis stuxbergi (Westerlund, 1883)
- Onchidella griseofusca Tapparone-Canefri, 1874 accepted as Onchidium griseofuscum (Tapparone-Canefri, 1874)
- Onchidella griseo-fusca Tapparone Canefri, 1874 accepted as Unreviewed: has not been verified by a taxonomic editorOnchidium griseofuscum (Tapparone Canefri, 1874)
- Onchidella hardwickii Gray, 1850 accepted as Onchidium hardwickii (Gray, 1850)
- Onchidella hildae (Hoffmann, 1928): synonym of Onchidella binneyi Stearns, 1894
- Onchidella irrorata (Gould, 1852) accepted as Onchidella nigricans (Quoy & Gaimard, 1832)
- Onchidella juanfernandeziana (Wissel, 1898) accepted as Onchidella marginata (Couthouy in Gould, 1852)
- Onchidella nigra Gray, 1850 accepted as Scaphis atra (Lesson, 1830)
- Onchidella obscura (Plate, 1893) accepted as Onchidella nigricans (Quoy & Gaimard, 1832)
- Onchidella patelloida (Quoy & Gaimard, 1832) accepted as Onchidella nigricans (Quoy & Gaimard, 1832)
- Onchidella patelloides (Quoy & Gaimard, 1832) : synonym of Onchidella nigricans (Quoy & Gaimard, 1832)
- Onchidella pulchella Watson, 1925 accepted as Onchidella maculata (Plate, 1893)
- Onchidella reevesii Reeve in J.E. Gray, 1850 accepted as Paraoncidium reevesii (Reeve in J.E. Gray, 1850)
- Onchidella remanei Er. Marcus & Ev. Marcus, 1956 accepted as Onchidella celtica (Cuvier, 1817)
