= Marmaronchis vaigiensis =

Scientific classification
- Kingdom: Animalia
- Phylum: Mollusca
- Class: Gastropoda
- Order: Systellommatophora
- Family: Onchidiidae
- Genus: Marmaronchis
- Species: M. vaigiensis

Binomial name
- Marmaronchis vaigiensis (Quoy & Gaimard, 1825)

Synonyms
- Onchidium ambiguum C. Semper, 1880; Onchidium leopoldi Labbé, 1934; Onchidium steenstrupii C. Semper, 1882; Onchidium vaigiense Quoy & Gaimard, 1825; Oncidium leopoldi Labbé, 1934; Paraoncidium vaigiense (Quoy & Gaimard, 1825)

Species of gastropod

Marmaronchis vaigiensis is a species of air-breathing sea slug, a shell-less marine pulmonate gastropod mollusc in the family Onchidiidae.
