= Onchidella souriei =

Scientific classification
- Kingdom: Animalia
- Phylum: Mollusca
- Class: Gastropoda
- Order: Systellommatophora
- Family: Onchidiidae
- Genus: Onchidella
- Species: O. souriei

Binomial name
- Onchidella souriei (Gabe & Prenant, 1955)

Synonyms
- Oncidiella souriei Gabe & Prenant, 1955

Species of gastropod

Onchidella souriei is a species of air-breathing sea slug, a shell-less marine pulmonate gastropod mollusk in the family Onchidiidae.
