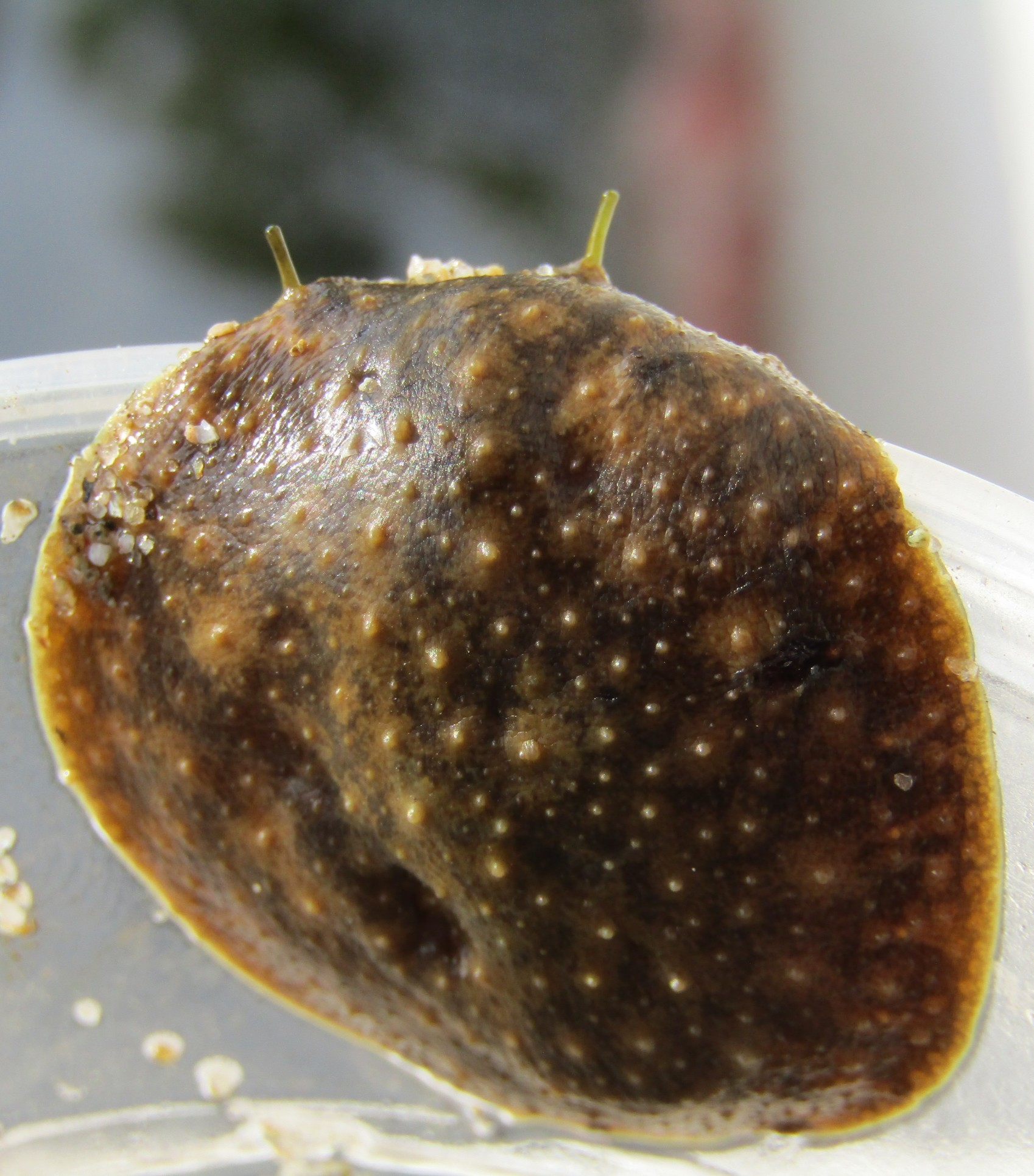

Scientific classification
- Kingdom: Animalia
- Phylum: Mollusca
- Class: Gastropoda
- Order: Systellommatophora
- Family: Onchidiidae
- Genus: Hoffmannola
- Species: H. hansi

Binomial name
- Hoffmannola hansi Ev. Marcus & Er. Marcus, 1967

= Hoffmannola hansi =

Species of gastropod

Hoffmannola hansi is a species of air-breathing sea slug, a shell-less marine pulmonate gastropod mollusk in the family Onchidiidae.

== Description ==
In the original description of Hoffmannola hansi the authors Eveline Marcus and Ernst Marcus examine different specimens, noting that "The biggest slug is 48mm long measured over the back (26mm lineal), 20 mm broad and 16 mm high."

The species is named after the German zoologist Hans Hoffmann.

== Distribution ==
Hoffmannola hansi is a species of air-breathing sea slug, a species which occurs in the Pacific coast of Mexican, from the Gulf of California (Baja California Norte, Sonora, Sinaloa) to Oaxaca.
