= Onchidella kurodai =

Scientific classification
- Kingdom: Animalia
- Phylum: Mollusca
- Class: Gastropoda
- Order: Systellommatophora
- Family: Onchidiidae
- Genus: Onchidella
- Species: O. kurodai

Binomial name
- Onchidella kurodai (Taki, 1935)

Synonyms
- Oncidiella kurodai Taki, 1935

Species of gastropod

Onchidella kurodai is a species of air-breathing sea slug, a shell-less marine pulmonate gastropod mollusk in the family Onchidiidae.
