= Hoffmannola lesliei =

Scientific classification
- Kingdom: Animalia
- Phylum: Mollusca
- Class: Gastropoda
- Order: Systellommatophora
- Family: Onchidiidae
- Genus: Onchidium
- Species: O. lesliei

Binomial name
- Onchidium lesliei (Stearns, 1892)

Synonyms
- Onchidium lesliei Stearns, 1892

Species of gastropod

Hoffmannola lesliei is a species of air-breathing sea slug, a shell-less marine pulmonate gastropod mollusk in the family Onchidiidae.
