= Onchidella incisa =

Scientific classification
- Kingdom: Animalia
- Phylum: Mollusca
- Class: Gastropoda
- Order: Systellommatophora
- Family: Onchidiidae
- Genus: Onchidella
- Species: O. incisa

Binomial name
- Onchidella incisa (Quoy & Gaimard, 1832)

Synonyms
- Onchidium incisum Quoy & Gaimard, 1832

Species of gastropod

Onchidella incisa is a species of air-breathing sea slug, a shell-less marine pulmonate gastropod mollusk in the family Onchidiidae.
