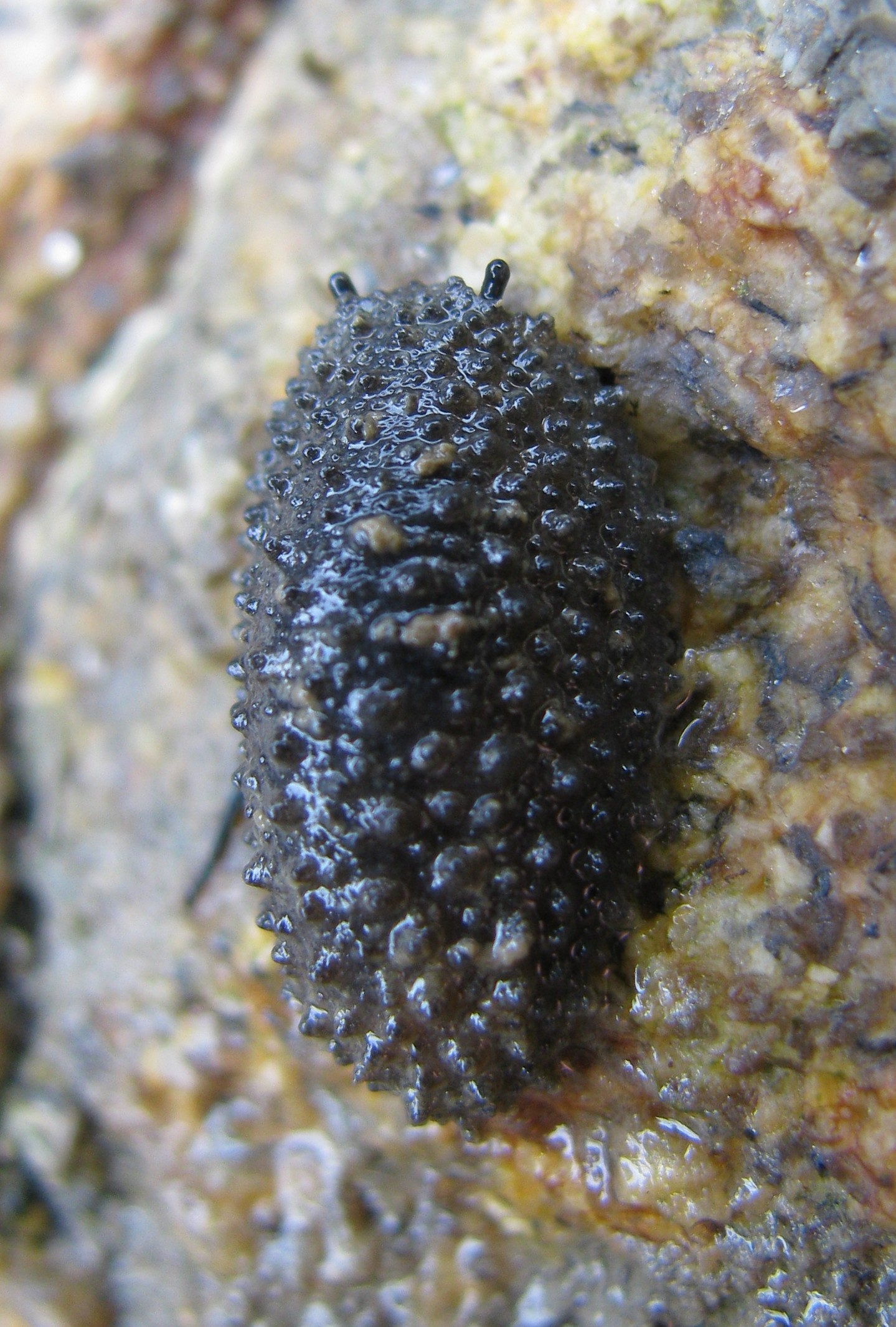
- live Onchidella celtica

Conservation status
- Least Concern (IUCN 3.1)

Scientific classification
- Kingdom: Animalia
- Phylum: Mollusca
- Class: Gastropoda
- Order: Systellommatophora
- Family: Onchidiidae
- Genus: Onchidella
- Species: O. celtica

Binomial name
- Onchidella celtica (Cuvier, 1817

Synonyms
- Onchidella remanei Er. Marcus & Ev. Marcus, 1956; Onchidium celticum Cuvier in Audouin & Milne-Edwards, 1832; Onchidium nanum Philippi, 1844; Onchidium tuberculatum Taslé, 1870; Peronia parthenopeia delle Chiaje, 1841

= Onchidella celtica =

Species of gastropod

Onchidella celtica is a species of air-breathing sea slug, a shell-less marine pulmonate gastropod mollusk in the family Onchidiidae.

The complete nucleotide sequence of the mitochondrial genome of Onchidella celtica has been available since 2008.

== Description ==
Onchidella celtica is up to 12 mm (0.47 in) long and its oval body has a deep olive to black colour. The mantle is covered with large tubercles which concealed the head and the foot of the animal when motionless. The eyes are at the tips of two short and thick tentacles and are visible from above when the animal is crawling.

== Distribution ==
This species occurs locally on the East Atlantic coastline, from western Scotland, western England and the Channel Islands, south to Spain and the Azores, including:

- Great Britain
- Coastline of Brittany

== Habitat and ecology ==
This air-breathing sea slug lives in the intertidal zone on rocky shorelines. It is exposed on rocky shores at low tides and retreats to crevices when the tide rises. It can absorb small amounts of dioxygen through its mantle, allowing it to stay submerged during high tide. However, this secondary "breathing" doesn't allow it to be active underwater. Onchidella celtica hibernates during winter.

It lives gregariously in sheltered crevices during high tide, and travel to feed during high tide. This species shows a "homing" ability, as it returns to its same crevice at every high tide.

This sea slug feeds on small algae and diatoms. It is noted that sand and detritus is engulfed when feeding, helping it grind its food as a physical help for digestion.

When bothered, Onchidella celtica can squirt out a repulsive substance.

== Reproduction ==
This species is hermaphrodite, using reciprocal mating to produce between 60 and 100 tubular eggs gathered as a jelly mass. It reproduces during the summer. Hatchings resembles small adults.
