= Semperoncis huberti =

Scientific classification
- Kingdom: Animalia
- Phylum: Mollusca
- Class: Gastropoda
- Order: Systellommatophora
- Family: Onchidiidae
- Genus: Semperoncis
- Species: S. huberti

Binomial name
- Semperoncis huberti (Labbé, 1934)

Synonyms
- Semperella huberti Labbé, 1934

Species of gastropod

Semperoncis huberti is a species of air-breathing sea slug, a shell-less marine pulmonate gastropod mollusk in the family Onchidiidae.
