= Onchidella pachyderma =

Scientific classification
- Kingdom: Animalia
- Phylum: Mollusca
- Class: Gastropoda
- Order: Systellommatophora
- Family: Onchidiidae
- Genus: Onchidella
- Species: O. pachyderma

Binomial name
- Onchidella pachyderma (Plate, 1893)

Synonyms
- Oncidiella pachyderma Plate, 1893

Species of gastropod

Onchidella pachyderma is a species of air-breathing sea slug, a shell-less marine pulmonate gastropod mollusk in the family Onchidiidae.
