= Onchidella armadilla =

Scientific classification
- Kingdom: Animalia
- Phylum: Mollusca
- Class: Gastropoda
- Order: Systellommatophora
- Family: Onchidiidae
- Genus: Onchidella
- Species: O. armadilla

Binomial name
- Onchidella armadilla (Mörch, 1863)

Synonyms
- Onchidium schrammi Bland & Binney, 1874; Onchis armadilla Mörch, 1863

Species of gastropod

Onchidella armadilla is a species of air-breathing sea slug, a shell-less marine pulmonate gastropod mollusk in the family Onchidiidae.

== Distribution ==
This species is distributed in the Caribbean Sea and the Lesser Antilles
