= Onchidella accrensis =

Scientific classification
- Kingdom: Animalia
- Phylum: Mollusca
- Class: Gastropoda
- Order: Systellommatophora
- Family: Onchidiidae
- Genus: Onchidella
- Species: O. accrensis

Binomial name
- Onchidella accrensis (Plate, 1893)

Synonyms
- Oncidiella accrensis Plate, 1893

Species of gastropod

Onchidella accrensis is a species of air-breathing sea slug, a shell-less marine pulmonate gastropod mollusk in the family Onchidiidae.

== Description ==
This species was first described by Ludwig Hermann Plate in 1893.

== Distribution ==
Reinhold Wilhelm Buchholz collected the specimens used for the first scientific description of this species on the sea off Accra, Ghana.
