= Platevindex burnupi =

Scientific classification
- Kingdom: Animalia
- Phylum: Mollusca
- Class: Gastropoda
- Order: Systellommatophora
- Family: Onchidiidae
- Genus: Platevindex
- Species: P. burnupi

Binomial name
- Platevindex burnupi Collinge, 1902

Species of gastropod

Platevindex burnupi is a species of air-breathing sea slug, a shell-less marine pulmonate gastropod mollusk in the family Onchidiidae.

== Distribution ==
South Africa and Madagascar.
