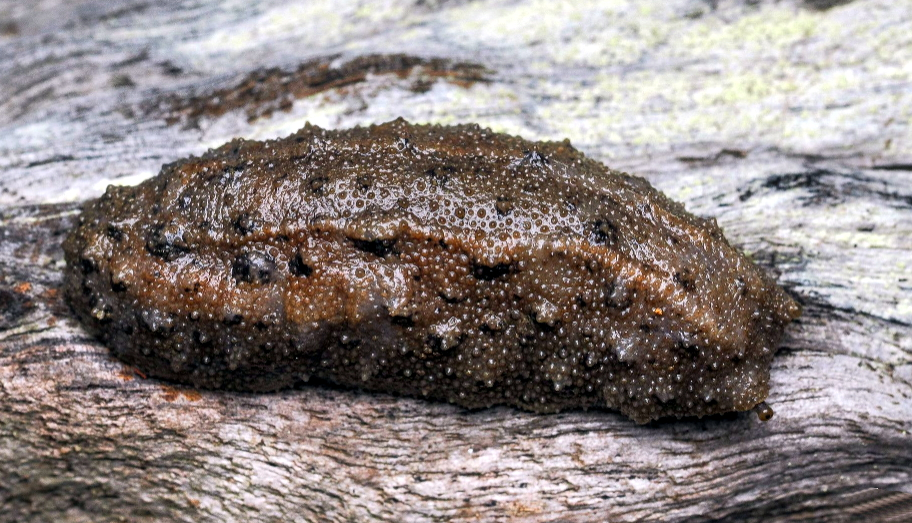
- Onchidina australis

Scientific classification
- Kingdom: Animalia
- Phylum: Mollusca
- Class: Gastropoda
- Order: Systellommatophora
- Family: Onchidiidae
- Genus: Onchidina; Semper, 1885
- Species: O. australis

Binomial name
- Onchidina australis (Semper, 1880)

Synonyms
- Genus: Oncidina Plate, 1893; Paraoncidium Labbé, 1934 unavailable name (no type species designated); Paraoncidium Starobogatov, 1976; Species: Onchidella australis C. Semper, 1880; Onchidina chameleon (Brazier, 1886); Onchidium chameleon Brazier, 1886; Paraoncidium chameleon (Brazier, 1886)

= Onchidina =

Genus of gastropods

Onchidina is a monotypic genus of air-breathing sea slugs, a shell-less marine pulmonate gastropod molluscs in the family Onchidiidae.

Its sole member is the species Onchidina australis. Uniquely within the Onchidiidae, O. australis lives above the tidal zone in a fully terrestrial habitat.

== Description ==
(Original description of Onchidina australis) The dorsal surface of the mollusk is strongly convex, while the ventral surface is flat. The dorsal mantle surface exhibits strong, irregular granulation, lacking any evidence of pseudobranchiae. Larger tubercles are distributed irregularly, spaced approximately 3-4 mm apart. The dorsal coloration is yellowish-gray, interspersed with darker speckles and dots. Two more or less indistinct bands of spots traverse the dorsal surface longitudinally, maintaining a consistent distance from each other and from the mantle margin. The larger tubercles on the dorsal surface are whitish. The ventral surfaces of the foot and head display a yellowish or reddish-gray coloration. The ventral surface of the mantle is blue-gray, bordered by a narrow yellowish band.

== Distribution ==
This species is endemic to Australia and occurs off Queensland.
