= Scaphis astridae =

Scientific classification
- Kingdom: Animalia
- Phylum: Mollusca
- Class: Gastropoda
- Order: Systellommatophora
- Family: Onchidiidae
- Genus: Scaphis
- Species: S. astridae

Binomial name
- Scaphis astridae (Labbé, 1934)

Synonyms
- Onchidium astridae (Labbé, 1934); Oncidium astridae Labbé, 1934

Species of gastropod

Scaphis astridae is a species of air-breathing sea slug, a shell-less marine pulmonate gastropod mollusk in the family Onchidiidae.
