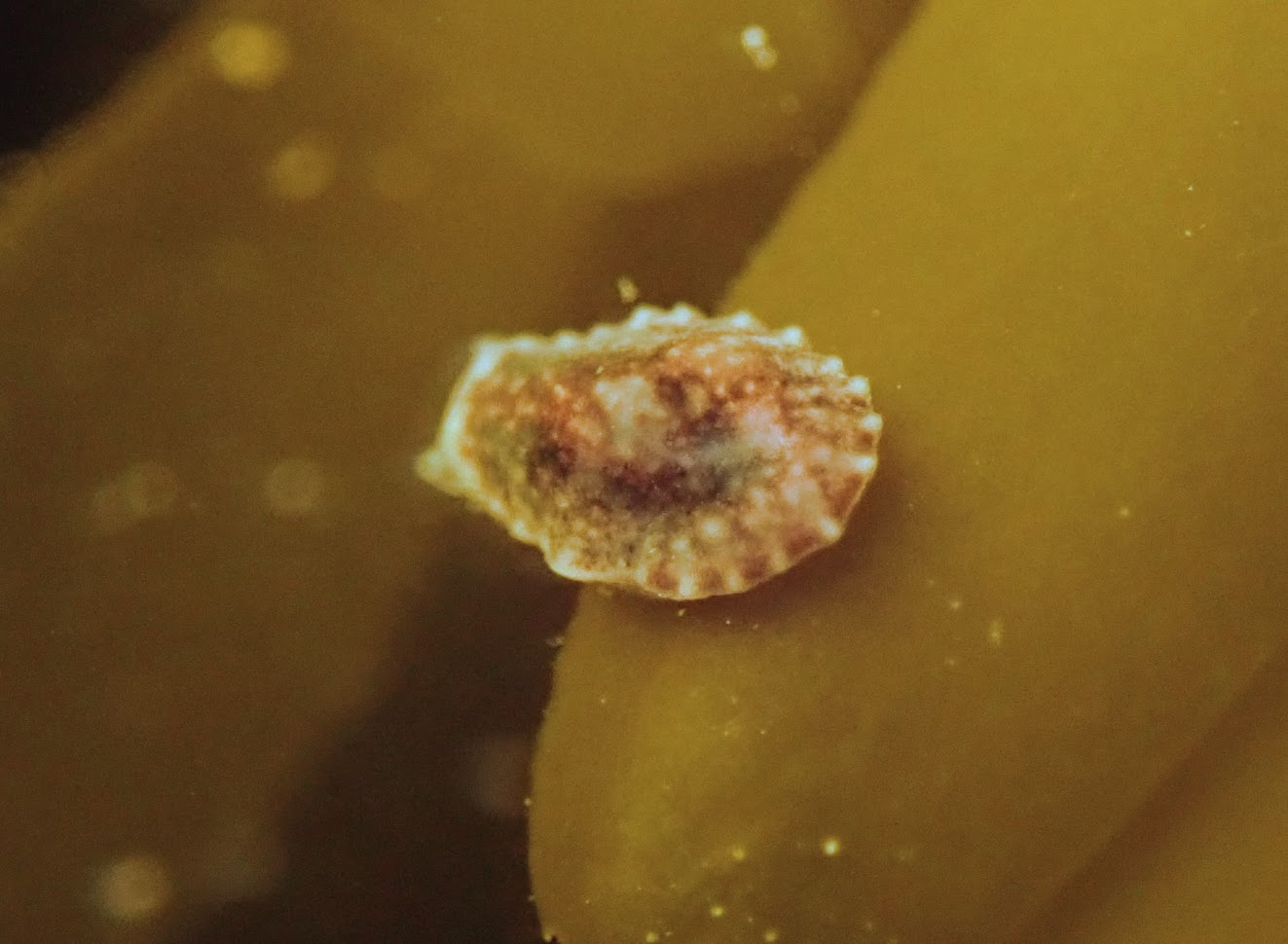

Scientific classification
- Kingdom: Animalia
- Phylum: Mollusca
- Class: Gastropoda
- Order: Systellommatophora
- Family: Onchidiidae
- Genus: Onchidella
- Species: O. carpenteri

Binomial name
- Onchidella carpenteri W.G. Binney, 1860

= Leather limpet =

Species of sea slug

Onchidella carpenteri, commonly known as the leather limpet, is a species of pulmonate sea slug, a marine gastropod mollusc in the order Systellommatophora and the family Onchidiidae. Members of the family Onchidiidae breathe air using a lung rather than gills, as they are more closely related to terrestrial slugs rather than the other marine gastropods also informally referred to as sea slugs (such as nudibranchs).

This species may also be referred to as Onchidella borealis (Dall, 1872), but this binomial is unaccepted by WoRMS.

== Distribution and habitat ==
Onchidella carpenteri occurs along the coast of the northeast Pacific Ocean, from Alaska to San Luis Obispo County, California. Like most other Onchidiids, the leather limpet is an intertidal species, typically dwelling in the mid- to high intertidal zone. Because they breathe air rather than underwater, they spend much of their time out of the water during low tide, often in sheltered areas like crevices, sea caves, and kelp holdfasts, which shelter them from the sun and help them to avoid drying out. This also means that they may be more easily observed on overcast days, when the sunlight is less intense. While underwater, they may rely on air bubbles for oxygen.

== Description ==
The leather limpet is small (up to 0.5 inches, or 13 mm, in length) and shaped somewhat like a teardrop with a blunted anterior end, where its short ocular tentacles (eyestalks) are.

Despite its common name, Onchidella carpenteri is not a limpet, nor are they closely related; rather, it is named for its resemblance to one. Closer inspection, and the "leather" in its common name, indicate that its limpet-like "shell" is actually not a shell at all, but rather a leathery dorsum. Like all members of the order Systellommatophora, Onchidella carpenteri lacks a shell or operculum in its adult form. Its dorsum varies in color, and may be reddish, purplish, or dark brown, olive, or yellow, or a combination of these colors; it is also often patterned with white mottling, which may radiate along the tips of the tubercles, resembling the shell patterns of many Lottia limpets. The small, blunt tubercles which line the dorsal margin can release secretions that repel potential predators, such as sea stars or crabs.

Its foot is light brown or cream in color. Like its land-dwelling relatives, Onchidella carpenteri has a pneumostome which opens to an internal lung; it is located on the posterior end, behind the anal opening.

== Ecology ==
=== Diet ===
Onchidella carpenteri is an algivore, feeding on both micro- (diatoms) and macro- algae, typically at low tide.

=== Reproduction ===
The leather limpet lays clusters of 6-40 encapsulated, gelatinous eggs, usually on kelp holdfasts. The larval stages occur while offspring are still in the egg; there is no planktonic, or free-floating stage, and juveniles crawl like adults immediately upon hatching.
