= O. maculata =

O. maculata may refer to:

- Oaracta maculata, a geometer moth
- Ocyropsis maculata, a comb jelly
- Odontocheilopteryx maculata, a snout moth
- Oeceoclades maculata, a monk orchid
- Oecia maculata, a long-horned moth
- Oedipoda maculata, a band-winged grasshopper
- Oligoria maculata, an American skipper
- Oliva maculata, a sea snail
- Onchidella maculata, a sea slug
- Ophryotrocha maculata, a ringed worm
- Orchis maculata, a perennial plant
- Orleanesia maculata, a plant native to South America
- Oxycera maculata, a soldier fly
- Oxychona maculata, a land snail
- Oxymeris maculata, an auger snail
