= Onchidella oniscioides =

Scientific classification
- Kingdom: Animalia
- Phylum: Mollusca
- Class: Gastropoda
- Order: Systellommatophora
- Family: Onchidiidae
- Genus: Onchidella
- Species: O. oniscioides

Binomial name
- Onchidella oniscioides (Blainville, 1816)

Synonyms
- Onchidium oniscioides Blainville, 1816

Species of gastropod

Onchidella oniscioides is a species of air-breathing sea slug, a shell-less marine pulmonate gastropod mollusk in the family Onchidiidae.
