= Onchidella philippei =

Scientific classification
- Kingdom: Animalia
- Phylum: Mollusca
- Class: Gastropoda
- Order: Systellommatophora
- Family: Onchidiidae
- Genus: Onchidella
- Species: O. philippei

Binomial name
- Onchidella philippei Ev. Marcus, 1979

Species of gastropod

Onchidella philippei is a species of air-breathing sea slug, a shell-less marine pulmonate gastropod mollusk in the family Onchidiidae.
