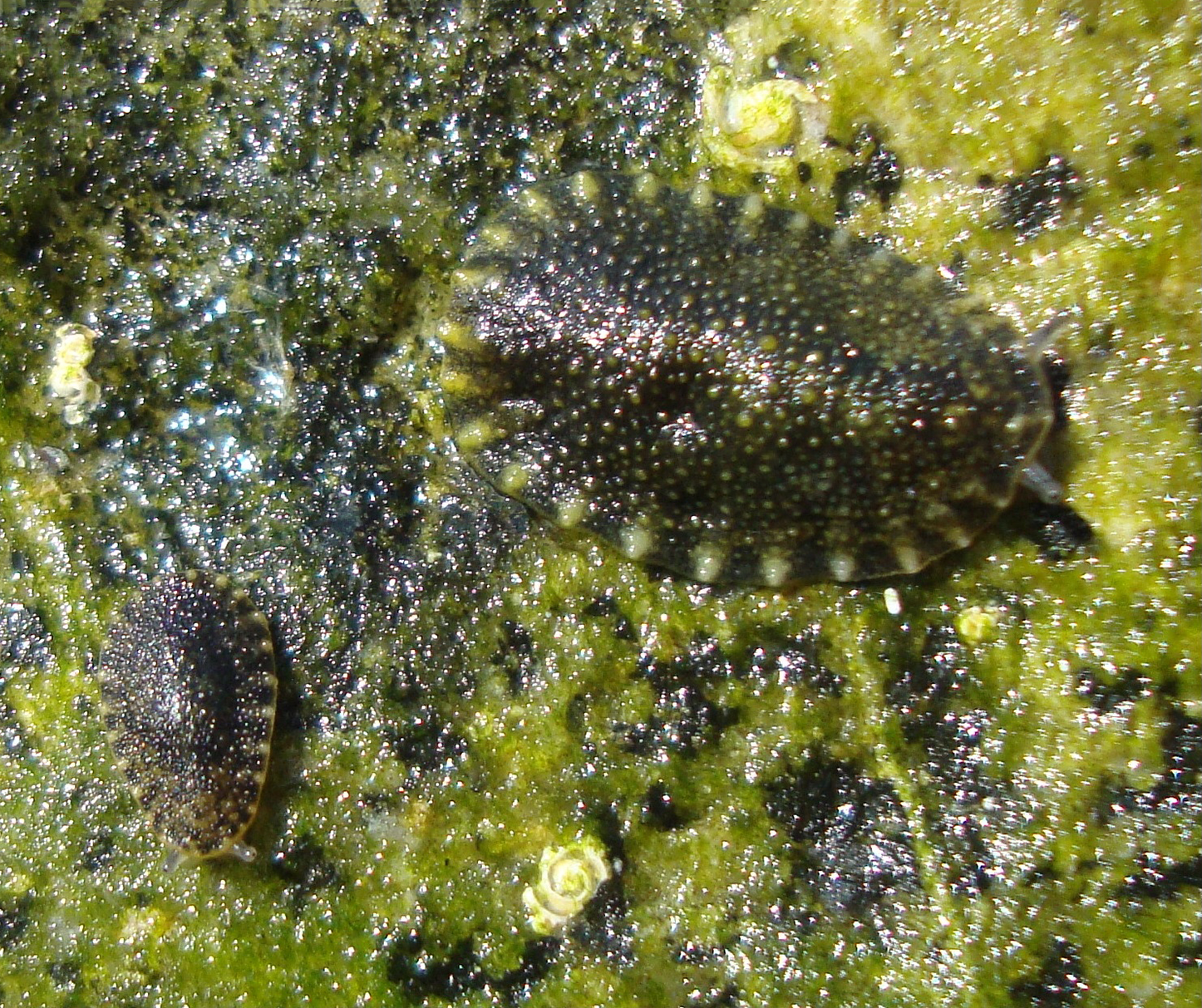

Scientific classification
- Kingdom: Animalia
- Phylum: Mollusca
- Class: Gastropoda
- Order: Systellommatophora
- Family: Onchidiidae
- Genus: Onchidella
- Species: O. marginata

Binomial name
- Onchidella marginata (Couthouy in Gould, 1852)

Synonyms
- Onchidella chilensis (Huppé in Gay, 1854); Onchidella juanfernandeziana (Wissel, 1898); Onchidium chilense Huppé in Gay, 1854; Onchidium lanuginosum Huppé in Gay, 1854; Oncidiella coquimbensis Plate, 1894; Oncidiella juanfernandeziana Wissel, 1898; Oncidiella juan-fernandeziana Wissel, 1898; Peronia marginata Couthouy in Gould, 1852

= Onchidella marginata =

Species of gastropod

Onchidella marginata is a species of air-breathing sea slug, a shell-less marine pulmonate gastropod mollusk in the family Onchidiidae.

== Description ==
O marginata undergoes direct-development.

== Distribution ==
O. marginata is found in southern Chile, the Falkland Islands, and New Zealand and its subantarctic islands.

== Ecology ==
O. marginata is associated with the southern bull kelp Durvillaea antarctica. When the holdfasts of the kelp detach from substrates they float and can raft over vast distances. Based on genetic data, the geographically distant populations of O. marginata are estimated to be closely related, and it has been suggested that the dispersal of the species far across the Southern Ocean has been facilitated by rafts of D. antarctica.
