= Onchidella miusha =

Scientific classification
- Kingdom: Animalia
- Phylum: Mollusca
- Class: Gastropoda
- Order: Systellommatophora
- Family: Onchidiidae
- Genus: Onchidella
- Species: O. miusha

Binomial name
- Onchidella miusha Ev. Marcus, 1978

Species of gastropod

Onchidella miusha is a species of air-breathing sea slug, a shell-less marine pulmonate gastropod mollusk in the family Onchidiidae.
