= Onchidium typhae =

Scientific classification
- Kingdom: Animalia
- Phylum: Mollusca
- Class: Gastropoda
- Order: Systellommatophora
- Family: Onchidiidae
- Genus: Onchidium
- Species: O. typhae

Binomial name
- Onchidium typhae Buchannan, 1800

Species of gastropod

Onchidium typhae is a species of air-breathing sea slug, a shell-less brackish water pulmonate gastropod mollusk in the family Onchidiidae.

== Distribution ==
Onchidium typhae is found from north-eastern India (West Bengal) to the Philippines, including Peninsular Malaysia, Singapore, Thailand, Vietnam, eastern Borneo, and China.

== Ecology ==
Onchidium typhae was formerly considered to live in fresh water; however, the Chao Phraya River that the species was collected from is under tidal influence year round, and the species is now recognized to be a brackish water species.
