= Onchidella indolens =

Scientific classification
- Kingdom: Animalia
- Phylum: Mollusca
- Class: Gastropoda
- Order: Systellommatophora
- Family: Onchidiidae
- Genus: Onchidella
- Species: O. indolens

Binomial name
- Onchidella indolens (Couthouy in Gould, 1852)

Synonyms
- Peronia indolens Couthouy in Gould, 1852

Species of gastropod

Onchidella indolens is a species of air-breathing sea slug, a shell-less marine pulmonate gastropod mollusk in the family Onchidiidae.
