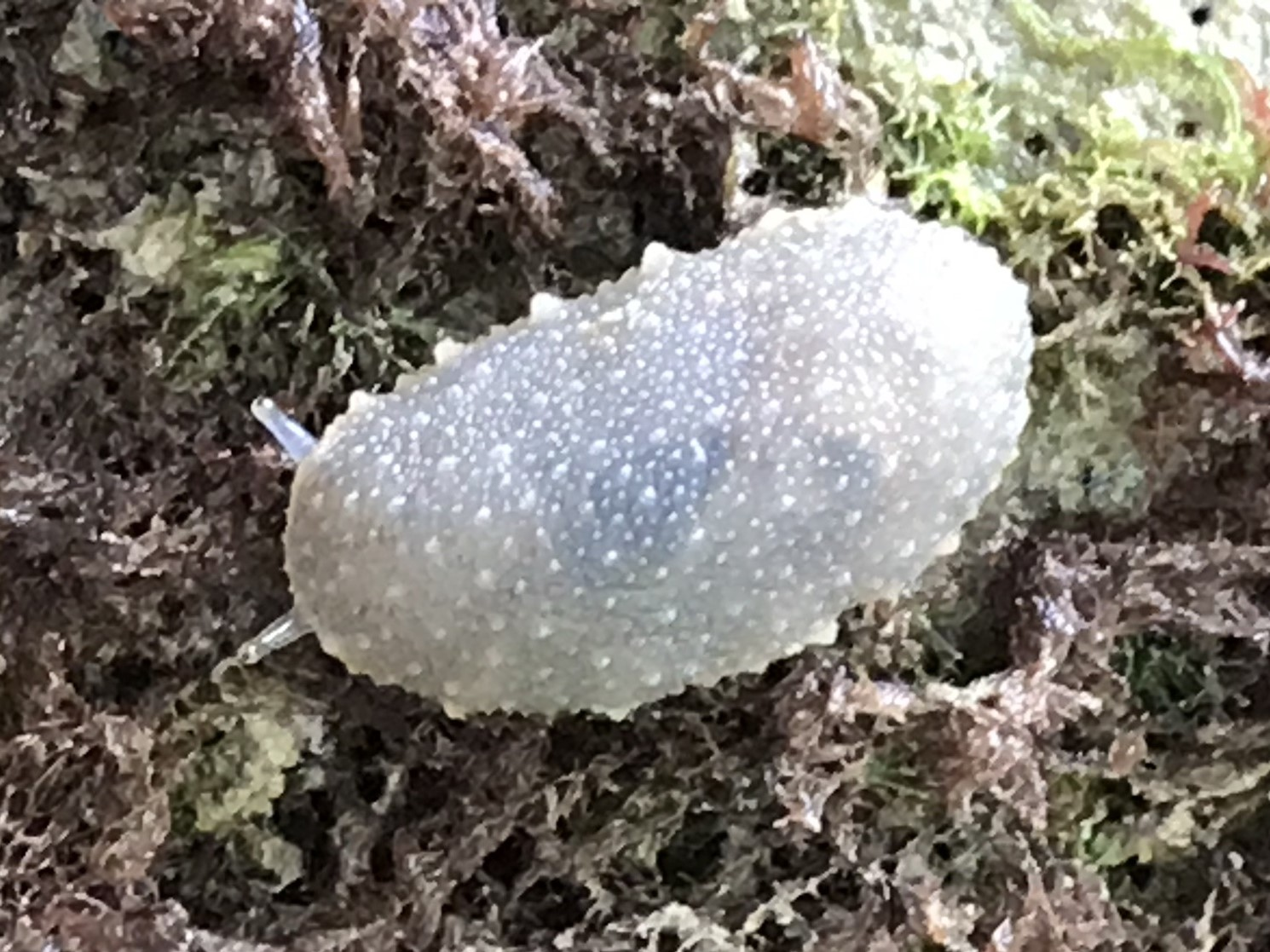

Scientific classification
- Kingdom: Animalia
- Phylum: Mollusca
- Class: Gastropoda
- Order: Systellommatophora
- Family: Onchidiidae
- Genus: Onchidella
- Species: O. floridana

Binomial name
- Onchidella floridana (Dall, 1885)

Synonyms
- Onchidium floridanum Dall, 1885; Onchidium transatlanticum Heilprin, 1889; Onchidium trans-atlanticum Heilprin, 1889

= Onchidella floridana =

Species of gastropod

Onchidella floridana is a species of air-breathing sea slug, a shell-less marine pulmonate gastropod mollusk in the family Onchidiidae.

== Distribution and habitat ==
This species occurs in the Caribbean Sea and the Gulf of Mexico. And was once ubiquitous in and around the shallow waters - intertidal zones - of Bermuda. Never located on the rugged, storm-tossed Atlantic Ocean side of the Island. Observed, studied & photographed by graduate student(s) attending Marine Ecology Summer Program at Bermuda Biological Station in 1985.
