= Onchidella monodi =

Scientific classification
- Kingdom: Animalia
- Phylum: Mollusca
- Class: Gastropoda
- Order: Systellommatophora
- Family: Onchidiidae
- Genus: Onchidella
- Species: O. monodi

Binomial name
- Onchidella monodi (Gabe, Prenant & Sourie, 1951)

Synonyms
- Oncidiella monodi Gabe, Prenant & Sourie, 1951

Species of gastropod

Onchidella monodi is a species of air-breathing sea slug, a shell-less marine pulmonate gastropod mollusk in the family Onchidiidae.
