= Platevindex tigrinus =

Scientific classification
- Kingdom: Animalia
- Phylum: Mollusca
- Class: Gastropoda
- Order: Systellommatophora
- Family: Onchidiidae
- Genus: Platevindex
- Species: P. tigrinus

Binomial name
- Platevindex tigrinus Stoliczka, 1869

Species of gastropod

Platevindex tigrinus is a species of air-breathing sea slug, a shell-less marine pulmonate gastropod mollusk in the family Onchidiidae.

== Description ==
This species has a light grey hyponotum like Platevindex coriaceus and can hardly be distinguished from that species, except by examining the internal anatomy or genome.

== Distribution ==
The species occurs in Brunei, India (Andaman Islands, Maharashtra and West Bengal), Peninsular Malaysia, Singapore, and Southern China.
