= Platevindex mortoni =

Scientific classification
- Kingdom: Animalia
- Phylum: Mollusca
- Class: Gastropoda
- Order: Systellommatophora
- Family: Onchidiidae
- Genus: Platevindex
- Species: P. mortoni

Binomial name
- Platevindex mortoni Britton, 1984

Synonyms
- Oncis mortoni (Britton, 1984)

Species of gastropod

Platevindex mortoni is a species of air-breathing sea slug, a shell-less marine pulmonate gastropod mollusc in the family Onchidiidae.

== Distribution ==
Platevindex mortoni is seen in shores of Hong Kong
