= Scaphis =

Scientific classification
- Kingdom: Animalia
- Phylum: Mollusca
- Class: Gastropoda
- Order: Systellommatophora
- Family: Onchidiidae
- Genus: Scaphis; Labbé, 1934

Genus of gastropods

Scaphis is a genus of air-breathing sea slugs, a shell-less marine pulmonate gastropod mollusks in the family Onchidiidae.

== Species ==
According to the World Register of Marine Species (WoRMS), the following species with valid names are included within the genus Scaphis :

- Scaphis astridae (Labbé, 1934)
- Scaphis atra (Lesson, 1830)
- Scaphis carbonaria Labbé, 1934
- Scaphis gravieri Labbé, 1934
- Scaphis lata Labbé, 1934
- Scaphis punctata (Quoy & Gaimard, 1832)
- Scaphis straelenii (Labbé, 1934)
- Scaphis tonkinensis Labbé, 1934
- Scaphis viridis Labbé, 1934
