= Platevindex applanatus =

Scientific classification
- Kingdom: Animalia
- Phylum: Mollusca
- Class: Gastropoda
- Order: Systellommatophora
- Family: Onchidiidae
- Genus: Platevindex
- Species: P. applanatum

Binomial name
- Platevindex applanatum (Simroth, 1920)

Synonyms
- Oncidium applanatum Simroth, 1920; Onchidium applanatum Simroth, 1920

Species of gastropod

Platevindex applanatus is a species of air-breathing sea slug, a shell-less marine pulmonate gastropod mollusk in the family Onchidiidae.
