= Wallaconchis nangkauriensis =

Scientific classification
- Kingdom: Animalia
- Phylum: Mollusca
- Class: Gastropoda
- Order: Systellommatophora
- Family: Onchidiidae
- Genus: Wallaconchis
- Species: W. nangkauriense

Binomial name
- Wallaconchis nangkauriense (Plate, 1893)

Synonyms
- Oncidium nangkauriense Plate, 1893; Paraoncidium nangkauriense (Plate, 1893); Wallaconchis nangkauriense (Plate, 1893)

Species of gastropod

Wallaconchis nangkauriensis is a species of air-breathing sea slug, a shell-less marine pulmonate gastropod mollusk in the family Onchidiidae.
