= Hoffmannola =

Scientific classification
- Kingdom: Animalia
- Phylum: Mollusca
- Class: Gastropoda
- Order: Systellommatophora
- Family: Onchidiidae
- Genus: Hoffmannola; Strand, 1932

Genus of gastropods

Hoffmannola is a genus of air-breathing sea slugs, a shell-less marine pulmonate gastropod mollusk in the family Onchidiidae.

== Species ==
Species within the genus Hoffmannola include:

- Hoffmannola hansi Ev. Marcus & Er. Marcus, 1967
- Hoffmannola lesliei (Stearns, 1892)
