= Peronina tenera =

Scientific classification
- Kingdom: Animalia
- Phylum: Mollusca
- Class: Gastropoda
- Order: Systellommatophora
- Family: Onchidiidae
- Genus: Peronina
- Species: P. tenera

Binomial name
- Peronina tenera (Stoliczka, 1869)

Synonyms
- Onchidium tenerum Stoliczka, 1869; Peronina alta Plate, 1893

Species of gastropod

Peronina tenera is a species of air-breathing sea slug, a shell-less marine pulmonate gastropod mollusk in the family Onchidiidae.
