= Onchidium reevesii =

Scientific classification
- Kingdom: Animalia
- Phylum: Mollusca
- Class: Gastropoda
- Order: Systellommatophora
- Family: Onchidiidae
- Genus: Onchidium
- Species: O. reevesii

Binomial name
- Onchidium reevesii (J. E. Gray, 1850)

Synonyms
- Onchidella reevesii J. E. Gray, 1850; Onchidium struma (nomen nudum); Paraoncidium reevesii (Gray, 1850)

Species of gastropod

Onchidium reevesii is a species of air-breathing sea slug, a shell-less marine pulmonate gastropod mollusk in the family Onchidiidae. It is one of four recognized species in the genus Onchidium.

== Distribution ==
Onchidium reevesii is known only from the coast of China and Hong Kong.

== Description ==
The Onchidium reevesii can be found living in the intertidal zone near mangroves in the subtropical waters of China.
