= C17H24O3 =

The molecular formula C_{17}H_{24}O_{3} may refer to:

- Cyclandelate, a vasodilator
- Onchidal, a naturally occurring neurotoxin
- Shogaols, pungent constituents of ginger
