= S. carbonaria =

S. carbonaria may refer to:

- Scaphis carbonaria, an air-breathing sea slug species
- Schistura carbonaria, a ray-finned fish species

== See also ==
- Carbonaria (disambiguation)
