= Onchidella maculata =

Scientific classification
- Kingdom: Animalia
- Phylum: Mollusca
- Class: Gastropoda
- Order: Systellommatophora
- Family: Onchidiidae
- Genus: Onchidella
- Species: O. maculata

Binomial name
- Onchidella maculata (Plate, 1893)

Synonyms
- Oncidiella maculata Plate, 1893; Onchidella capensis H. M. Watson, 1925; Onchidella capensis var. paucidenta Watson, 1925; Onchidella pulchella Watson, 1925

Species of gastropod

Onchidella maculata is a species of air-breathing sea slug, a shell-less marine pulmonate gastropod mollusk in the family Onchidiidae.

== Description ==
A small (10mm) mottled brown hemispherical slug. Skin thick and warty, head with a pair of short brown tentacles.

== Distribution ==
Orange River mouth to Cape Agulhas.
