= S. tonkinensis =

S. tonkinensis may refer to:

- Scaphis tonkinensis, an air-breathing sea slug species
- Sindora tonkinensis, a legume species found in Cambodia and Vietnam
- Sinogastromyzon tonkinensis, a ray-finned fish species
- Sophora tonkinensis, a plant species used in traditional Chinese medicine.
- Strobilanthes tonkinensis, a species of herbaceous plant used as a flavoring for tea native to Southeast Asia
