= Onchidium granulosum =

Scientific classification
- Kingdom: Animalia
- Phylum: Mollusca
- Class: Gastropoda
- Order: Systellommatophora
- Family: Onchidiidae
- Genus: Onchidium
- Species: O. granulosum

Binomial name
- Onchidium granulosum Lesson, 1831

Synonyms
- Oncis granulosa (R. P. Lesson, 1831); Platevindex granulosus (R. P. Lesson, 1831)

Species of gastropod

Onchidium granulosum is a species of air-breathing sea slug, a shell-less marine pulmonate gastropod mollusc in the family Onchidiidae.
