= Onchidella orientalis =

Scientific classification
- Kingdom: Animalia
- Phylum: Mollusca
- Class: Gastropoda
- Order: Systellommatophora
- Family: Onchidiidae
- Genus: Onchidella
- Species: O. orientalis

Binomial name
- Onchidella orientalis (Taki, 1935)

Synonyms
- Oncidiella orientalis Taki, 1935

Species of gastropod

Onchidella orientalis is a species of air-breathing sea slug. It is a shell-less marine pulmonate gastropod mollusk in the family Onchidiidae.
