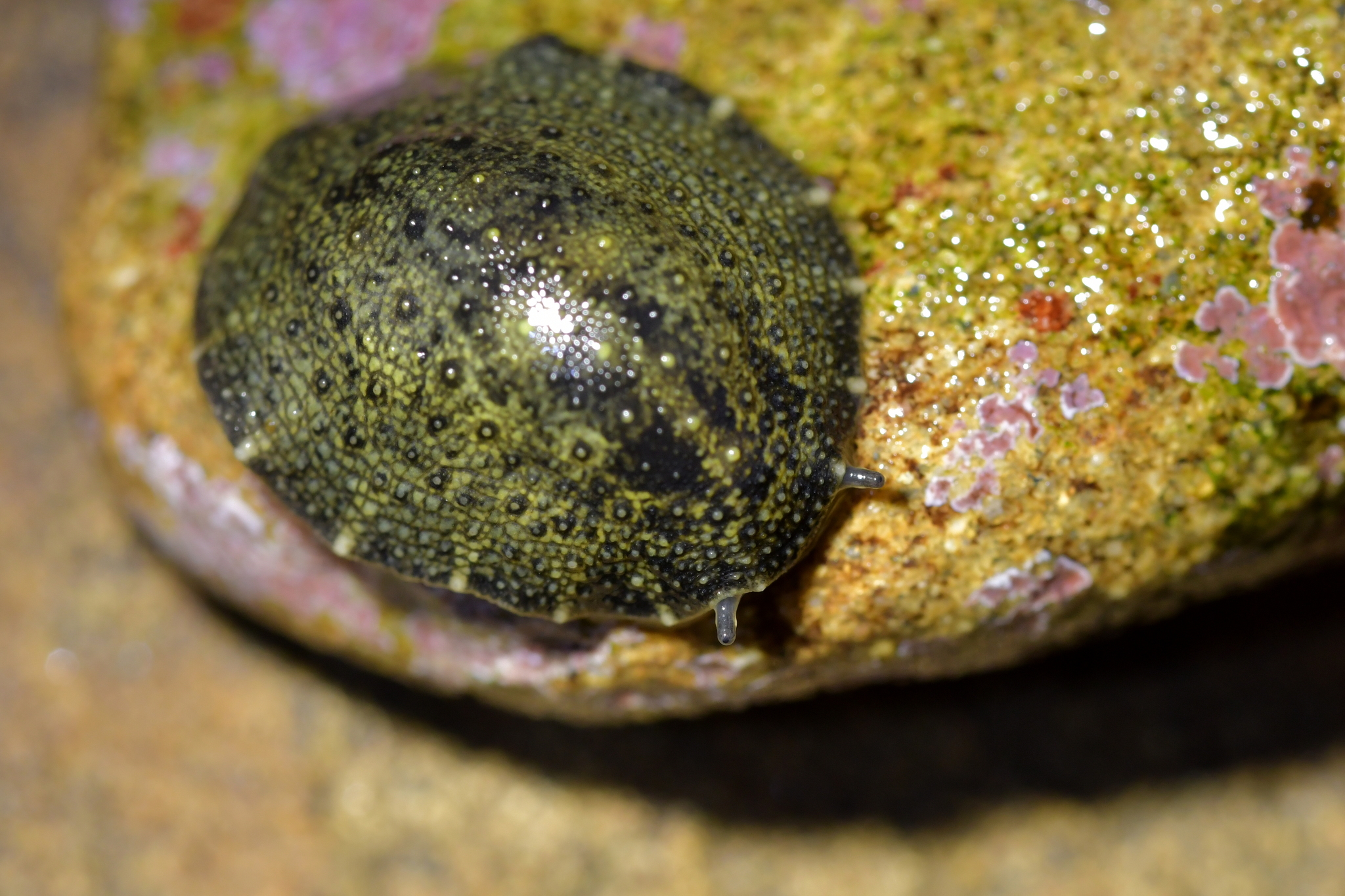
- Dorsal view of Onchidella nigricans

Scientific classification
- Kingdom: Animalia
- Phylum: Mollusca
- Class: Gastropoda
- Order: Systellommatophora
- Family: Onchidiidae
- Genus: Onchidella
- Species: O. nigricans

Binomial name
- Onchidella nigricans (Quoy & Gaimard, 1832)

Synonyms
- Onchidella irrorata (Gould, 1852); Onchidella obscura (Plate, 1893); Onchidella patelloida (Quoy & Gaimard, 1832); Onchidium nigricans Quoy & Gaimard, 1832; Onchidium patelloide Quoy & Gaimard, 1832; Oncidiella obscura Plate, 1893; Peronia irrorata Gould, 1852

= Onchidella nigricans =

Species of gastropod

Onchidella nigricans is a species of small, air-breathing sea slug, a shell-less marine pulmonate gastropod mollusc in the family Onchidiidae.

== Distribution ==
This species occurs in New Zealand, as well as on the coast of south-eastern Australia, where it is common.

== Feeding ==
O. nigricans is a general herbivore feeding on algae. It also consumes zooplankton.

== Habitat ==
This species can be found in the intertidal zone on a variety of habitats.
