= Peronina =

Scientific classification
- Kingdom: Animalia
- Phylum: Mollusca
- Class: Gastropoda
- Order: Systellommatophora
- Family: Onchidiidae
- Genus: Peronina; Plate, 1893

Genus of gastropods

Peronina is a genus of air-breathing sea slugs, a shell-less marine pulmonate gastropod mollusks in the family Onchidiidae.

== Species ==
Two species are accepted within the genus Peronina:

- Peronina tenera (Stoliczka, 1869)
- Peronina zulfigari Goulding & Dayrat, 2018
