= Melayonchis =

Scientific classification
- Kingdom: Animalia
- Phylum: Mollusca
- Class: Gastropoda
- Order: Systellommatophora
- Family: Onchidiidae
- Subfamily: Onchidiinae
- Genus: Melayonchis; Dayrat & Goulding, 2017

Type species
- Melayonchis eloisae Dayrat, 2017

Genus of air-breathing marine slugs

Melayonchis is a genus of air-breathing, shell-less marine gastropods in the family Onchidiidae.Members of the genus are mangrove-associated slugs found in the intertidal zone of coastal Southeast Asia, where they live on tree trunks, stilt roots, dead logs, and other hard surfaces rather than on open mudflats. The genus was first described in 2017 and currently contains six recognised species.

== Description ==
Members of Melayonchis are medium-sized onchidiid slugs with an elongated body and a dorsal notum covered in conical papillae, some of which bear dorsal eyes. Like other onchidiids, they lack an external shell and breathe air using a lung rather than gills.

The genus can be distinguished from other onchidiids by internal anatomical characters, especially a distinctive protuberance on the inner lateral margin of the lateral teeth in the radula, a feature reported as unique within the family in the original description. Species of Melayonchis also lack dorsal gills and marginal glands.

Species within the genus show varied defensive behaviour. For example, Melayonchis eloisae has been observed rolling into a tight ball when disturbed, while Melayonchis siongkiati secretes abundant oily mucus from the dorsal notum. These behavioural traits have been noted as useful for field identification.

== Etymology ==
The generic name Melayonchis is derived from Melayu, the Malay word for "Malay", combined with Onchis, a historical name element used in onchidiid taxonomy. The name refers to the Malay-region core of the genus's known distribution, particularly Peninsular Malaysia, Singapore, and coastal Borneo.

== Taxonomy ==
Melayonchis was first described in 2017 during a systematic revision of the family Onchidiidae. The genus was erected for a distinct clade of onchidiid slugs for which no previously available generic name was considered applicable. The type species is Melayonchis eloisae.

The genus was originally described with four species from Southeast Asia. Two additional species were described in 2019, bringing the total number of recognised species to six.

=== Species ===
Melayonchis contains the following species:

- Melayonchis aileenae Dayrat & Goulding, 2017
- Melayonchis annae Dayrat, 2017
- Melayonchis eberlyi Dayrat & Goulding, 2019
- Melayonchis eloisae Dayrat, 2017
- Melayonchis siongkiati Dayrat & Goulding, 2017
- Melayonchis tillieri Dayrat, 2019

== Distribution and habitat ==
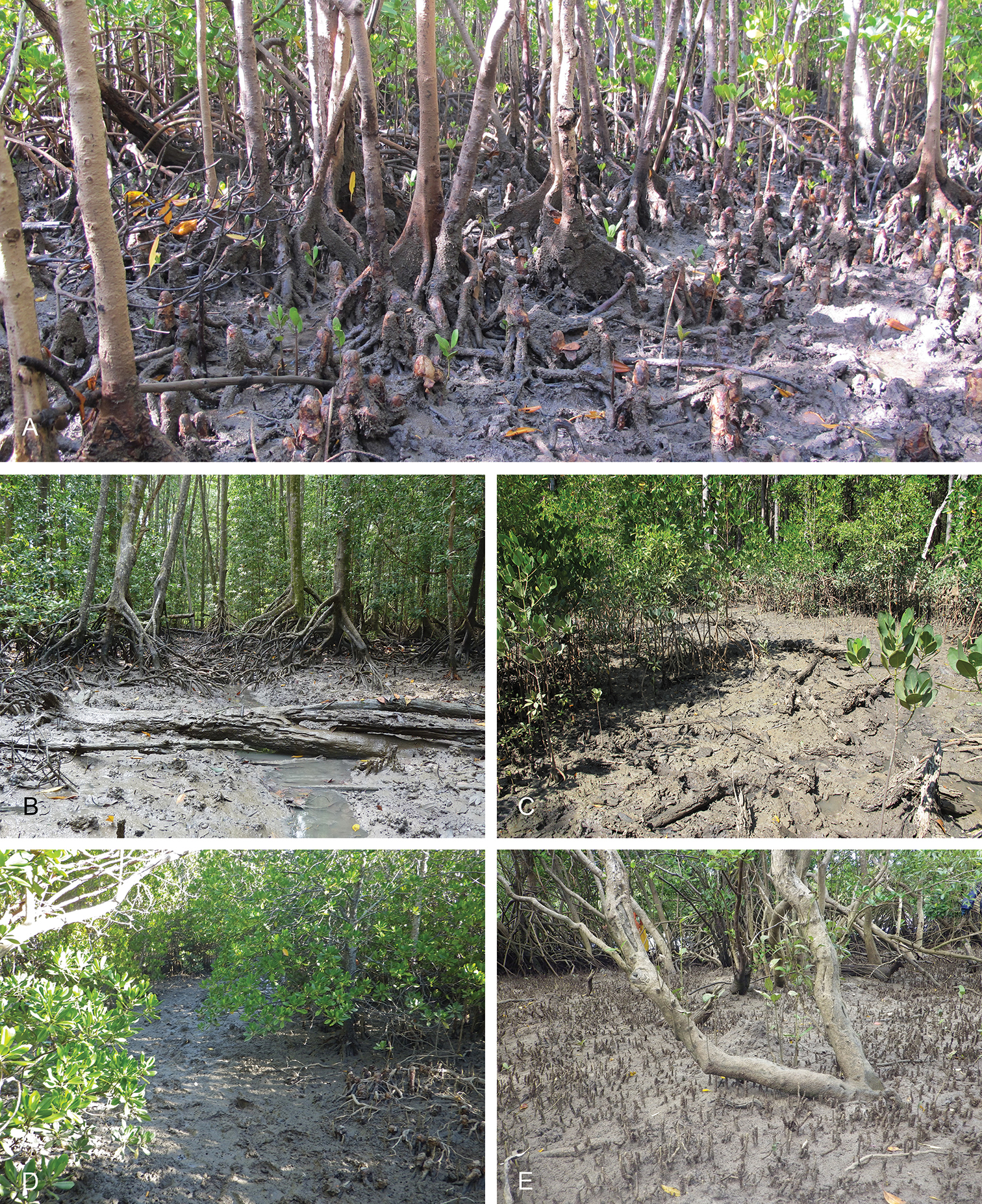
Mangrove forest habitats typical of Melayonchis species in Southeast Asia

Melayonchis is distributed from the Andaman Islands and the Andaman Sea eastward through the Strait of Malacca to the South China Sea. The original description recorded species from the Andaman Islands, Peninsular Malaysia, Singapore, Brunei, and Vietnam. Subsequent records expanded the known range to eastern Sumatra and the Northern Territory of Australia.

Species of Melayonchis are strictly associated with mangrove habitats in the upper intertidal zone. They are typically found on the stilt roots and bark of Rhizophora trees, on decaying logs, and occasionally on artificial hard surfaces such as concrete drainage channels near the high-tide line. They are generally absent from exposed mudflats.

== Ecology ==
Like other members of the Onchidiidae, Melayonchis species are marine slugs that breathe air and are active when exposed during low tide. Their larvae develop in the sea, but adults are associated with emergent mangrove substrates and cannot remain submerged for prolonged periods.

The dorsal surface is often coated with a thin layer of muddy mucus, which may provide camouflage against bark and woody mangrove substrates. This cryptic covering, together with their preference for mangrove roots and logs, makes living individuals difficult to detect in the field.
