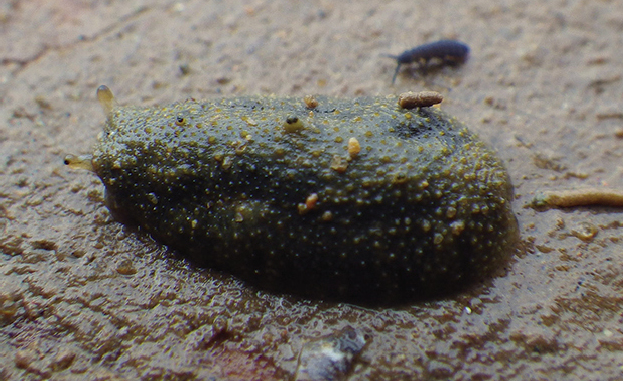
- Wallaconchis sinanui

Scientific classification
- Kingdom: Animalia
- Phylum: Mollusca
- Class: Gastropoda
- Order: Systellommatophora
- Superfamily: Onchidioidea
- Family: Onchidiidae
- Genus: Wallaconchis; Goulding & Dayrat, 2018

Type species
- Wallaconchis sinanui Goulding & Dayrat, 2018

= Wallaconchis =

Genus of gastropods

Wallaconchis is a genus of air-breathing sea slugs, a shell-less marine pulmonate gastropod mollusks in the family Onchidiidae.

They live in the intertidal zone near mangrove trees on coral rubble, sand, sandy mud, or rocks.

== Species ==
According to the World Register of Marine Species (WoRMS), the following species are part of the genus Wallaconchis:

- Wallaconchis achleitneri Goulding, 2018
- Wallaconchis ater (Lesson, 1831)
- Wallaconchis buetschlii (Stantschinsky, 1907)
- Wallaconchis comendadori Goulding & Dayrat, 2018
- Wallaconchis gracilis (Stantschinsky, 1907)
- Wallaconchis graniferus (Semper, 1880)
- Wallaconchisx melanesiensis Goulding & Dayrat, 2018
- Wallaconchis nangkauriensis (Plate, 1893)
- Wallaconchis sinanui Goulding & Dayrat, 2018
- Wallaconchis uncinus Goulding & Dayrat, 2018

Nomen dubium

- Wallaconchis fungiformis (Stantschinsky, 1907)
- Wallaconchis ovalis (C. Semper, 1880)
- Wallaconchis simrothi (Plate, 1893)

Species brought into synonymy

- Wallaconchis atra (Lesson, 1831): synonym of Wallaconchis ater (Lesson, 1831)
- Wallaconchis fungiforme (Stantschinsky, 1907): synonym of Wallaconchis fungiformis (Stantschinsky, 1907) (wrong gender agreement of specific epithet)
- Wallaconchis gracile (Stantschinsky, 1907): synonym of Wallaconchis gracilis (Stantschinsky, 1907) (wrong gender agreement of specific epithet)
- Wallaconchis graniferum (C. Semper, 1880): synonym of Wallaconchis graniferus (C. Semper, 1880) (wrong gender agreement of specific epithet)
- Wallaconchis nangkauriense (Plate, 1893): synonym of Wallaconchis nangkauriensis (Plate, 1893) (wrong gender agreement of specific epithet)
