= Onchidella carpenteri =

Scientific classification
- Kingdom: Animalia
- Phylum: Mollusca
- Class: Gastropoda
- Order: Systellommatophora
- Family: Onchidiidae
- Genus: Onchidella
- Species: O. carpenteri

Binomial name
- Onchidella carpenteri (Binney, 1861)

Synonyms
- Onchidella binneyi Stearns, 1894; Onchidium carpenteri Binney, 1861

Species of gastropod

Onchidella carpenteri is a species of air-breathing sea slug, a shell-less marine pulmonate gastropod mollusk in the family Onchidiidae.

It is considered by WoRMS a nomen dubium.
