= Marmaronchis =

Scientific classification
- Kingdom: Animalia
- Phylum: Mollusca
- Class: Gastropoda
- Order: Systellommatophora
- Superfamily: Onchidioidea
- Family: Onchidiidae
- Genus: Marmaronchis; Dayrat & Goulding, 2018

Type species
- Onchidium vaigiense Quoy & Gaimard, 1825

Genus of gastropods

Marmaronchis is a genus of air-breathing sea slugs, a shell-less marine pulmonate gastropod mollusks in the family Onchidiidae.

== Species ==
Species within the genus Marmaronchis include:

- Marmaronchis marmoratus (Lesson, 1831)
- Marmaronchis vaigiensis (Quoy & Gaimard, 1825)
