= O. orientalis =

O. orientalis may refer to:

- Octoknema orientalis, a plant species endemic to Tanzania
- Onchidella orientalis, an air-breathing sea slug species
- Orosius orientalis, the common brown leafhopper, a leafhopper species found in Australia
- Ovis orientalis (or O. aries orientalis), the mouflon, a wild sheep species
- Oxychilus orientalis, an air-breathing land snail species found in Slovakia

== See also ==
- Orientalis (disambiguation)
