= Semperoncis =

Scientific classification
- Kingdom: Animalia
- Phylum: Mollusca
- Class: Gastropoda
- Order: Systellommatophora
- Family: Onchidiidae
- Genus: Semperoncis (Labbé, 1934)

Synonyms
- Semperella Labbé, 1934

Genus of gastropods

Semperoncis is a genus of air-breathing sea slugs, a shell-less marine pulmonate gastropod mollusks in the family Onchidiidae.

== Species ==
According to the World Register of Marine Species (WoRMS), the following species with a valid name are included within the genus Semperoncis:

- Semperoncis glabra (Semper, 1885)
- Semperoncis huberti (Labbé, 1934) (nomen dubium)
- Semperoncis montana (Plate, 1893)
