= Alionchis =

Scientific classification
- Kingdom: Animalia
- Phylum: Mollusca
- Class: Gastropoda
- Order: Systellommatophora
- Family: Onchidiidae
- Genus: Alionchis; Goulding and Dayrat, 2018

Genus of sea slugs

Alionchis is a genus of air-breathing sea slugs, a shell-less marine pulmonate gastropod mollusks in the family Onchidiidae.

Alionchis have large eye tentacles and a bright white margin on the ventral surface of the mantle which makes them highly distinct from other onchidiids.

== Species ==
Species within the genus Alionchis include:

- Alionchis jailoloensis
