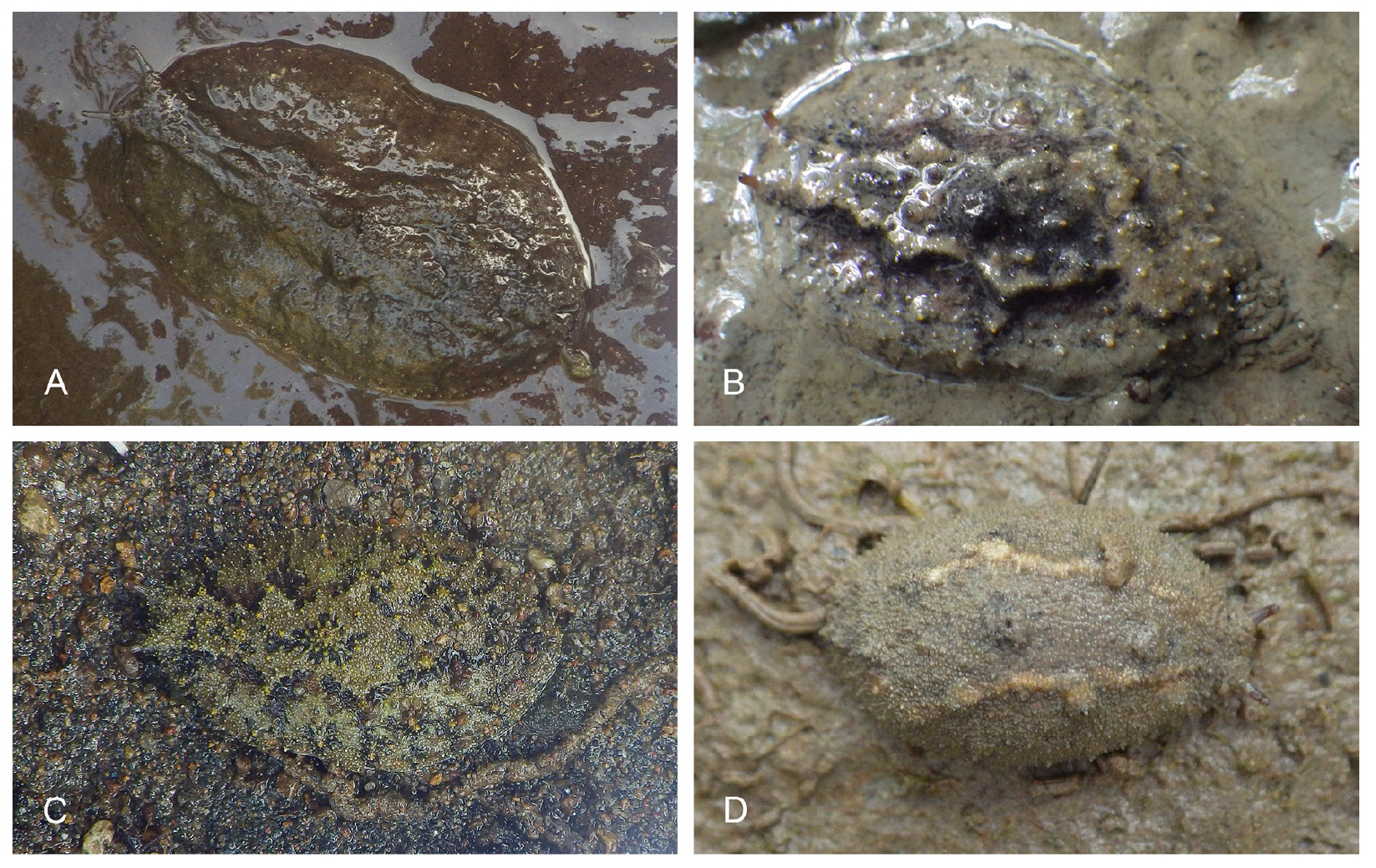
- Paromoionchis tumidus

Scientific classification
- Kingdom: Animalia
- Phylum: Mollusca
- Class: Gastropoda
- Order: Systellommatophora
- Family: Onchidiidae
- Genus: Paromoionchis; Dayrat & Goulding, 2019

= Paromoionchis =

Genus of gastropods

Paromoionchis is a genus of air-breathing sea slugs, shell-less marine pulmonate gastropod molluscs in the family Onchidiidae. Most Paromoionchis species live on the mud in mangrove forests in the Indo-West Pacific.

== Species ==
. There are five species currently recognized in the genus:

- Paromoionchis boholensis Dayrat & Goulding, 2019
- Paromoionchis daemelii (Semper, 1880)
- Paromoionchis goslineri Dayrat & Goulding, 2019
- Paromoionchis penangensis Dayrat & Goulding, 2019
- Paromoionchis tumidus (Semper, 1880)
