= Semper's organ =

The Semper's organ is an anatomical structure, a gland located in the head of some land snails, pulmonate gastropod mollusks.

This organ was named after the German zoologist Carl Gottfried Semper, who first published information about this anatomical structure in 1856.
