= Onchidal =

Chemical compound

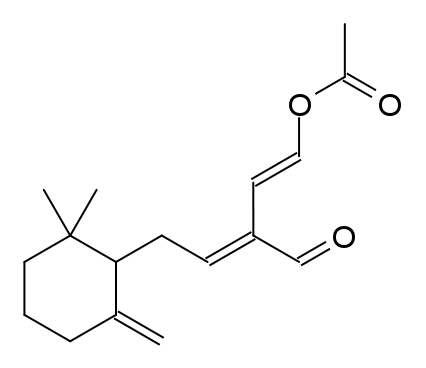

Clinical data
- ATC code: none

Identifiers
- IUPAC name: (1E,3E)-5-(2,2-Dimethyl-6-methylenecyclohexyl)-3-formylpenta-1,3-dien-1-yl acetate
- CAS Number: 67656-42-2
- PubChem CID: 6441116
- ChemSpider: 4945331
- UNII: UZ2G6C54PR
- CompTox Dashboard (EPA): DTXSID90897204

Chemical and physical data
- Formula: C_{17}H_{24}O_{3}
- Molar mass: 276.376 g·mol^{−1}
- 3D model (JSmol): Interactive image
- SMILES: CC(=O)O\C=C\C(=C/CC1C(=C)CCCC1(C)C)\C=O
- InChI: InChI=1S/C17H24O3/c1-13-6-5-10-17(3,4)16(13)8-7-15(12-18)9-11-20-14(2)19/h7,9,11-12,16H,1,5-6,8,10H2,2-4H3/b11-9+,15-7+; Key:BEKQPDFPPJFVJP-AHSQCEKMSA-N

Onchidal is a naturally occurring neurotoxin produced as a defensive secretion by the mollusc Onchidella binneyi and several other related species in Onchidella, a genus of small, air-breathing sea slugs. It acts as an irreversible acetylcholinesterase inhibitor, the same mechanism of action as that of the deadly nerve agents, however onchidal is not an organophosphorus or carbamate compound and bears little resemblance to other compounds of this nature.
