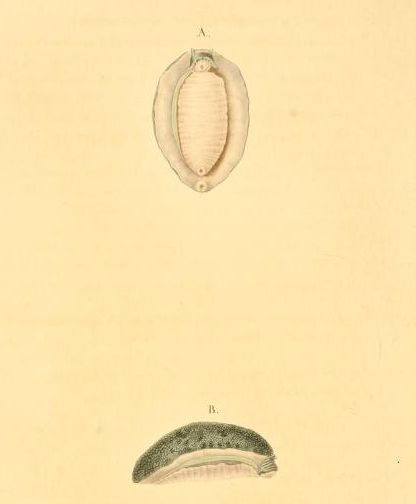

Scientific classification
- Kingdom: Animalia
- Phylum: Mollusca
- Class: Gastropoda
- Order: Systellommatophora
- Family: Onchidiidae
- Genus: Wallaconchis
- Species: W. ater

Binomial name
- Wallaconchis ater (R. P. Lesson, 1831)

Synonyms
- Lessonina ferruginea (R. P. Lesson, 1831); Onchidella nigra J. E. Gray, 1850; Onchidium ater R. P. Lesson, 1831; Oncidium keiense H. Hoffmann, 1926; Paraoncidium keiense (H. Hoffmann, 1926); Scaphis atra (R. P. Lesson, 1831); Wallaconchis atra (R. P. Lesson, 1831)

= Wallaconchis ater =

Species of gastropod

Wallaconchis ater is a species of air-breathing sea slug, a shell-less marine pulmonate gastropod mollusc in the family Onchidiidae.

== Distribution ==
This species has been found in the Philippines and Indonesia.
