= Onchidium stuxbergi =

Scientific classification
- Kingdom: Animalia
- Phylum: Mollusca
- Class: Gastropoda
- Order: Systellommatophora
- Family: Onchidiidae
- Genus: Onchidium
- Species: O. stuxbergi

Binomial name
- Onchidium stuxbergi (Westerlund, 1883)

Synonyms
- Elophilus ajuthiae Labbé, 1935; Labbella ajuthiae (Labbé, 1935); Onchidium nigrum Plate, 1893; Onchidium pallidipes (Tapparone Canefri, 1889); Oncidium nigrum Plate, 1893; Oncidium pallidipes Tapparone Canefri, 1889; Oncis stuxbergi (Westerlund, 1883); Platevindex stuxbergi (Westerlund, 1883); Vaginulus stuxbergi Westerlund, 1883

Species of gastropod

Onchidium stuxbergi is a species of air-breathing sea slug, a shell-less brackish water pulmonate gastropod mollusc in the family Onchidiidae.

== Distribution ==
From north-eastern India (West Bengal) to the Philippines, including Peninsular Malaysia, Singapore, Thailand, Vietnam, eastern Borneo, and China.

== Description ==
Slug has long eye tentacles and fully retractable, central papilla with three dorsal eyes. The foot is bright orange.
