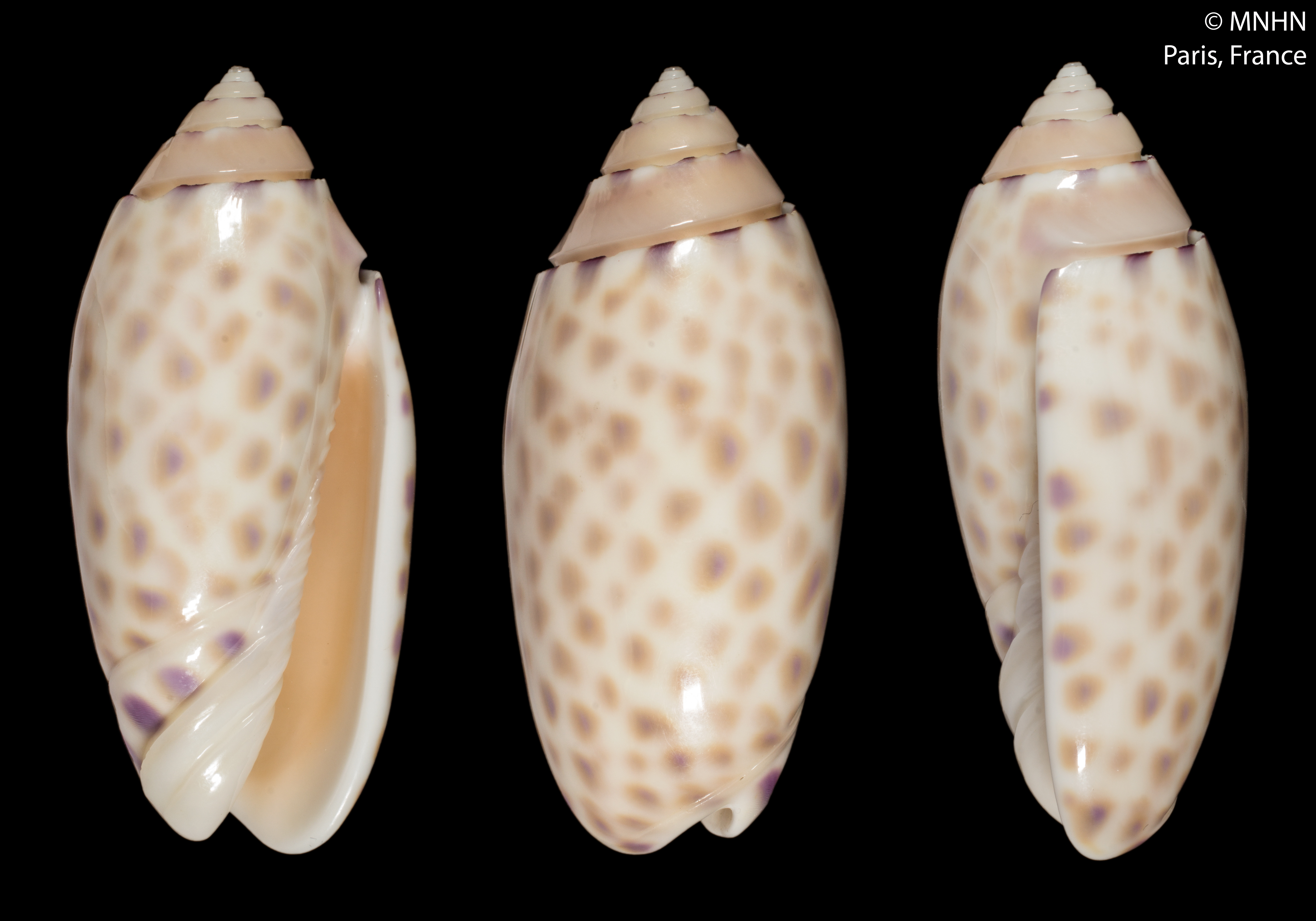

Scientific classification
- Kingdom: Animalia
- Phylum: Mollusca
- Class: Gastropoda
- Subclass: Caenogastropoda
- Order: Neogastropoda
- Family: Olividae
- Genus: Oliva
- Species: O. maculata

Binomial name
- Oliva maculata Duclos, 1840

Synonyms
- Annulatoliva maculata (Duclos, 1840)

= Oliva maculata =

Species of gastropod

Oliva maculata is a species of sea snail, a marine gastropod mollusk in the family Olividae, the olives.

== Distribution ==
This marine species occurs off Zanzibar, the Philippines and in Oceania and Polynesia.
