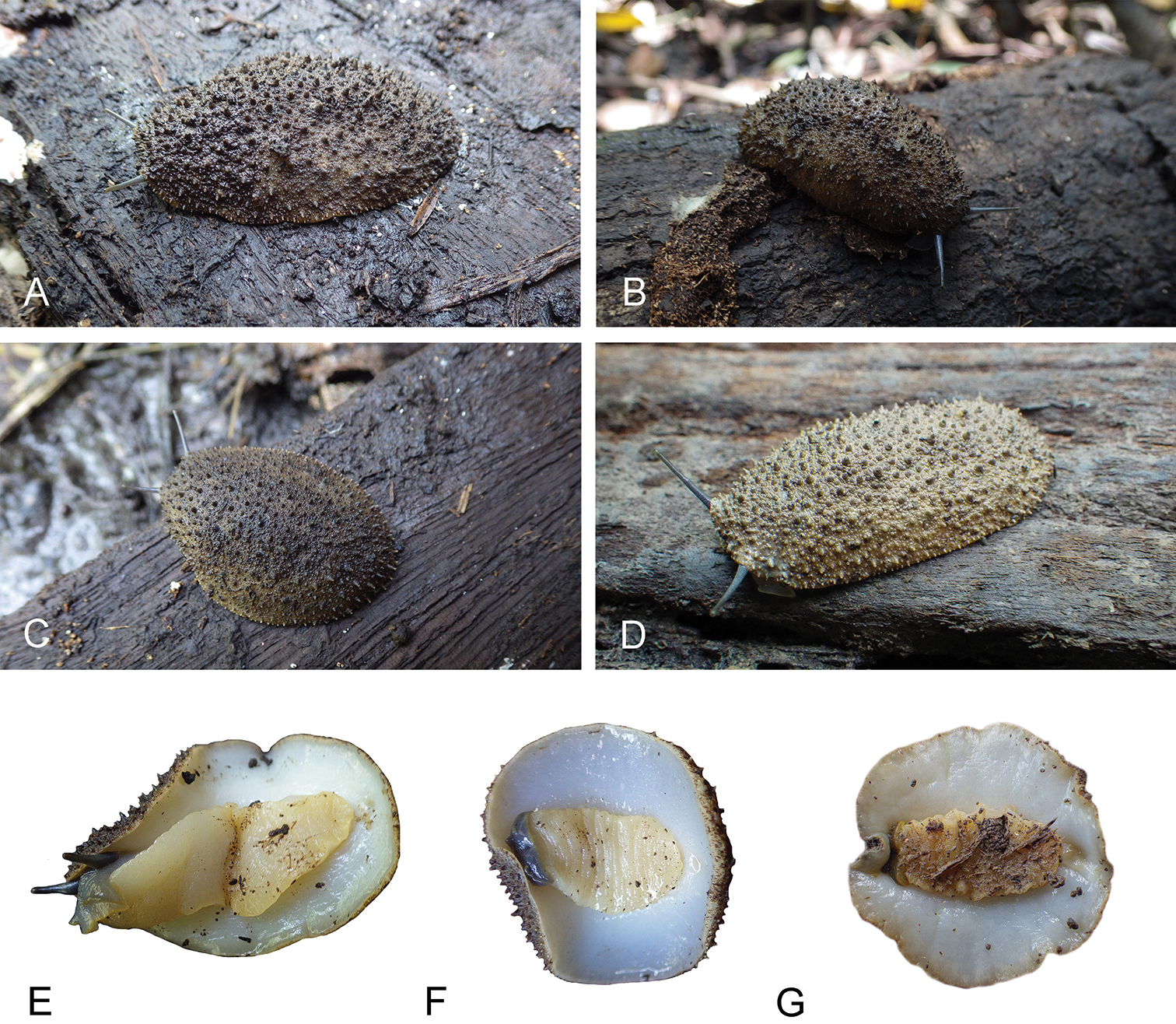
- Live animals and holotype of Onchidium melakense from Peninsular Malaysia
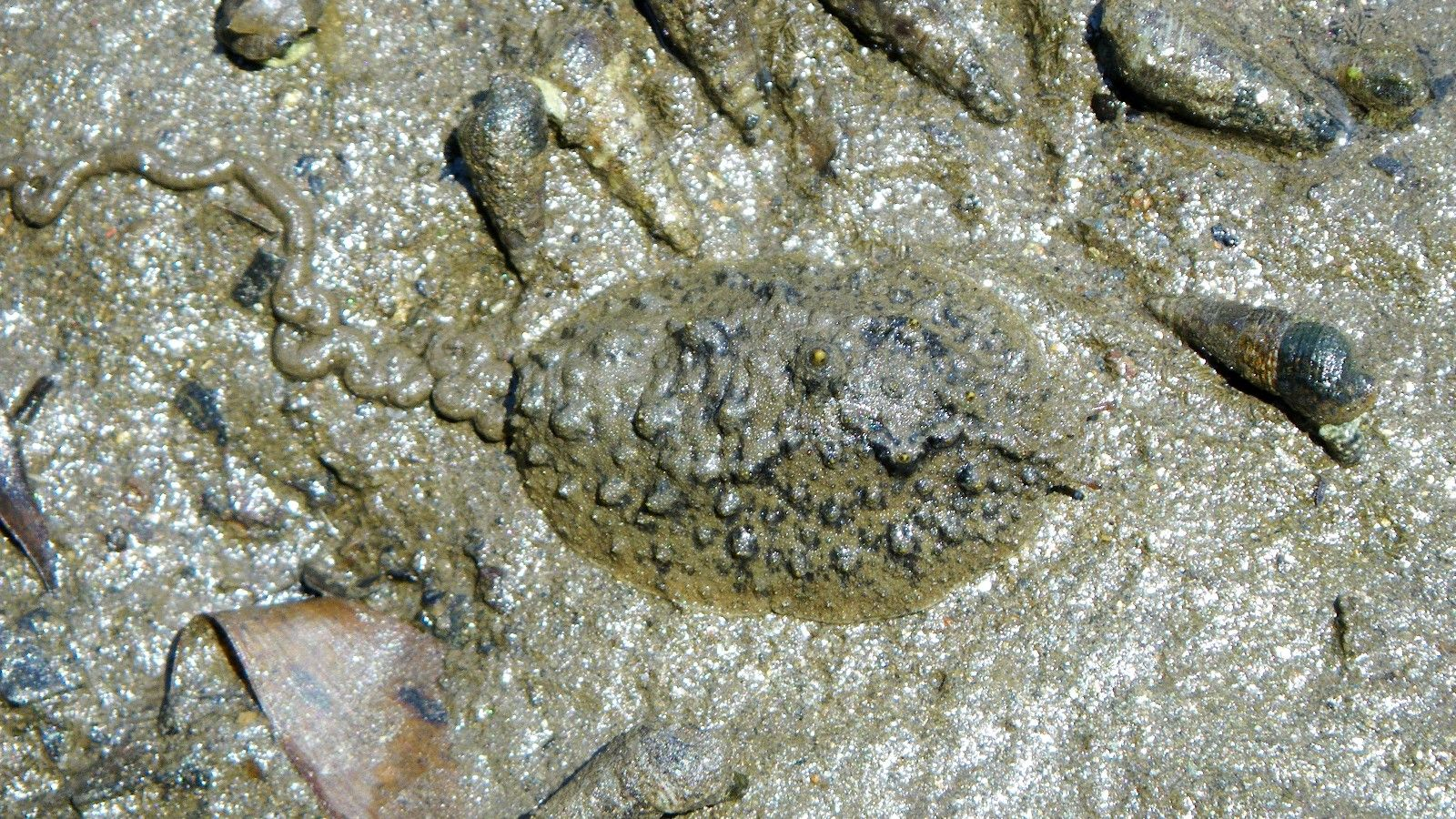
- “Onchidium hongkongensis”

Scientific classification
- Kingdom: Animalia
- Phylum: Mollusca
- Class: Gastropoda
- Order: Systellommatophora
- Family: Onchidiidae
- Genus: Onchidium; Buchannan, 1800

Type species
- Onchidium typhae Buchannan, 1800

Synonyms
- Elophilus Labbé, 1935 (invalid: junior homonym of Elophilus Meigen, 1803 [Diptera]; Labbella is a replacement name); Labbella Starobogatov, 1970; Oncidium (incorrect subsequent spelling by Agassiz (1846))

= Onchidium =

Genus of gastropods

Onchidium is a genus of marine pulmonate sea slugs that belongs to the family Onchidiidae. Members of this genus have been found nearly worldwide except for polar waters and the tropical Indo-West Pacific region.

It has a large, flattened and oblong body. Its body curves outward like a sphere making it concave. The underside of this genus is flat and smooth being black in color. It has pointed papillae on the dorsal notum and very long and thin ocular tentacles. True slugs, such as the Onchidiids which this genus is a part of, are shell-less. This genus similarly to others of this family breathe air with a lung and die if they are immersed in water for a few hours.

== Taxonomy ==
This genus was described in 1800 by Buchannan and is the type genus of the family Onchidiidae. The type species of the genus was Onchidium typhae.

Traditionally, this genus was in the past as a generic name for a number of onchidiid species. This was especially true for museum specimens of onchidiid slugs that were collected from the tropical Indo-West Pacific region. This was because the evolutionary relationship of this genus was confusing. This led to 80 species being placed in Onchidium. A taxonomic revision of the genus was made by Dayrat et al. 2016 included only three species, the type species Onchidium typhae, Onchidium reevesii, and Onchidium stuxbergi. In this study, Onchidium nigrum and Onchidium pallidipes would be classified as junior synonyms of O. stuxbergi. This classification has been strongly supported by morphological and molecular data. In 2019, Onchidium melakense would be described by Dayrat & Goulding. 2019.

=== Species ===
Some authors recognize only four species in the genus. The World Register of Marine Species (WoRMS) lists that this genus contains six accepted species however some authors recognize only four species (O. melakense, O. reevesii, O. stuxbergi and O. typhae). The six species listed in WoRMS are listed below:

- Onchidium melakense Dayrat & Goulding, 2019
- Onchidium multiradiatum C. Semper, 1882
- Onchidium nebulosum C. Semper, 1880
- Onchidium reevesii (J. E. Gray, 1850)
- Onchidium stuxbergi (Westerlund, 1883)
- Onchidium typhae Buchannan, 1800
- Onchidium multinotatum, originally described within the genus in 1883, is regarded as a nomen dubium.
- Onchidium granulosum, originally described within the genus in 1831, is regarded as a nomen dubium.
- Onchidium palaense, originally described within the genus in 1880, is regarded as a nomen dubium.
- Onchidium papuanum, originally described within the genus in 1880, is regarded as a nomen dubium.
