= Carl Semper =

German zoologist (1832–1893)

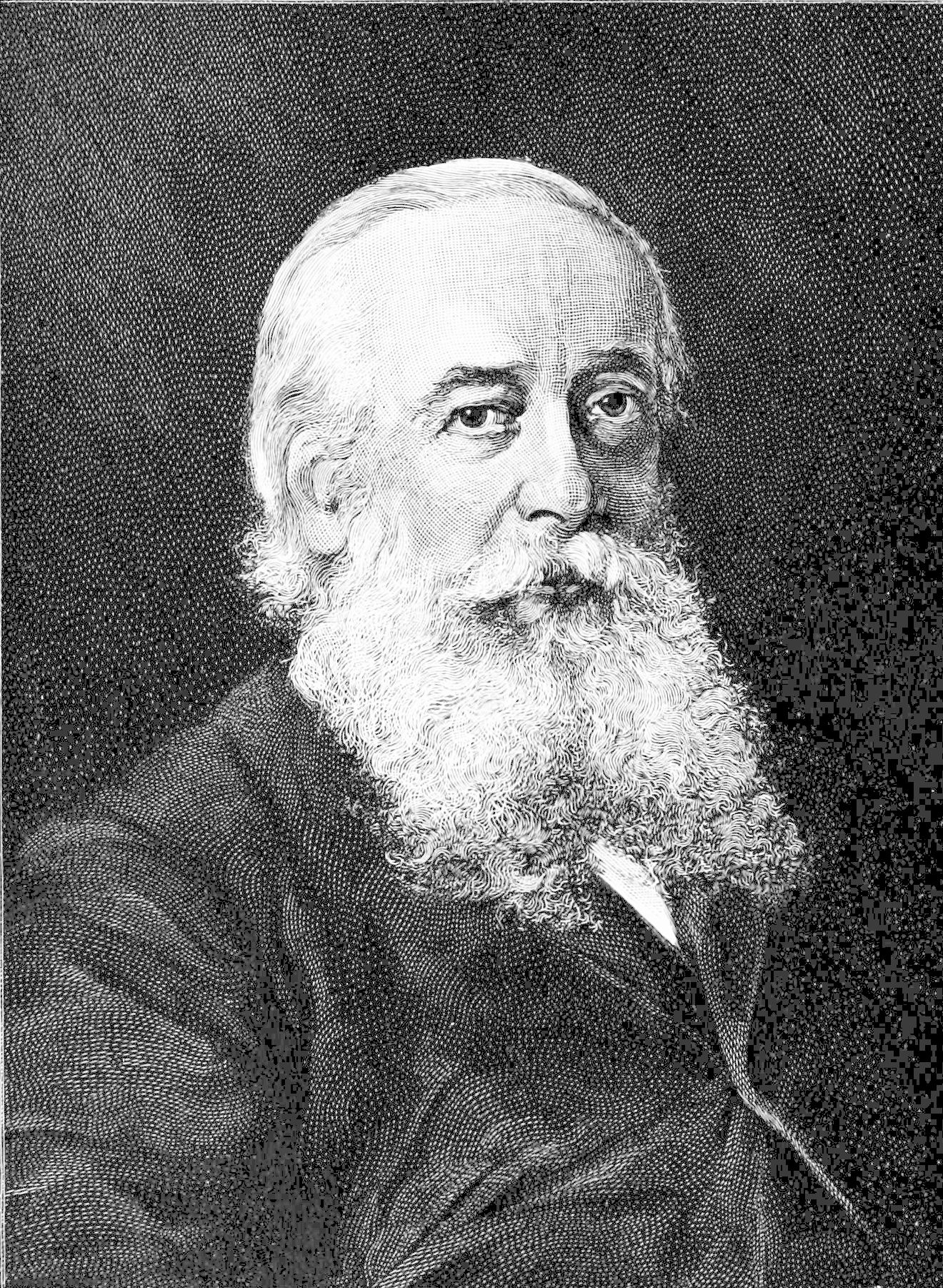
Carl Semper

Carl Gottfried Semper (July 6, 1832, Altona, Duchy of Holstein – May 29, 1893, Würzburg) was a German ethnologist and animal ecologist. His brother Georg Semper took an interest in the lepidoptera while his brother Johannes Otto Semper (1830–1907) specialized in the molluscs.

== Career ==
Semper attended the Hanover Polytechnic from 1851 to 1854 and achieved a Ph.D. in zoology from the University of Würzburg in 1856. He traveled to the Philippines and Palau two years later, staying in the region until 1865 in association with Museum Godeffroy. Semper published several works detailing his observations and experiences among Pacific peoples. In addition to his written work, he delivered lectures at the Lowell Technological Institute (now merged into the University of Massachusetts Lowell) near Boston and maintained a large collection of animal specimens. His work in Palau is especially noted as comprising one of the very few reliable accounts of cultural practices that are today severely diminished by Westernization. Semper is also praised for his humane and even-handed attitude toward indigenous cultures.

Semper was an early supporter of Darwinism in Germany. He suffered a major stroke in 1887 and died a few years later.

A species of Philippine sea snake he first collected, Hydrophis semperi, was named in his honor, as were two species of Philippine lizards, Gonocephalus semperi and Lipinia semperi.

An anatomical structure in the heads of certain gastropods was discovered by Carl Semper in 1856 and is named after him.

== Bibliography ==
- Reisen im Archipel der Philippinen (5 vol. of 10, 1868-1916)
- Palau-Inseln im Stillen Ocean (1873) scan
- Die Natürlichen Existenzbedingungen der Thiere (1880)
