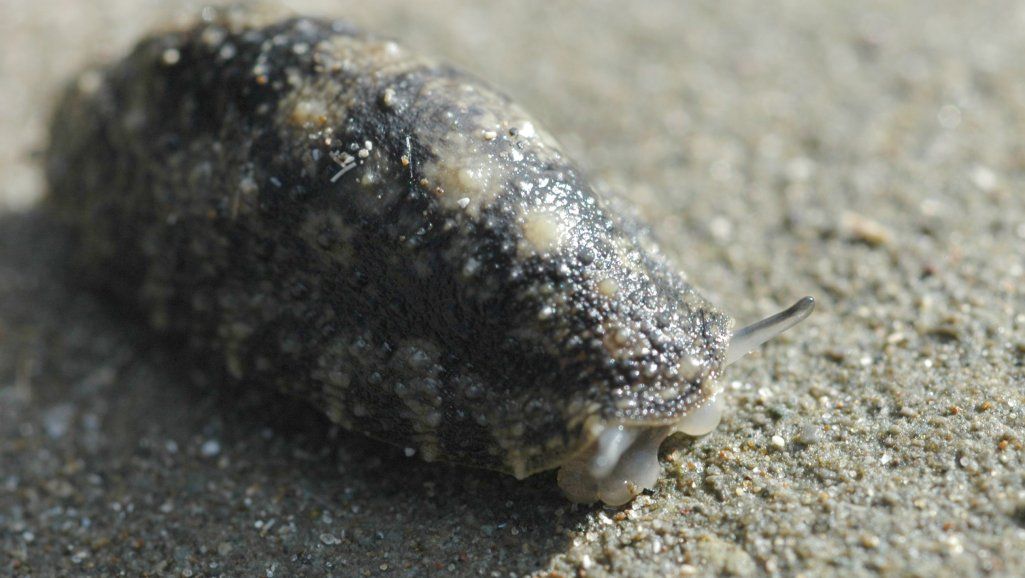
- A live but partially retracted individual of Onchidella sp.
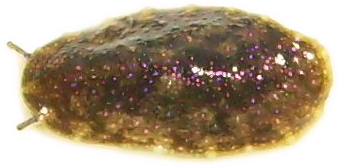
- A live and active individual of Onchidella nigricans

Scientific classification
- Kingdom: Animalia
- Phylum: Mollusca
- Class: Gastropoda
- Order: Systellommatophora
- Superfamily: Onchidioidea; Rafinesque, 1815
- Family: Onchidiidae; Rafinesque, 1815

Genera
- See text

Synonyms
- Hoffmannolidae Starobogatov, 1976; Onchidinidae Starobogatov, 1976; Onchidellidae Labbé, 1934; Peroniidae Keferstein, 1865; Peroninidae Starobogatov, 1976; Platevindecidae Starobogatov, 1976; Quoyellidae Starobogatov, 1976; Scaphidae Labbé, 1934

= Onchidiidae =

Family of gastropods

Onchidiidae are a family of small, air-breathing sea (and land) slugs. They are shell-less marine (except for two species) pulmonate gastropod molluscs. Onchidiidae is the only family within the superfamily Onchidioidea.

These animals are quite unusual in that they are emphatically not opisthobranchs with gills, as are almost all of the sea slugs. Instead these creatures are pulmonates. They are more closely related to air-breathing land and freshwater snails and slugs than they are to most other sea snails and sea slugs.

This family has no subfamilies (according to the taxonomy of the Gastropoda by Bouchet & Rocroi, 2005).

143 species names were created within the Onchidiidae, but until recently few species could be identified. In the late 1920s Hoffmann revised the family (based on the descriptions), and classified the described species into genera. Labbé later continued the revision and named many new genera in his classification of onchidiid slugs. Labbé also made mistakes in describing the anatomy of some species, and the Onchidiidae was not revised again for over 80 years. The genus Onchidium was revised in 2016 based on natural history, comparative anatomy, and DNA sequences. This was followed by revisions of the other onchidiid genera, and the descriptions of onchidiid species in several new genera.

== Anatomy ==
Adult onchidiids lack a shell, although a shell and operculum are present at the larval stage. The mantle cavity is reduced to the point of absence, correlating with a loss of gills, raphes, and other characterstics usually found in the mantle cavity. The organism is completely detorted.

Slugs in this family make and use love darts made of chitin.

== Genetics ==
In this family, the number of haploid chromosomes lies between 16 and 20 (according to the values in this table).

== Habitat ==
Most of the species in this family are marine and are found in the intertidal zone. Many species live on rocky coasts, while others live in mangrove forests which may be marine or brackish. Onchidium stuxbergi (as E. ajuthiae, synonym in literature) was previously considered to be a fresh water species, but the species is now recognized to be found in brackish water habitats.

Remarkably, some onchidiid species are completely terrestrial. Semperoncis montana (synonym in literature: Platevindex apoikistes and Semperella montana) and Platevindex ponsonbyi are the only known terrestrial species in the Onchidiidae. They live in high-elevation rainforests in Borneo and the Philippines.

== Life habits ==
All these slugs breathe air. The marine ones breathe and move around and feed during low tide, when the water recedes and the slugs are exposed to the air.

== Genera ==
Genera in the family Onchidiidae include:

- Alionchis Goulding and Dayrat, 2018
- Hoffmannola Strand, 1932
- Laspionchis Dayrat & Goulding, 2019
- Marmaronchis Dayrat & Goulding, 2018
- Melayonchis Dayrat and Goulding, 2017
- Onchidella Gray, 1850
- Onchidina Semper, 1885
- Onchidium Buchanan, 1800 - type genus
- Paromoionchis Dayrat & Goulding, 2019
- Peronia Fleming, 1822
- Peronina Plate, 1893
- Platevindex Baker, 1938
- Semperoncis Starobogatov, 1976
- Wallaconchis Goulding and Dayrat, 2018

Synonymized genera

- Arctonchis Dall, 1910: synonym of Onchidella J. E. Gray, 1850
- Elophilus Labbé, 1935: synonym of Onchidium Buchanan, 1800
- Eudrastus Gistel, 1848: synonym of Peronia Fleming, 1822
- Labbella Starobogatov, 1976: synonym of Onchidium Buchanan, 1800
- Lessonia Labbé, 1934: synonym of Peronia Fleming, 1822
- Lessonina Starobogatov, 1976: synonym of Peronia Fleming, 1822
- Occidentella Hoffmann, 1929: synonym of Onchidella J. E. Gray, 1850
- Oncidiella P. Fischer & Crosse, 1878: synonym of Onchidella J.E. Gray, 1850
- Oncidina Plate, 1893: synonym of Onchidina Semper, 1882
- Oncis Plate, 1893: synonym of Platevindex H. B. Baker, 1938
- Paraoncidium Labbé, 1934: synonym of Onchidina Semper, 1882
- Paraperonia Labbé, 1934: synonym of Peronia Fleming, 1822
- Peronella Mörch, 1863: synonym of Onchidella J.E. Gray, 1850
- Peroniella Starobogatov, 1976 : synonym of Onchidella J. E. Gray, 1850
- Quoya Labbé, 1934: synonym of Peronia J. Fleming, 1822
- Quoyella Starobogatov, 1976: Peronia J. Fleming, 1822
- Scaphis Labbé, 1934: synonym of Peronia J. Fleming, 1822
- Semperella Labbé, 1934 synonym of Semperoncis Starobogatov, 1976
- Watsoniella Hoffmann, 1928: synonym of Hoffmannola Strand, 1932
