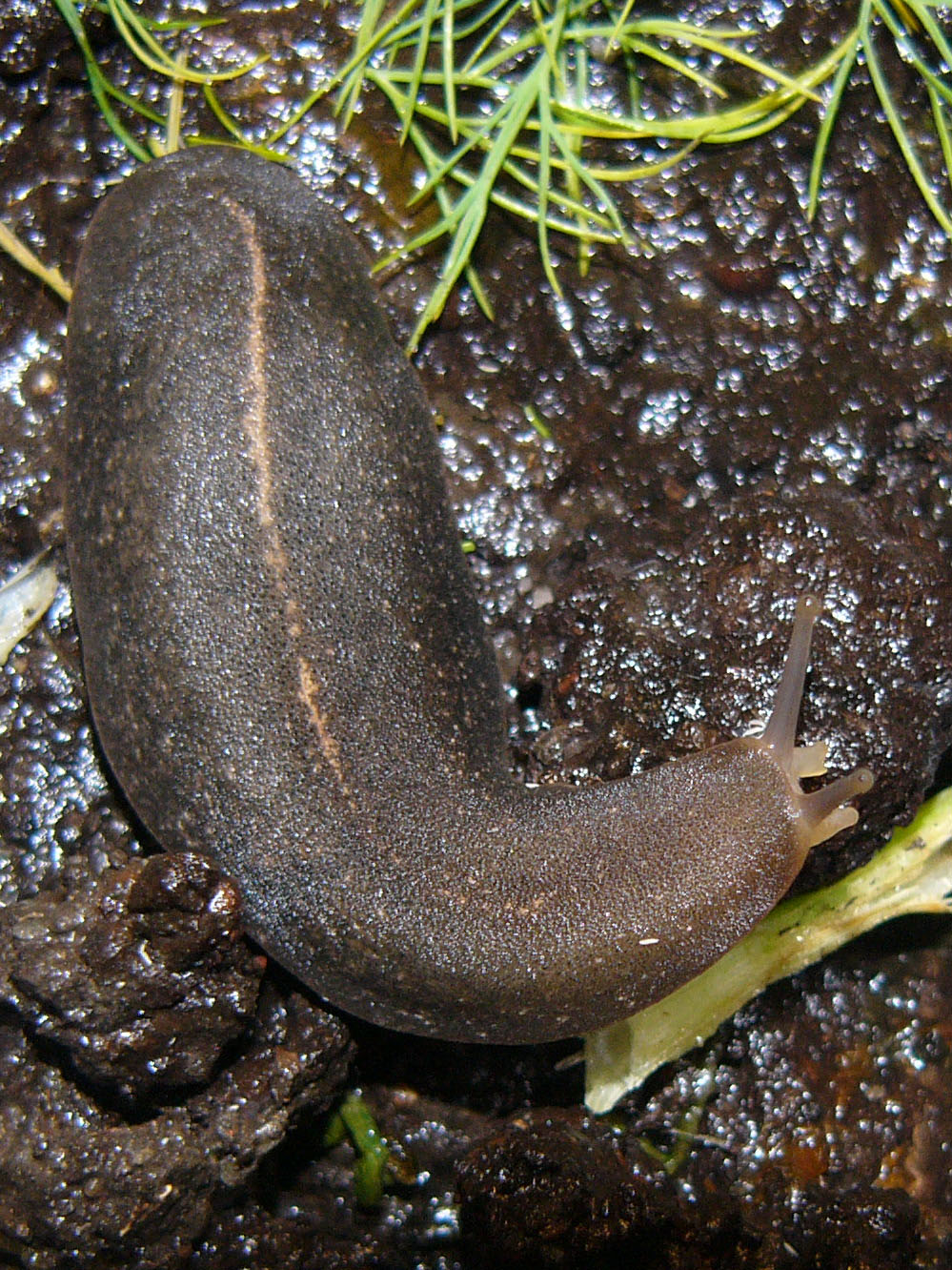
- Land slug Laevicaulis alte (Veronicelloidea)
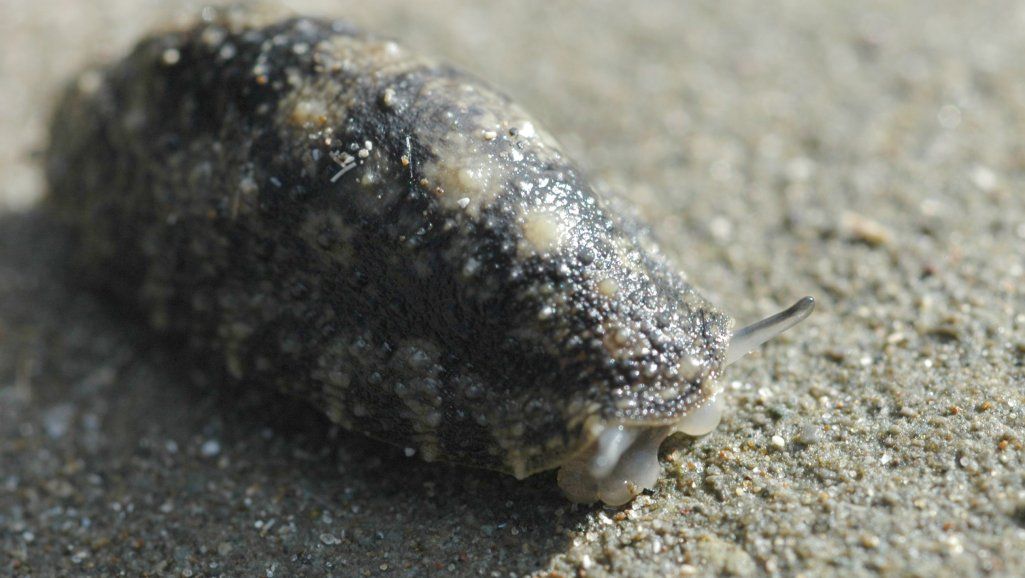
- Sea slug Onchidella sp. (Onchidioidea)

Scientific classification
- Kingdom: Animalia
- Phylum: Mollusca
- Class: Gastropoda
- Superorder: Eupulmonata
- Order: Systellommatophora

Families
- See text

Synonyms
- Gymnomorpha

= Systellommatophora =

Clade of gastropods

The Systellommatophora (synonym Gymnomorpha) is a clade of primitive, air-breathing slugs, according to the taxonomy of the Gastropoda (Bouchet & Rocroi, 2005).

They are marine and terrestrial pulmonate gastropods within the Heterobranchia. There are two superfamilies in this clade. Slugs in the superfamily Onchidioidea are primarily marine (except for five land-dwelling or freshwater species), whereas slugs in the superfamily Veronicelloidea are primarily terrestrial.

== Anatomy ==
No species in this clade has a shell as an adult. These slugs are distinguished by the location of the anus at the rear of the body.

Although neither superfamily bears shells as adults, the Onchidioidea do possess a vestigial, non-mineralized shell sac and possess a larval shell. It is not known whether or not the veronicellids bear a larval shell.

== Taxonomy ==
According to the previous taxonomy of the Gastropoda (Ponder & Lindberg, 1997) Systellommatophora was considered to be a suborder or an order.

The following two superfamilies and families have been recognized in the taxonomy of Bouchet & Rocroi (2005):

- superfamily Onchidioidea Rafinesque, 1815
  - Onchidiidae Rafinesque, 1815
- Superfamily Veronicelloidea Gray, 1840
  - Veronicellidae Gray, 1840
  - Rathouisiidae Heude, 1885
