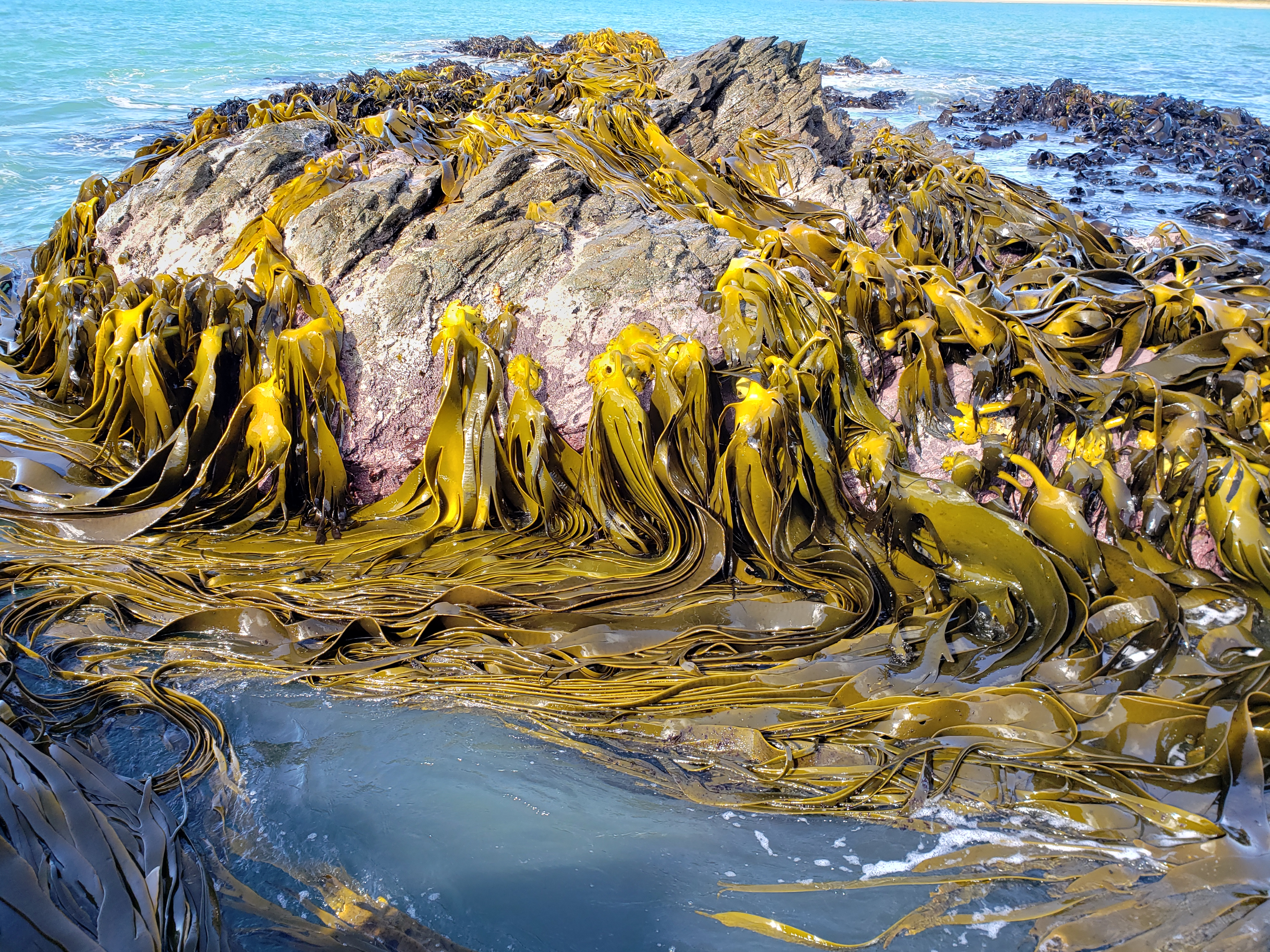
- Durvillaea antarctica and D. willana on Taieri Island

Scientific classification
- Domain: Eukaryota
- Clade: Sar
- Clade: Stramenopiles
- Division: Ochrophyta
- Class: Phaeophyceae
- Order: Fucales
- Family: Durvillaeaceae (Oltmanns) De Toni
- Genus: Durvillaea; Bory

Type species
- D. antarctica (Chamisso) Hariot

Species
- See text

= Durvillaea =

Genus of seaweeds

Durvillaea is a genus of large brown algae in the monotypic family Durvillaeaceae. All members of the genus are found in the southern hemisphere, including Australia, New Zealand, South America, and various subantarctic islands. Durvillaea, commonly known as southern bull kelps, occur on rocky, wave-exposed shorelines and provide a habitat for numerous intertidal organisms. Many species exhibit a honeycomb-like structure in their fronds that provides buoyancy, which allows individuals detached from substrates to raft alive at sea, permitting dispersal for hundreds of days over thousands of kilometres. Durvillaea species have been used for clothing, tools and as a food source by many indigenous cultures throughout the South Pacific, and they continue to play a prominent role in Chilean cuisine.

== Common name and etymology ==
The common name for Durvillaea is southern bull kelp. This is often shortened to bull kelp, which can generate confusion with the North Pacific kelp species Nereocystis luetkeana.

The genus is named after French explorer Jules Dumont d'Urville (1790-1842).

== Description ==
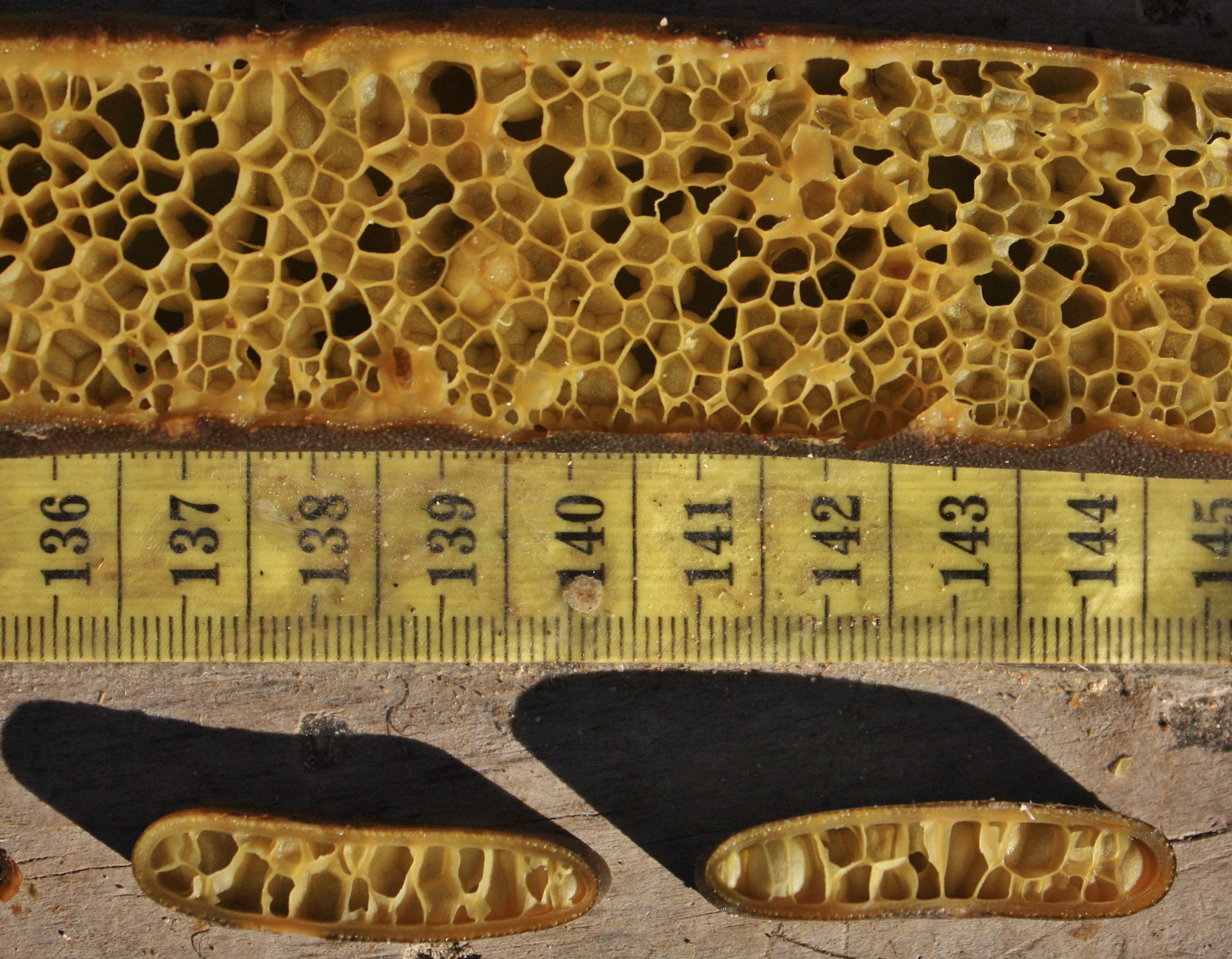
Cross-section of D. antarctica showing the 'honeycomb' structure of the blades

Durvillaea species are dioecious. Based on the concentration of pigments in thalli, males and females of D. antarctica do not significantly differ in colouration. Holdfasts of males and females can be joined together.

Durvillaea species are characterised by their prolific growth and plastic morphology.

Three species, Durvillaea incurvata, D. antarctica, D. poha are buoyant due to a honeycomb-like structure in the fronds of the kelp that holds air. When these species detach from the seabed, this buoyancy allows for individuals to drift for substantial distances, permitting long distance dispersal. In contrast, species as D. willana lack such 'honeycomb' tissue and are non-buoyant, preventing the individuals from moving long distances.

== Ecology ==
Durvillaea bull kelp grow within intertidal and shallow subtidal areas, typically on rocky wave-exposed coastal sites. D. antarctica and D. poha are intertidal, whereas D. willana is subtidal (to 6 m depths). Intertidal species can grow at the uppermost limit of the intertidal zone if there is sufficient wave wash. Species can withstand a high level of disturbance from wave action, although storms can remove individuals from substrates.

Research on the bacteria associated with Durvillaea indicates that local environmental conditions shape external microbiome diversity significantly. Further research suggests that the diversity of bacterial microbiomes associated with D. antarctica is influenced by the density and connectivity of the host kelp populations.

Durvillaea southern bull kelp
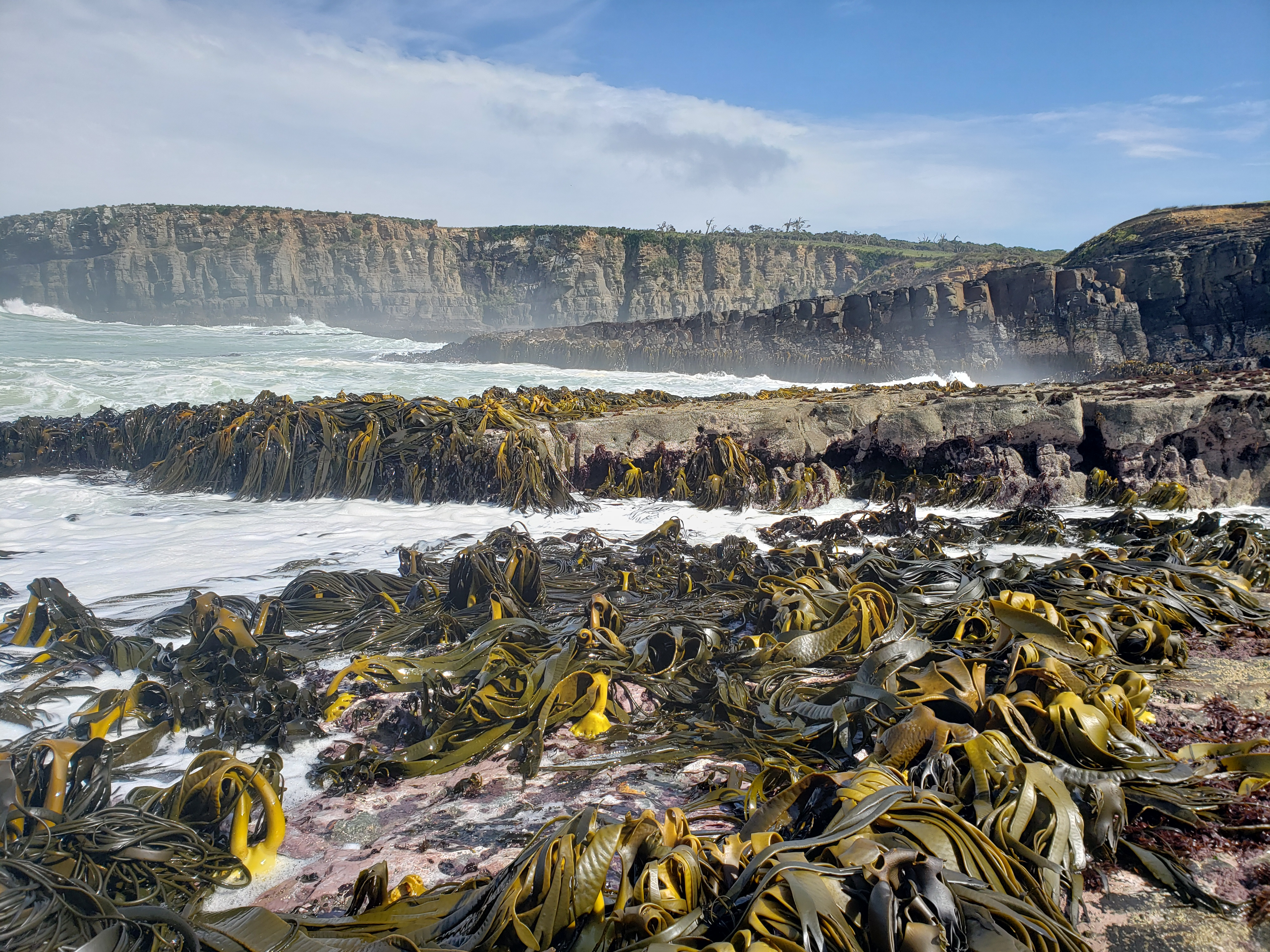
D. poha, D. antarctica, and D. willana on the Tautuku Peninsula

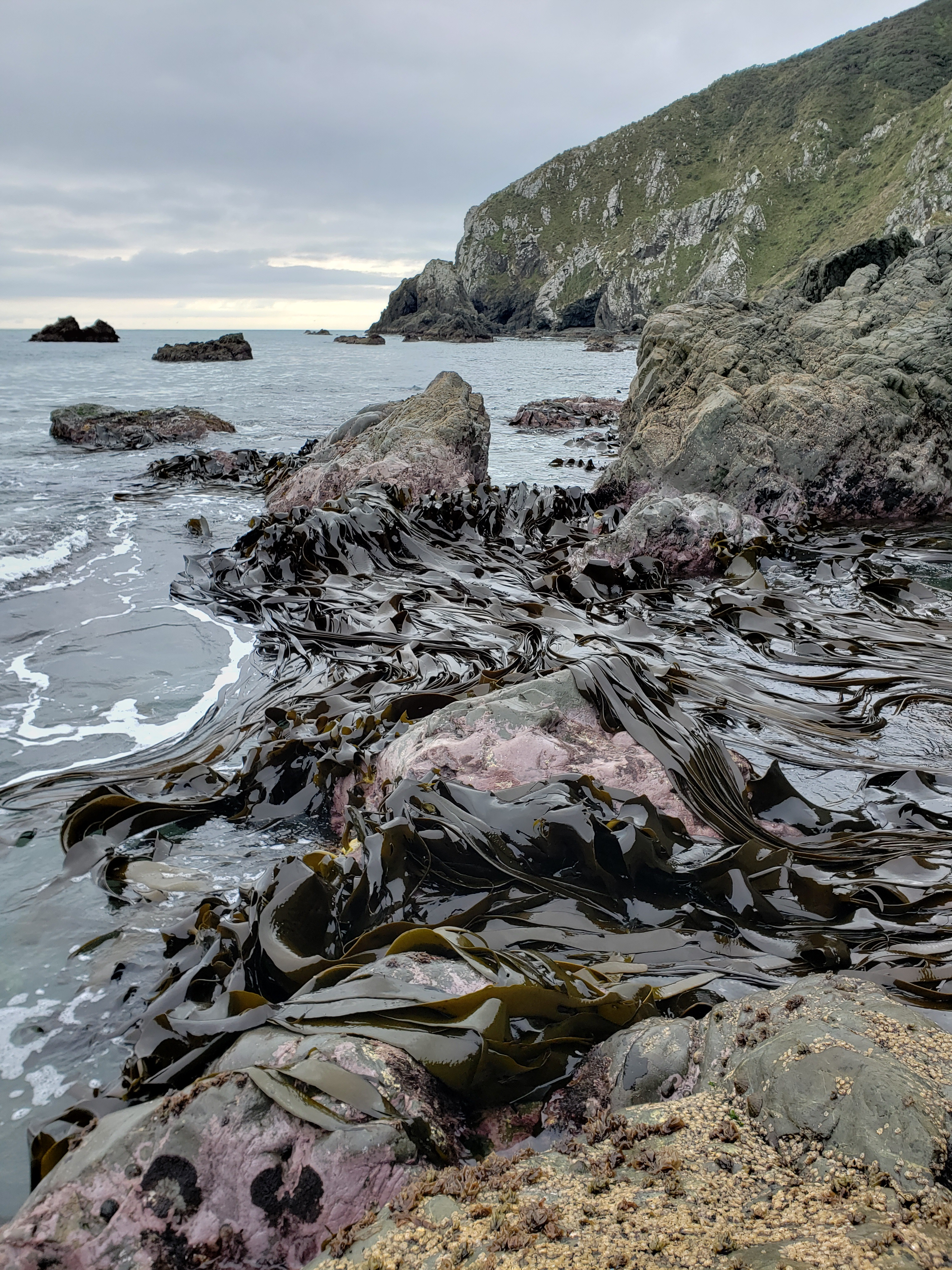
D. antarctica growing at Boom Rock, Wellington

D. antarctica at Manurewa Point, in the Wairarapa

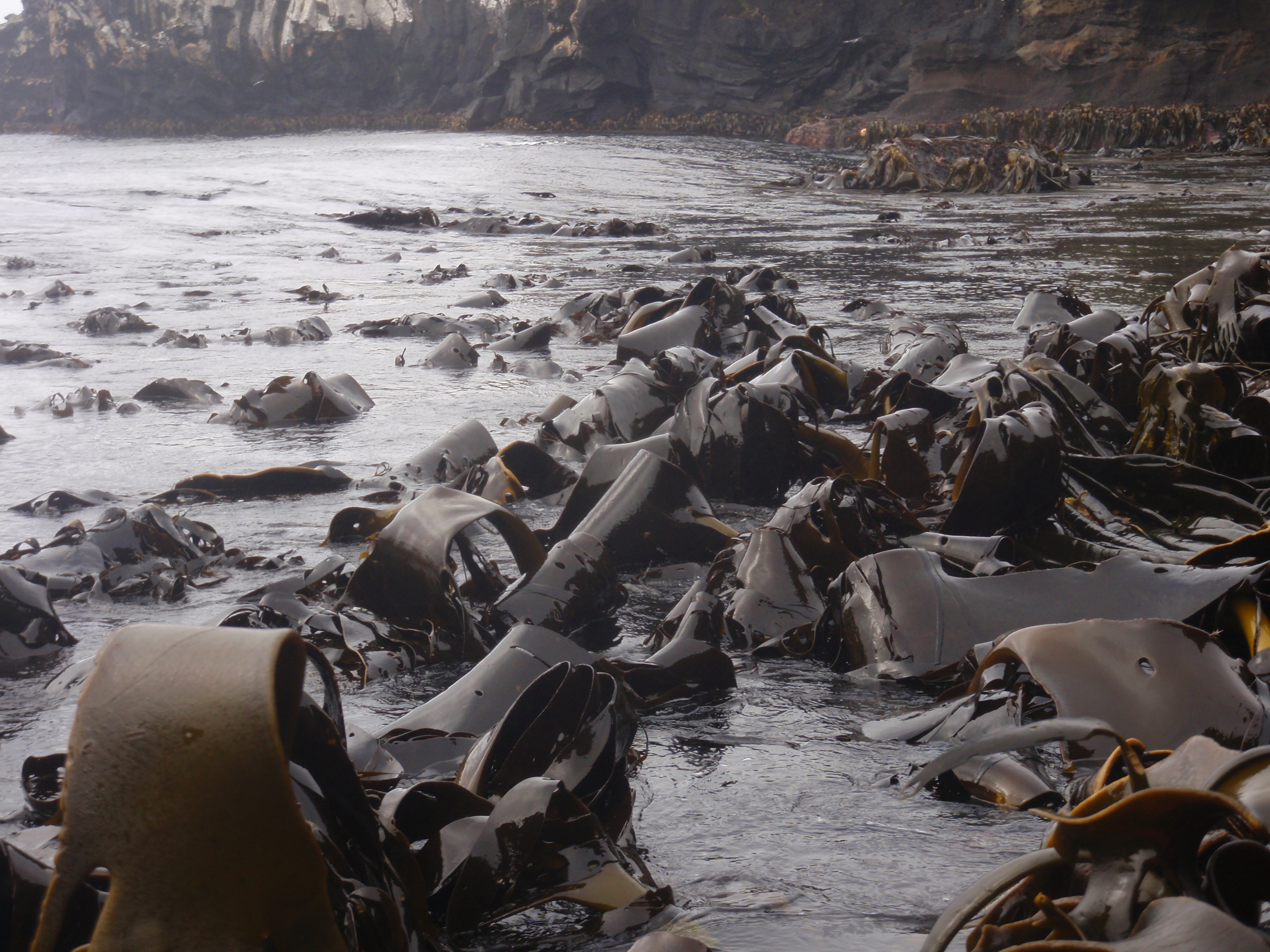
D. fenestrata growing in the Antipodes Islands

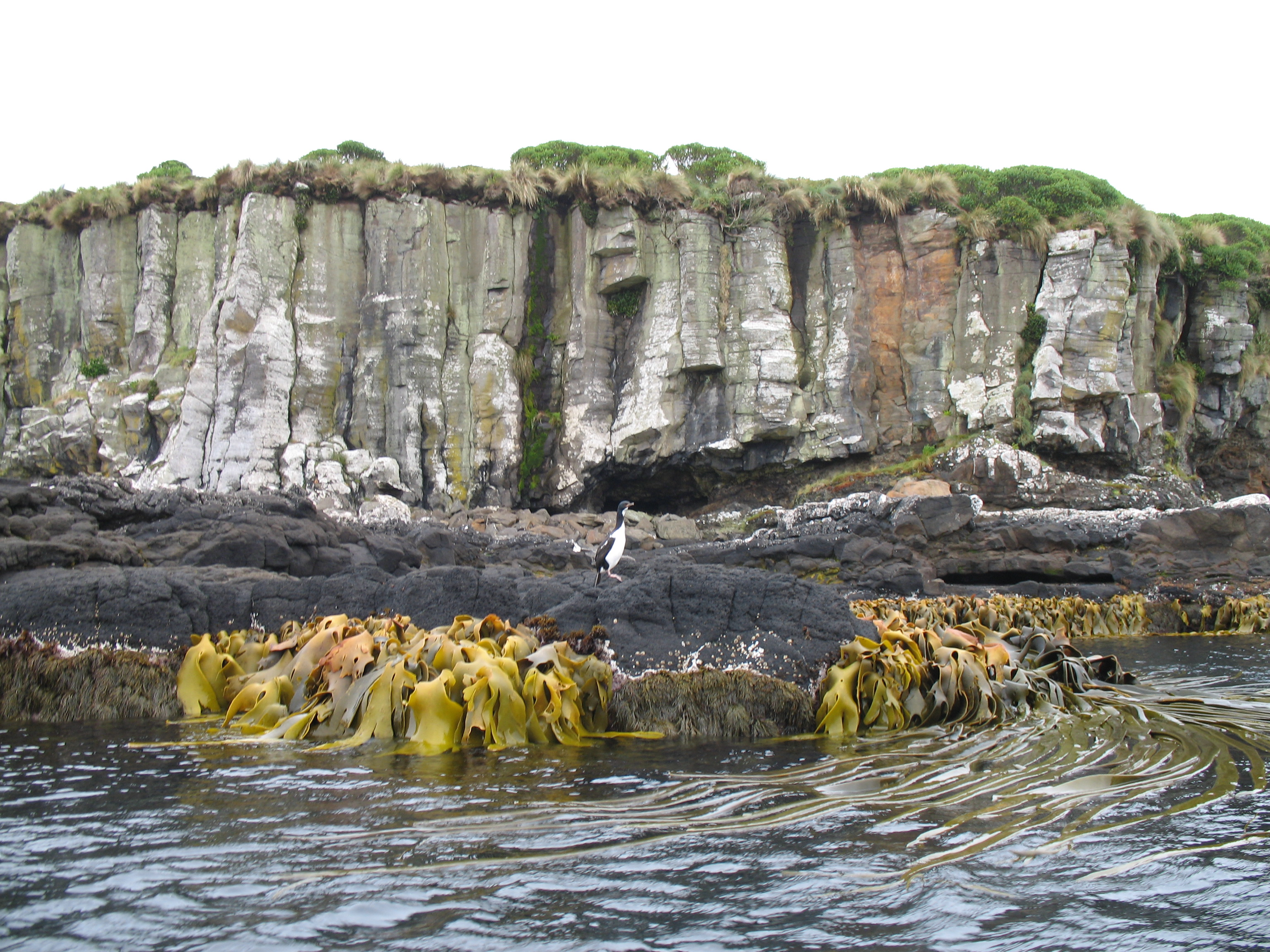
Durvillaea kelp on Enderby Island

=== Epibionts, parasites and rafting ===
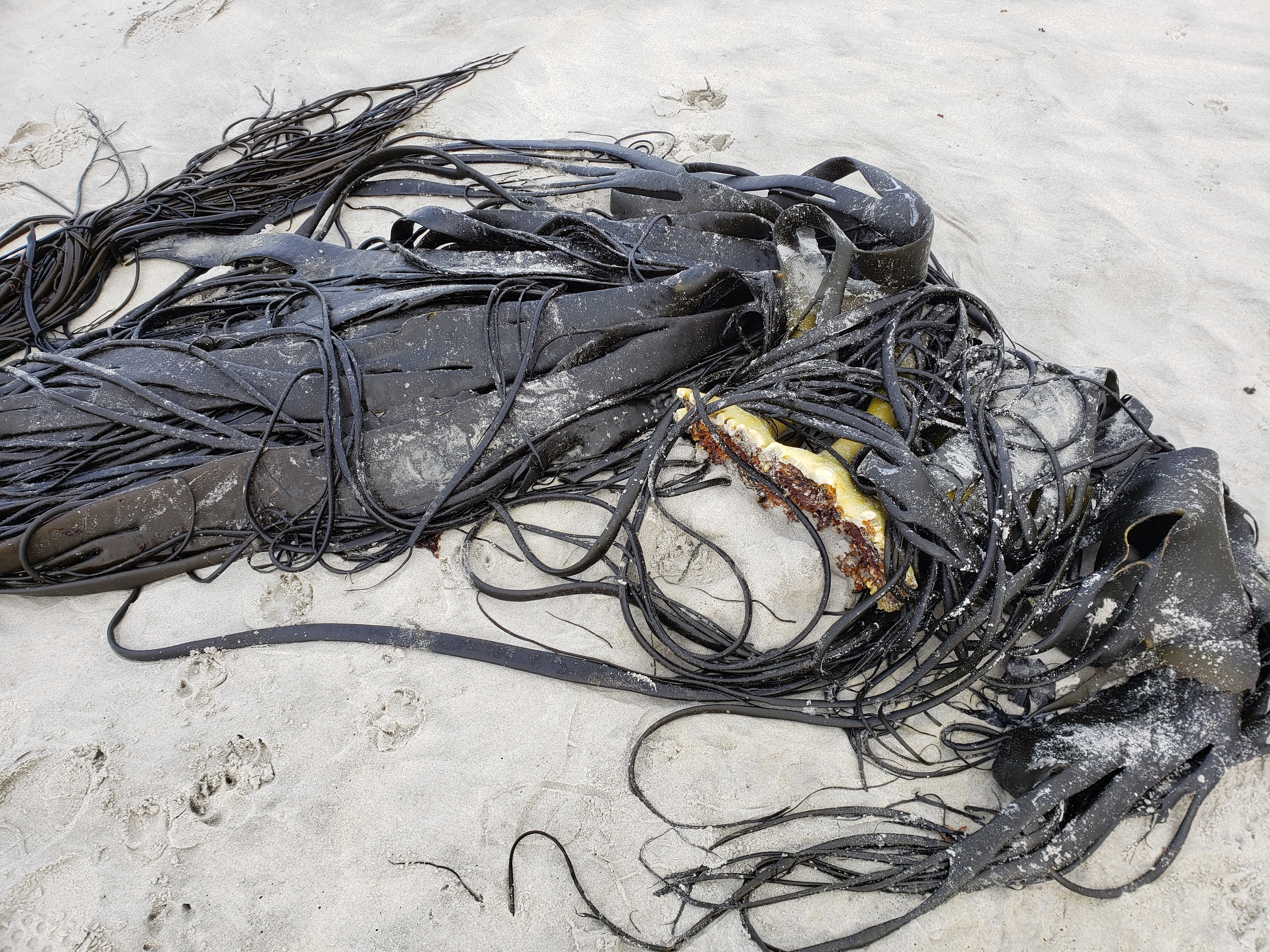
Beachcast D. antarctica at St Kilda Beach, Dunedin

Holdfasts of D. antarctica and other species are often inhabited by a diverse array of epifaunal and infaunal invertebrates, many of which burrow into and graze on the kelp. In New Zealand, species that inhabit Durvillaea include the sea-star Anasterias suteri, crustaceans such as Parawaldeckia kidderi, P. karaka, and the gribbles Limnoria segnis and L. stephenseni, as well as the molluscs Cantharidus roseus, Onchidella marginata, Onithochiton neglectus, and Sypharochiton sinclairi, and the spider Desis marina.

Durvillaea individuals can detach from substrates, particularly during storms. Once detached, buoyant species such as D. antarctica and D. poha can float as rafts, and can travel vast distances at sea, driven by ocean currents. Specimens of D. antarctica have been found to float for up to 210 days, during which time high wind speeds transport kelp rafts up to 10,000 km. Environmental factors such as temperature, solar radiation and surface winds (all of which vary with latitude) affect buoyancy of southern bull kelp rafts and their rate of travel. Rafts of D. antarctica are more likely to disperse offshore if individuals detach during outgoing tides during autumn and winter. Rafts of Kelp-associated invertebrates inside holdfasts and external epiphytes can be transported by rafting individuals, potentially leading to long-distance dispersal and a significant impact upon the population genetic structure of the invertebrate species. Attached male and female individuals can raft together, providing an opportunity for reproduction. Rafts of D. antarctica currently reach Antarctica, although freezing negative impacts the buoyancy and photosynthetic activity of D. antarctica tissue, which may affect the viability and reproductive capability of rafts.

Rafts of Durvillaea can be colonised by the goose barnacles Lepas australis and L. pectinata. Beachcast, decomposing bull-kelp is colonised and consumed by a wide variety of invertebrates including sandhoppers Bellorchestia quoyana, and kelp flies Chaetocoelopa littoralis.

Other seaweeds including Gelidium lingulatum, G. rex, Corallina officinalis var. chilensis, and Lessonia spicata also grow as epiphytes in the holdfasts of D. antarctica. Rafting on D. antarctica appears to have influenced the dispersal and phylogeography of these non-buoyant species. In New Zealand, Durvillaea fronds can also be infected by the obligate red algal epiphyte Pyrophyllon subtumens (J. Agardh ex R.M. Laing) W.A. Nelson 2003.

Fronds of D. antarctica can be infected by an endophytic, phaeophycean algal parasite Herpodiscus durvillaeae (Lindauer) G.R. South. Fronds can also be infected by Maullinia, a genus of intracellular, protistan parasites. Based on genetic evidence, both H. durvillaeae and Maullinia have probably been dispersed across the Southern Hemisphere via rafting bull kelp.

Parasites of Durvillaea southern bull kelp
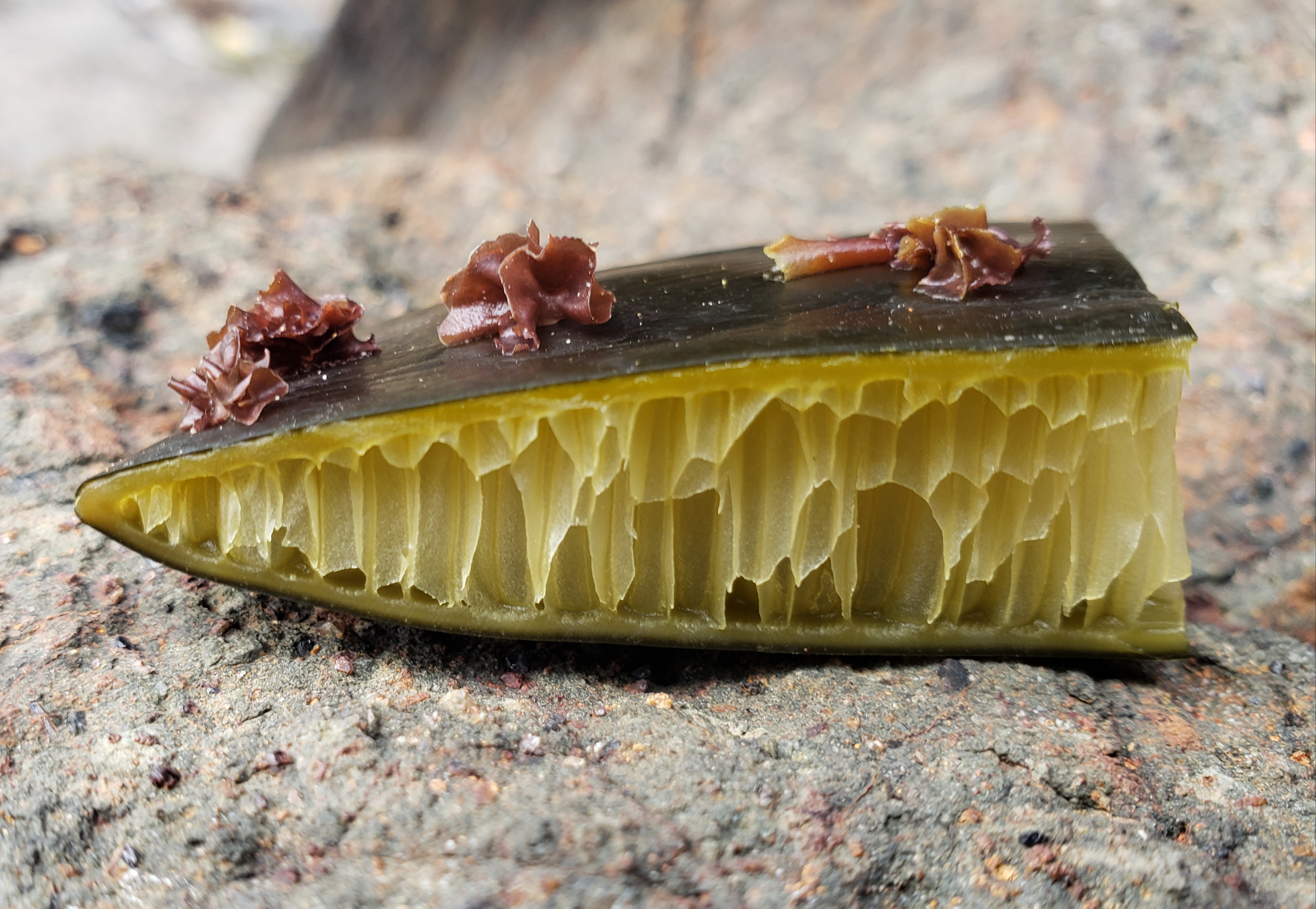
Cross-section of a D. antarctica frond, showing Pyrophyllon subtumens growing on the outer surface

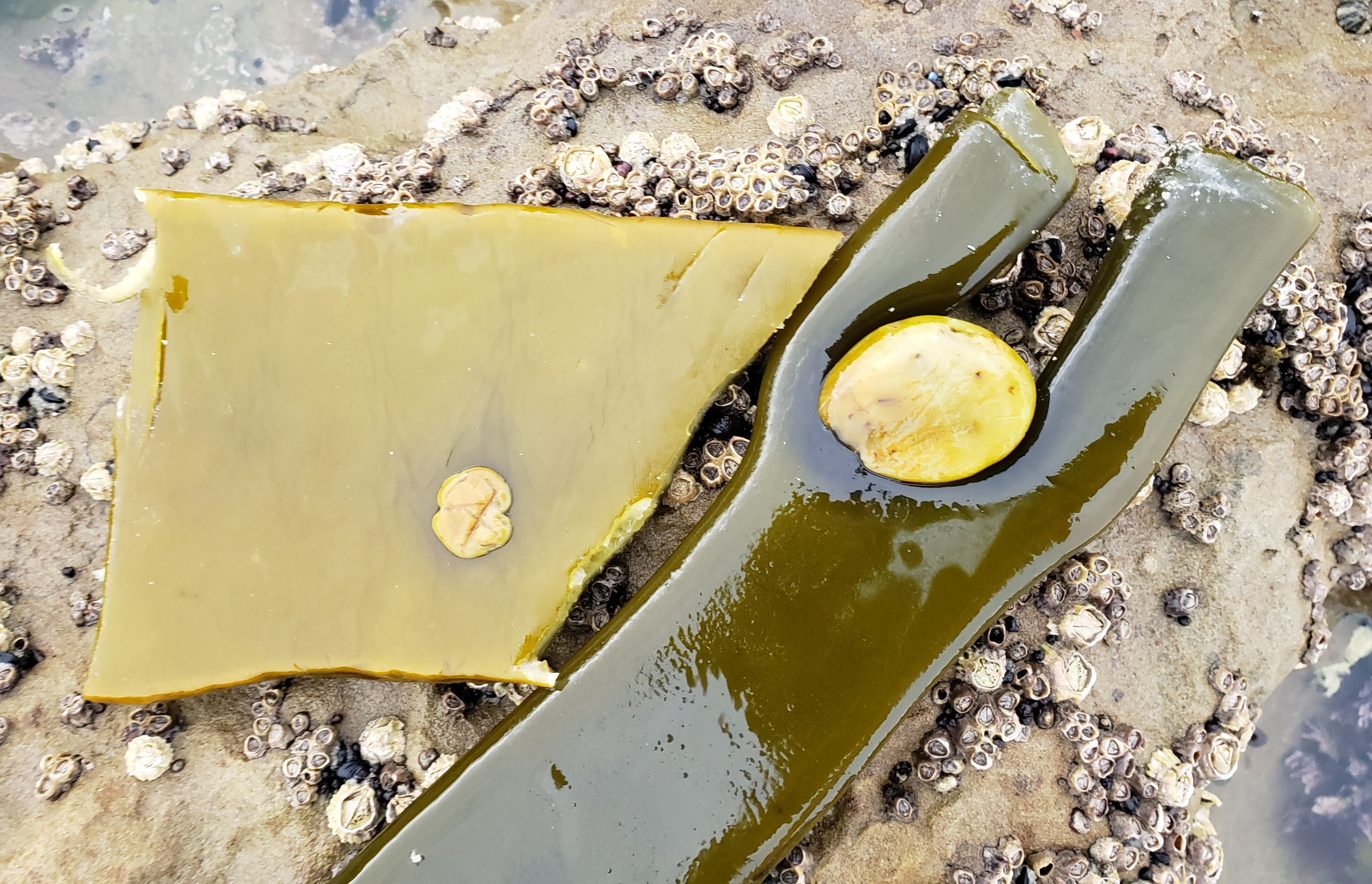
Yellow galls caused by Maullinia infections in fronds of D. poha and D. antarctica

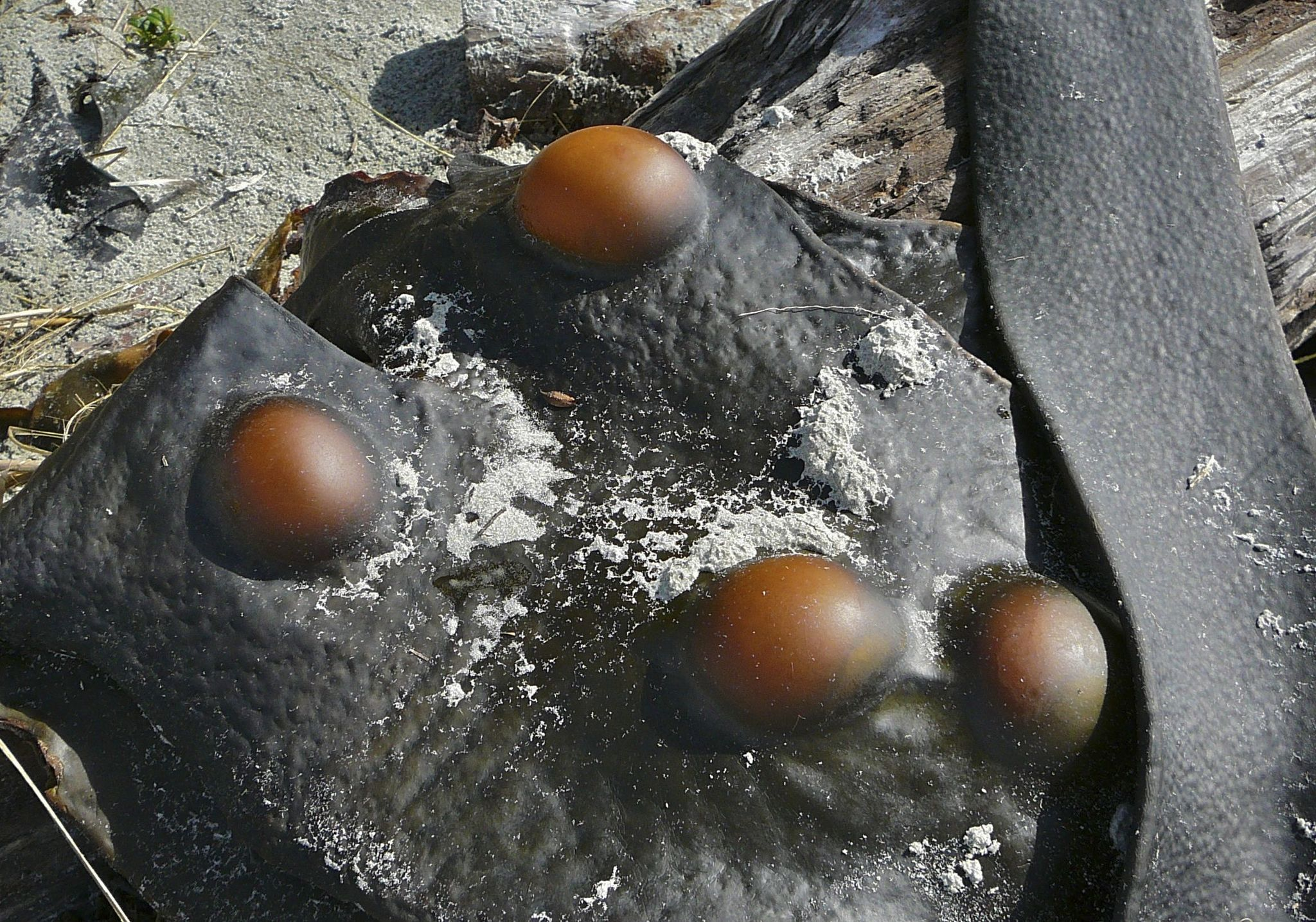
Beachcast D. antarctica kelp frond with blisters caused by an infection

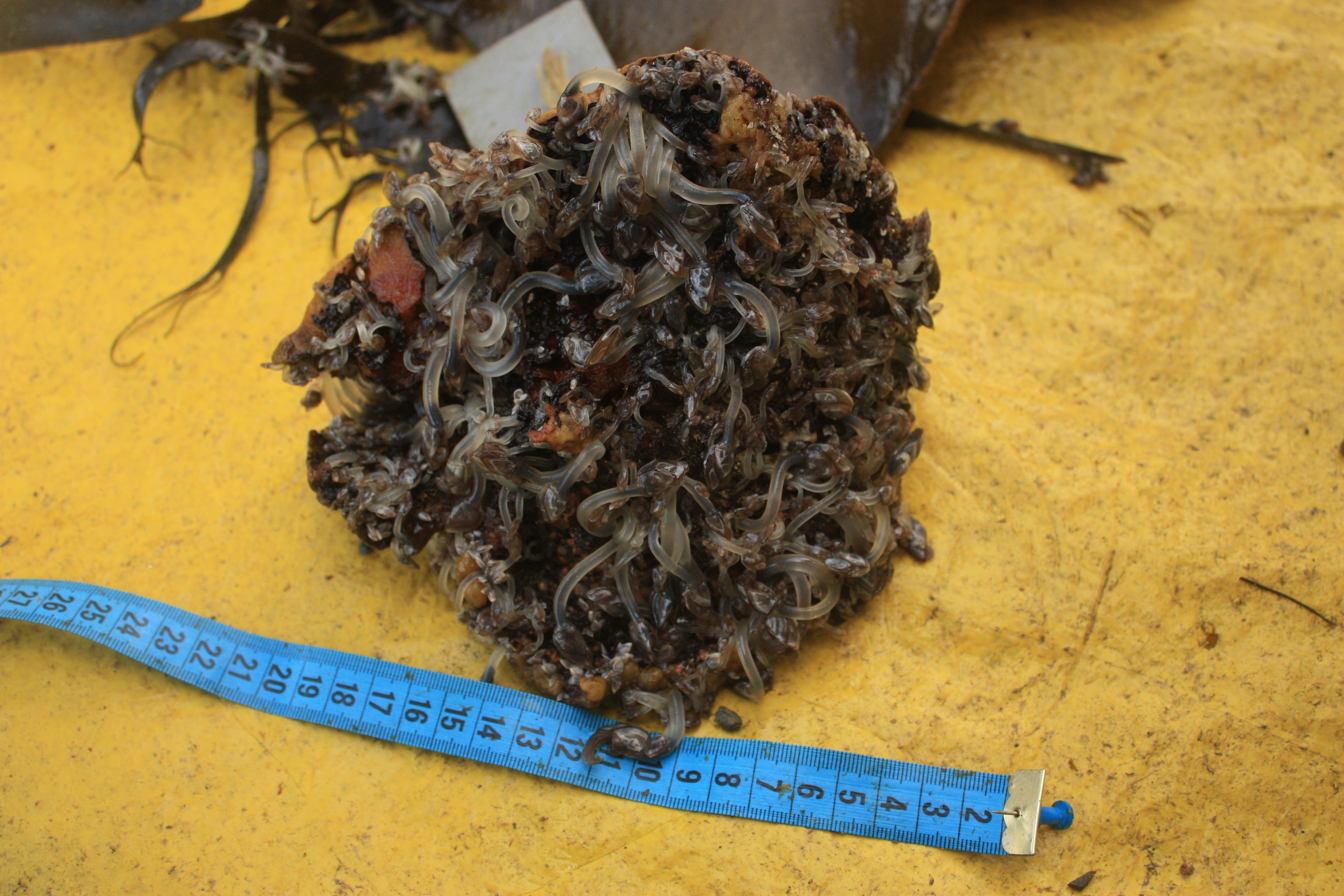
A detached holdfast of D. antarctica found off Chile, colonised by the goose barnacle Lepas australis

=== Environmental stressors ===
Increased temperatures and heatwaves, increased sedimentation, and invasive species (such as Undaria pinnatifida) are sources of physiological stress and disturbance for members of the genus.

A marine heatwave in the summer of 2017/18 appears to have caused the local extinction of multiple Durvillaea species at Pile Bay, on the Banks Peninsula. Once the kelp was extirpated, the invasive kelp Undaria pinnatifida recruited in high densities.

== Disturbance from earthquake uplift ==
Earthquake uplift that raises the intertidal zone by as little as 1.5 metres can cause Durvillaea bull kelp to die off in large numbers. Increased sedimentation following landslides caused by earthquakes is also detrimental. Once an area is cleared of Durvillaea following an uplift event, the bull kelp that re-colonises the area can potentially originate from genetically distinct populations far outside the uplift zone, spread via long distance-dispersal.

Intertidal species of Durvillaea can be used to estimate earthquake uplift height, with comparable results to traditional methods such as lidar. However, since Durvillaea holdfasts often grow at the uppermost limit of the intertidal zone, these uplift estimates are slightly less accurate compared to measures derived from other intertidal kelp such as Carpophyllum maschalocarpum.

=== Chile ===
The 2010 Chile earthquake caused significant coastal uplift (~0.2 to 3.1 m), particularly around the Gulf of Arauco, Santa María Island and the Bay of Concepción. This uplift caused large scale die offs of D. antarctica and dramatically affected the intertidal community. The damage to infrastructure and ecological disturbance caused by the earthquake was assessed to be particularly damaging for seaweed gatherers and cochayuyo harvest.

=== New Zealand ===
==== Akatore ====
Duvillaea bull kelp diversity appears to have been affected by uplift along the Akatore fault zone. Phylogeographic analyses using mitochondrial COX1 sequence data and genotyping by sequencing data for thousands of anonymous nuclear loci, indicate that a historic uplift event (800 – 1400 years before present) along the fault zone and subsequent recolonisation, has left a lasting impact upon the genetic diversity of the intertidal species D. antarctica and D. poha, but not on the subtidal species D. willana. Such a genetic impact may support the founder takes all hypothesis. Further genetic analysis has revealed that the population structure of two epifaunal species, the gribble L. segnis and the chiton O. neglectus, closely matches the pattern observed in the intertidal host species of Durvillaea along the Akatore fault zone. However, no matching pattern was observed for another epifaunal species, the amphipod P. karaka, most likely because this species has better swimming potential and can rely upon other host seaweeds.

==== Kaikoura ====
A substantial die off of Durvillaea bull kelp occurred along the Kaikoura coastline following the 2016 Kaikoura earthquake, which caused uplift up to 6 metres. The loss of Durvillaea kelp caused ecological disturbance, significantly affecting the biodiversity of the local intertidal community. Aerial drone imaging two years after the earthquake indicated that Durvillaea abundance remained low on reefs with significant uplift, but it revealed offshore refuge populations less frequently detected by field researchers.

A genetic analysis indicated that some of the Durvillaea that subsequently reached the affected coastline (i.e. potential colonists) came from areas >1,200 kilometres away. For another study, researchers sampled dying D. antarctica immediately after the earthquake to capture the 'pre-uplift' population genomic diversity and they subsequently sampled new recruits of D. antarctica within the newly formed intertidal zone to estimate 'post-uplift' population structure. Population genomic analysis indicated little change in genetic diversity within four years of recolonisation by D. antarctica. Based on those genomic results, combined with field observations of the recovery of Durvillaea throughout the uplift zone, and oceanographic connectivity modelling, it was hypothesised that the surviving populations of D. antarctica (typically sparse and lower within the intertidal zone) have dominated the early recolonisation. The researchers argued that the newly formed coastline has not yet been fully recolonised though, and the population structure and genomic diversity of D. antarctica in the Kaikoura region is likely to change over coming decades.

A genetic study investigated bacteria associated with D. antarctica and found that the 2016 earthquake changed the diversity of the microbiome in disturbed, uplifted populations. Specifically, the analysis showed that disturbed bull kelp populations supported higher functional, taxonomic and phylogenetic microbial beta diversity than non-disturbed populations. It was hypothesised that this change was induced by the sudden decline in the host D. antarctica population following the earthquake.

==== Rarangi ====
The D. antarctica sampled from Rarangi, near Blenheim in Marlborough has been found to be genetically distinct from nearby geographic populations, and the kelp is most closely related to D. antarctica populations sampled over 300 km to the south on Banks Peninsula. Independently, based on LiDAR mapping and field observations, geologists have discovered a zone of uplifted rocky coastline at the same location. By combining the above genomic and geological evidence, researchers have hypothesised that a small section of coastline at Rarangi was uplifted by one of four major earthquakes between 6000 and 2000 years ago, which was sufficient in height and sudden enough to extirpate the original population of D. antarctica. Under this hypothesis, the present-day population was founded by rafts of kelp that were not related to the nearby geographic populations, leading the to current genetically distinct population present at Rarangi.

==== Wellington and the Wairarapa ====
Based on genetic data, the predominantly southern-restricted species D. poha appears to have undergone a recent range expansion into the North Island, as it can be found at low frequencies along the Wellington coastline. This range expansion coincides with areas affected by tectonic uplift and landslides caused by historic earthquakes, including the 1855 Wairarapa earthquake. The removal of D. antarctica and formation of new coastline by such tectonic disturbance likely provided an ecological opportunity for D. poha to successfully colonise coastline north of the Cook Strait.

A genetic study of D. antarctica identified distinct units of population structure across the uplift zone of the 1855 Wairarapa earthquake. Notably, two spatial-genomic sectors of D. antarctica were identified on Turakirae Head, which received the greatest degree of uplift (2 – 6 m). Phylogeographic modelling indicated that bull kelp that survived moderate uplift in the Wellington region (≤2 m) likely recolonised Turakirae Head via two parallel, eastward colonisation events - resulting in the two observed units of population structure. The hierarchical phylogeographic variation observed in the study provided non-experimental evidence of parapatric sectoring (see Founder takes all) as a result of natural disturbance, over a timescale observable to humans (i.e. <200 years).

It has been hypothesised that gaps in the current geographic range of D. willana around Wellington and the Wairarapa may have been caused by local extinction following historic earthquake uplift events such as the 1855 Wairarapa earthquake. However, uplift along the Akatore fault zone does not appear to have significantly affected the genetic diversity of D. willana in that region. The interpretation of this genetic result for Akatore was that earthquake uplift is likely insufficient to cause the complete extirpation of subtidal kelp species such as D. willana.

Earthquake uplift and Durvillaea
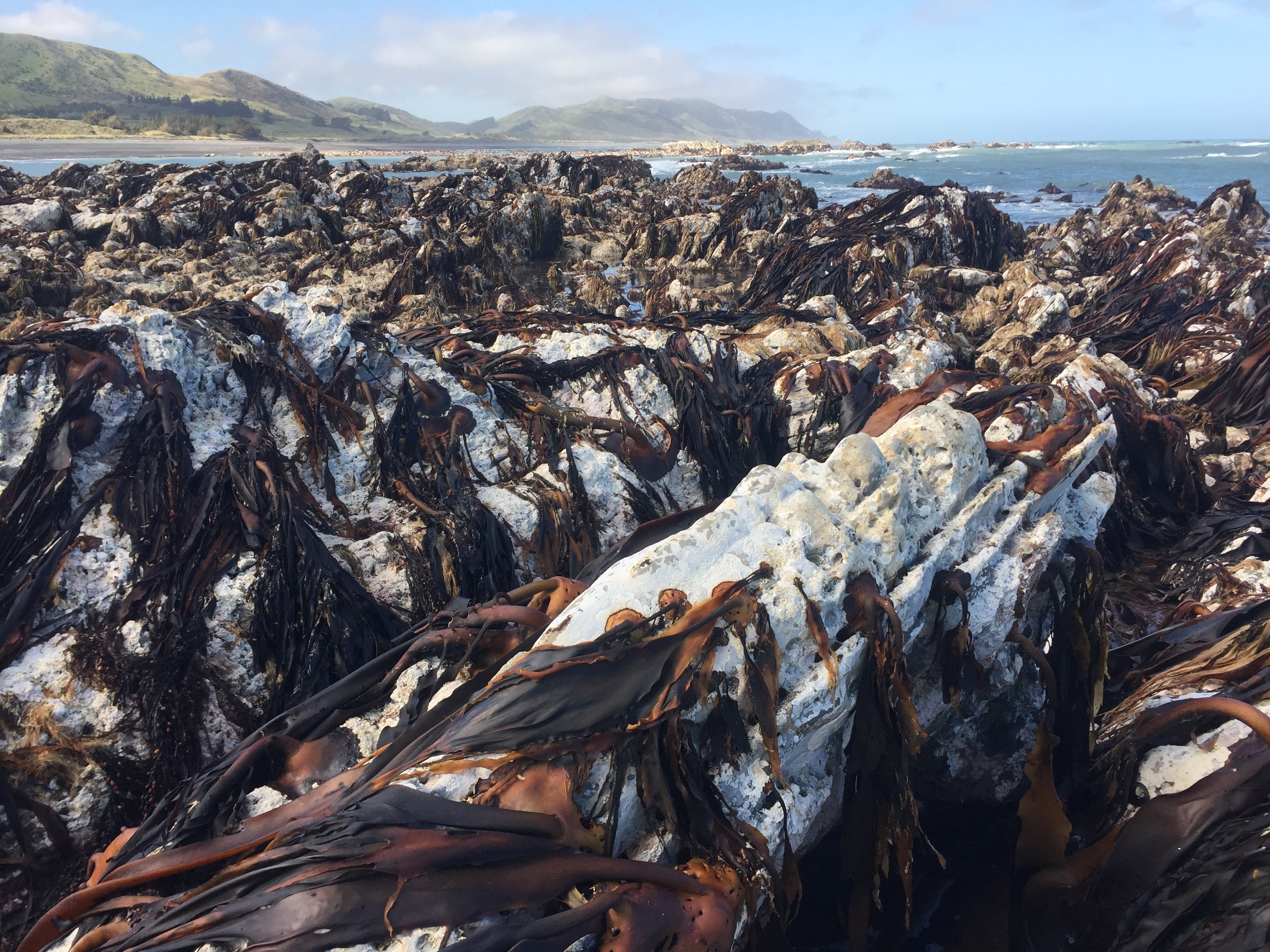
A die off of exposed Durvillaea kelp following uplift caused by the 2016 Kaikoura earthquake

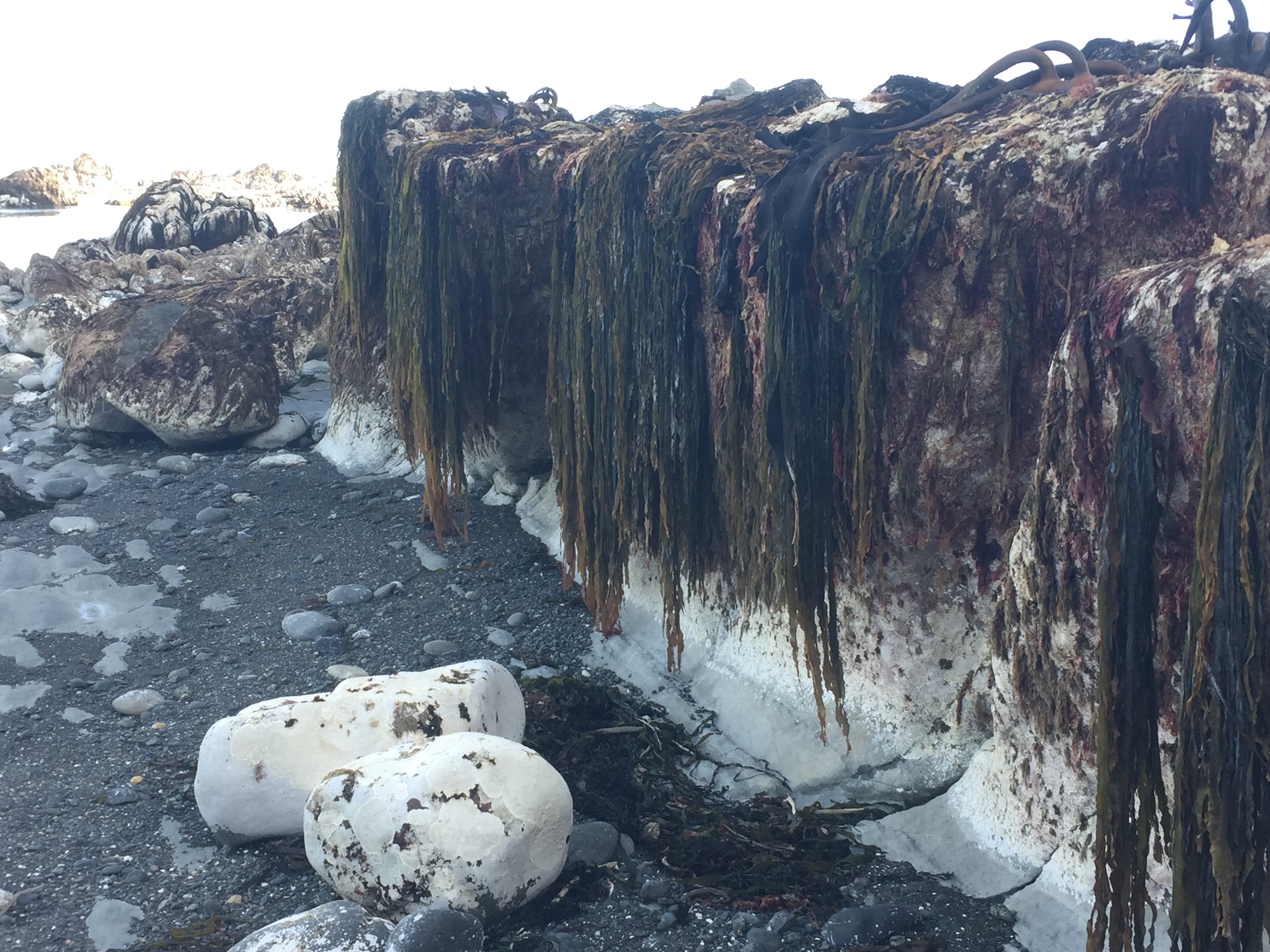
Durvillaea kelp and other seaweeds exposed by earthquake uplift at Kaikoura

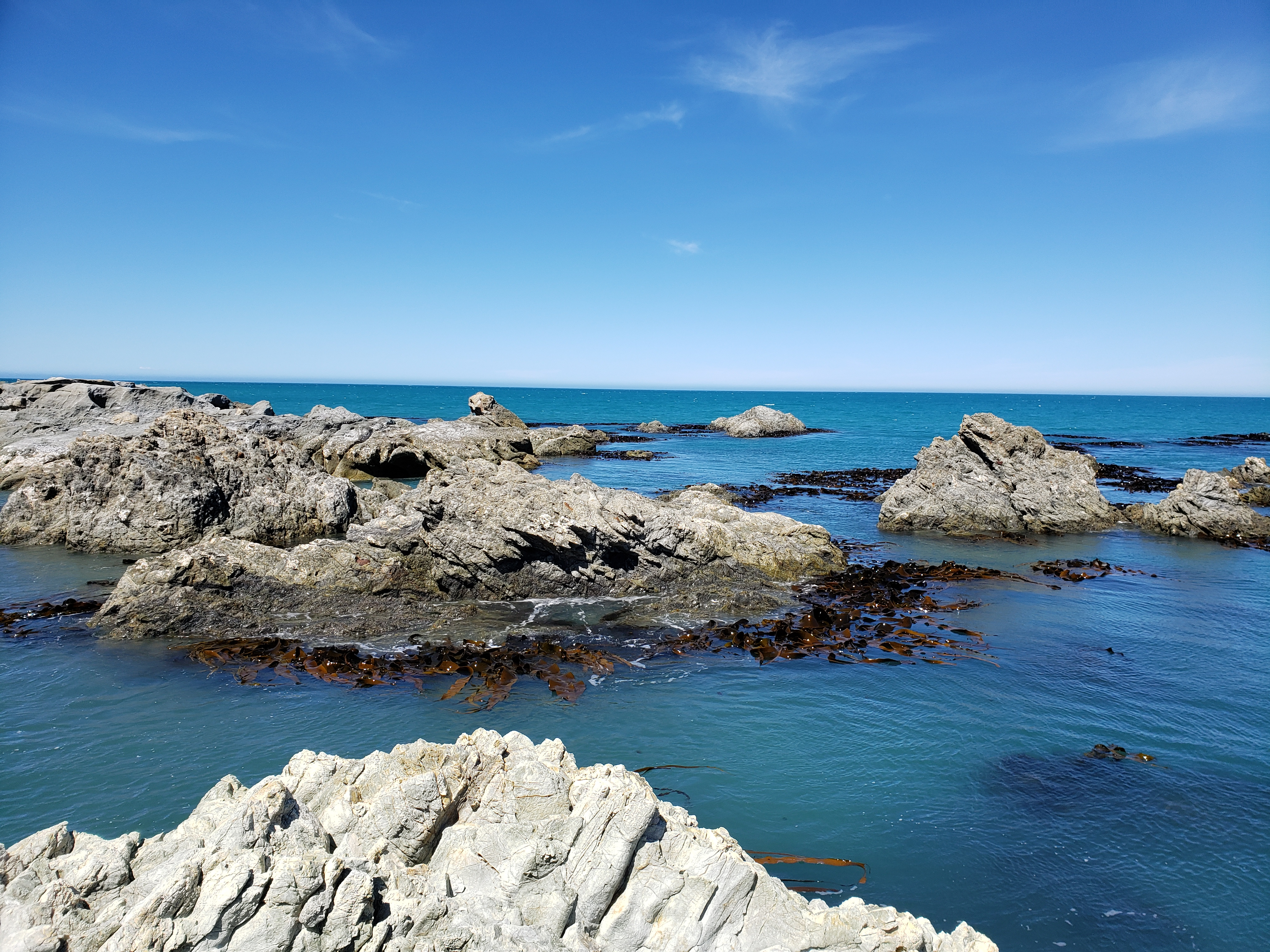
Uplifted shoreline at Ward Beach (photographed in 2020), with D. antarctica growing in the new intertidal zone

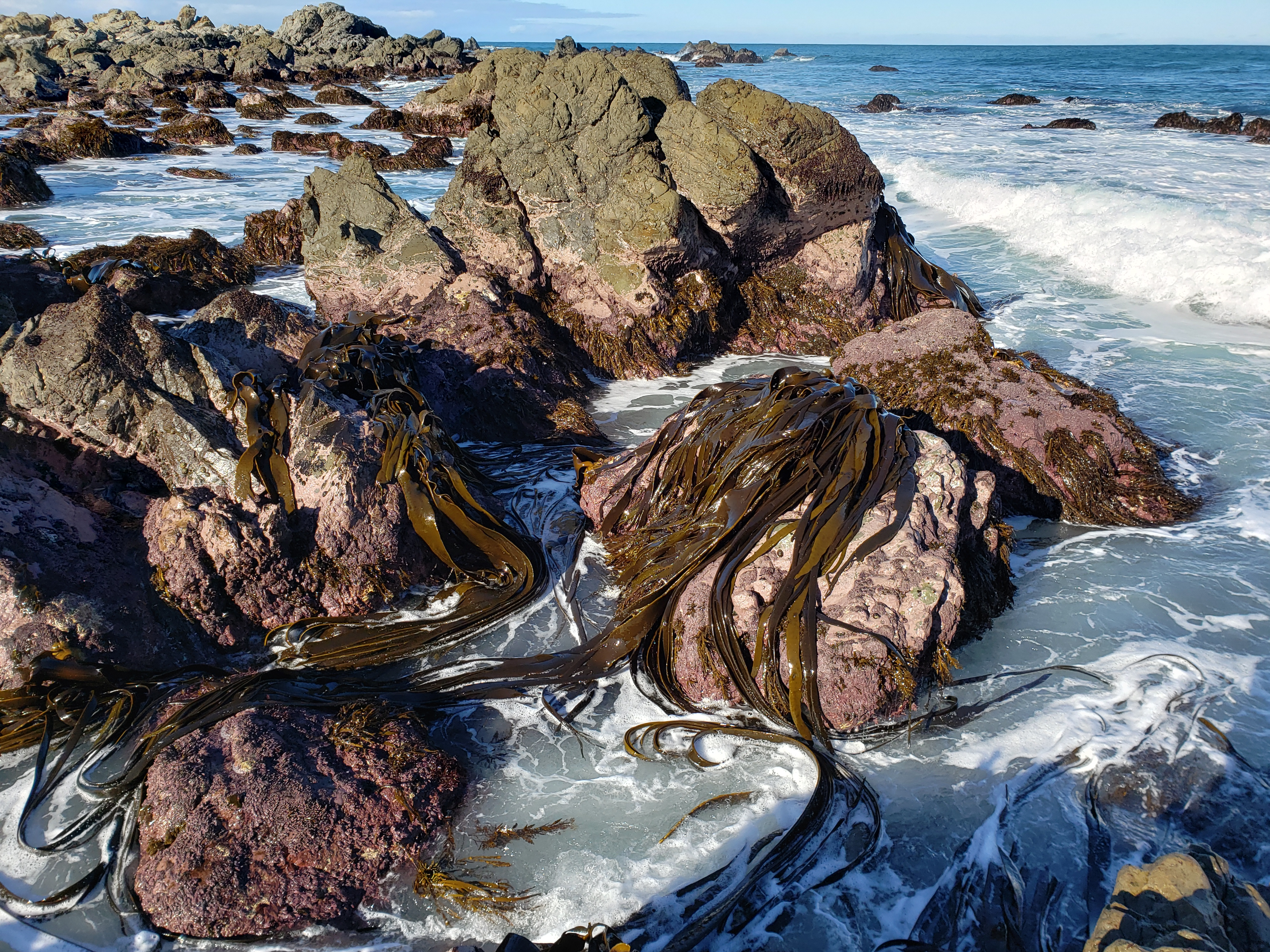
D. antarctica on Turakirae Head, with the raised beach in the background

== Species and distribution ==
There are currently eight recognised species within the genus, and the type species is D. antarctica. All species are restricted to the Southern Hemisphere and many taxa are endemic to particular coastlines or subantarctic islands.

- Durvillaea amatheiae X.A. Weber, G.J. Edgar, S.C. Banks, J.M. Waters & C.I. Fraser, 2017, endemic to southeast Australia.
- Durvillaea antarctica (Chamisso) Hariot, found in New Zealand, Chile and various subantarctic islands including Macquarie Island.
- Durvillaea chathamensis C.H.Hay, 1979, endemic to the Chatham Islands.
- Durvillaea fenestrata C. Hay, 2019, endemic in the subantarctic Antipodes Islands.
- Durvillaea incurvata (Suhr) Macaya, endemic to Chile.
- Durvillaea poha C.I. Fraser, H.G. Spencer & J.M. Waters, 2012, endemic to South Island of New Zealand, as well as the subantarctic Snares and Auckland Islands.
- Durvillaea potatorum (Labillardière) Areschoug, endemic to southeast Australia.
- Durvillaea willana Lindauer, 1949, endemic to New Zealand.

== Evolution ==
Time-calibrated phylogenetic trees using mixtures of mitochondrial and nuclear DNA markers have estimated that Durvillaea diverged from other brown algae approximately 20 to 60 million years ago. Given the modern distribution of extant Durvillaea species throughout the Southern Ocean, it has been suggested that the distribution may reflect vicariance following the break-up of Gondwana 40 to 50 million years ago, but this distribution can also be explained by the long-distance dispersal of buoyant Durvillaea lineages throughout the Southern Ocean. Based on molecular phylogenetic research, non-buoyancy is not necessarily the ancestral state for the genus, and non-buoyant lineages could have still been transported across the ocean when attached to rafts of different species of buoyant algae.

A phylogeny focused on the genus, based on four genes (COI, rbcL, 28S and 18S) indicates the evolutionary relationships shown in the cladogram below. Notably, additional unclassified lineages were estimated within D. antarctica. Mitochondrial introgression has been observed between two species, where some individuals with nuclear DNA of D. poha exhibited mitochondrial DNA belonging to D. antarctica.

Cladogram of Durvillaea

- - - - - - D. willana
      - - - D. potatorum
        - - D. amatheiae
  - - - - D. fenestrata
    - - - - D. incurvata
      - - - - D. poha
        - - - - D. chathamensis
              - D. antarctica (New Zealand north)
          - - - D. antarctica (New Zealand south)
            - - D. antarctica (Subantarctic and Chile)

== Use of Durvillaea species ==
=== Australia ===
D. potatorum was used extensively for clothing and tools by Aboriginal Tasmanians, with uses including material for shoes and bags to transport freshwater and food. Currently, D. potatorum is collected as beach wrack from King Island, where it is then dried as chips and sent to Scotland for phycocolloid extraction.

=== Chile ===
D. antarctica and D. incurvata have been used in Chilean cuisine for salads and stews, predominantly by the Mapuche indigenous people who refer to it as collofe or kollof. The same species is also called cochayuyo (cocha: lake, and yuyo: weed), and hulte in Quechua. The kelp harvest, complemented with shellfish gathering, supports artisanal fishing communities in Chile. Exclusive harvest rights are designated using coves or caletas, and the income for fishers (and their unions) often depends upon the sale of cochayuyo.

=== New Zealand ===
Maori use D. antarctica (rimurapa) and D. poha to make traditional pōhā bags, which are used to transport food and fresh water, to propagate live shellfish, and to make clothing and equipment for sports. Pōhā are especially associated with Ngāi Tahu and are often used to carry and store muttonbird (tītī) chicks. The Ngāi Tahu Claims Settlement Act 1998 protects Durvillaea bull kelp from commercial harvesting within the tribe's traditional seaweed-gathering areas.

People living in coastal Otago and Southland have also traditionally carved bouncing balls, including cricket balls, out of the solid stipes of Durvillaea.

Uses of southern bull kelp
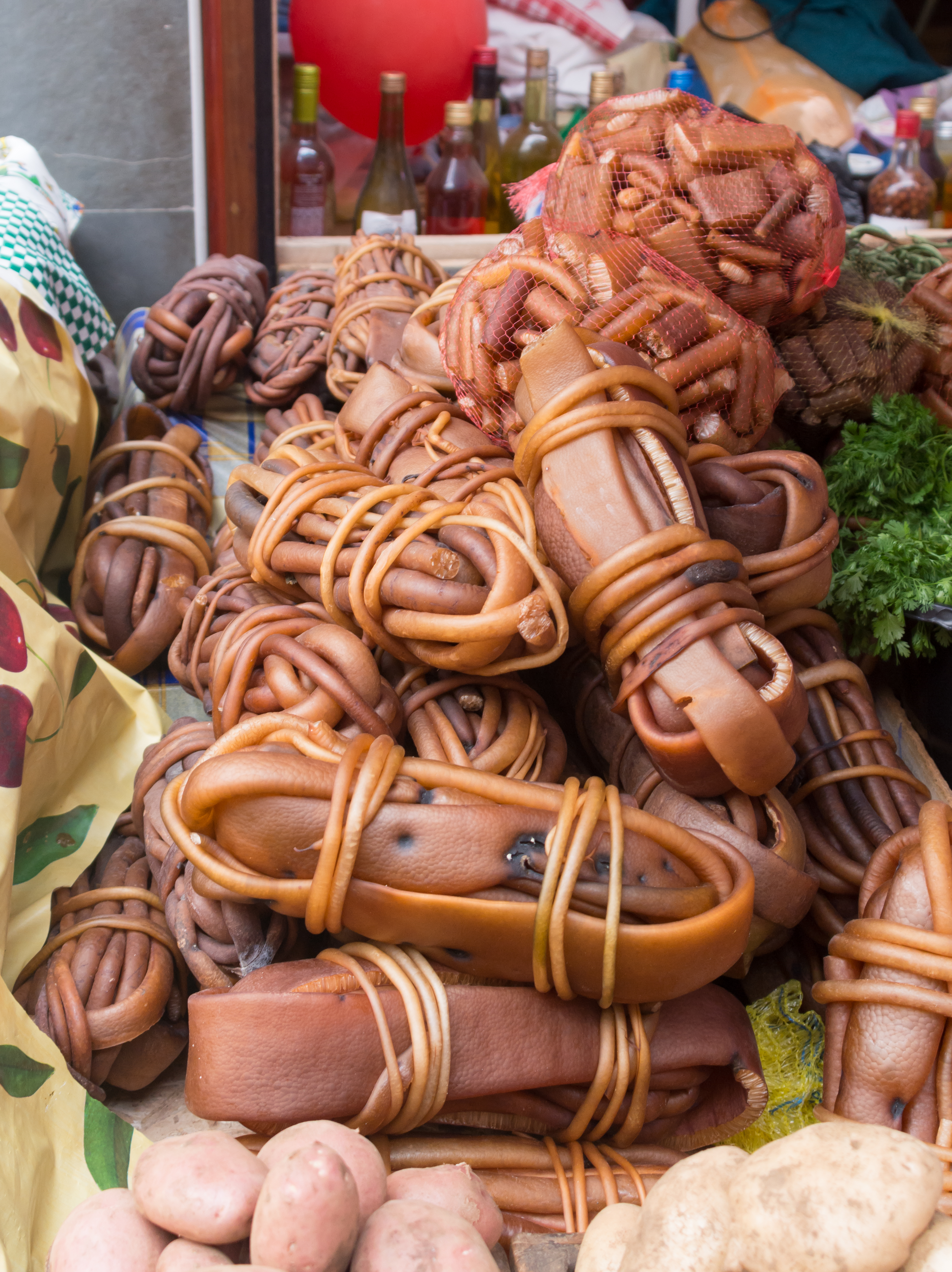
Cochayuyo (D. antarctica) for sale in Chile

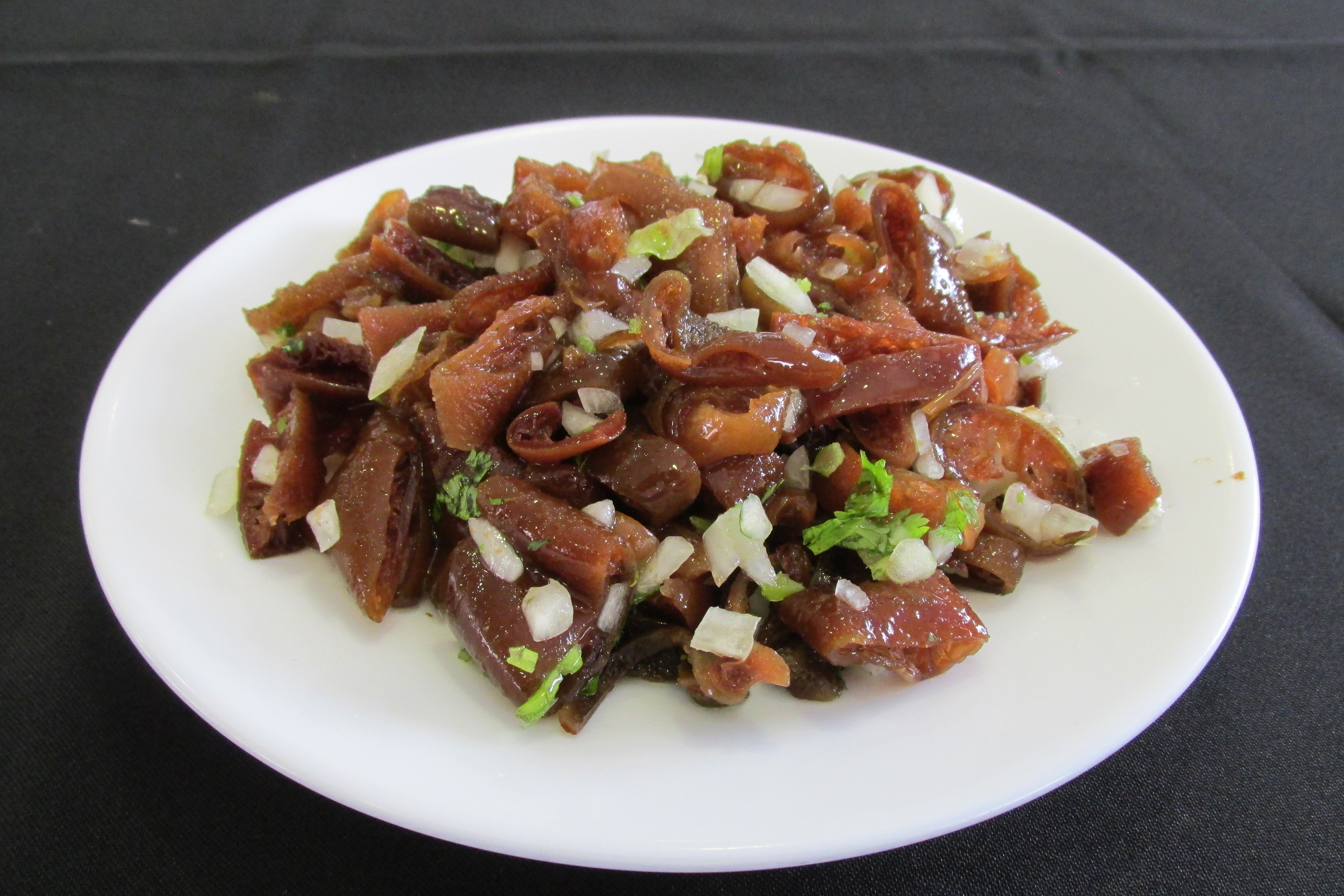
Cochayuyo salad

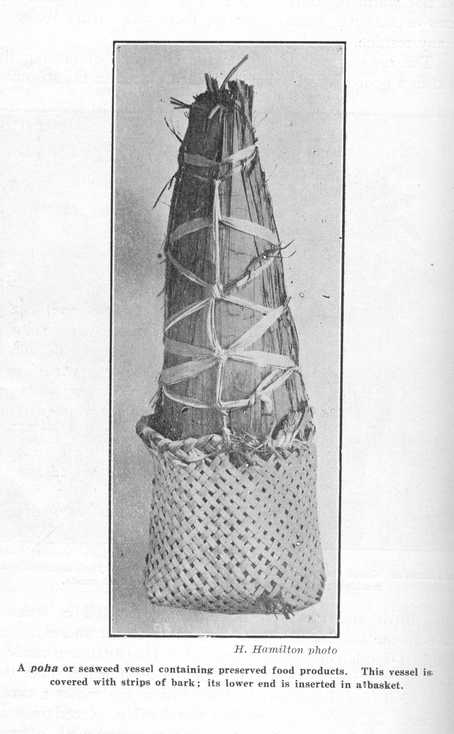
A pōhā, a bag made from Durvillaea covered with totara bark and inserted into a flax basket
