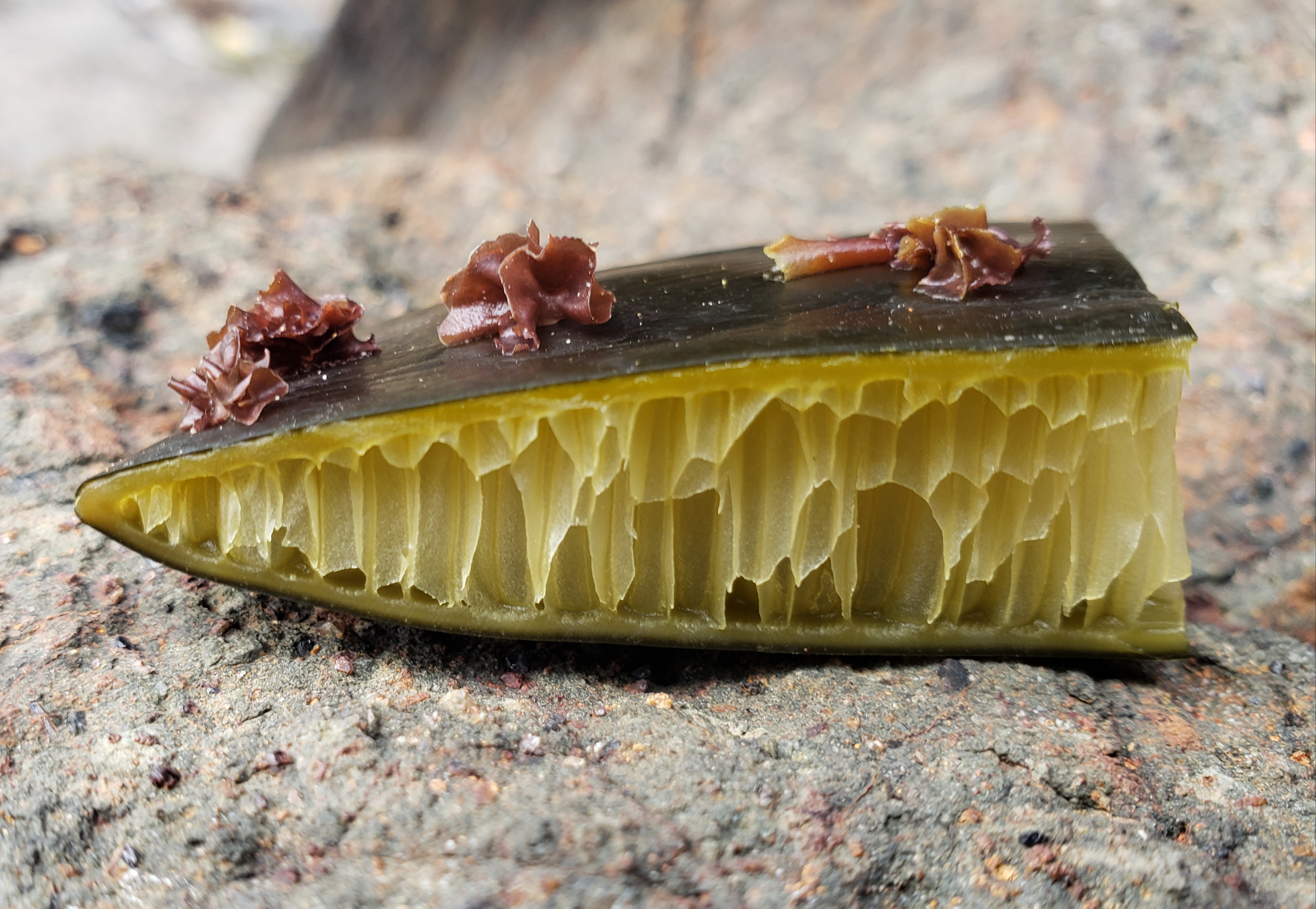
- Cross-section of a Durvillaea antarctica frond, showing Pyrophyllon subtumens growing on the outer surface

Scientific classification
- Domain: Eukaryota
- Clade: Archaeplastida
- Division: Rhodophyta
- Class: Compsopogonophyceae
- Order: Erythropeltidales
- Family: Erythrotrichiaceae
- Genus: Pyrophyllon
- Species: P. subtumens

Binomial name
- Pyrophyllon subtumens (J. Agardh ex R.M. Laing) W.A. Nelson 2003

= Pyrophyllon subtumens =

Species of alga

Pyrophyllon subtumens is an obligate red algal epiphyte of Durvillaea southern bull-kelp, and is endemic to New Zealand.

== Taxonomy ==
The species belongs to a monotypic genus, which is sister to Childophyllon - a genus containing another red algal epiphyte of other seaweeds in New Zealand. The species was previously recognised as Porphyra subtumens before being reclassified.

== Description ==
The species can be found growing on all mainland New Zealand species of Durvillaea.

Images of Pyrophyllon subtumens
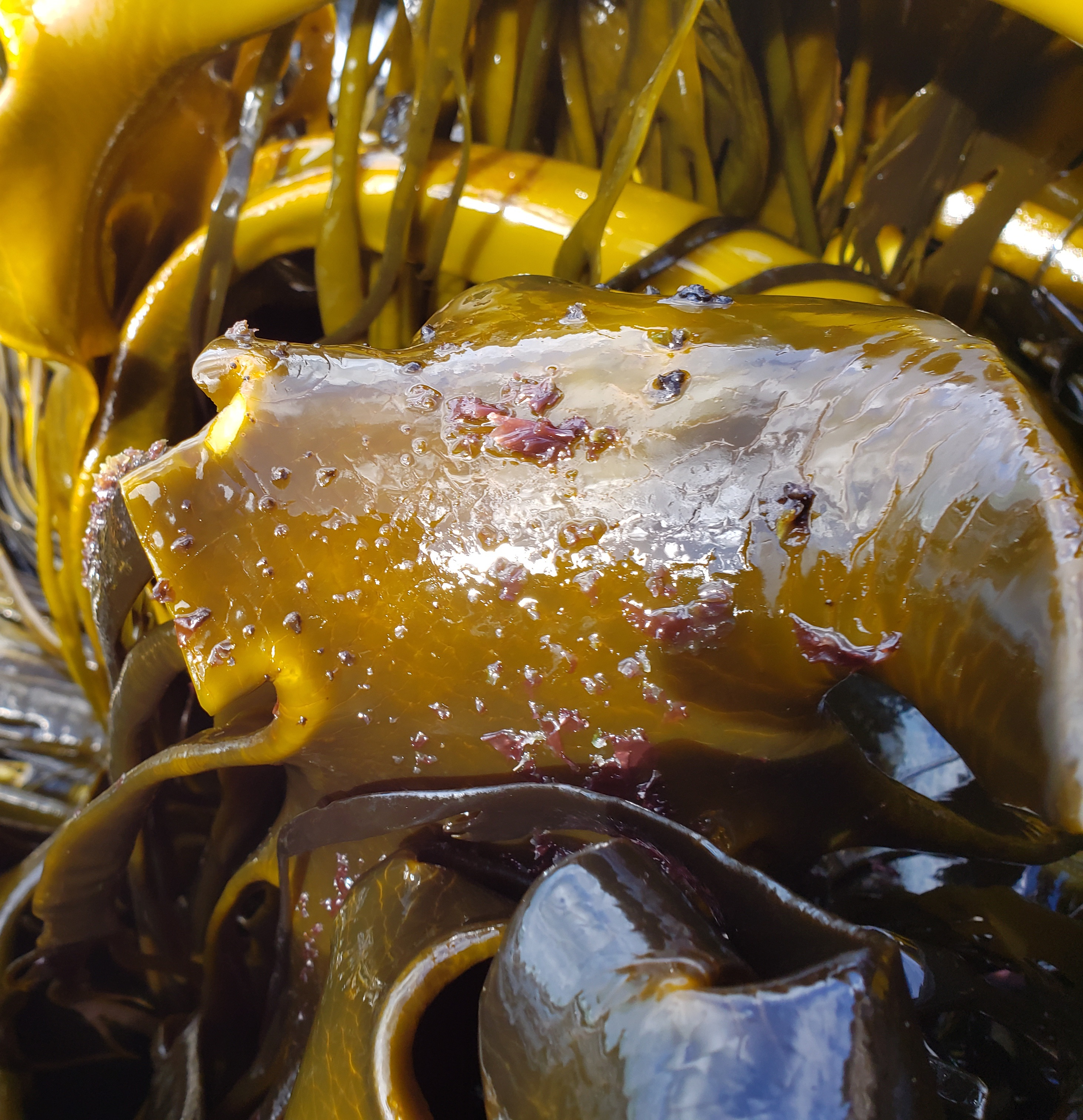
Growing D. antarctica at Allans Beach, Otago

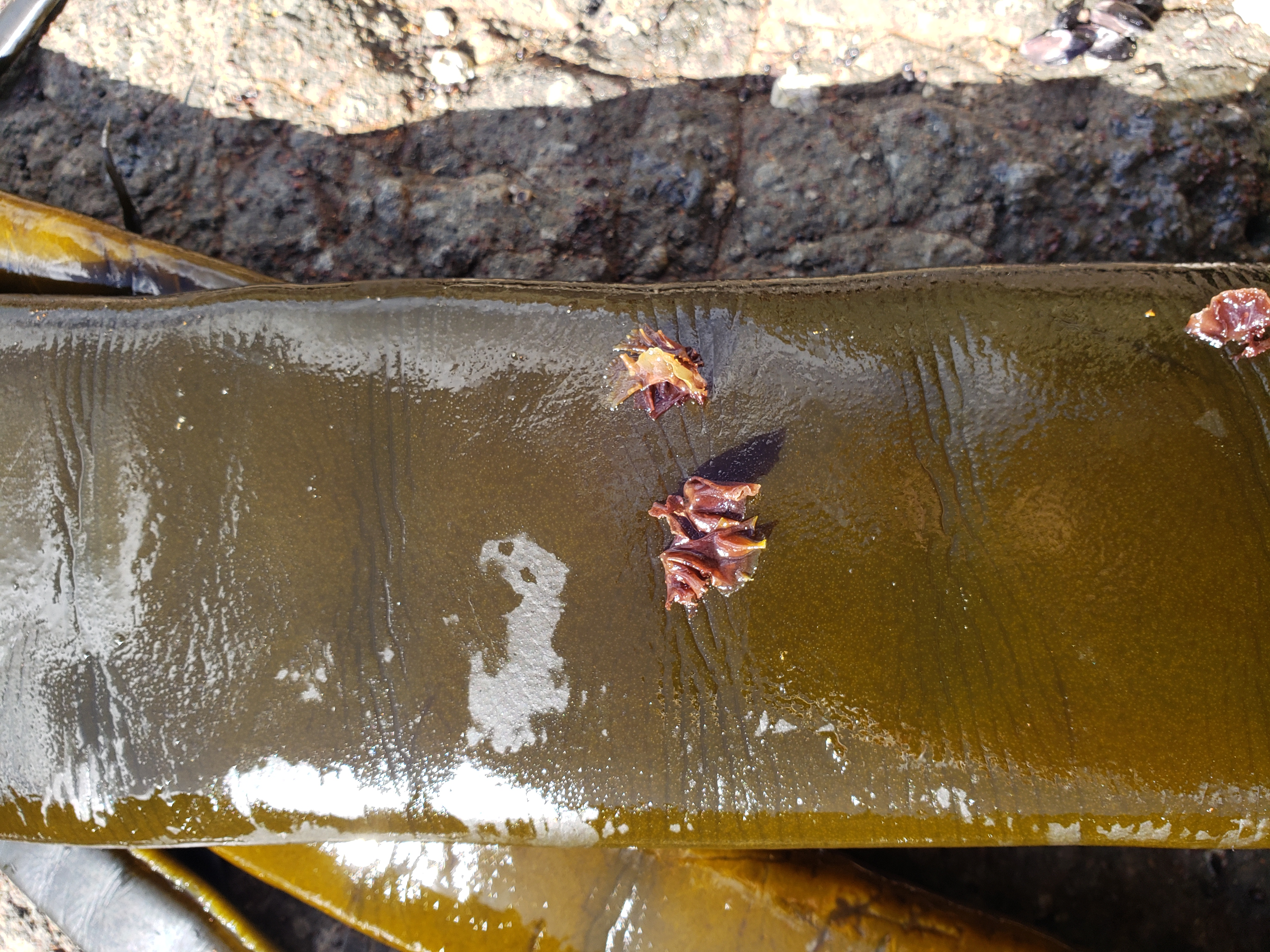
Growing D. antarctica at Allans Beach, Otago

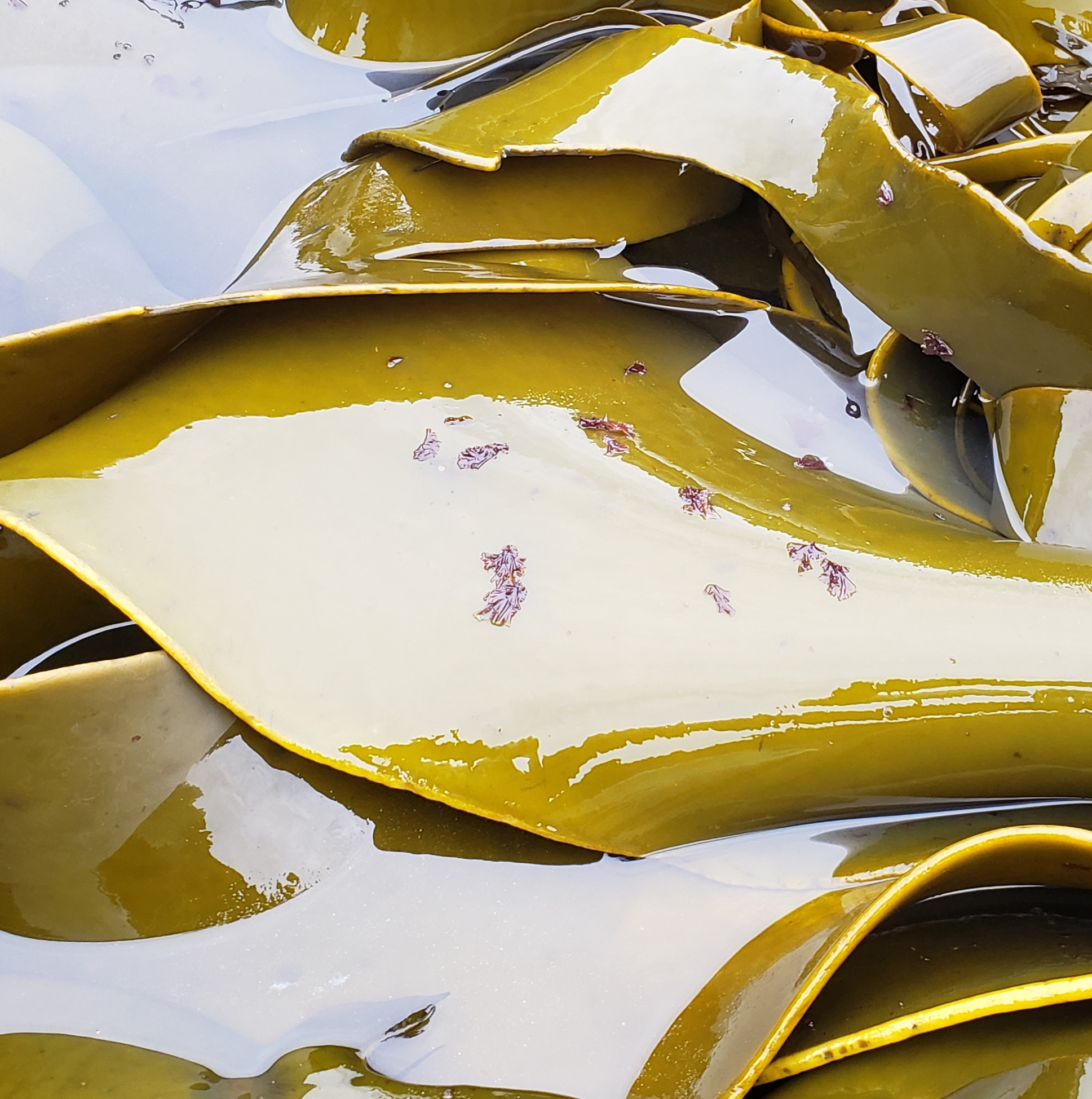
Growing D. poha at Akatore Beach, Otago

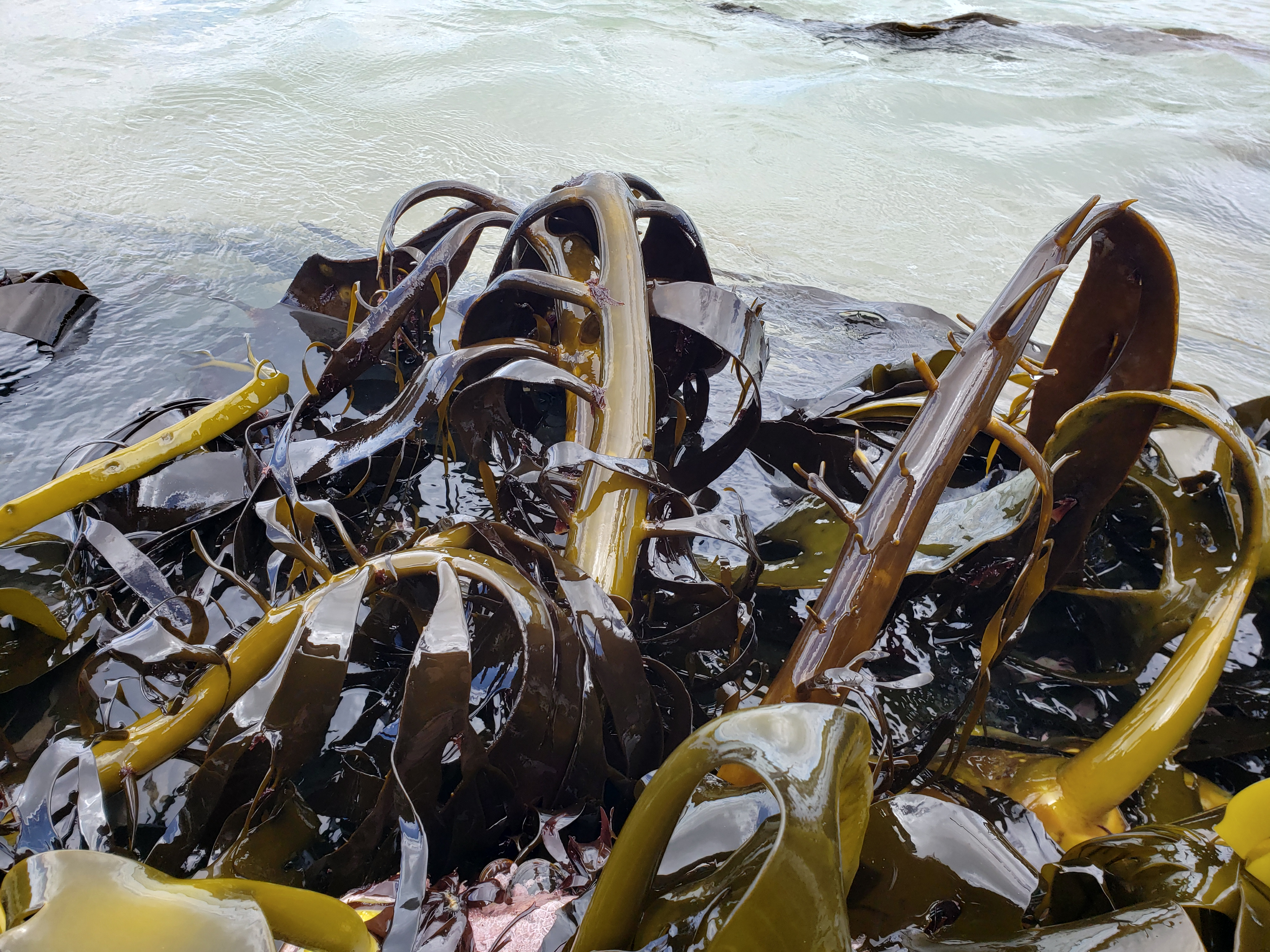
Growing D. willana (centre left plant) at Watsons Beach, Otago
