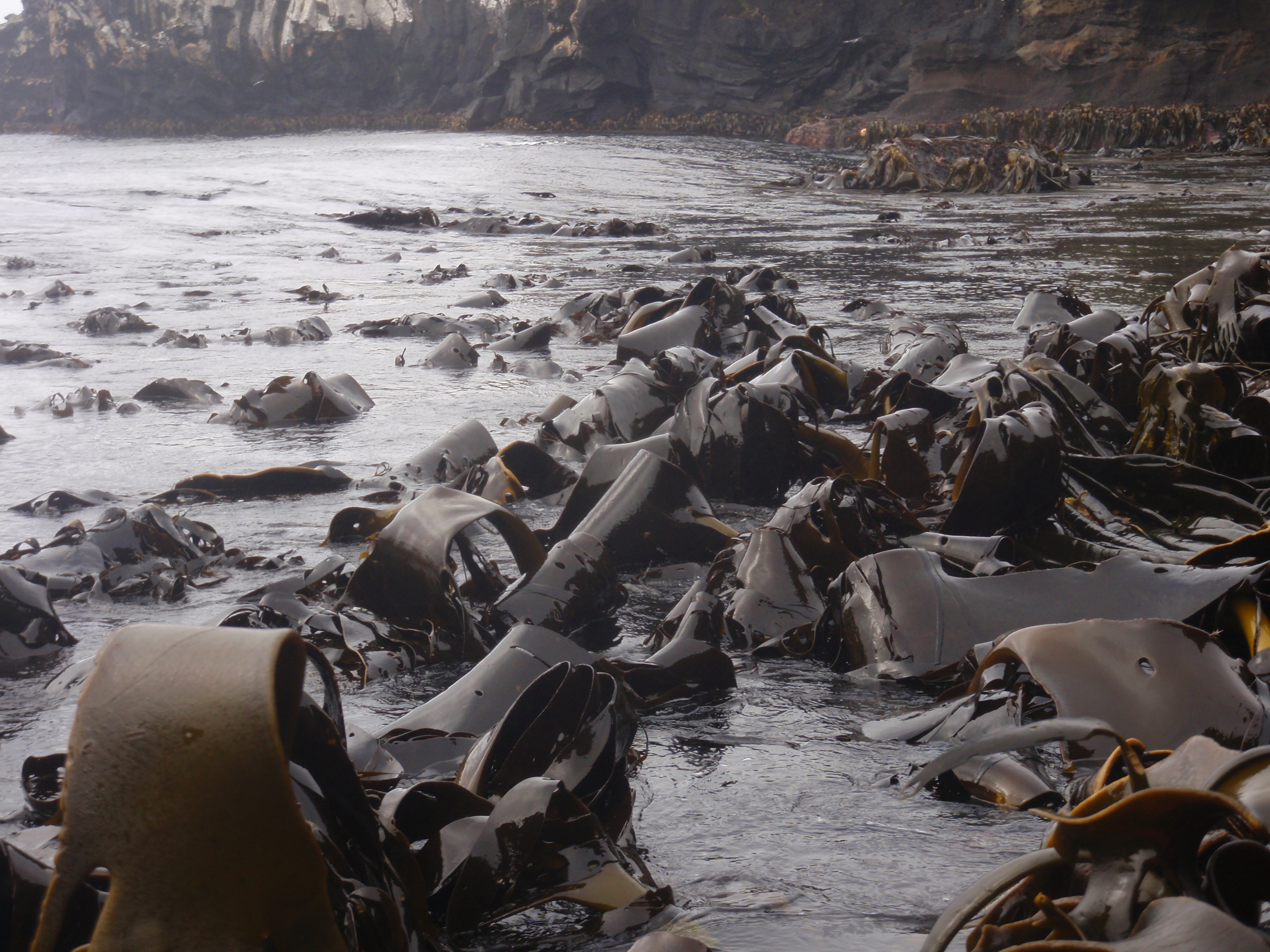
- Durvillaea fenestrata kelp in the Antipodes Islands

Scientific classification
- Domain: Eukaryota
- Clade: Diaphoretickes
- Clade: SAR
- Clade: Stramenopiles
- Phylum: Gyrista
- Subphylum: Ochrophytina
- Class: Phaeophyceae
- Order: Fucales
- Family: Durvillaeaceae
- Genus: Durvillaea
- Species: D. fenestrata

Binomial name
- Durvillaea fenestrata C. Hay, 2019

= Durvillaea fenestrata =

Species of seaweed

Durvillaea fenestrata is a large, robust species of southern bull kelp endemic to the subantarctic Antipodes Islands of New Zealand.

== Description ==
Durvillaea fenestrata has unbranched stipes, and many holes occur on the primary and secondary blades.

== Distribution ==
Durvillaea fenestrata is endemic to the subantarctic Antipodes Islands of New Zealand.
