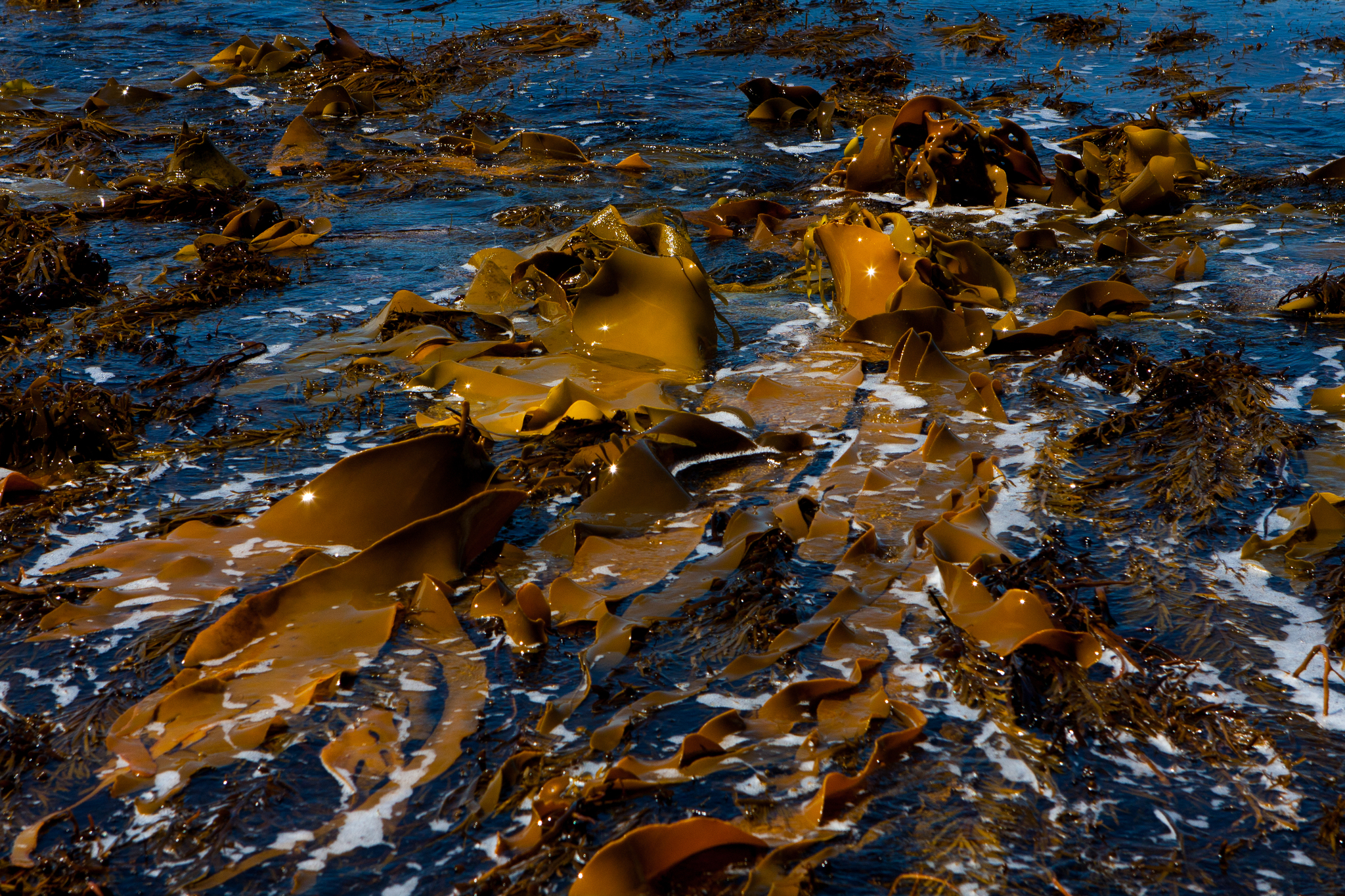
- Durvillaea potatorum off Eaglehawk Neck, Australia

Scientific classification
- Domain: Eukaryota
- Clade: Sar
- Clade: Stramenopiles
- Division: Ochrophyta
- Class: Phaeophyceae
- Order: Fucales
- Family: Durvillaeaceae
- Genus: Durvillaea
- Species: D. potatorum

Binomial name
- Durvillaea potatorum (Labillardière) Areschoug

= Durvillaea potatorum =

Species of seaweed

Durvillaea potatorum is a large, robust species of southern bull kelp found in Australia.

== Description ==
The species can be confused with Durvillaea amatheiae, which has an overlapping geographic distribution. D. potatorum has a shorter, wider stipe with more limited lateral blade development, whereas D. amatheiae has a shorter, narrow stipe and typically prolific lateral blade development.

== Distribution ==
Durvillaea potatorum is endemic to southeast Australia.

== Uses ==
Durvillaea potatorum was used extensively for clothing and tools by Aboriginal Tasmanians, with uses including material for shoes and bags to transport freshwater and food. The Aboriginal Peoples of Tasmania continue to collect and use bull kelp for cultural purposes; it is a cultural keystone species. Currently, D. potatorum is collected as beach wrack from King Island, where it is then dried as chips and sent to Scotland for phycocolloid extraction.
