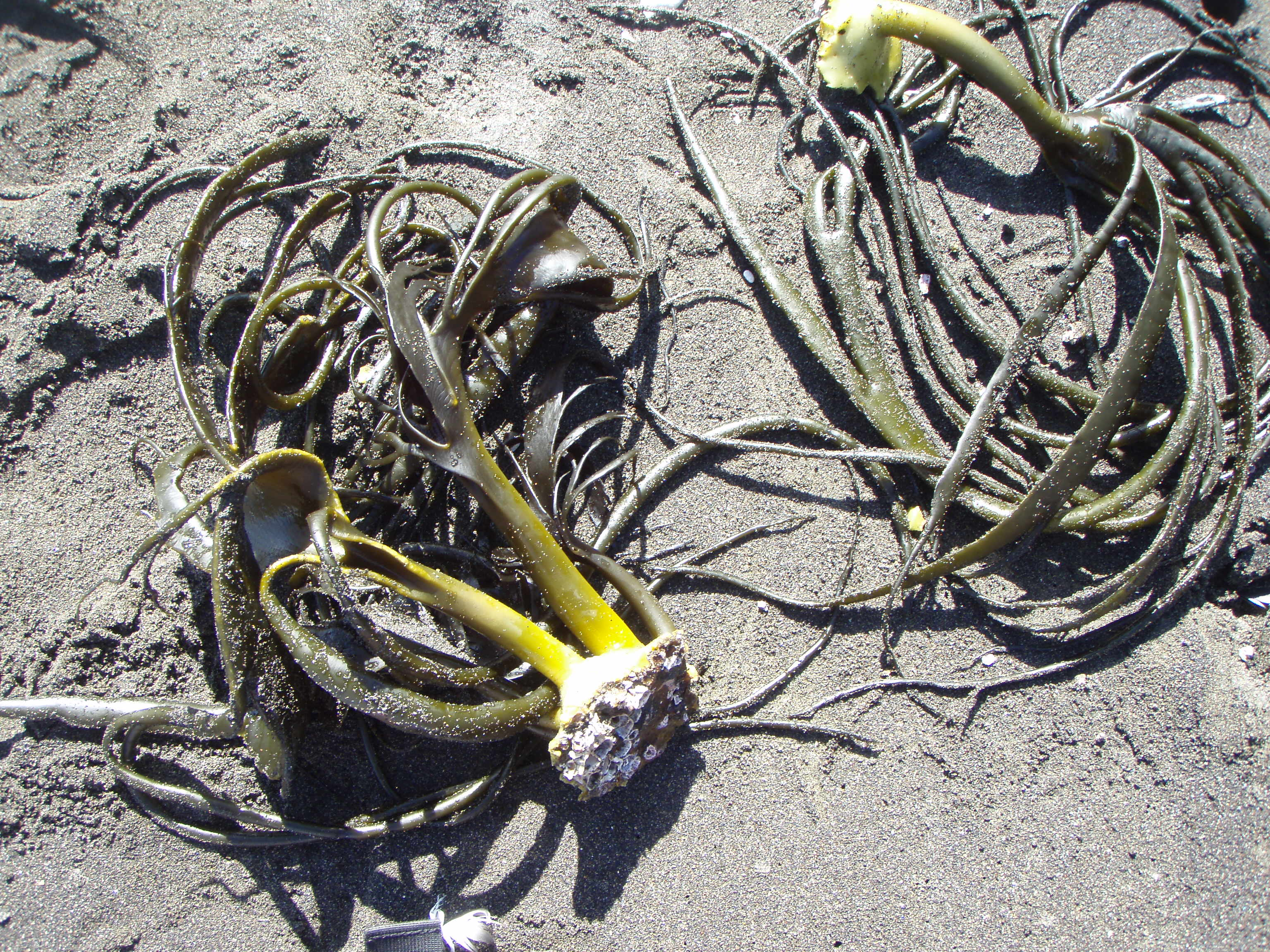
- Durvillaea incurvata washed up on a beach in Chile

Scientific classification
- Domain: Eukaryota
- Clade: Diaphoretickes
- Clade: SAR
- Clade: Stramenopiles
- Phylum: Gyrista
- Subphylum: Ochrophytina
- Class: Phaeophyceae
- Order: Fucales
- Family: Durvillaeaceae
- Genus: Durvillaea
- Species: D. incurvata

Binomial name
- Durvillaea incurvata (Suhr) Macaya

= Durvillaea incurvata =

Species of seaweed

Durvillaea incurvata is a large, robust species of southern bull kelp endemic to Chile.

== Description ==
Durvillaea incurvata has unbranched stipes, and many holes occur on the primary and secondary blades.

== Distribution ==
Durvillaea fenestrata is endemic to Chile from the coasts of Coquimbo to Betecoi Island in Guaitecas Archipelago.

== Human use ==
Along with D. antarctica, D. incurvata is used in Chilean cuisine. The Mapuche call the species kollof and in Quechua the stipes are called ulte or huilte, and the blades are cochayuyo.
