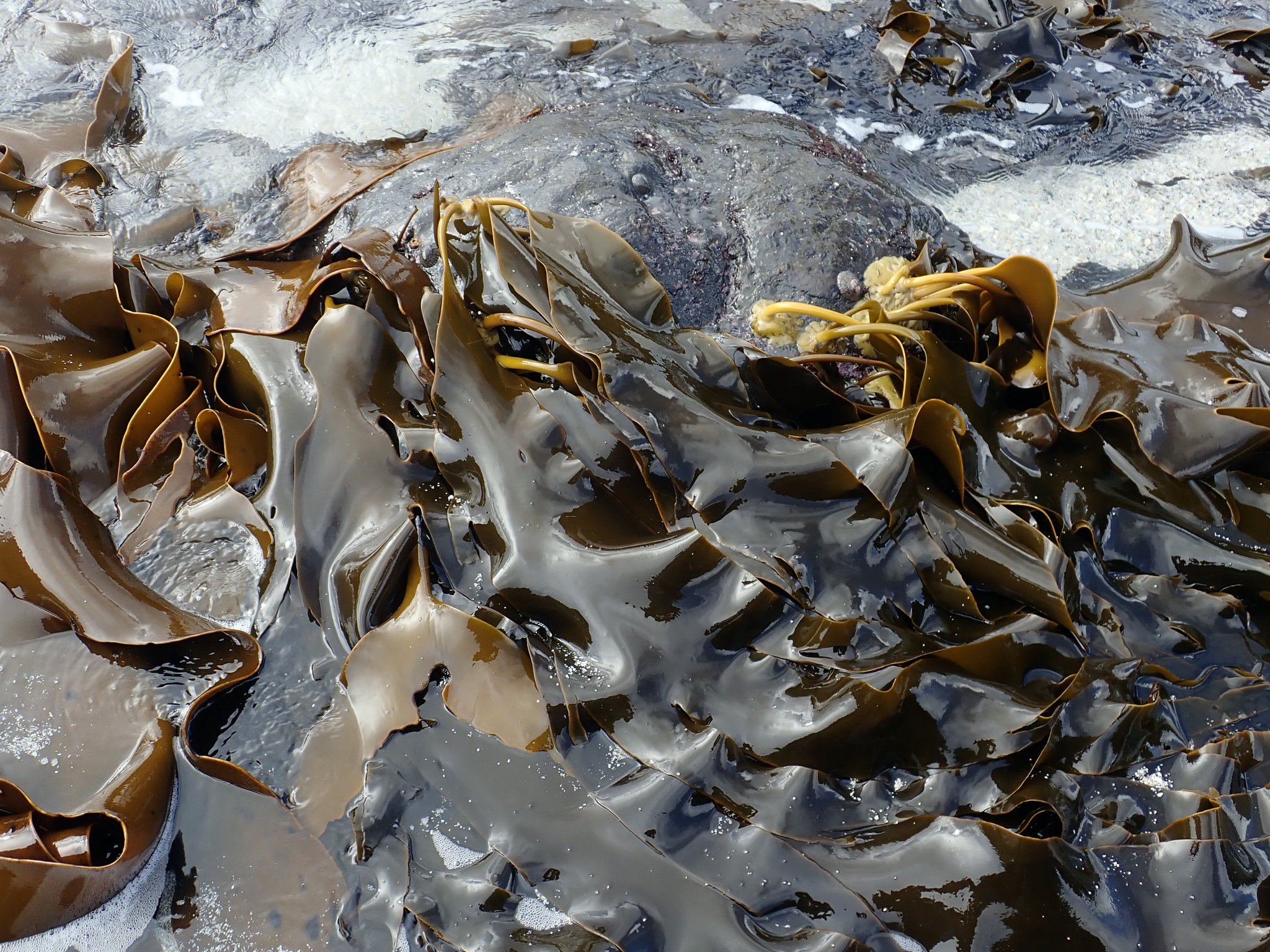
- Durvillaeae chathamensis at Wharekauri Beach, Chatham Island

Scientific classification
- Domain: Eukaryota
- Clade: Sar
- Clade: Stramenopiles
- Phylum: Ochrophyta
- Class: Phaeophyceae
- Order: Fucales
- Family: Durvillaeaceae
- Genus: Durvillaea
- Species: D. chathamensis

Binomial name
- Durvillaea chathamensis C.H.Hay, 1979

= Durvillaea chathamensis =

Species of seaweed

Durvillaea chathamensis is a large, robust species of southern bull kelp endemic to the Chatham Islands of New Zealand.

== Distribution ==
Durvillaea chathamensis is endemic to the Chatham Islands of New Zealand.

== Moriori culture ==
D. chathamensis was also used to create semi-submerged dingies called waka kōrari by Moriori.
