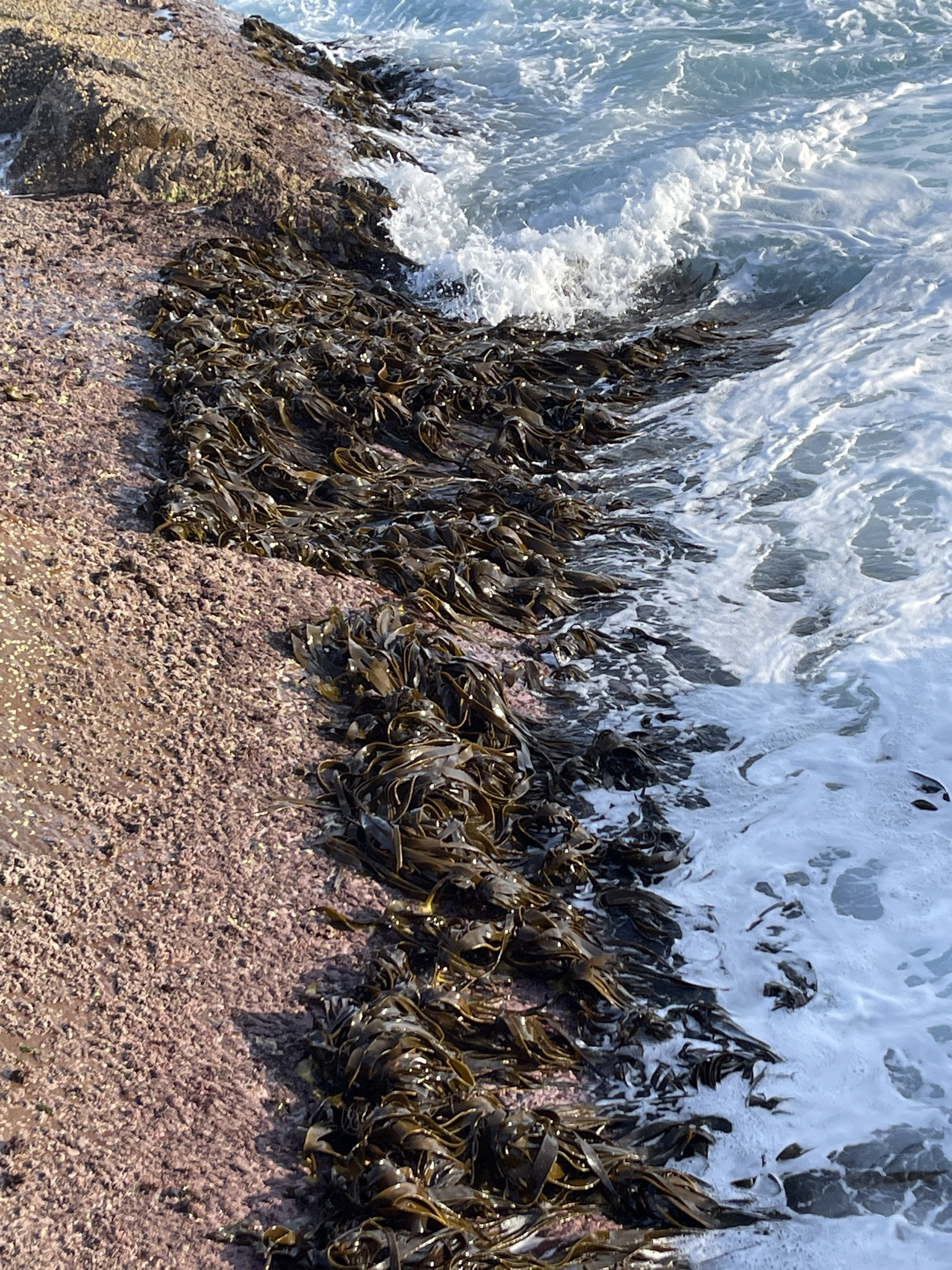

Scientific classification
- Domain: Eukaryota
- Clade: Diaphoretickes
- Clade: SAR
- Clade: Stramenopiles
- Phylum: Gyrista
- Subphylum: Ochrophytina
- Class: Phaeophyceae
- Order: Fucales
- Family: Durvillaeaceae
- Genus: Durvillaea
- Species: D. amatheiae

Binomial name
- Durvillaea amatheiae X.A. Weber, G.J. Edgar, S.C. Banks, J.M. Waters & C.I. Fraser, 2017

= Durvillaea amatheiae =

Species of seaweed

Durvillaea amatheiae is a large, robust species of southern bull kelp found in Australia.

== Description ==
The species can be confused with Durvillaea potatorum, which has an overlapping geographic distribution. D. potatorum has a shorter, wider stipe with more limited lateral blade development, whereas D. amatheiae has a shorter, narrow stipe and typically prolific lateral blade development.

== Distribution ==
Durvillaea amatheiae is endemic to southeast Australia.
