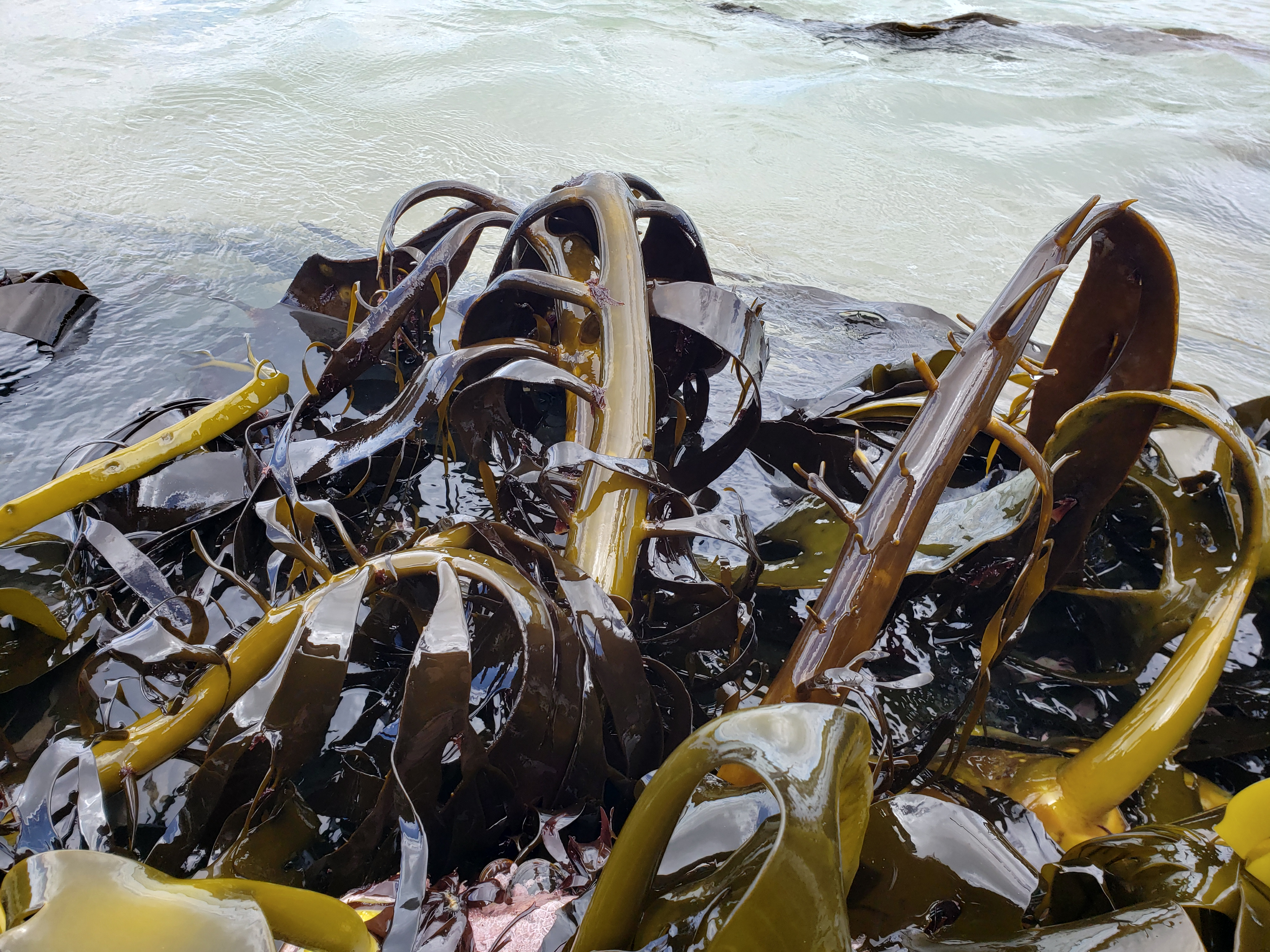
- D. willana at Watsons Beach, Otago, with the epiphyte Pyrophyllon subtumens growing on the middle plant .

Scientific classification
- Domain: Eukaryota
- Supergroup: Stramenopiles
- Division: Ochrophyta
- Class: Phaeophyceae
- Order: Fucales
- Family: Durvillaeaceae
- Genus: Durvillaea
- Species: D. willana

Binomial name
- Durvillaea willana Lindauer, 1949

= Durvillaea willana =

Species of seaweed

Durvillaea willana is a large species of southern bull kelp endemic to New Zealand. The specific epithet willana honours Eileen Alice Willa who collected many algal species for Lindauer.

== Description ==
This species is chocolate brown in colour and is darker than all other bull kelp species. The holdfast becomes large and spreads like a plate on rocky substrates. The species has a branched stipe, and is non-buoyant, lacking a honeycomb structure within its fronds.

This species is superficially similar in appearance to Durvillaea antarctica. However, D. willana has smaller blades than D. antarctica and is usually found lower on the shoreline because its lower tolerance of wave action compared to D. antarctica. D. antarctica is also buoyant, possessing a honeycomb structure, though does not branch.

Images of Durvillaea willana
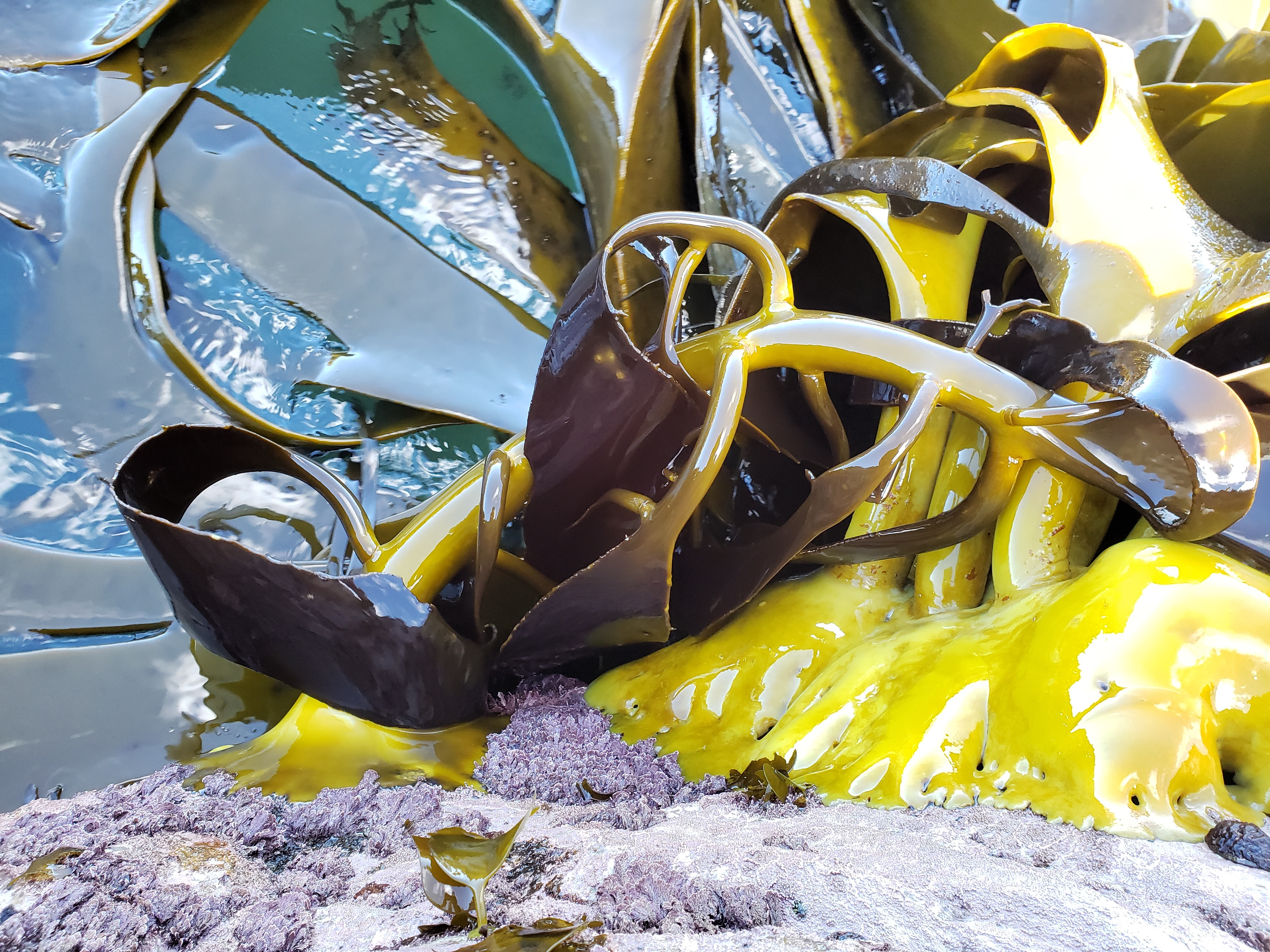
D. willana growing on Taieri Island, showing the distinctive branched stipe and dark colouration

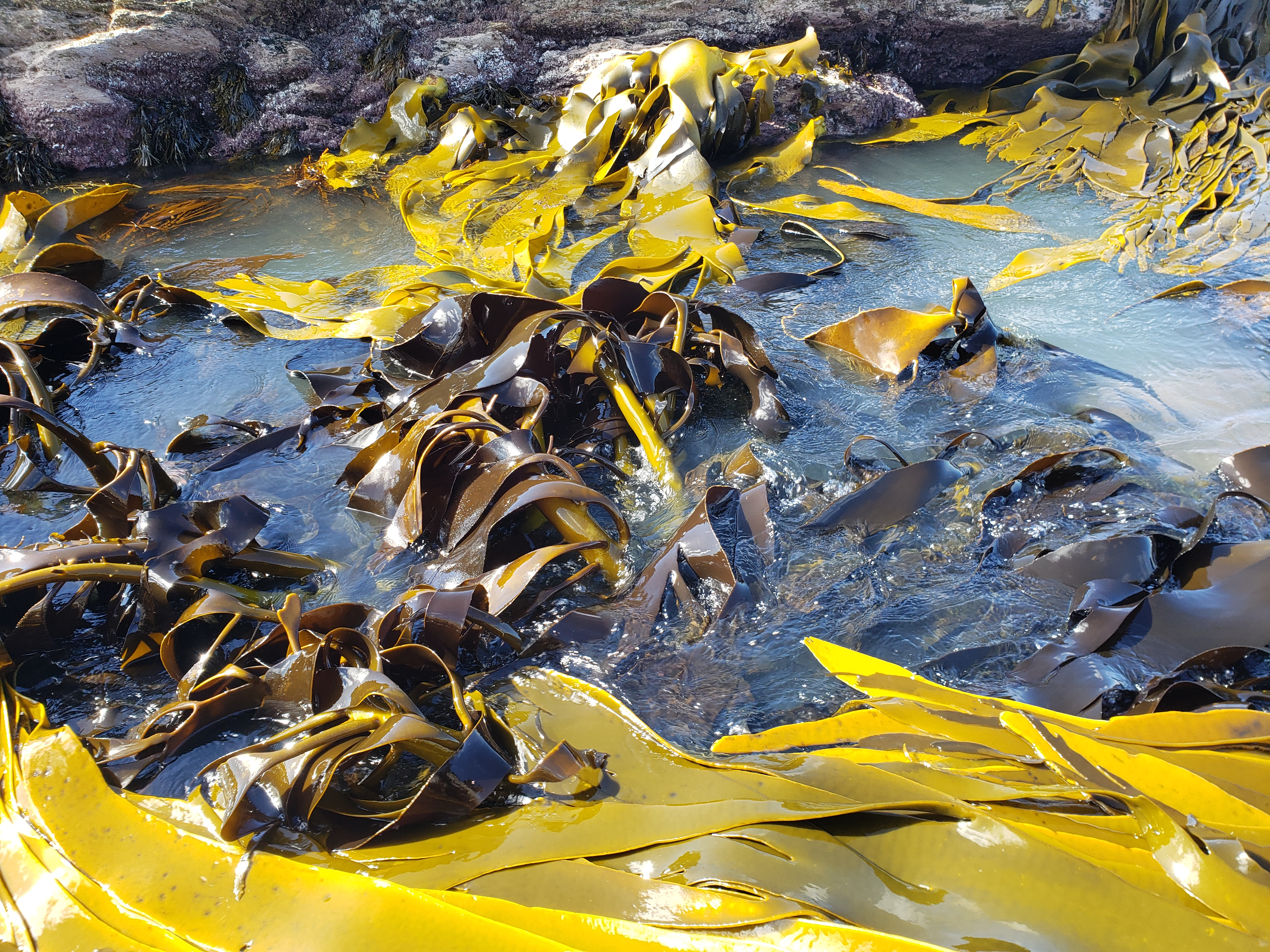
D. willana surrounded by other Durvillaea on Taieri Island, Otago

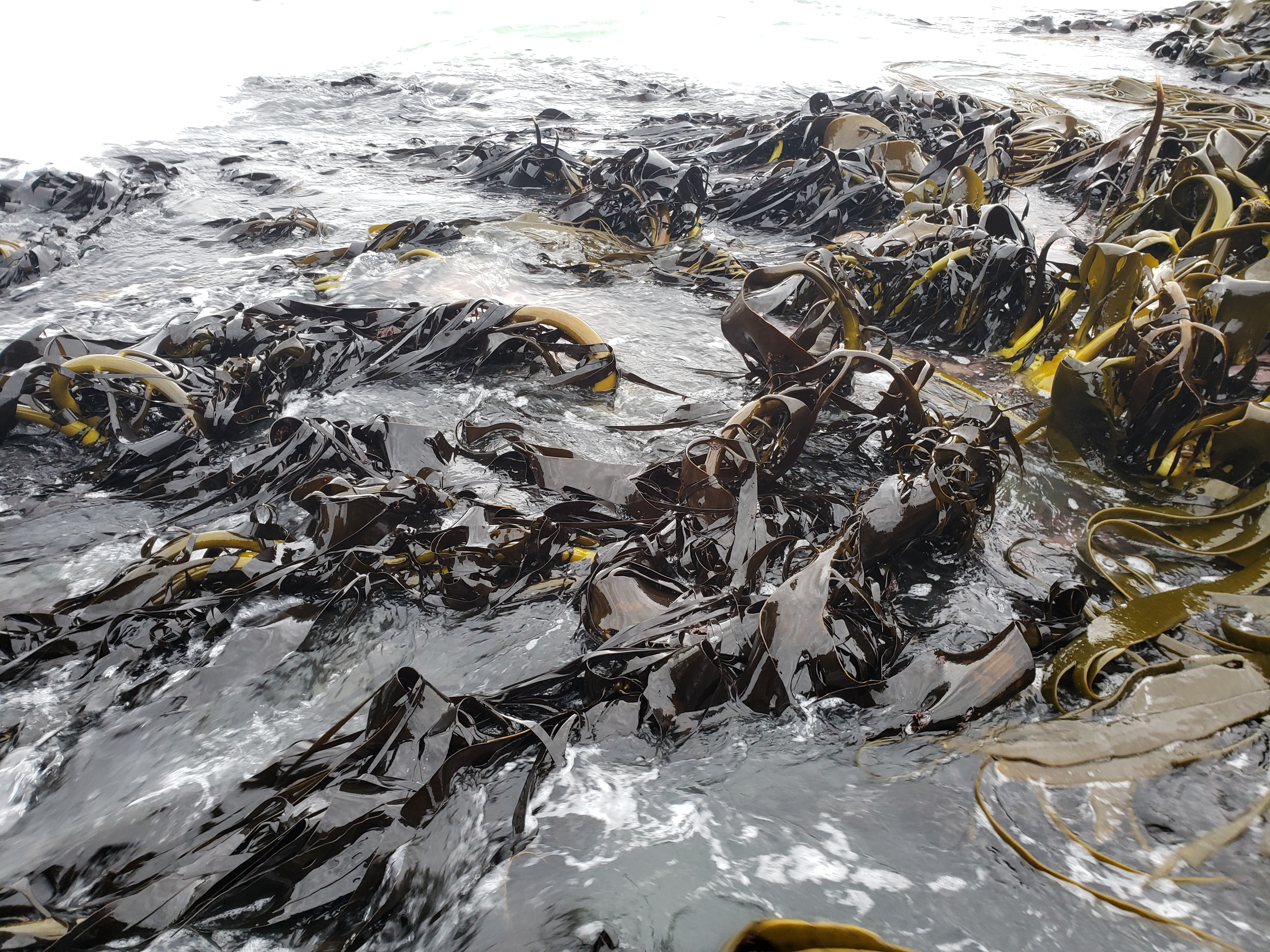
Many D. willana growing at Watsons Beach, Otago

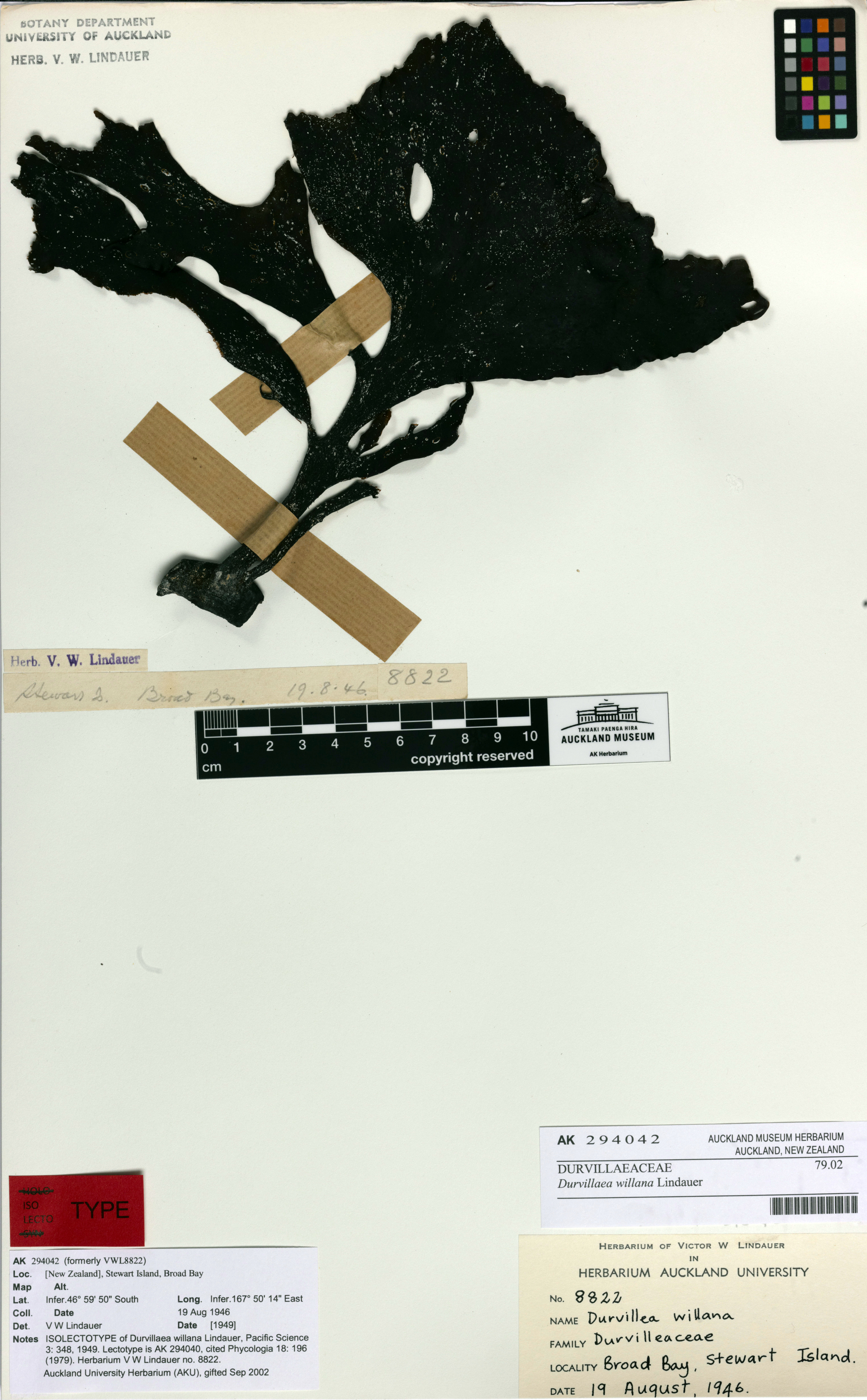
Prepared specimen of D. willana

== Distribution ==
This species of kelp is endemic to New Zealand and is found on the southeastern shores of the North Island, although not in Cook Strait, as well as on the shores of the South Island and Stewart Island.

Gaps in the geographic range of the species may have been caused by earthquake uplift events such as the 1855 Wairarapa earthquake. However, historic uplift (800 – 1400 years before present) in the Akatore fault zone does not seem to have caused any long term disruption in the genetic diversity of the D. willana in that region. This result suggests that the subtidal D. willana may not die-off completely due to earthquake uplift events.
