= Founder takes all =

Tendency of early colonists to dominate the gene pool

In this GIF, the different colors represent various genotypes in a meta-population. Following a revolution that kills some of the populations, the first progenitors to move into the troubled area can build and add to hold the place. Later-arriving progenitors can be 'obstructed' by the anew ascertained residents.

The Founder Takes All (FTA) hypothesis refers to the evolutionary advantages conferred to first-arriving lineages in an ecosystem.

== Overview ==
Density-dependent processes such as gene surfing, high-density blocking, and competitive exclusion can play crucial roles in the spatial structuring of biodiversity. These interrelated demographic processes can generate striking geographic contrasts in the distributions of genes and species. Density-dependent processes refer to biogeographical processes in which population density (relative to resources) constrains the ability of new arriving lineages to establish

It is proposed that well-studied evolutionary and ecological biogeographic patterns of postglacial recolonization, progressive island colonization, microbial sectoring, and even the "Out of Africa" pattern of human expansion are fundamentally similar. All these patterns are underpinned by the "founder takes all" density-dependent principle. For example, following a large-scale earthquake disturbance, two parallel recolonisation events and density-dependent blocking have been hypothesised to explain the occurrence of two distinct spatial sectors of population structure in Durvillaea antarctica on Turakirae Head in New Zealand.

It is hypothesized that older historical constraints of density-independent processes are seen today, within the dramatic biogeographic shifts that occur in response to human-mediated extinction events. Due to these extinction events, surviving lineages can rapidly expand their ranges to replace extinct sister taxa.

== The FTA model ==
The FTA model is underpinned by demographic and ecological phenomena and processes such as the Allee effect, gene surfing, high-density blocking, and priority effects. Early colonizing lineages can reach high densities and thus hinder the success of late-arriving colonizers. It has been suggested that this can strongly influence spatial biodiversity patterns.

Scientific evidence for FTA processes has emerged from a variety of evolutionary, biogeographic, and ecological research areas. Examples include: the sectoring patterns sometimes evident in microbial colonies; phylogeographic sectoring of lineages, inferred to have rapidly expanded into new terrain-following deglaciation; the island progression rule; and sudden biological replacement (lineage turnover) following extirpation.

One possible scientific consequence of FTA dynamics is that gene flow measures based on the genetics of contemporary high-density populations may underestimate actual rates of dispersal and invasion potential.

== See also ==
- Founder effect
- Peripatric speciation
- Genetic drift
- Genetic drift in a population at Wikimedia Commons
