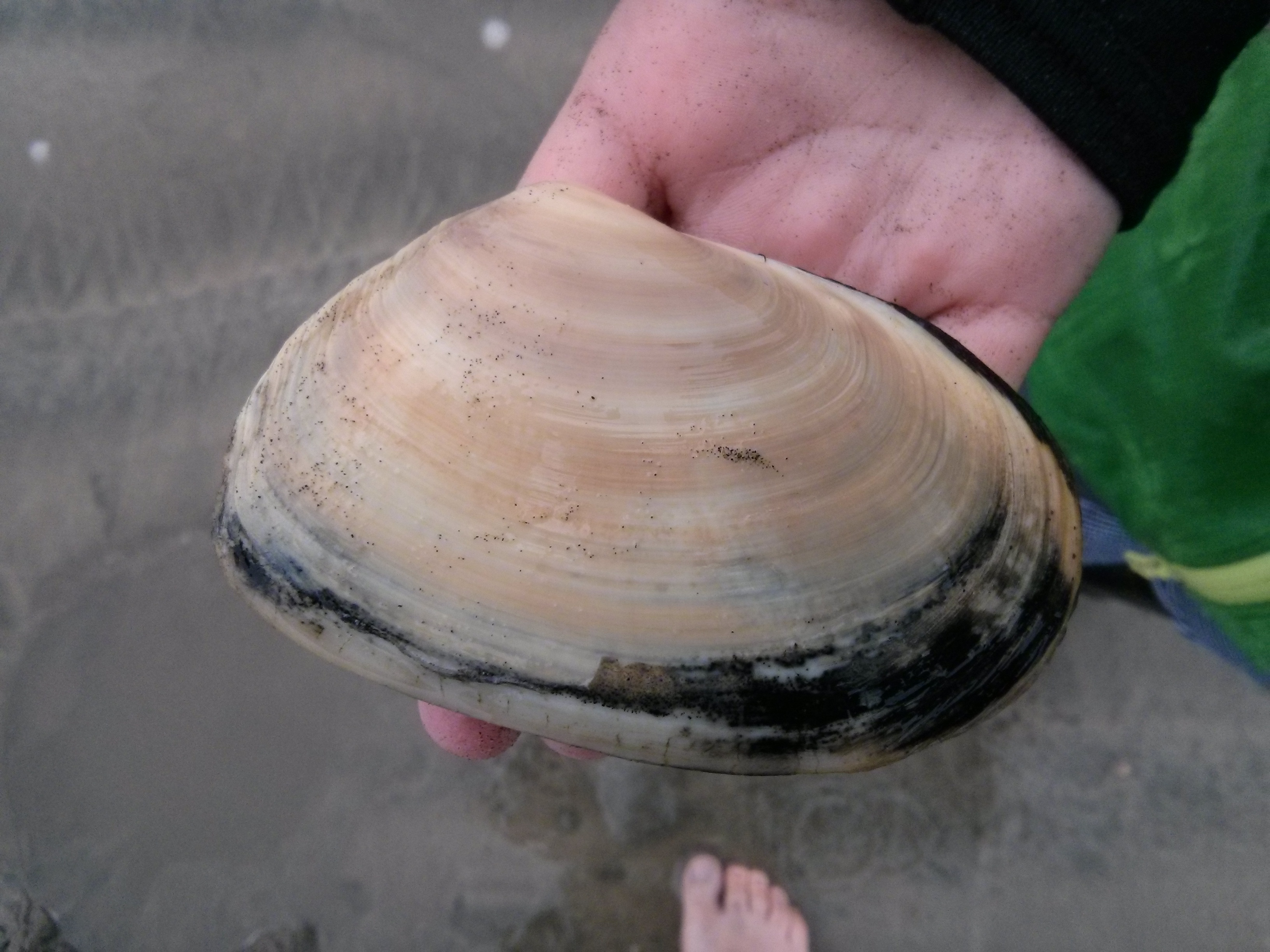
- Toheroa at Oreti Beach, Southland

Scientific classification
- Kingdom: Animalia
- Phylum: Mollusca
- Class: Bivalvia
- Order: Venerida
- Family: Mesodesmatidae
- Genus: Paphies
- Species: P. ventricosa

Binomial name
- Paphies ventricosa (Gray, 1843)

= Toheroa =

Species of bivalve

Paphies ventricosa, or toheroa (a Māori word meaning "long tongue"), is a large bivalve mollusc of the family Mesodesmatidae, endemic to New Zealand.

== Distribution ==
It is found in both the North and South Islands, but the main habitat is the west coast of the North Island. The best grounds are wide fine-sand beaches where there are extensive sand-dunes, enclosing freshwater, which percolates to the sea, there promoting the growth of diatoms and plankton.

== Description ==
Video of a toheroa burying itself in the sand at Oreti Beach, showing the foot and the siphon

The toheroa is a very large shellfish with a solid white, elongated shell with the apex at the middle. Maximum length is 117 mm, height 81 mm, and thickness 38 mm.

== Human use ==
Toheroa are a traditional food for Māori. Toheroa beds were resources that sometimes led to wars, and the shellfish was translocated across New Zealand using pōhā (kelp bags) made from southern bull kelp (Durvillaea poha).

The toheroa has long been a popular seafood, often made into a greenish soup. The soup became an international delicacy after the Royal Tour of Prince Edward in 1920, becoming popular in restaurants in New Zealand, the United Kingdom and Australia. An industry developed around toheroa, including large-scale canning factories.

By the 1950s, toheroa populations had become over-exploited, and there has been a ban on harvesting (except for limited customary purposes) since 1979. However, numbers have not recovered since 1979, due to illegal poaching, poorly policed customary harvesting, vehicle driving on beaches, pollution, reduction in fresh water coming onto beaches, and gas bubble disease.

Toheroa cuisine
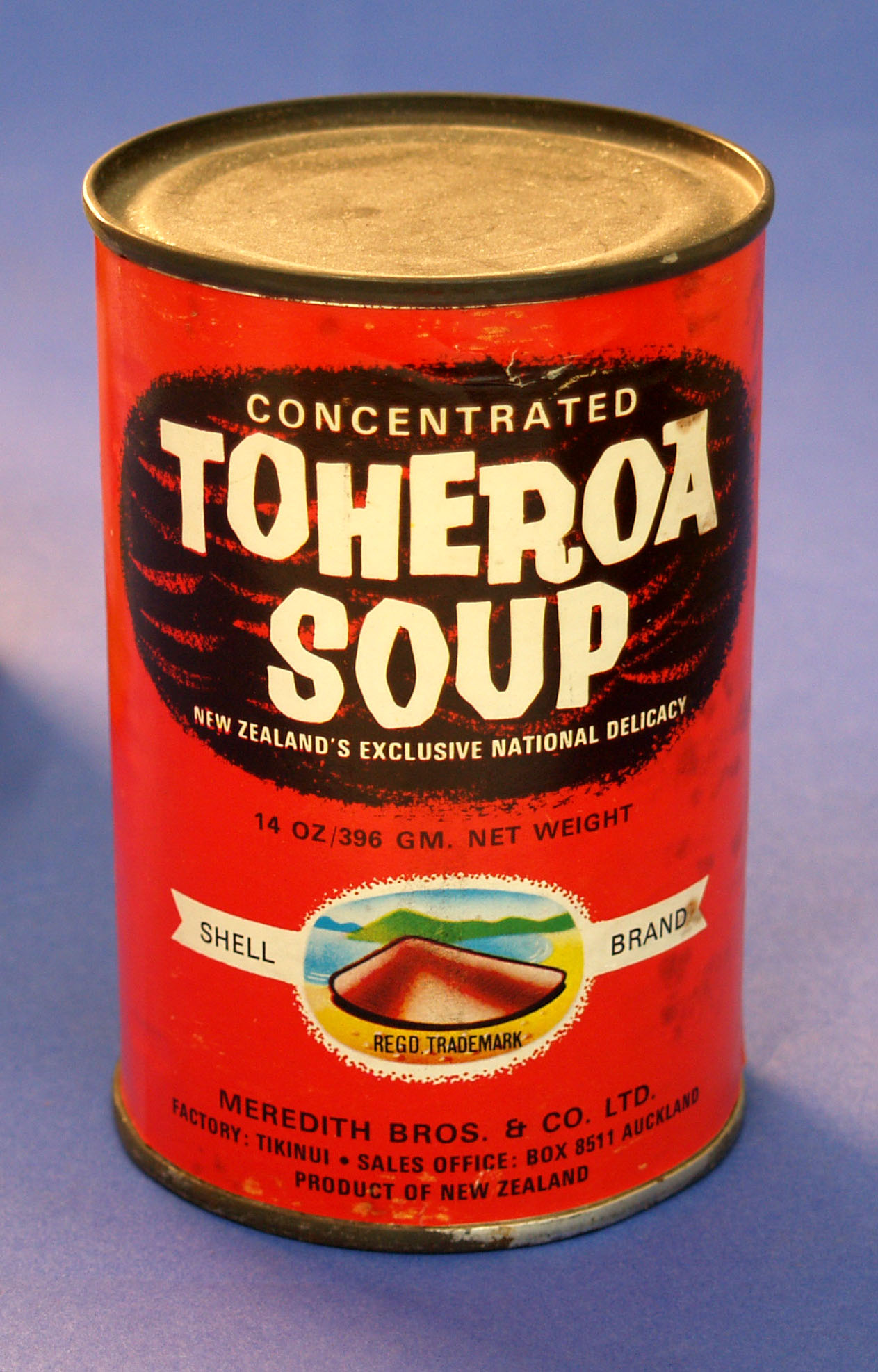

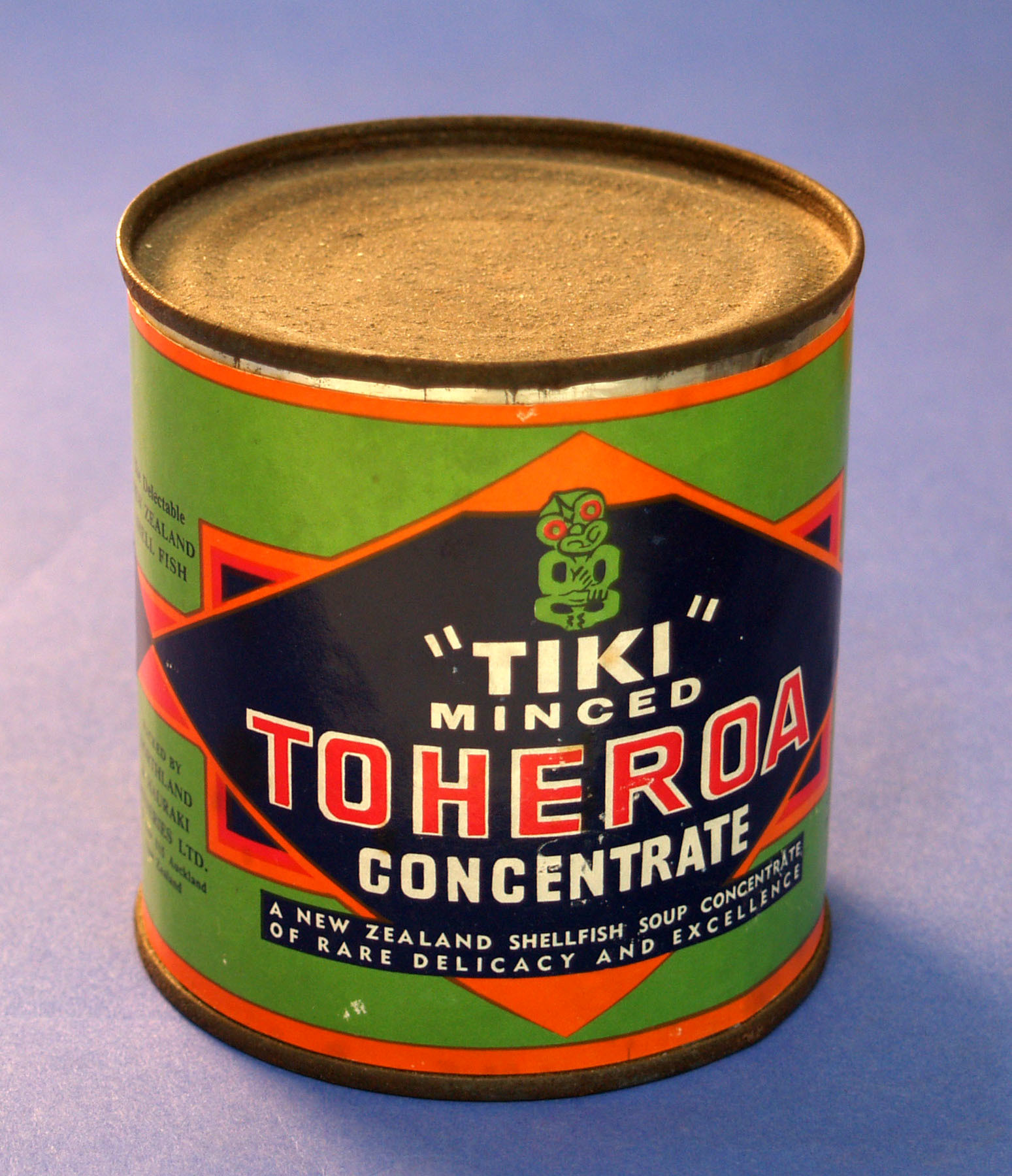
