= Poha =

Poha or POHA may refer to:

- Poha (rice), flattened rice originating from the Indian subcontinent
  - Pohay, breakfast dish made from flattened rice
- Pōhā, a traditional Māori bag made from southern kelp
- Physalis peruviana (Cape gooseberry), species of plant
- Protection from Harassment Act 1997, United Kingdom
- Protection from Harassment Act 2014, Singapore
