= Atactodea striata =

Scientific classification
- Kingdom: Animalia
- Phylum: Mollusca
- Class: Bivalvia
- Order: Venerida
- Family: Mesodesmatidae
- Genus: Atactodea
- Species: A. striata

Binomial name
- Atactodea striata Gmelin, 1791

Species of clam

Atactodea striata, common name striated beach clam or striated little trough shell, is a species of surf clam, a marine bivalve mollusk in the family Mesodesmatidae.

== Description ==
Atactodea is the abundant, small, relatively strongly concentrically ribbed mesodesmatid.

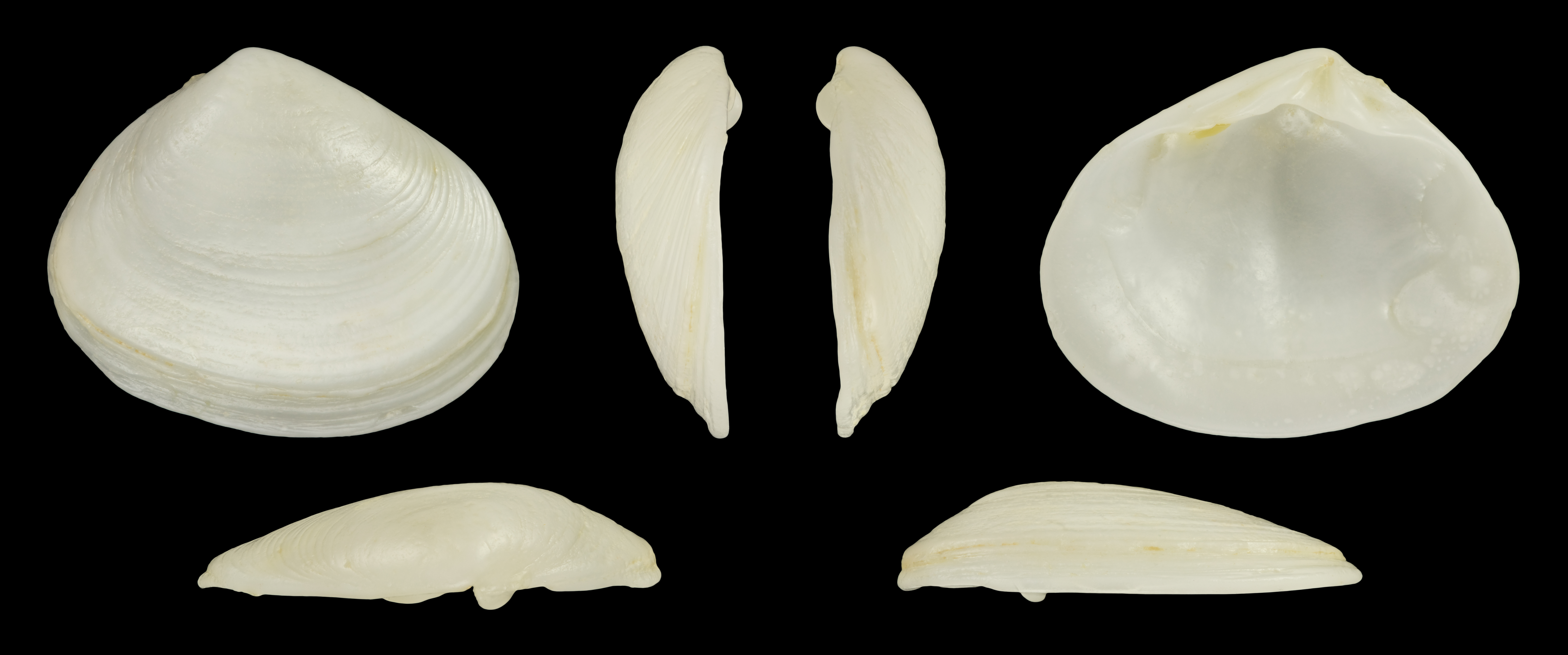
Right valve

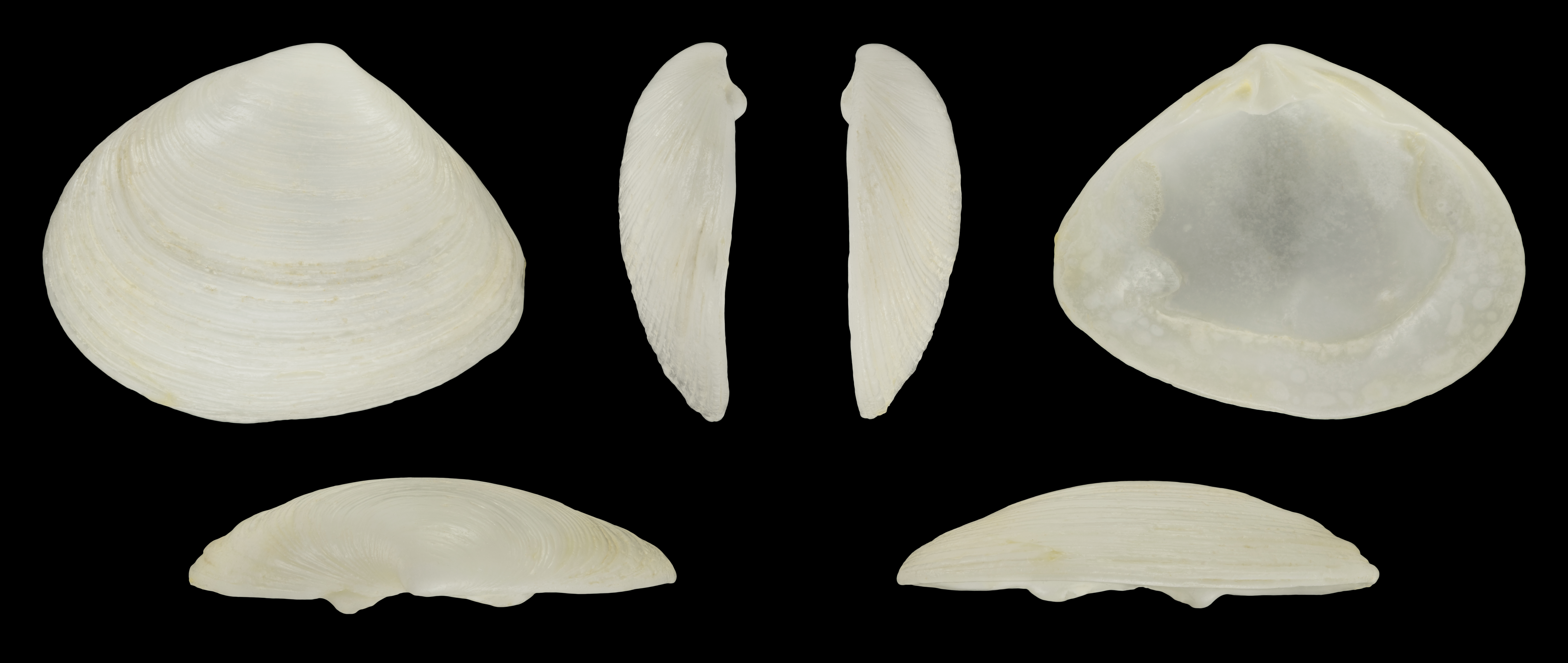
Left valve

== Distribution ==
Found in atoll lagoons throughout the Indo-Pacific including Madagascar, India, Viet Nam, China, Philippines, Tarawa, Malaysia, Australia, Papua New Guinea, New Caledonia, Tuvalu, Fiji, Japan (up to Kii Peninsula, Honshu), and Vanuatu. It has been introduced in the Mediterranean Sea in the areas of Israel and Malta.

== Habitat ==
Found in sandy substrates in the intertidal zone. This small surf clam may occur in abundance on high intertidal lagoon beaches.

== Human use ==
These clams are readily available by foraging the inshore tidal flats, mangroves and rocks. Archeological evidence indicates that Atactodea striata were used as a subsistence food by the Lapita, a Neolithic people of the South Pacific, at least as early as 4,700 years ago. They are among the most common bivalves found in 2000 year-old shell middens in Papua New Guinea and in more recent shell middens in Australia. Called "Alure" in South Vanuatu Languages, Atactodea striata is harvested by the indigenous people of Vanuatu as a minor subsistence food. Atactodea striata is harvested, mostly by women, by gleaning intertidal zones. Women fishers walk the shoreline and shallows collecting Atactodea along with a variety of other common clams, bivalves, crabs, chitons, sea slugs, anemone and octopus. On Tarawa, indigenous people harvest Atactodea striata as a preferred baby food because of its small size.
