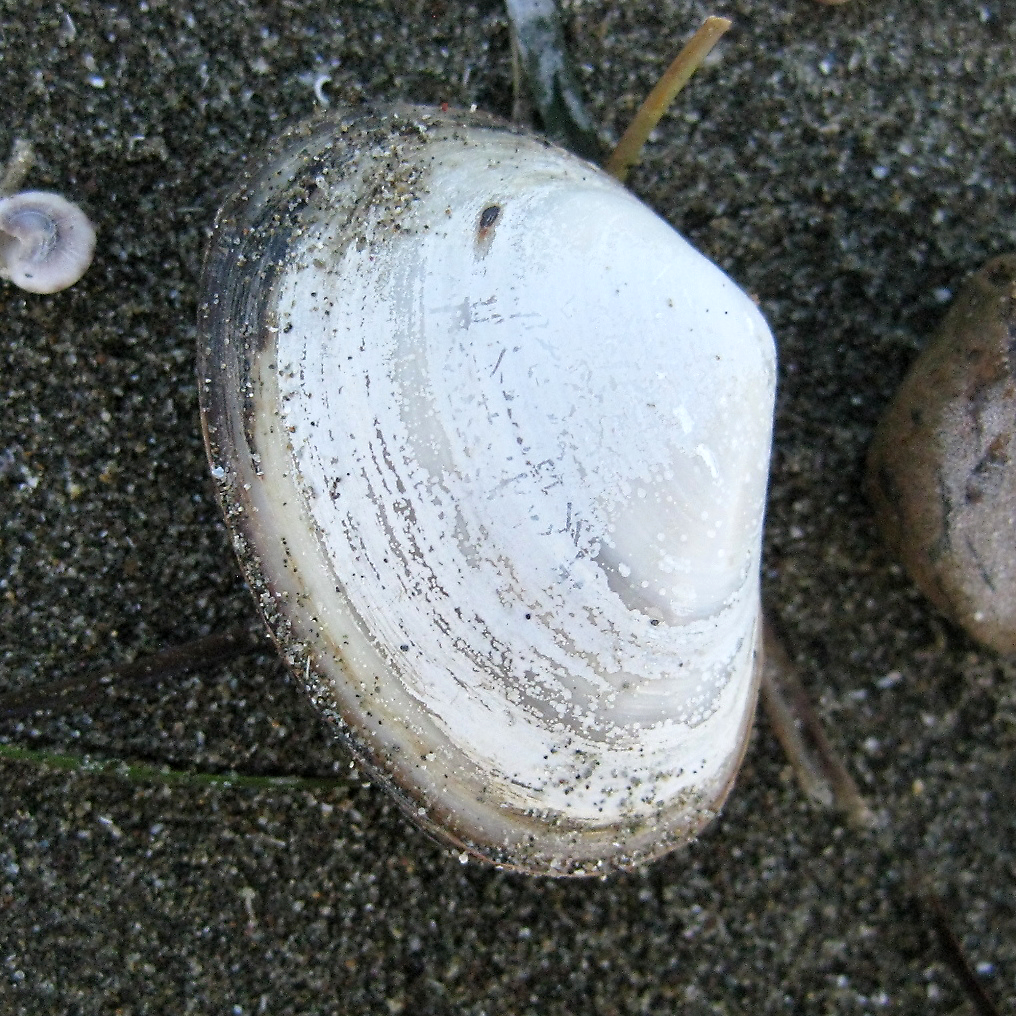

Scientific classification
- Kingdom: Animalia
- Phylum: Mollusca
- Class: Bivalvia
- Order: Venerida
- Superfamily: Mactroidea
- Family: Mesodesmatidae
- Genus: Paphies
- Species: P. australis

Binomial name
- Paphies australis Gmelin, 1790

Synonyms
- Donacilla novaezeelandiae d'Orbigny, 1845; Erycina ovata Gray, 1825; Machaena ovata Gray, 1843; Mactra ovata Wood, 1828; Mesodesma aucklandicum E von Martens, 1879; Mesodesma chemnitzii Deshayes, 1832; Mesodesma ovalis Reeve, 1854; Mya atlantica Spengler, 1793; Mya australis Gmelin, 1791 (original combination); Paphies (Crassatella) roissyana Lesson, 1831; Paphies roissyana Lesson, 1831

= Paphies australis =

Species of bivalve

Paphies australis or pipi (/ˈpɪpi/; derived from the Māori language) is a bivalve mollusc of the family Mesodesmatidae, endemic to New Zealand.

The pipi is a shellfish with a solid white, elongated symmetrical shell with the apex at the middle. It is covered by a thin yellow periostracum. Its closest relative, the tuatua (Paphies subtriangulata), has an asymmetrical shell, with an off-centre hinge.

The pipi is abundant on flat sandy beaches, in sandy and silty mud in estuaries, and harbours where there is considerable water flow.

By releasing a thread of mucus, which makes them more buoyant, they are able to float in the water column and move to new locations. Where they find good living conditions, their numbers can exceed more than 1000 individuals per square metre.

== Pipi as food ==
Pipi are edible and easily collected for food; traditional cooking methods include boiling and making into fritters. They are often used as the "clams" in clam chowder. The harvest limit in New Zealand is 50 per person per day, and although a minimum size is not stipulated in the regulations, only larger pipi should be taken. For Māori, pipi are a traditional food resource, and in earlier times were gathered in specific flax baskets made for this purpose. Smaller specimens would fall between the woven strips and back into the beds to grow as the basket was gently swirled through the water.

Maximum length is 83 millimetres (3.3 in), and height 51 millimetres (2.0 in).

== Conservation ==
Although it is an under-researched field, it is known that population health of pipi has been declining in Northern New Zealand since at least 2009.
