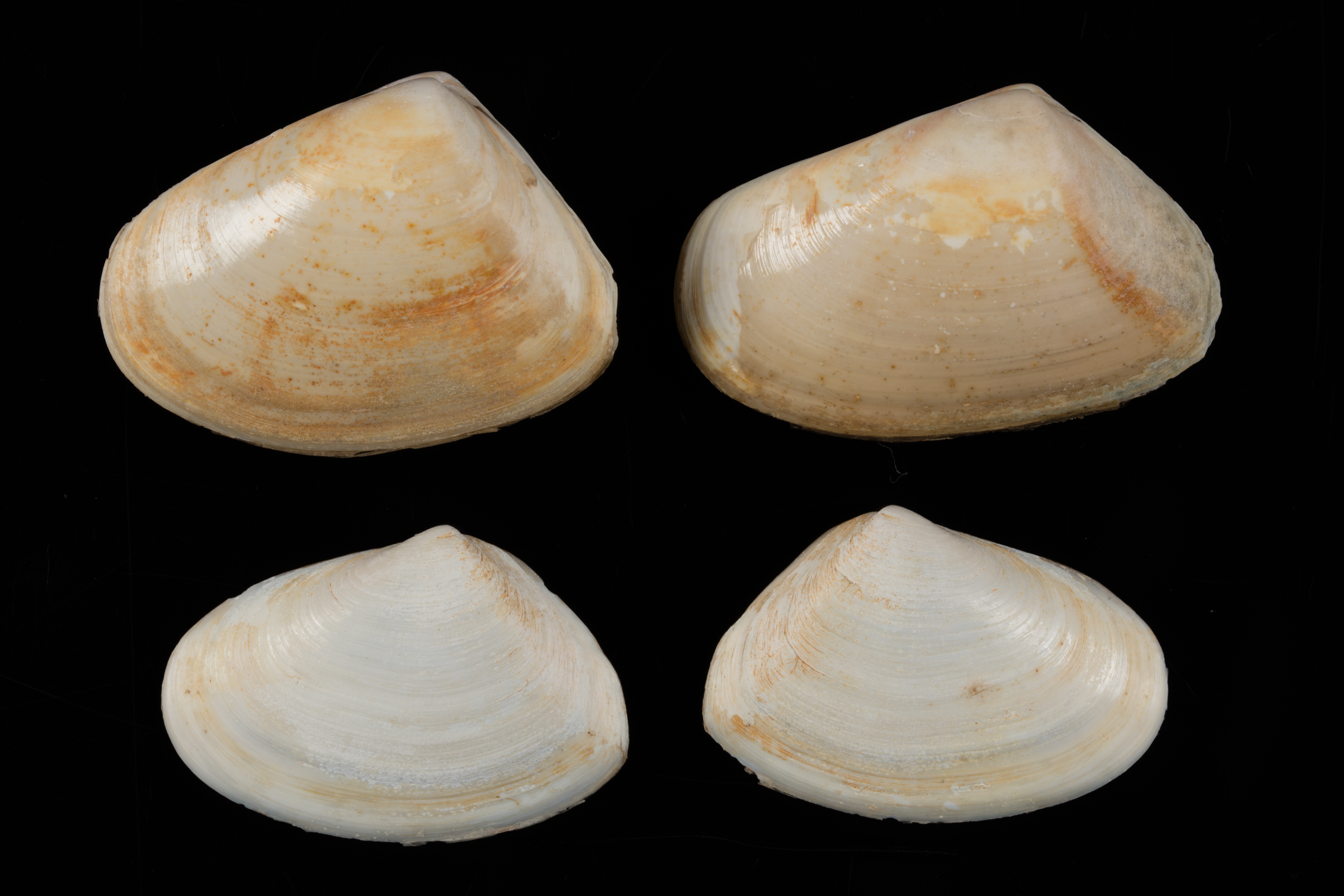

Scientific classification
- Kingdom: Animalia
- Phylum: Mollusca
- Class: Bivalvia
- Order: Venerida
- Superfamily: Mactroidea
- Family: Mesodesmatidae
- Genus: Paphies
- Species: P. subtriangulata

Binomial name
- Paphies subtriangulata (W. Wood, 1828)

Synonyms
- Erycina subangulata Gray, 1825; Mactra subtriangulata W. Wood, 1828; Mesodesma cuneata Hanley, 1842; Mesodesma reentsii Römer, 1862; Mesodesma spissa Reeve, 1854; Paphies porrecta (Marwick, 1928)

= Tuatua =

Species of bivalve

Paphies subtriangulata is a species of edible bivalve clam known as tuatua, a member of the family Mesodesmatidae and endemic to New Zealand. It is found on all three of the main New Zealand islands, buried in fine clean sand on ocean beaches.

The large shell is asymmetrical, with the hinge at one side. Its closest relative, the pipi (Paphies australis), has a symmetrical shell. Due to their shell shape, and how they burrow underneath the sand, they can withstand the high-energy waves from the ocean. Using this knowledge, we can identify where they will adapt the most to, and this is the energetic oceanfront.

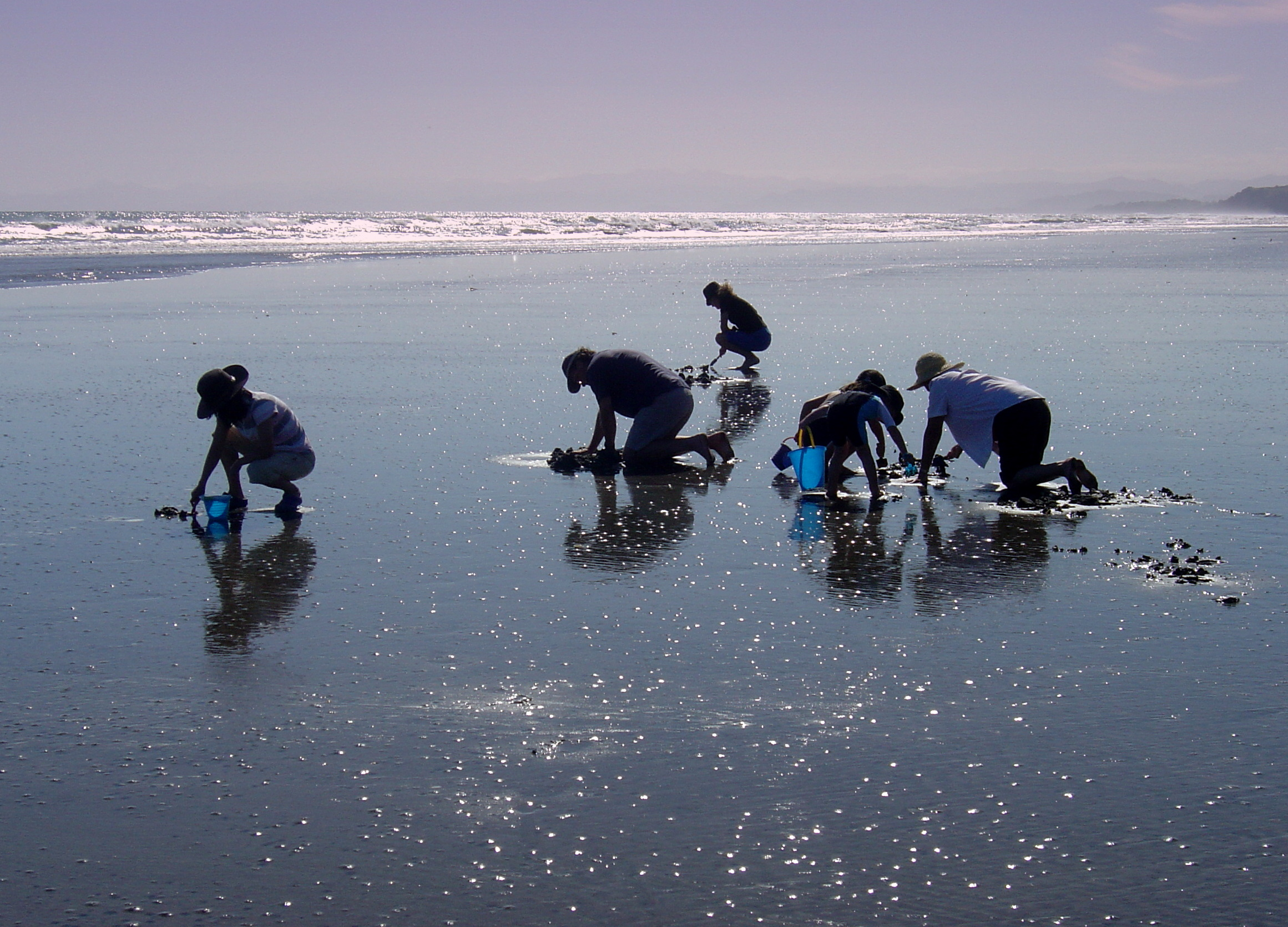
Clam digging for tuatua at Ōhope beach

The soft parts of the animal are an edible delicacy, made into fritters or boiled and served on the shell. Historically the species has been used as a food source by the Māori, and its shell is a common component of excavated Māori middens.

The clam burrows beneath the sand, and does so very quickly, making it a challenge to dig for at times. It also squirts water when threatened. All tuatua are protected with legal limits on their capture. In some areas one digger may bag no more than 50 to 150 tuatuas per day, depending on location.

== Subspecies ==
Three subspecies have been recognised:

- Paphies subtriangulata subtriangulata (Wood, 1828)
  Distribution: throughout North and South Islands
  Maximum length is 76 millimetres (3.0 in), height 48 millimetres (1.9 in), and thickness 28 millimetres (1.1 in).
- Paphies subtriangulata porrecta (Marwick, 1928)
  Distribution: Chatham Islands
  Maximum length: 93 millimetres (3.7 in), maximum height: 57 millimetres (2.2 in).
- Paphies subtriangulata quoyii (Deshayes, 1832)
  Distribution: throughout North and South Islands
  Size: Thicker relative to length - Maximum length is 86 millimetres (3.4 in), height 65 millimetres (2.6 in), and thickness 38 millimetres (1.5 in).
