= Atactodea =

Scientific classification
- Kingdom: Animalia
- Phylum: Mollusca
- Class: Bivalvia
- Order: Venerida
- Family: Mesodesmatidae
- Genus: Atactodea; Gmelin, 1791

Type species
- Mactra glabrata Gmelin, 1791

Genus of bivalves

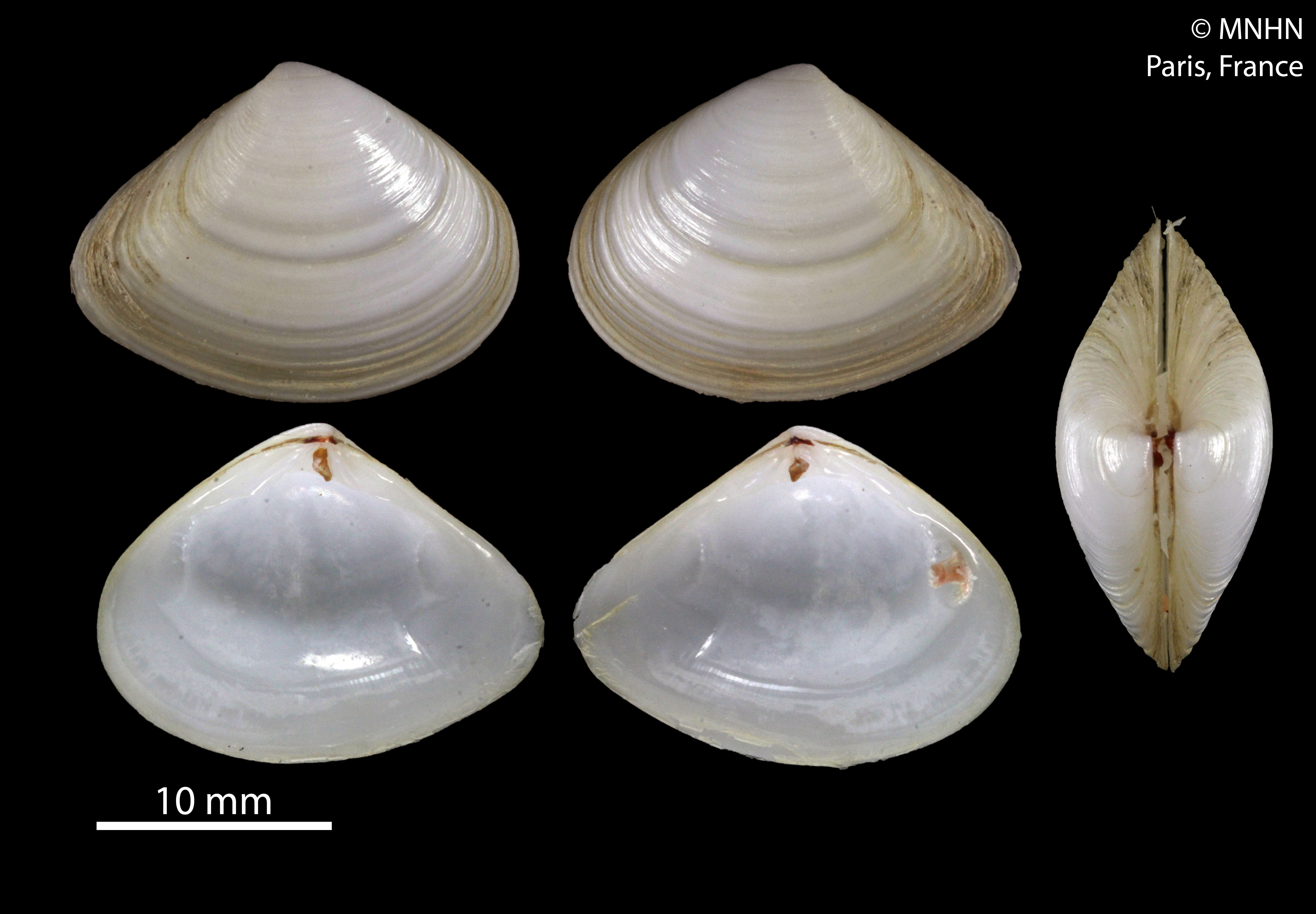
Atactodea striata

Atactodea is a genus of saltwater clams of the family Mesodesmatidae described by William Healey Dall in 1895.

The following species are recognized:

- Atactodea cuneata (Lamarck, 1818)
- Atactodea erycinaea (Lamarck, 1818)
- Atactodea heterodon (Reeve, 1854)
- Atactodea layardi (Reeve, 1854)
- Atactodea striata (Gmelin, 1791)
- Atactodea subobtusa (Jousseaume, 1895)
