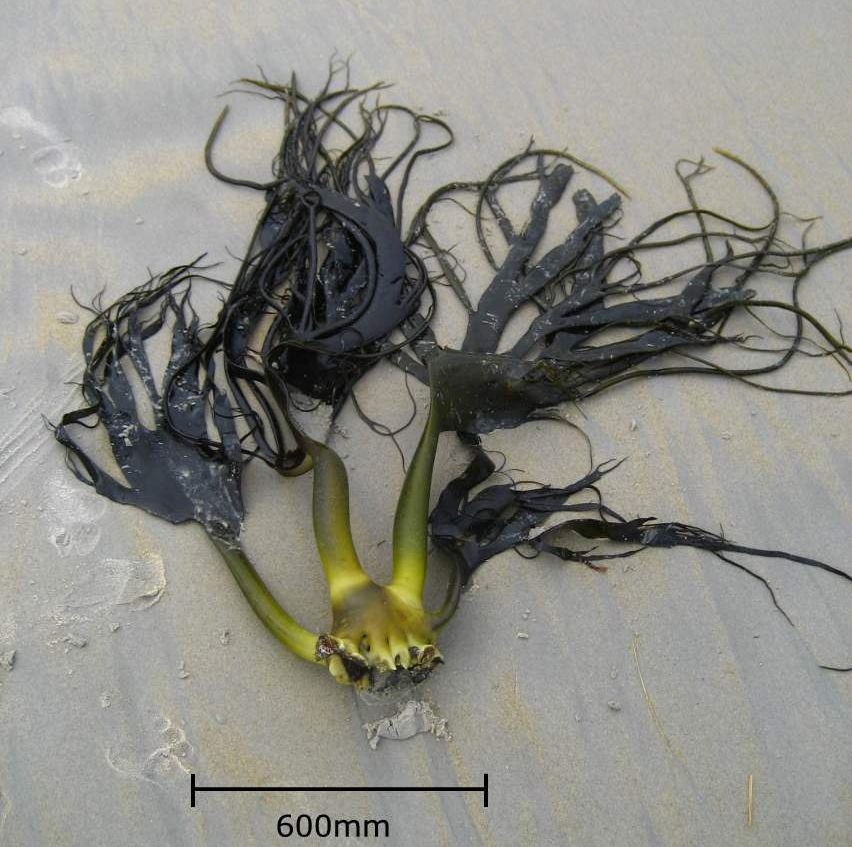
- Durvillea antarctica. Washed up on Sandfly Bay, Otago, New Zealand

Scientific classification
- Domain: Eukaryota
- Supergroup: Stramenopiles
- Division: Ochrophyta
- Class: Phaeophyceae
- Order: Fucales
- Family: Durvillaeaceae
- Genus: Durvillaea
- Species: D. antarctica

Binomial name
- Durvillaea antarctica (Chamisso) Hariot

= Durvillaea antarctica =

Species of seaweed

Durvillaea antarctica, also known as bull kelp, cochayuyo and rimurapa, is a large, robust species of southern bull kelp found on the coasts of Chile, southern Peru, New Zealand, and Macquarie Island. D. antarctica, an alga, does not have air bladders, but floats due to a unique honeycomb structure within the alga's blades, which also helps the kelp avoid being damaged by the strong waves.

== Description ==
D. antarctica at Manurewa Point, in the Wairarapa

The blades of Durvillaea antarctica are green to golden brown with a leathery texture. The honeycomb structure of the blade gives strength and buoyancy. This novel structure is thought to be responsible for the wide distribution of this genus, as the kelp is able to float when its holdfast fails. It can colonise other coastlines in this manner, and has been shown to carry communities of invertebrates across vast ocean distances from one shore to another. Specimens of D. antarctica have been found to float for up to 210 days, during which time high wind speeds transport kelp "rafts" up to 10,000 km (6,200 mi). Environmental factors such as temperature, solar radiation, and surface winds (all of which vary with latitude) affect buoyancy of rafts and their rate of travel. Rafts of D. antarctica are more likely to disperse offshore if plants detach during outgoing tides during autumn and winter. It is thought that this 'rafting' with Durvillaea antarctica and other floating seaweeds allowed a wide range of species to recolonise sub-Antarctic shores scoured clean by ice during the last Ice Age.

The holdfast of D. antarctica is large and is very difficult to remove. D. antarctica has to resist forces equivalent to 1,100 km/h (680 mph) on land. The holdfast failing is usually the result of worms and molluscs which feed on the tissue because of the sheltered habitat it creates. It is also common for its host rock to be broken off without the holdfast losing its grip, with this contributing significantly to erosion in some areas. Recruitment rates of this species are very low, therefore the ecological impact of harvesting this species is great.

Morphology of D. antarctica
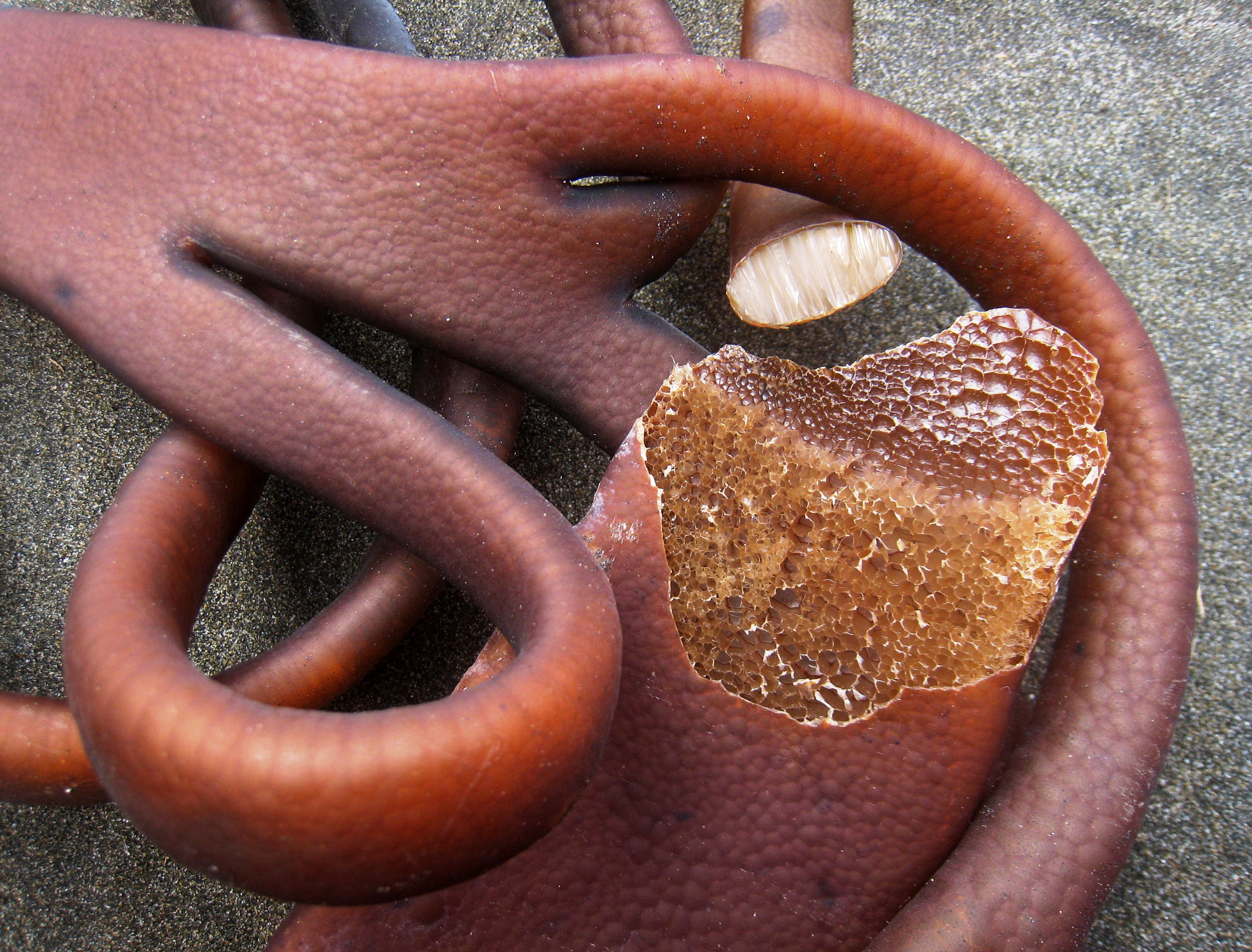
Cross-section revealing the honeycomb structure of blades

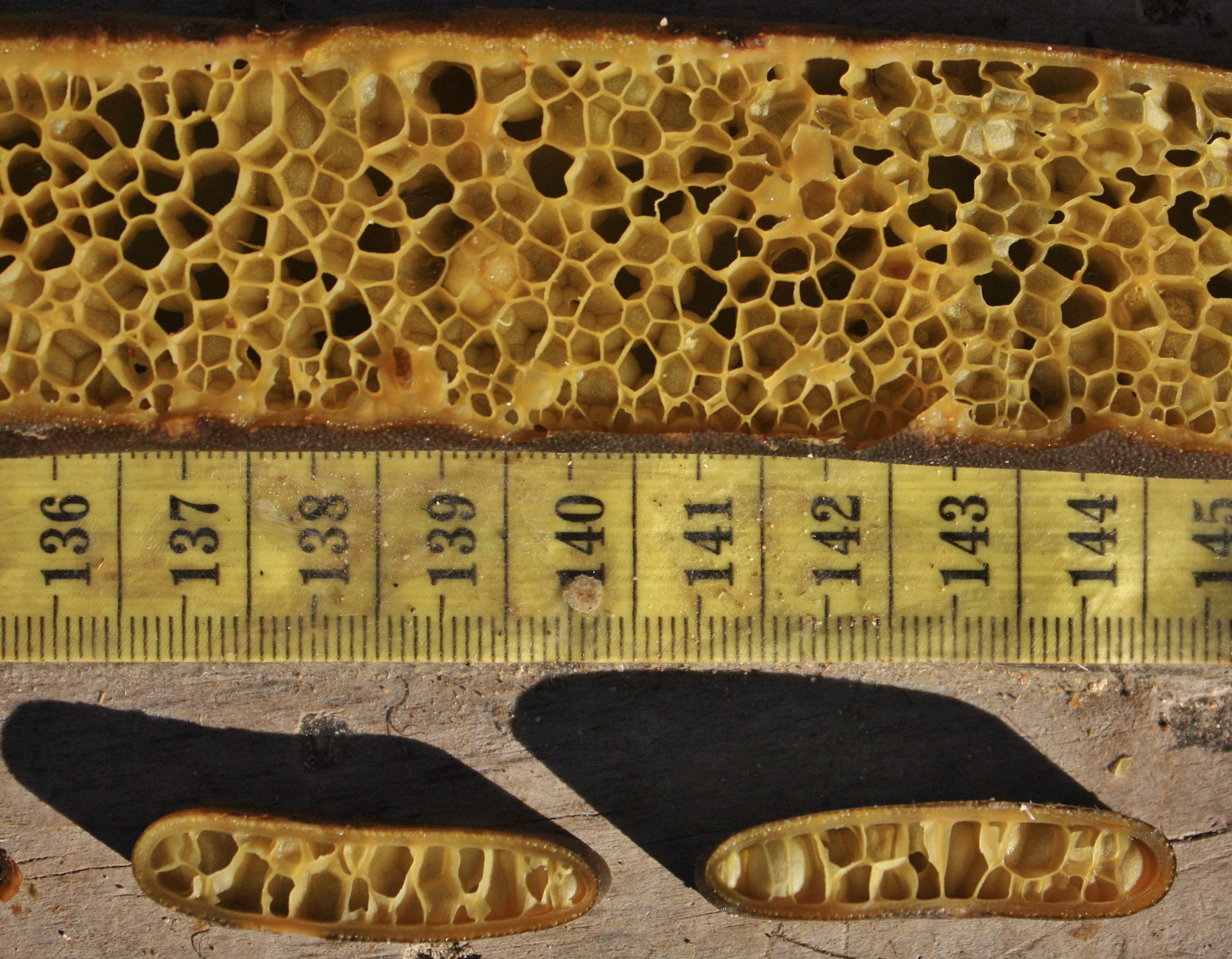
Another cross-section

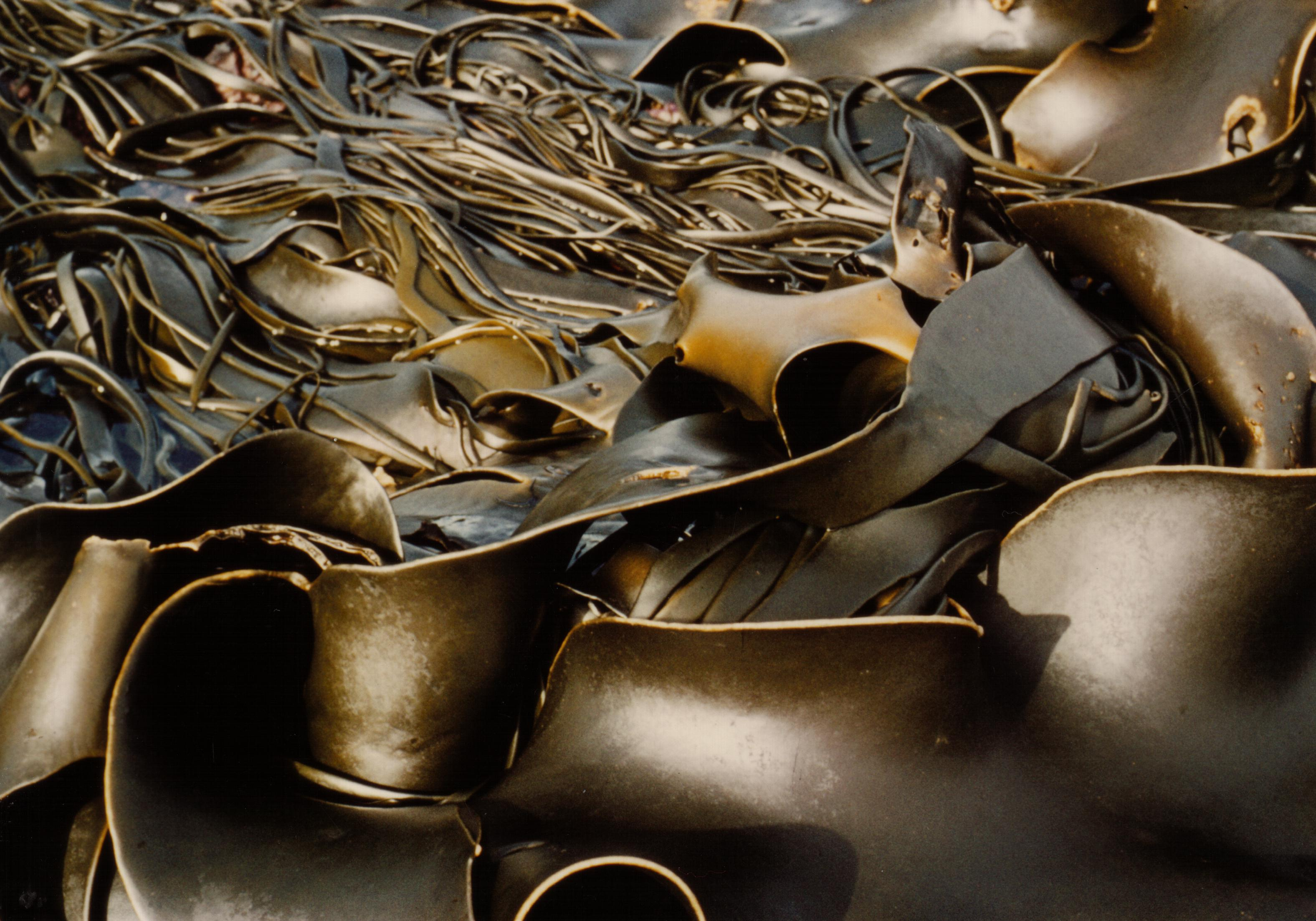
The long, narrow and dark blades of D. antarctica

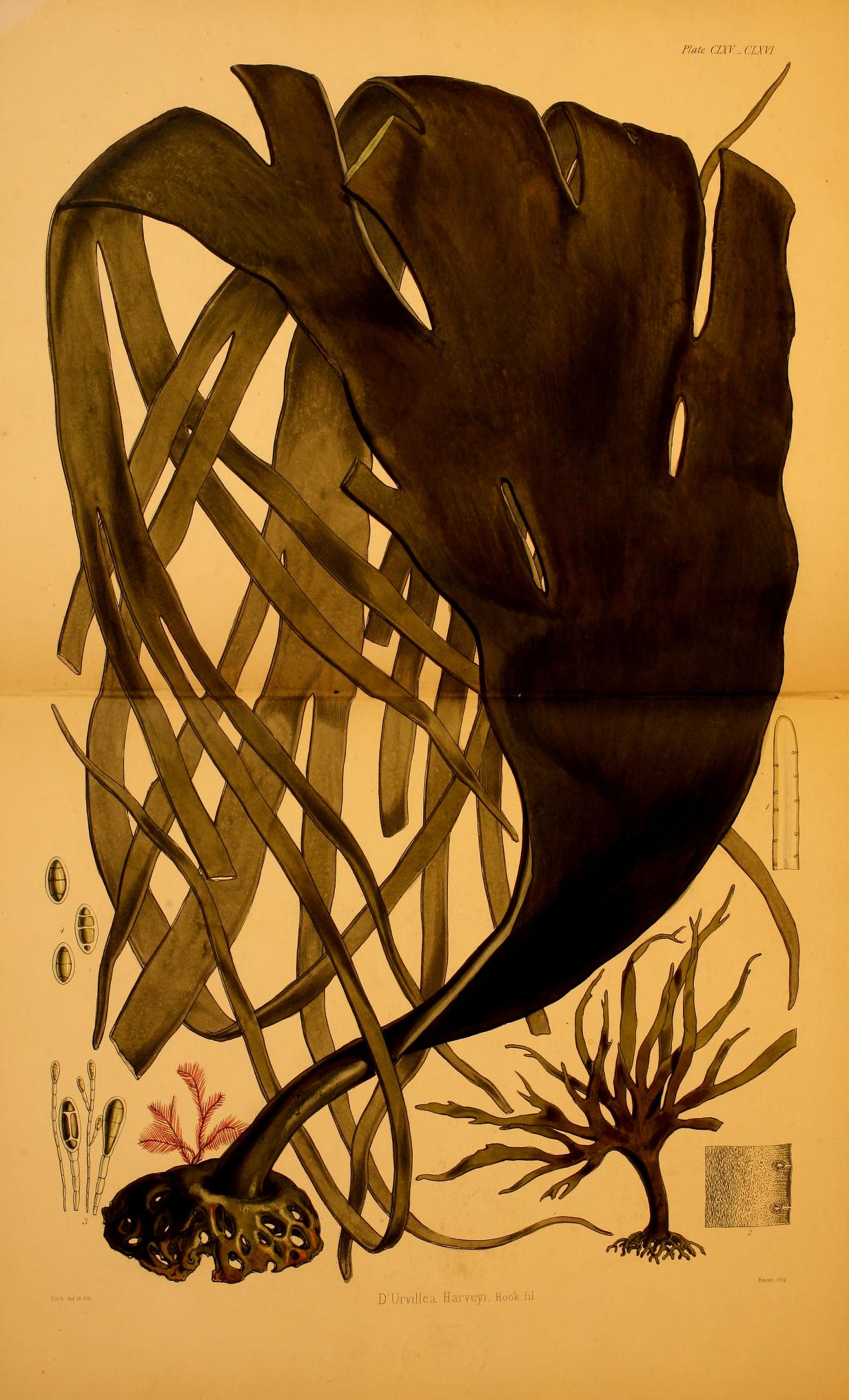
Illustration of D. harveyi, now D. antarctica, by Walter Hood Fitch for J. D. Hooker's Flora Antarctica, 1843–1859

== Taxonomy ==
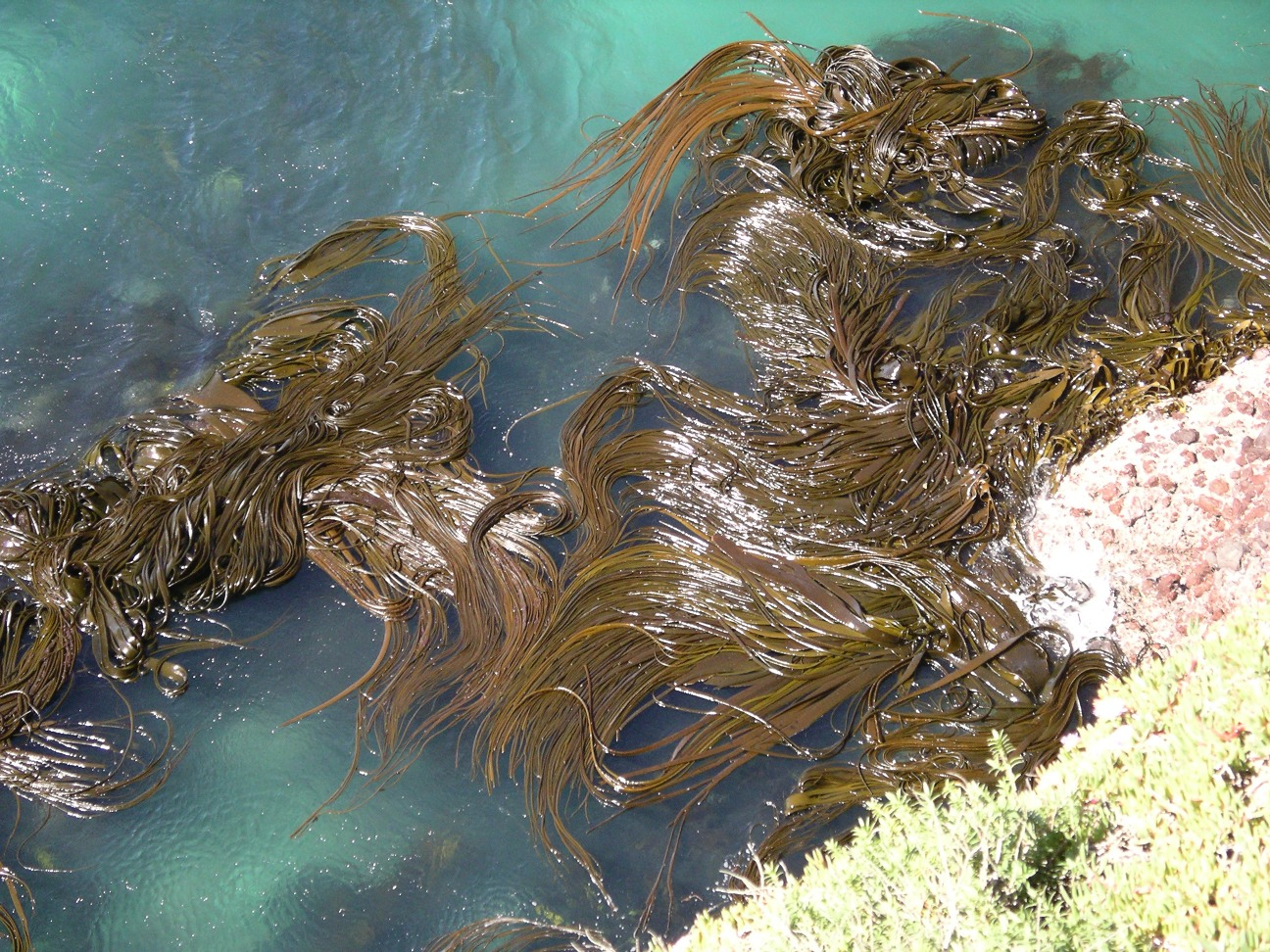
D. antarctica in Otago, New Zealand

The species was first described in 1822, as Fucus antarcticus, and revised in 1892 as Durvillaea antarctica.

In 2012, a taxonomic revision led to the recognition of a new species, Durvillaea poha, based on genetic, morphological and ecological evidence, which was previously recognised as the 'cape' lineage of Durvillaea antarctica. D. poha is the only other species in the genus to share the honeycombed structure and buoyancy of D. antarctica. D. poha occurs only in southern New Zealand and on subantarctic islands (including Snares and Auckland Islands), whereas D. antarctica has a wider distribution, and is found around New Zealand, Chile and other subantarctic islands. In southern New Zealand, D. poha and D. antarctica can be found growing together, although D. poha normally grows higher up or further back on the rock platforms, or in more sheltered bays, where wave force is weaker. D. poha generally has wider fronds than D. antarctica, and can appear more 'orange' across the frond area. Mitochondrial introgression has been observed between the two species, where some plants in Wellington exhibited the nuclear DNA of D. poha but also mitochondrial DNA belonging to D. antarctica.

Further diversity, with additional unclassified lineages have been identified within the species.

Cladogram of Durvillaea showing diversity within D. antarctica

- - - - - - D. willana
      - - - D. potatorum
        - - D. amatheiae
  - - - - D. fenestrata
    - - - - D. incurvata
      - - - - D. poha
        - - - - D. chathamensis
              - D. antarctica (New Zealand north)
          - - - D. antarctica (New Zealand south)
            - - D. antarctica (Subantarctic and Chile)

== Etymology ==
The genus name Durvillaea was given in memory of the French explorer Jules Dumont d'Urville, while the Latin derived epithet refers to antarctic, due to the species' distribution in the southern oceans.

The Māori language name rimurapa is based on a common Polynesian word for seaweed-like living things, rimu, and is likely the basis for the Māori language name for pasta (parāoa rimurapa). The common English language name bull kelp is unknown, but likely relates to the whip-like shape or the leathery texture of the species.

== Life cycle ==
Durvillaea antarctica reproduces sexually by producing egg and sperm that are released into the water. Eggs and sperm are produced on specific sites of the frond. A large individual can produce 100 million eggs in twelve hours. The season when reproduction occurs varies with location, but is generally during winter months. Eggs are small and disperse over short distances, and they generally require calm or moderate wave action to settle and successfully attach to substrates.

== Epifauna, parasites and rafting ==
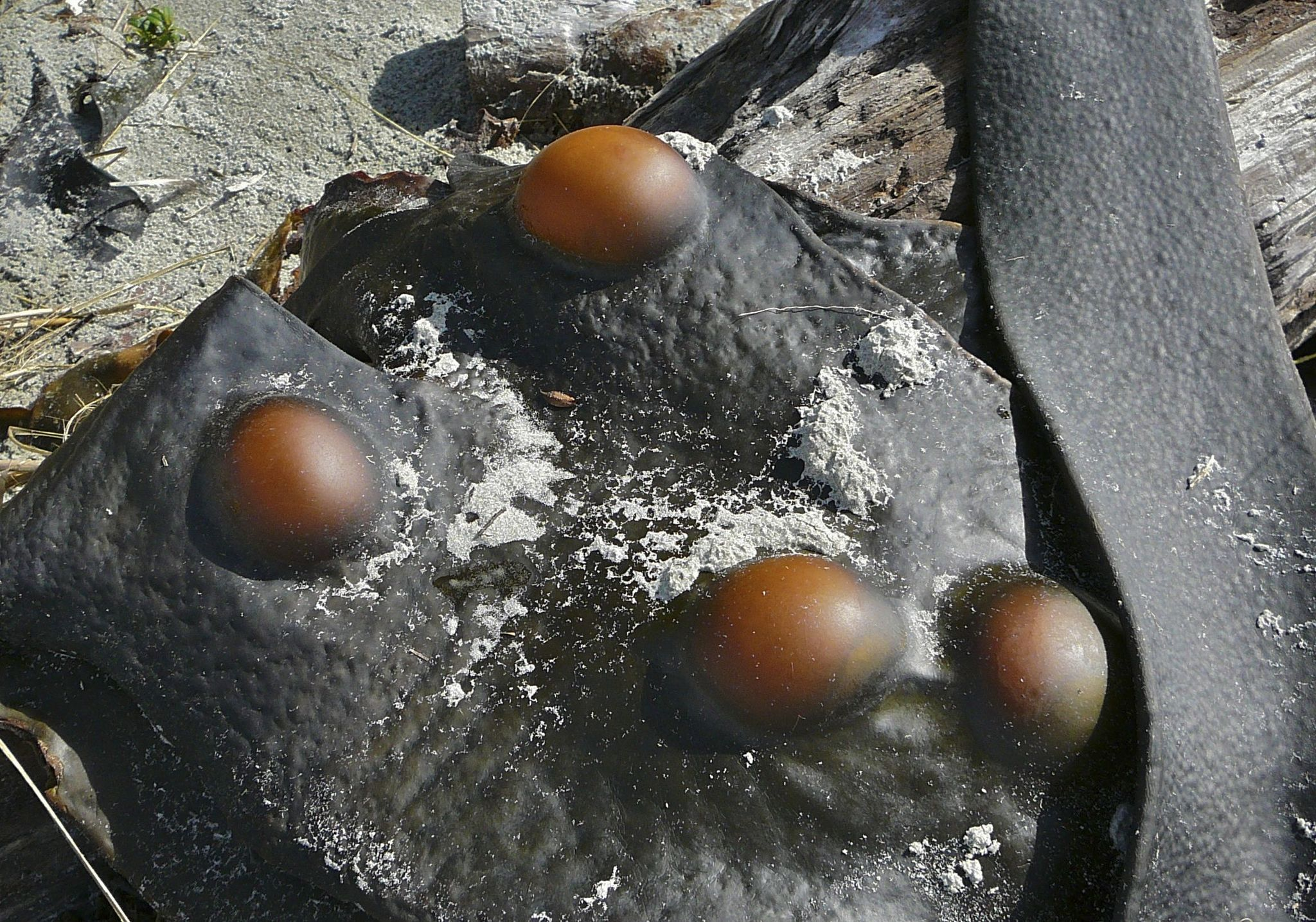
Beachcast D. antarctica kelp frond with blisters caused by an infection

Holdfasts of D. antarctica are often inhabited by a diverse array of epifaunal invertebrates, many of which burrow into and graze on the kelp. In New Zealand, epifaunal species include the crustaceans Parawaldeckia kidderi, P. karaka and Limnoria stephenseni, and the molluscs Cantharidus roseus, Onchidella marginata, Onithochiton neglectus, and Sypharochiton sinclairi. The intertidal spider Desis marina also inhabits the holdfasts of D. antarctica.

Plants of D. antarctica can detach from substrates, particularly during storms. The kelp floats as a raft and can travel vast distances at sea, driven by ocean currents. Kelp-associated invertebrates can be transported inside of drifting holdfasts, potentially leading to long-distance dispersal and a significant impact upon the population genetic structure of those species.

Fronds of D. antarctica can be infected by an endophytic, phaeophycean algal parasite Herpodiscus durvillaeae (Lindauer) G. R. South. Fronds can also be infected Maullinia, a genus of intracellular, protistan parasites. Based on genetic evidence, both H. durvillaeae and Maullinia have likely been dispersed across the Southern Hemisphere via rafting bull kelp.

== Distribution ==
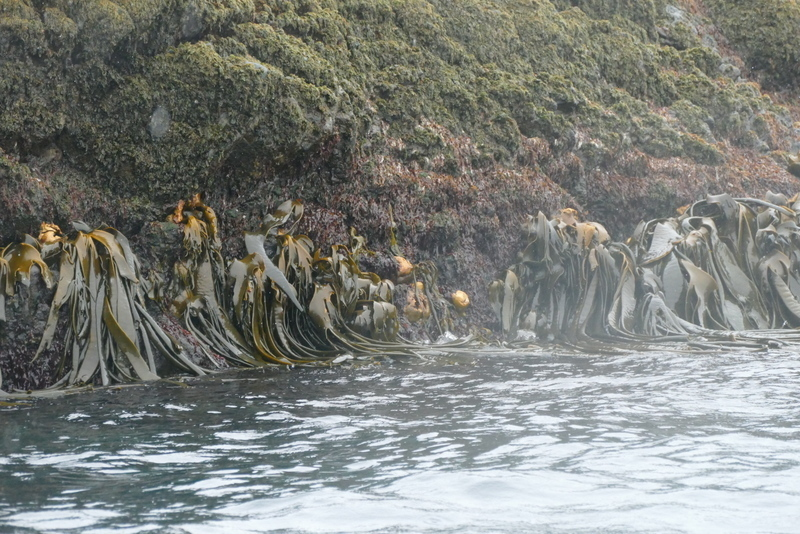
D. antarctica growing in Cooper Bay, South Georgia

Durvillaea antarctica has a circumpolar distribution between the latitudes of 29°S and 55°S, found in Chile, southern New Zealand, and Macquarie Island. The type locality is Cape Horn, Chile.

It is found on exposed shores, especially in the northern parts of its range, and attaches itself with a strong holdfast.

== Human use ==
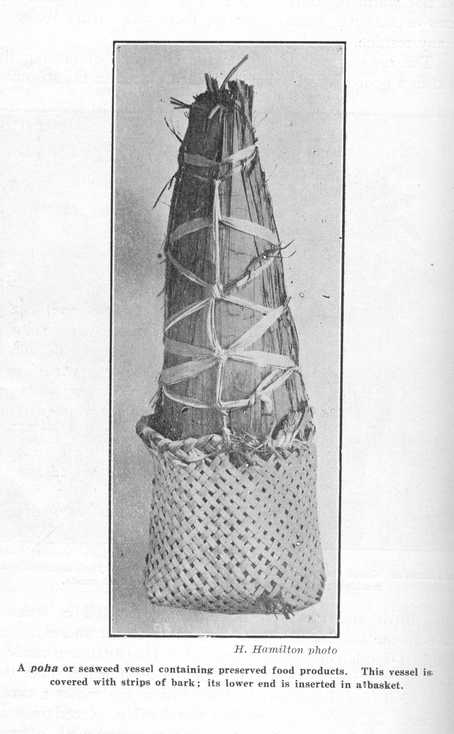
A pōhā covered with tōtara bark and inserted into a flax basket

=== Chilean culture ===
==== Use in cuisine ====
Stems and holdfasts of D. antarctica and D. incurvata are harvested from the coast of Chile and is used in Chilean cuisine for various recipes, including salads and stews. In Quechua the species is called: cochayuyo (cocha: lake, and yuyo: weed), and hulte. The Mapuche indigenous people refer to it as collofe or kollof.

==== Expression ====
The expression remojar el cochayuyo (literally: to soak the cochayuyo) is used in Chilean Spanish to refer to sexual intercourse. The expression derives from the fact that harvested D. antarctica is preserved by being sun-dried and then softened by soaking in a dish of water.

Cochayuyo cuisine
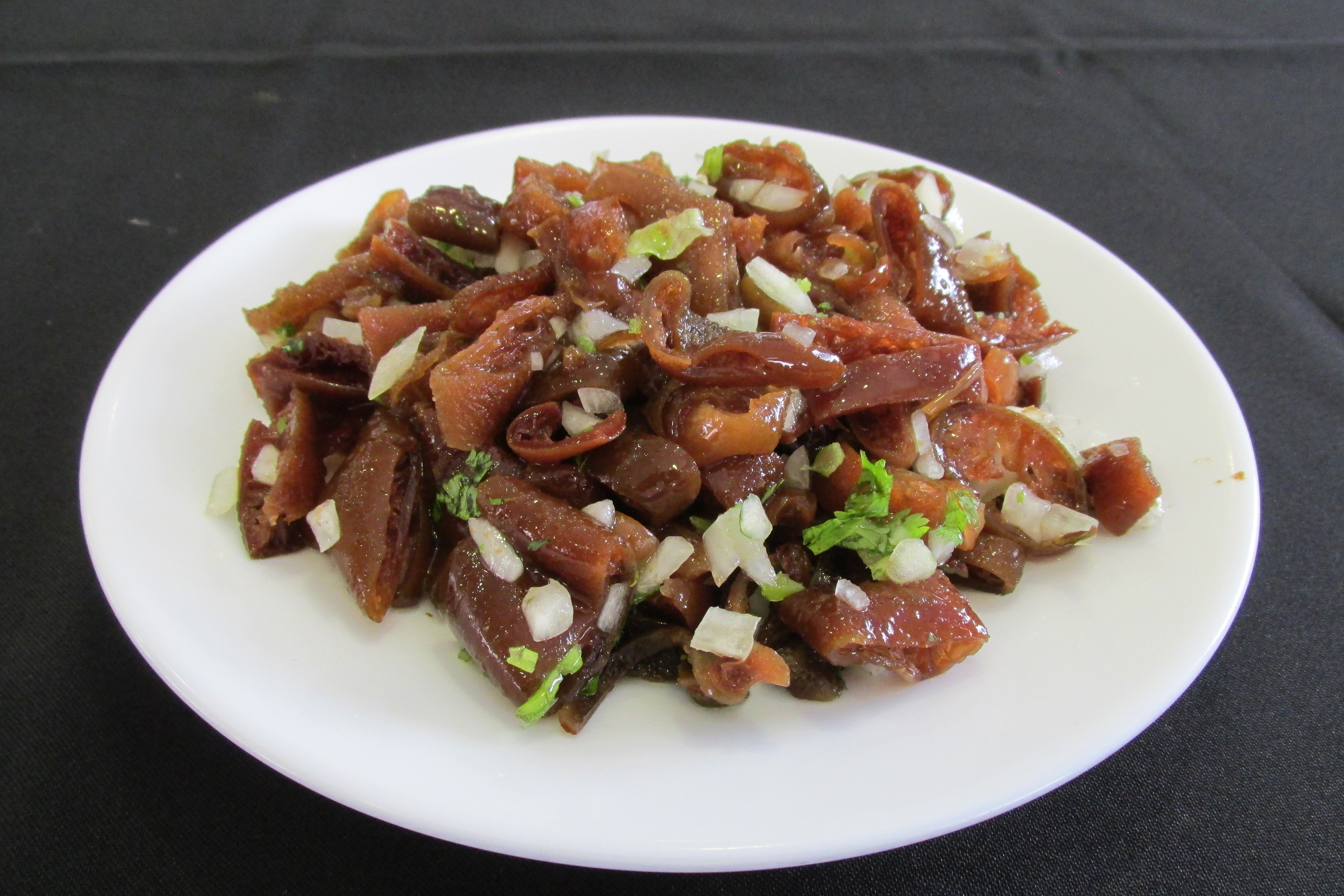
Cochayuyo salad

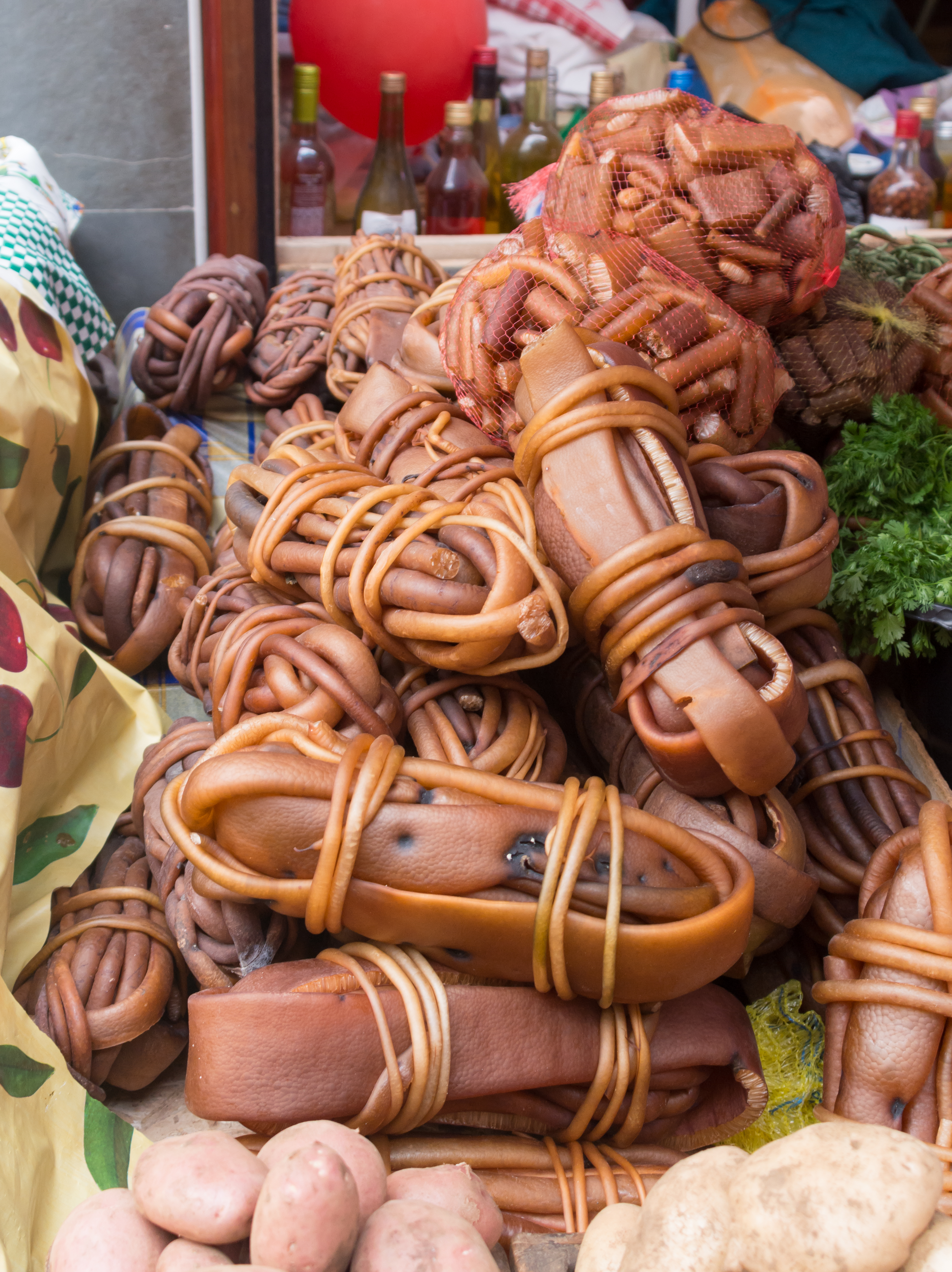

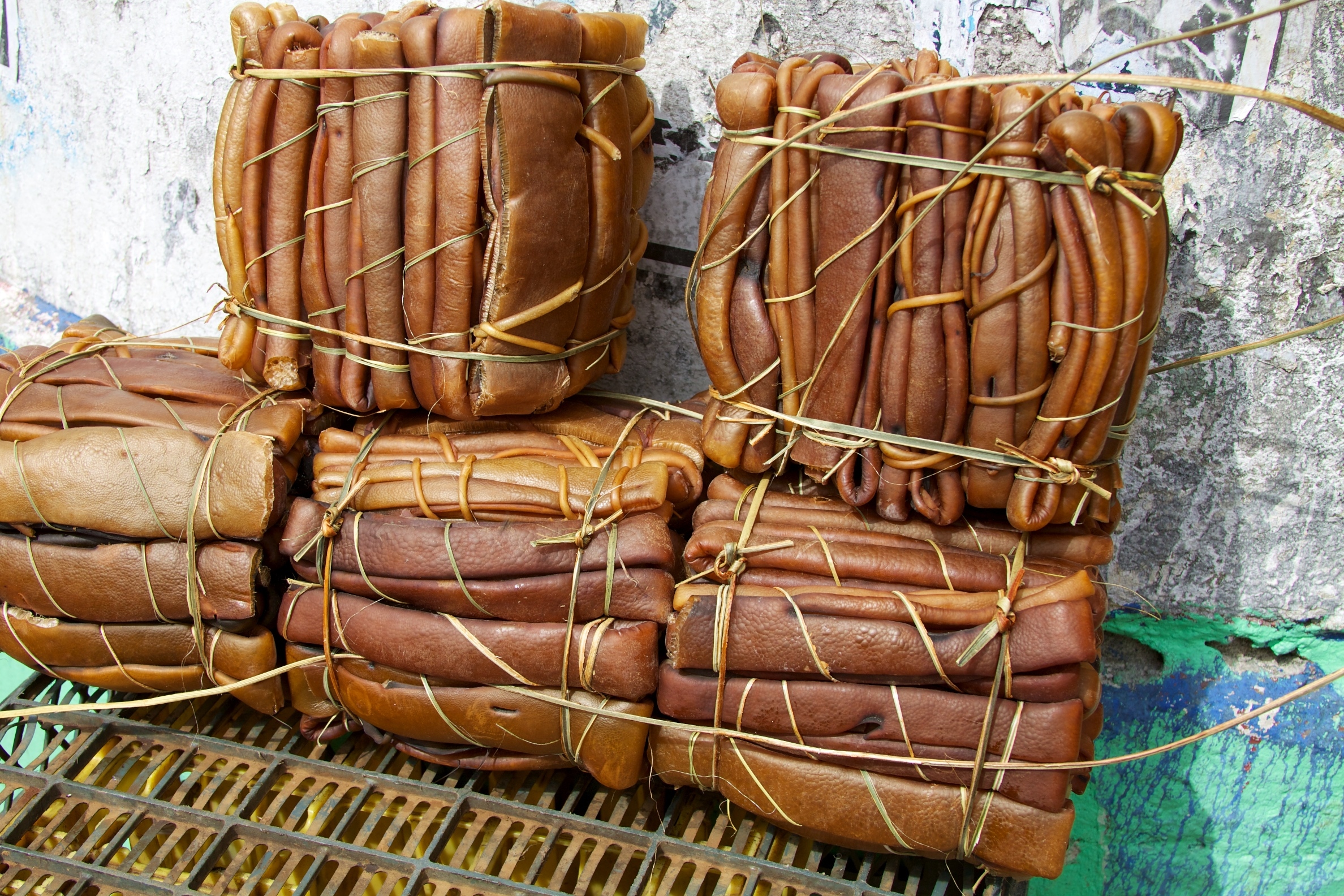

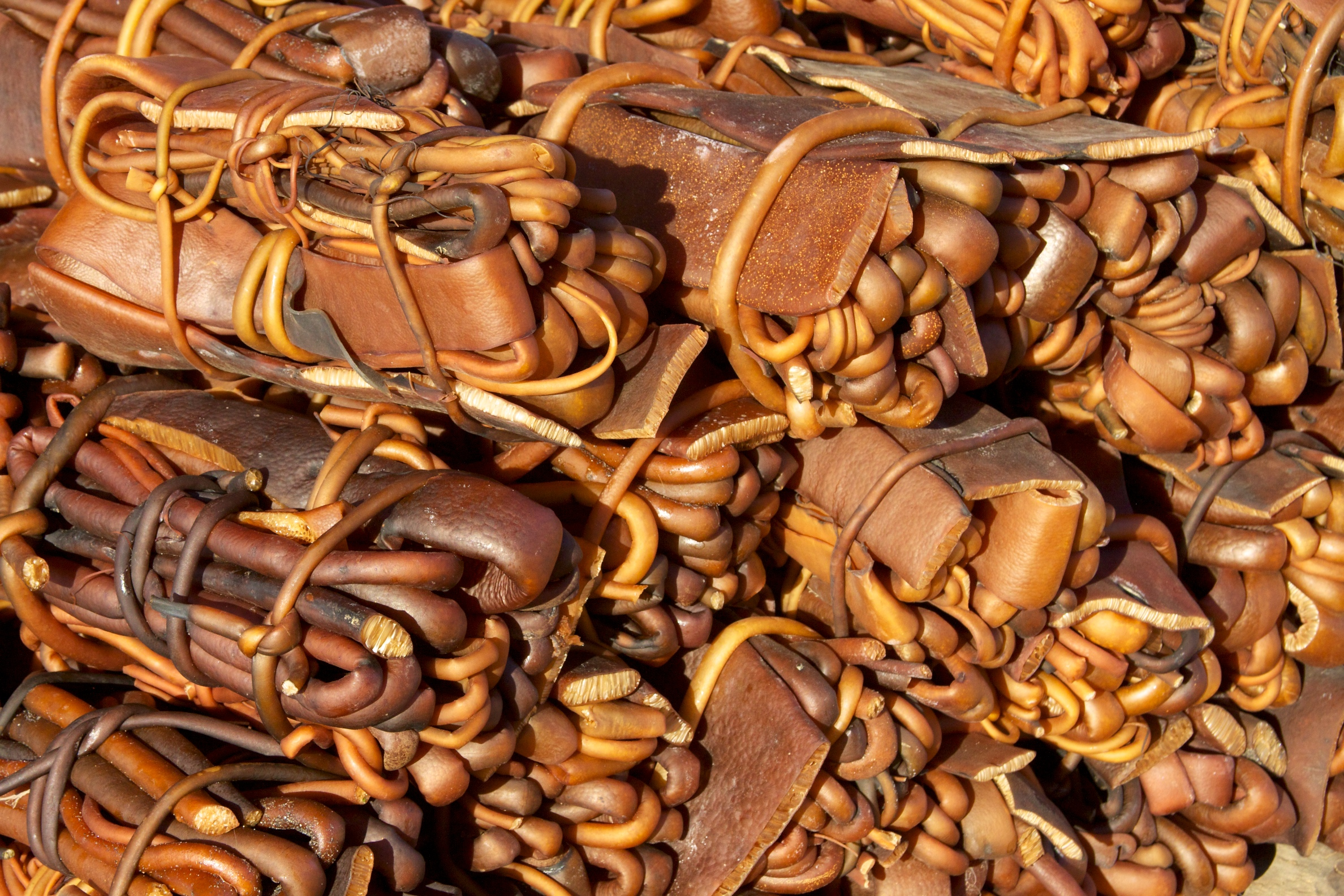

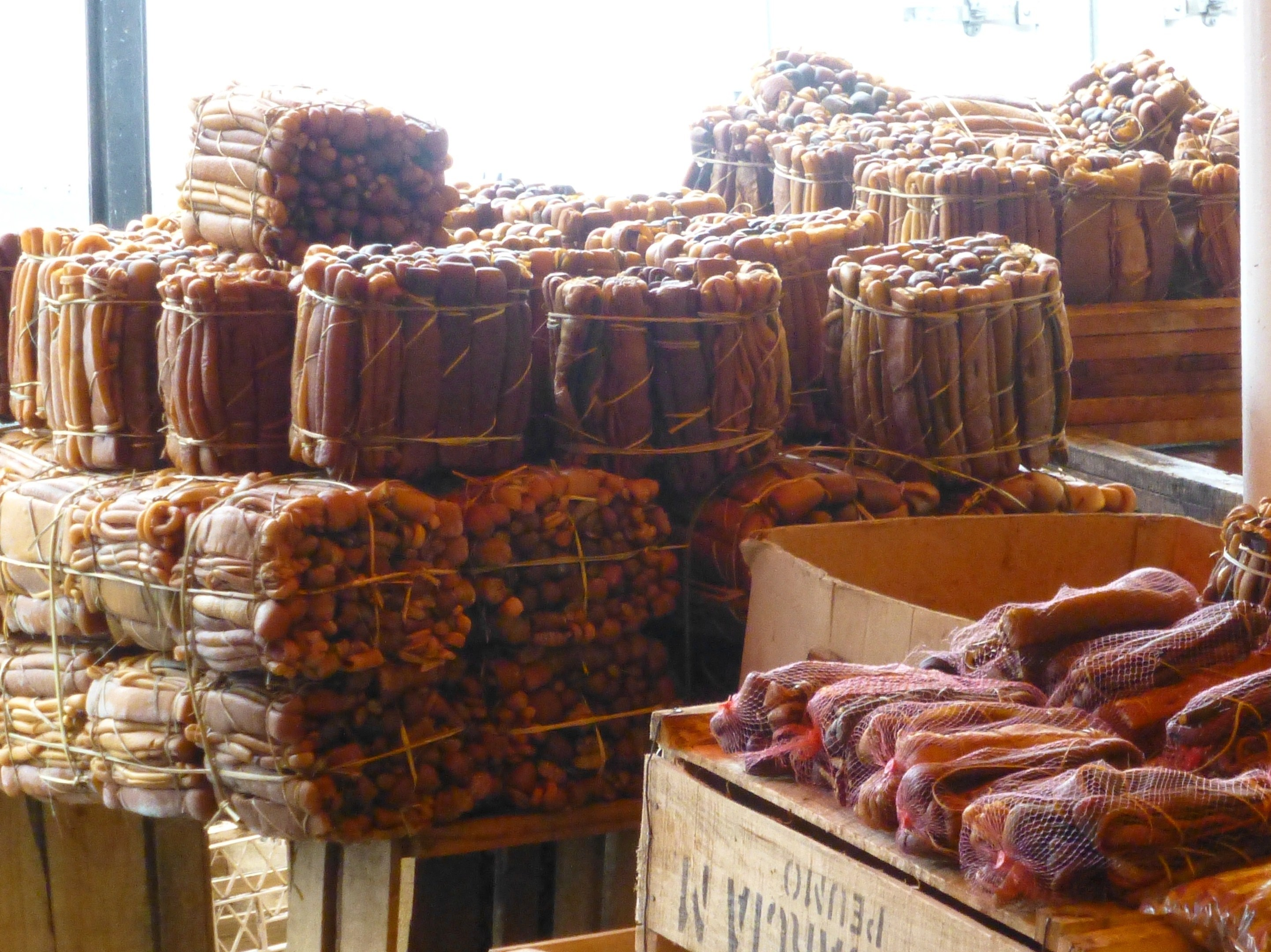

=== Māori and Moriori culture ===
Known as rimurapa in Māori, the plant is associated with the entrance to the underworld in many traditional stories. Blades of D. antarctica, along with D. poha, are used to make traditional pōhā bags, which are used to carry and store food and fresh water, to propagate live shellfish, and to make clothing and equipment for sports. Pōhā are especially associated with Ngāi Tahu and are often used to carry and store muttonbird (tītī) chicks.

D. antarctica was also used to create semi-submerged dingies called waka kōrari by Moriori of the Chatham Islands and Ngāi Tahu of the South Island, and it is a traditional Māori food source.
