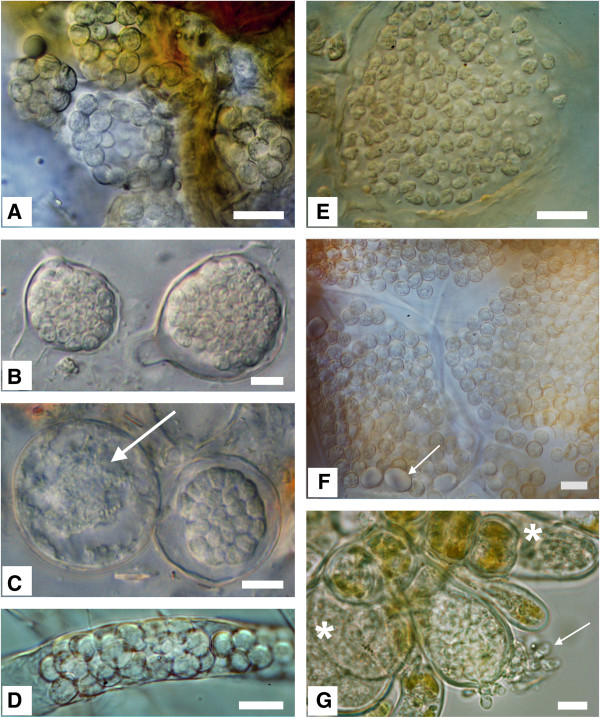
- E: Resting spores of Maullinia sp. resting spores in Durvillaea antarctica

Scientific classification
- Domain: Eukaryota
- Supergroup: Rhizaria
- Phylum: Cercozoa
- Subphylum: Endomyxa
- Class: Phytomyxea
- Order: Phagomyxida
- Family: Phagomyxidae
- Genus: Maullinia; I. Maier, E. R. Parodi, R. Wester-meier et D. G. Müller 2000

= Maullinia =

Genus of intracellular parasites

Maullinia is a genus of intracellular, phytomyxid parasites found across the Southern Hemisphere though primarily in Chile, The Prince Edward Islands, South Africa, Australia, and New Zealand. These parasites infiltrate the cells of their brown algal hosts via cytoplasmic extensions called plasmodia that divide synchronously, becoming increasingly multi-nucleate and engulfing the host cell organelles as they grow. Eventually, as the plasmodia fill the entire cell volume, the host cells become hypertrophied and grow to 3- 4x their original size, showing up as swollen appendages or galls on the host tissue at a macroscopic level. These swollen regions will burst alongside the mature Maullinia plasmodia, releasing biflagellated zoospores to the inter- and extracellular space to disperse the infection further. Zoospores can come from sporangial plasmodia, as in M. ectocarpii, or from resting spores, as in M. braseltonii.

As Maullinia can infect a wide range commercially important brown algal hosts, they present a significant threat to kelp farming and mariculture efforts. These infections could also cause significant harm on a global scale to natural populations, as they are able to disperse over long distances via rafting and tend to thrive in the cooler waters where kelp are often found.

== Etymology ==
"Maullinia" refers to the Maullín river near Puerto Montt in Chile, from which the genus was first described. The species epithet for M. ectocarpii was chosen in reference to the host organism genus, Ectocarpus. In M. braseltonii, the species epithet was chosen as a dedication to well-renowned phytomyxid specialist James P. Braselton.

== Type species ==
Maullinia ectocarpii I. Maier, E. R. Parodi, R. Westermeier et D. G. Müller sp. nov.

== History of knowledge ==
For decades, brown algal kelps across the southern hemisphere have been described as having gall-forming infections of unknown origin. The cause of these galls was first investigated purely by chance, when a team of researchers from the University of Konstanz, led by Dr. Ingo Maier, were conducting an epiphytic algal study in Chile. Some specimens of Ectocarpus siliculosus in a Chilean mariculture plantation appeared to have parasitic infections, which piqued the research team's interest. After extensive field and laboratory culture experimentation, a new genus of phytomyxid was described as Maullinia. This was the only phytomyxid parasite of brown algae known to science at the time, and was initially classified as a plasmodiophorid.

Close to a decade later, while investigating gall-forming infections on fronds of the kelp Durvillaea antarctica, researchers produced the first evidence of a second Maullinia species. Using 18S rRNA molecular data from the parasites causing these gall-forming infections, they constructed a phylogenetic tree which placed the parasite as a sister species to M. ectocarpii. However, not enough evidence was found to constitute a new species description at this time. A few years later, further molecular and morphological experimentation was carried out, providing enough evidence to classify this new Maullinia species as M. braseltonii.

== Ecology and habitat ==
=== Host interactions ===
The two species of Maullinia has been shown to successfully parasitize a wide range of brown algal hosts, spanning multiple brown algal orders, such as the Ectocarpales, Fucales, and Laminariales. A table of all known compatible hosts follows.

Host compatibility in M. ectocarpii and M. braseltonii
Orders	Host algal species	M. ectocarpii	M. braseltonii
Ectocarpales	Acinetospora crinita	compatible	-
Ectocarpales	Feldmannia simplex	compatible	-
Ectocarpales	Ectocarpus fasciculatus	compatible	-
Ectocarpales	Ectocarpus siliculosus	compatible	-
Ectocarpales	Hincksia hincksiae	compatible	-
Ectocarpales	Hincksia mitchelliae	compatible	-
Ectocarpales	Kuckuckia spinosa	compatible	-
Scytothamnales	Splachnidium rugosum	compatible	-
Desmarestiales	Desmarestia munda	compatible	-
Desmarestiales	Desmarestia distans	compatible	-
Laminariales	Macrocystis pyrifera	compatible	-
Fucales	Durvillaea amatheiae	compatible	-
Fucales	Durvillaea antarctica	-	compatible
Fucales	Durvillaea potatorum	compatible	-
Fucales	Durvillaea willana	-	compatible
Fucales	Durvillaea incurvata	-	compatible

==== Impact on hosts ====
Markers of Maullinia infection vary across host species, but all exhibit macroscopic signs of hypertrophy. In filamentous hosts (i.e., Ectocarpus), or hosts in gametophytic stages with microthalli (i.e., Macrocystis), swollen appendages can be found. These appendages are oblong to sub-spherical in shape, extending predominantly from the terminal cell on each main filament axis, but are also seen on the lateral branches. Appendages are unpigmented, with apical openings from which Maullinia zoospores are released. These appendages often occur in proximity to host sporangia, increasing the host's sterility rate and number of abortive sporangia.

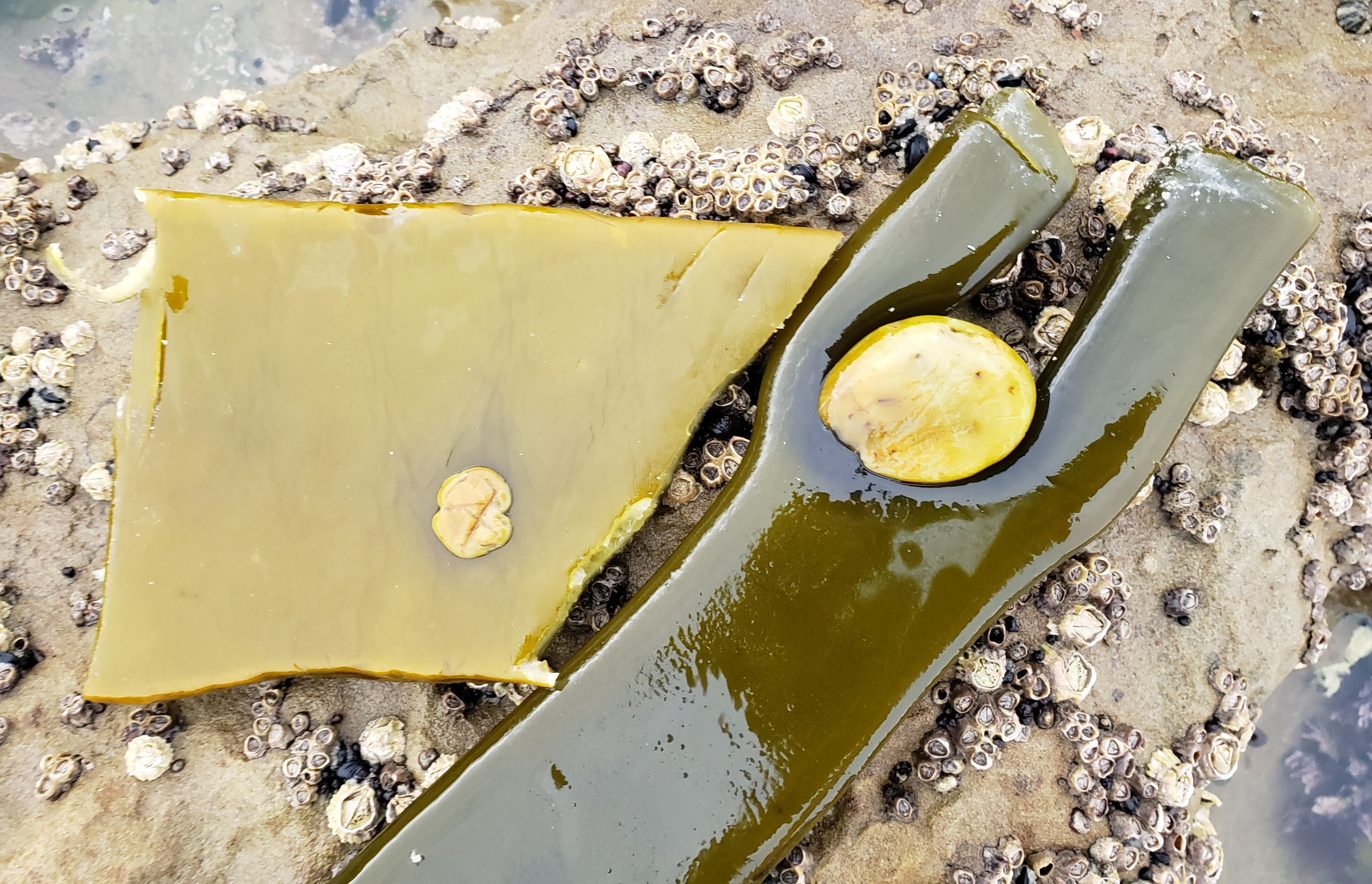
Yellow galls caused by Maullinia infections in two fronds southern bull kelp

In non-filamentous algae such as Durvillaea, infected during their mature sporophyte stages, large galls form on the fronds and stipe. These galls are irregular in shape, but most often are circular or ellipsoid with a diameter ranging from 0.5 cm to 7 cm. They are the result of cellular-level hypertrophy, which causes host cells to expand to be 3 – 4x their normal size. These hypertrophied cells are restricted to the sub-cortex, the region between the cortex and the medullary tissue. Hypertrophied cells and the resulting macroscopic galls are paler than healthy tissue, with galls generally having a yellow-brown colouration. They may be solitary or clustered together, but clusters generally indicate a greater extent of Maullinia infection. Individuals which wash ashore tend to have ruptured in areas with these clustered galls, indicating that galls weaken the thallus and make it more susceptible to external damage. There is also strong evidence that Maullinia, as a phytomyxid parasite, adversely affects the reproduction of its hosts.

Maullinia infections of non-filamentous brown algae primarily target adult hosts, and are mostly absent during their reproductive periods. During non-reproductive periods, when adults dominate the populations, an infection rate of up to 40% can be seen. In other words, up to 9 individuals per square meter could be infected.

These infections, regardless of whether the host is filamentous or non-filamentous, can increase viral infection rates as well. Maullinia infections do not appear to trigger significant defense mechanisms in their hosts, only passive protection from the presence of fungal endophytes, and as such provide a vector for viral infections to enter the brown alga alongside Maullinia.

==== Nutrition ====
As a parasitic genus, Maullinia derives its nutrition from the host cells it inhabits. Initially, the sole mode of nutrition was thought to be absorptive osmotrophy. In recent years however, new evidence has been revealed supporting intracellular phagotrophy as the primary mode of nutrition, with osmotrophy as a secondary function. Maullinia appears to engulf the host organelles whole as it extends through the cell, with a preference for plastids being clear. This preference could be due to several factors, namely active targeting by Maullinia, the widespread nature of plastids within brown algal cells, or simply a slower digestion process of these complex pigment-containing organelles. Evidence that there is some targeting of plastids comes from the host cell actively producing smaller plastids as the infection proceeds.

Outside of the plastid preference, one of the first intracellular structures to be engulfed is the large storage vacuole. This vacuole contains many complex polysaccharides, and as such its consumption provides the infecting Maullinia with a boost in energy. This energy boost near the beginning of the infection, alongside the loss of a key energy source for the host cell, allows Maullinia to expand quickly.

=== Distribution and habitat ===
Maullinia is found across much of the Southern Hemisphere, with infected brown algal populations in Chile, The Prince Edward Islands, South Africa, Australia, and New Zealand currently known. Within these regions Maullinia prevalence increases with latitude, becoming more dominant in southern populations as compared to more tropical ones. This is likely due to a combination of two key factors: the increased density of southern populations and increased Maullinia virulence in cooler waters. While many parasites prefer warmer environments, Maullinia appears to thrive in lower temperatures, having greatest infection rates during the winter months and at greater latitude.

The two species of Maullinia appear to have some preference for habitat, based on the brown algal hosts which they each primarily infect. M. ectocarpii prefers sandy, shallow, sheltered regions where more filamentous brown algae tend to thrive. However, M. ectocarpii is a more generalist species and can adapt to more rocky intertidal species such as Durvillaea amatheiae and Durvillaea potatorum. M. braseltonii is much more specialist, and exclusively infects Durvillaea hosts stemming from rocky intertidal habitats. As many Durvillaea species are buoyant, M. braseltonii is often found infecting drift as well.

The role of drift in distributing Maullinia and providing a vector for novel infections is critical. Rafting is the primary way by which new populations of brown algae are infected by Maullinia, and this process is supported by the physiological changes infected hosts undergo. With the hypertrophied cells forming galls, a greater buoyancy is achieved in infected individuals, allowing them a wider distribution capability. The likelihood of the mechanism is strengthened by the genetic evidence which links the New Zealand population of Maullinia to the Chile population. The role of rafting, alongside the widespread populations separated by thousands of kilometers, implies that Maullinia may be capable of achieving global distribution along cold-temperate coasts.

== Description ==
=== Life cycle ===
Life cycles in Maullinia are not completely understood, nor has sexual reproduction been observed. M. ectocarpii and M. braseltonii seem to produce two different forms of plasmodia which develop into unique structures and zoospores not yet observed in the other. Outside of these two plasmodial forms, the life cycle is largely identical.

==== Cysts ====
Encystment occurs when a Maullinia biflagellated stage settles on a compatible host, and can begin the infection process. Cysts are ellipsoid to kidney-shaped, being approximately 5.8 ± 0.7 μm long and 2.5 ± 0.2 μm wide. They have chitinous cell walls which break open at one end to allow the adhesorium, an infection apparatus, to extend. The adhesorium has no cell wall and develops from a beak-like shape into a narrow neck of 5 – 7 μm in length which punctures the host cell wall. From here, the cyst contents are injected into the host cell cytoplasm, and plasmodial formation begins.

==== Plasmodia ====
Once cyst contents have been injected into the host cytoplasm, synchronous nuclear divisions occur rapidly to produce large multinucleate plasmodia within the host cell. Each plasmodial nucleus is spherical and contains a distinct, centric nucleolus. Plasmodia continue to grow, via cruciform and non-cruciform mitotic divisions, engulfing host organelles and causing strong host cell hypertrophy. The host nucleus becomes engorged as a result of the hypertrophy, and eventually ceases division. This growth may alter the hosts metabolic functioning, collecting energy-rich compounds within the cell to help feed the Maullinia parasite, although this theory is not proven. After enough plasmodial growth occurs and the host cell is entirely filled, a lobose structure is adopted and plasmodial differentiation occurs.

==== Sporangia & sporangial zoospores (seen in M. ectocarpii) ====
Mature plasmodia transform into a single sporangium, which develops near the host cell wall and becomes attached to it via deposition of a fine, but dense, fibrillar wall-like material. The size and shape of these sporangia are variable both within and across host species, but on average are club-shaped, 40 – 93 μm long and 27–46 μm wide. In Ectocarpus, these sporangia occur in clusters that mirror the hosts' own growth pattern. Each sporangium produces several hundred zoospores.

Sporangia produce sporangial zoospores, pyriform cells 4.6 ± 0.7 μm long length, 2.3 ± 0.4 μm wide with thick walls and 2 flagella extending from the broad part of the cell. These flagella are of unequal length, with the longer flagellum being more posteriorly oriented and undulating, while the shorter one is more anteriorly oriented and oblique to the midline. Both flagella have short hair tips along them. Sporangial zoospore nuclei have an abundance of condensed chromatin, but no nucleoli. These zoospores are extremely motile and exit singly from a single apical opening on the sporangium. Once released, they disperse and make contact with hosts to begin encystment again.

==== Resting spores (seen in M. braseltonii) ====
Resting spores allow for survival in antagonistic environments, which allows M. braseltonii to be more specific about which hosts it chooses to infect as a host cell is not needed for resting spore survival. The plasmodium begins resting spore development by concentrating cytoplasm around the nucleus, allowing the thick, 3-layered wall to start forming. Initially, these resting spores are very irregular and globose to elliptic, but become more regularly spherical as they mature. They have no colour, and will wait to release zoospores until conditions are optimal. These zoospores may be differently structured than their sporangial counterparts, but they have yet to be observed.

== Practical importance ==
Maullinia has hosts of high commercial importance, such as Macrocystis, and as such have the potential of causing devastating effects if an infection were able to spread into a gametophyte mariculture supporting a Macrocystis kelp farm. Examples have been seen already, with the initial description of Maullinia occurring on an infected Chilean Ectocarpus mariculture. These kinds of infections could compound with the delivery of brown algal viruses alongside the parasite, decimating entire kelp cultures in the process.

In addition to its known effects on brown algal hosts, Maullinia has the ability to infect a wide range of hosts that could possibly bridge the marine-terrestrial gap. Phytomyxid parasites have been proven capable of shifting hosts across kingdoms (i.e., from brown algae to angiosperms), and could this introduce completely novel parasites to terrestrial environments.

== Species ==
- Maullinia ectocarpii I. Maier, E. R. Parodi, R. Westermeier et D. G. Müller 2000
- Maullinia braseltonii P. Murúa, F. Goecke et S. Neuhauser 2017
