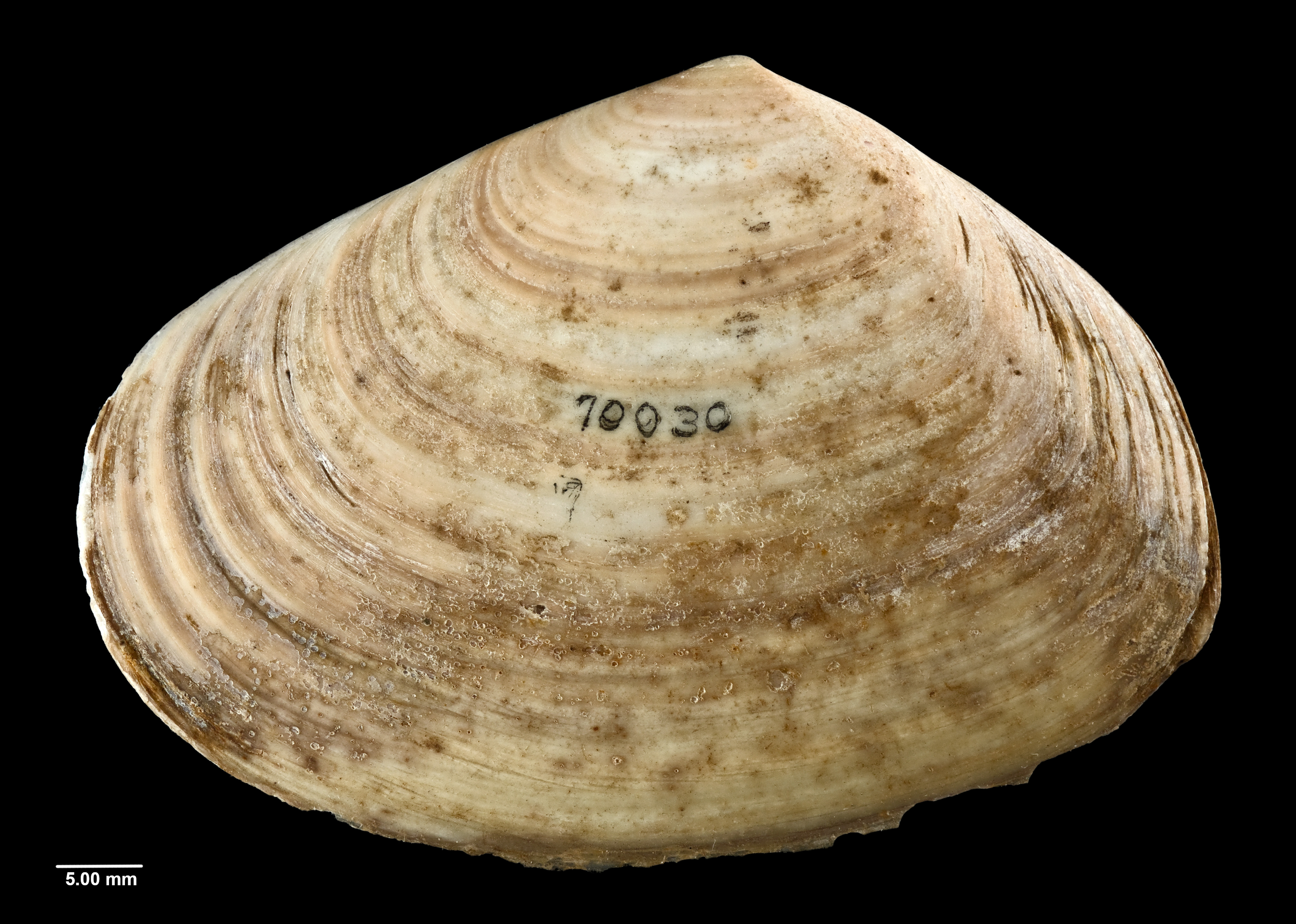
- Paphies donacina (Spengler, 1793)

Scientific classification
- Kingdom: Animalia
- Phylum: Mollusca
- Class: Bivalvia
- Order: Venerida
- Superfamily: Mactroidea
- Family: Mesodesmatidae
- Genus: Paphies; Lesson, 1830

Species
- See text.

= Paphies =

Genus of bivalves

Paphies is a genus of large, edible saltwater clams, marine bivalve molluscs in the family Mesodesmatidae. The genus is endemic to New Zealand. The species include the pipi (P. australis), tuatua (P. subtriangulata) and toheroa (P. ventricosa).

== Species ==
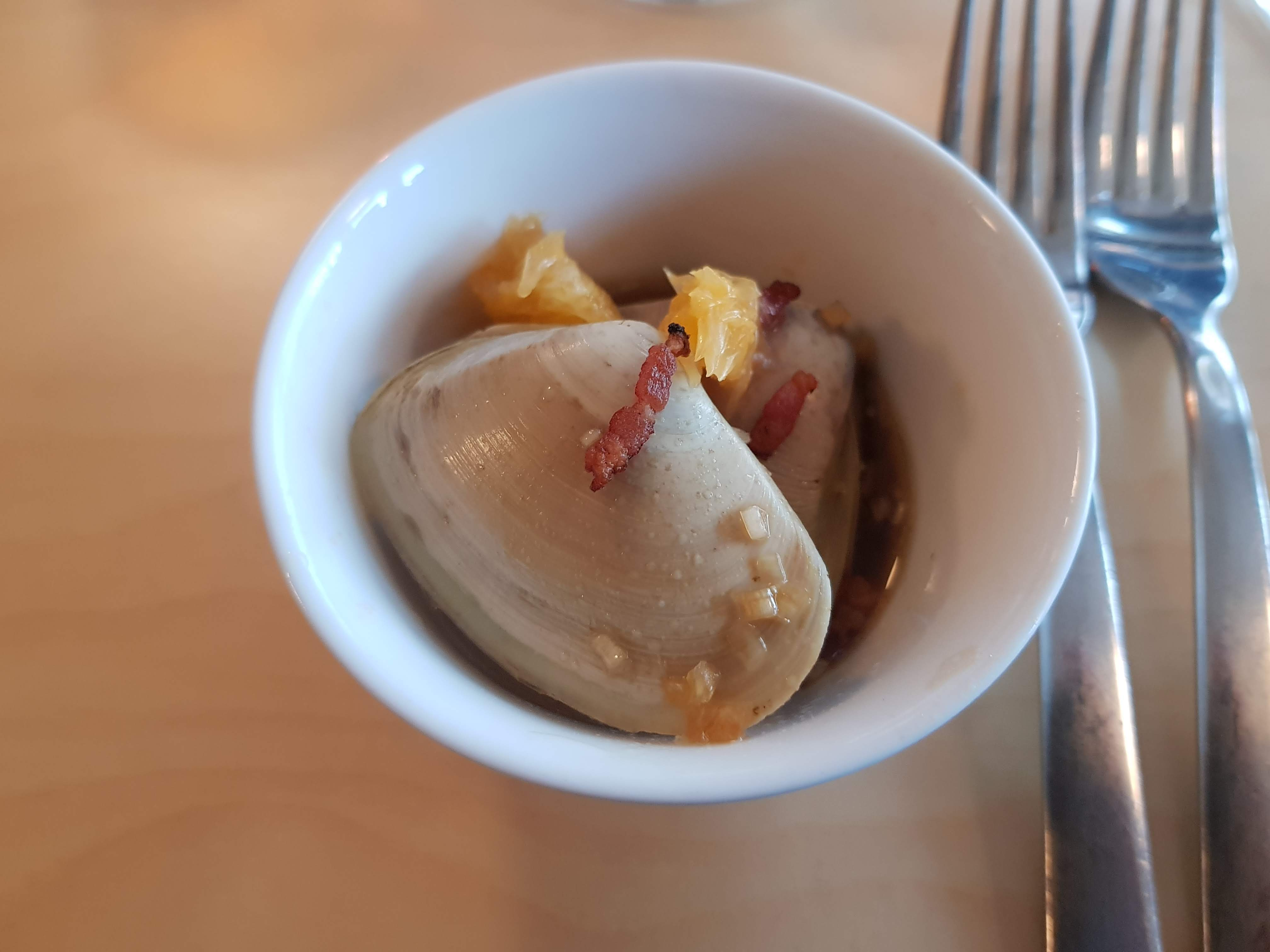
Paphies donacina dish

- Paphies australis (Gmelin, 1790)
- Paphies donacina (Spengler, 1793)
- Paphies subtriangulata (Wood, 1828)
  - Paphies subtriangulata porrecta (Marwick, 1928)
  - Paphies subtriangulata quoyii (Deshayes, 1832)
  - Paphies subtriangulata subtriangulata (Wood, 1828)
- Paphies ventricosa (Gray, 1843)
