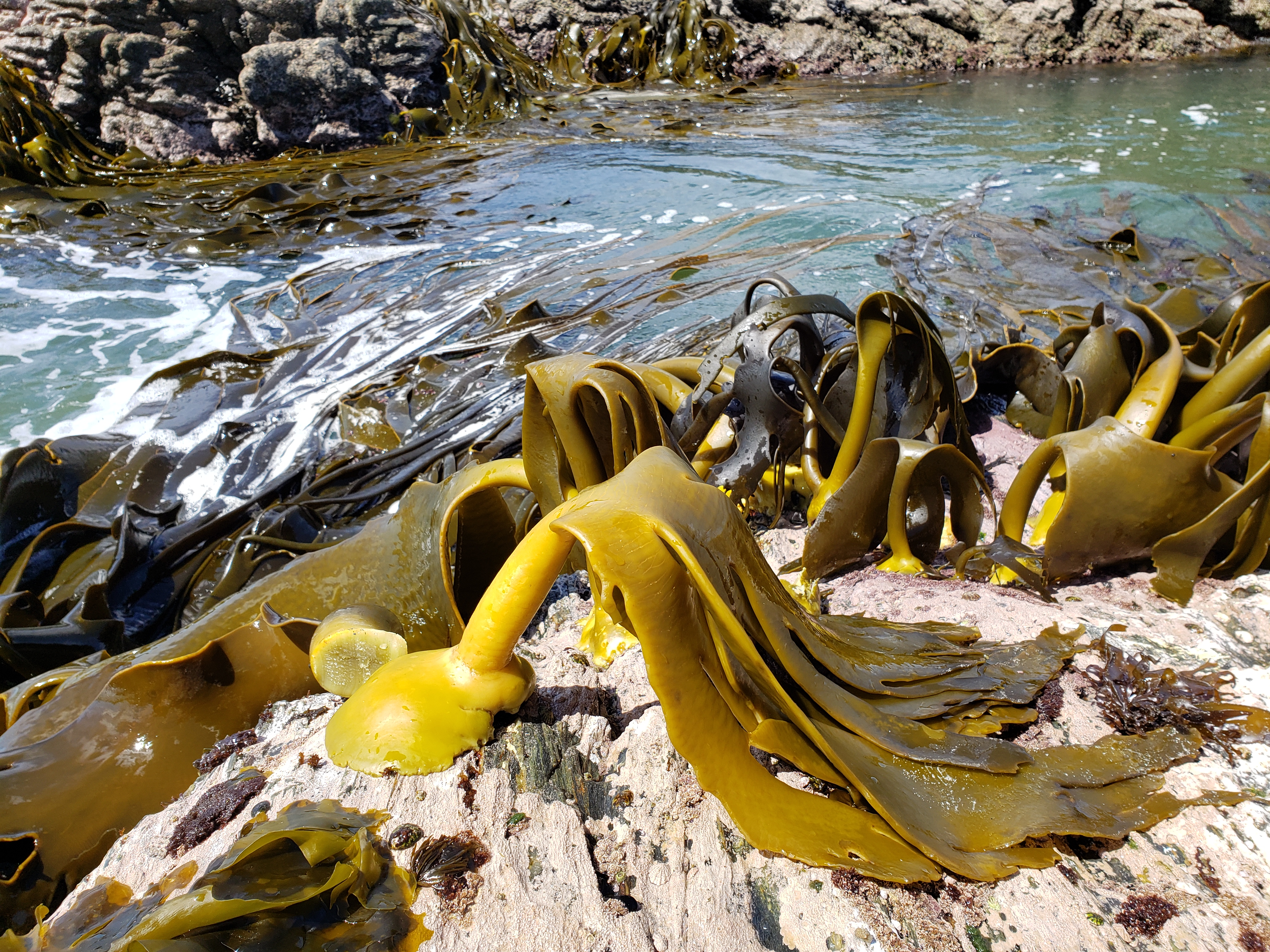
- Durvillaea poha in foreground (with D. willana below) at Brighton Beach, Otago

Scientific classification
- Domain: Eukaryota
- Clade: Sar
- Clade: Stramenopiles
- Phylum: Ochrophyta
- Class: Phaeophyceae
- Order: Fucales
- Family: Durvillaeaceae
- Genus: Durvillaea
- Species: D. poha

Binomial name
- Durvillaea poha C.I. Fraser, H.G. Spencer & J.M. Waters, 2012

= Durvillaea poha =

Species of seaweed

Durvillaea poha is a large, robust species of southern bull kelp found in New Zealand. Common in the waters of the South Island, the species can be recognised due to its broader, flatter blades.

== Description ==
The species has wide, air filled blades with a 'honeycomb' structure, and relative stout, pale or orange stipes. The stipes are unbranched. It can be distinguished from Durvillaea antarctica due to its broader, flatter blades.

Images of Durvillaea poha
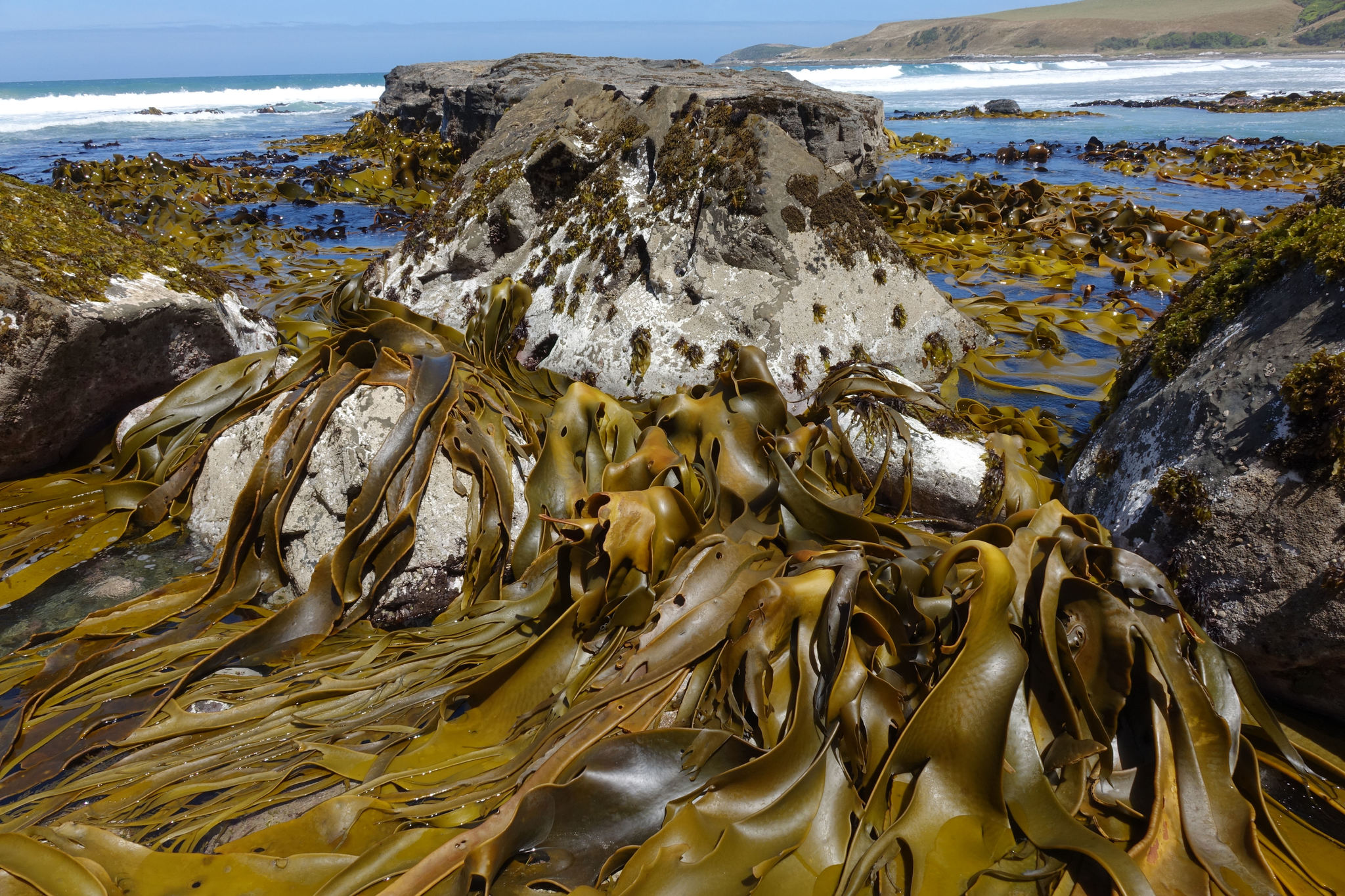
D. poha at Pūrākanui Bay, Otago

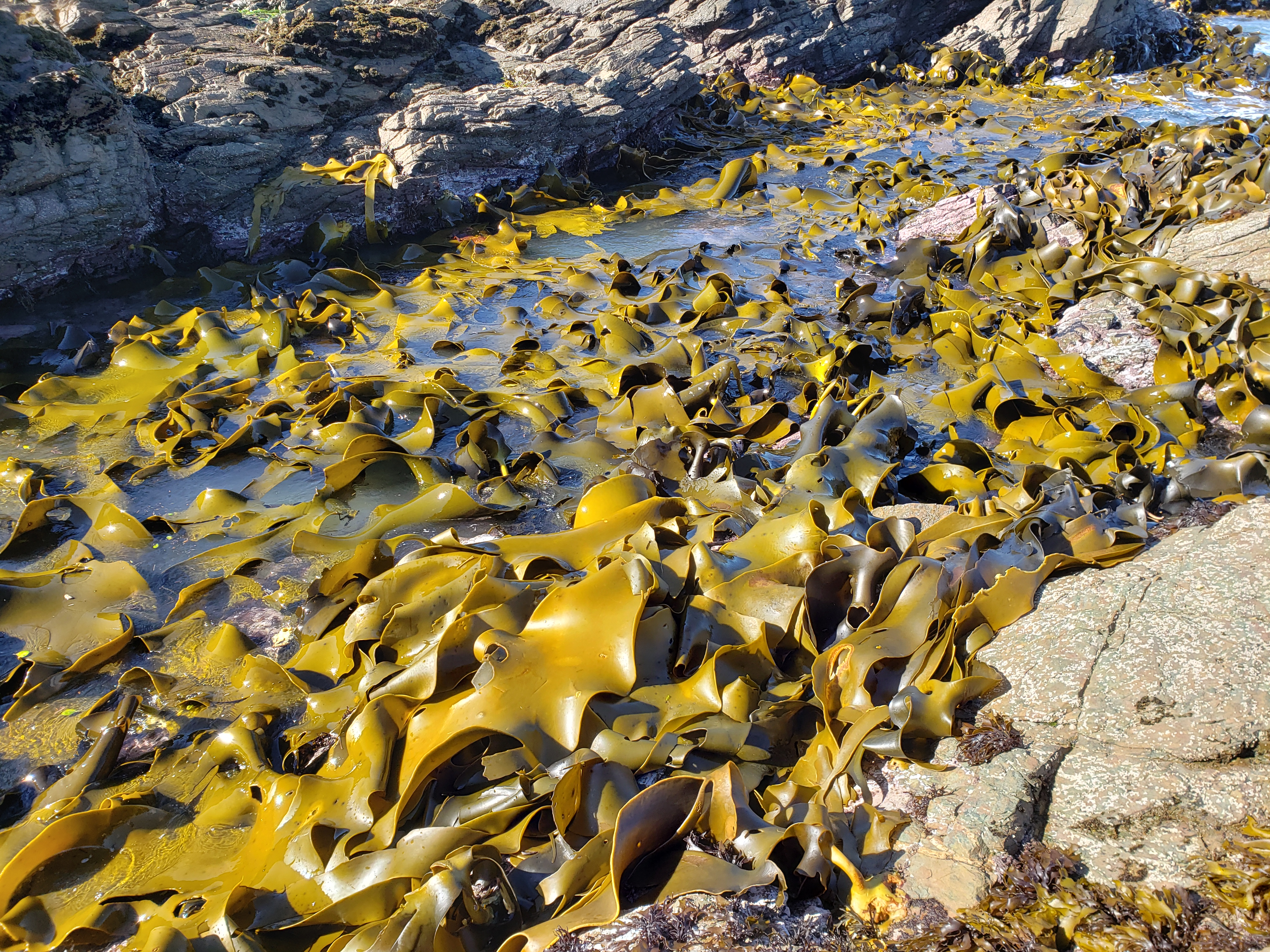
D. poha growing on Taieri Island, Otago

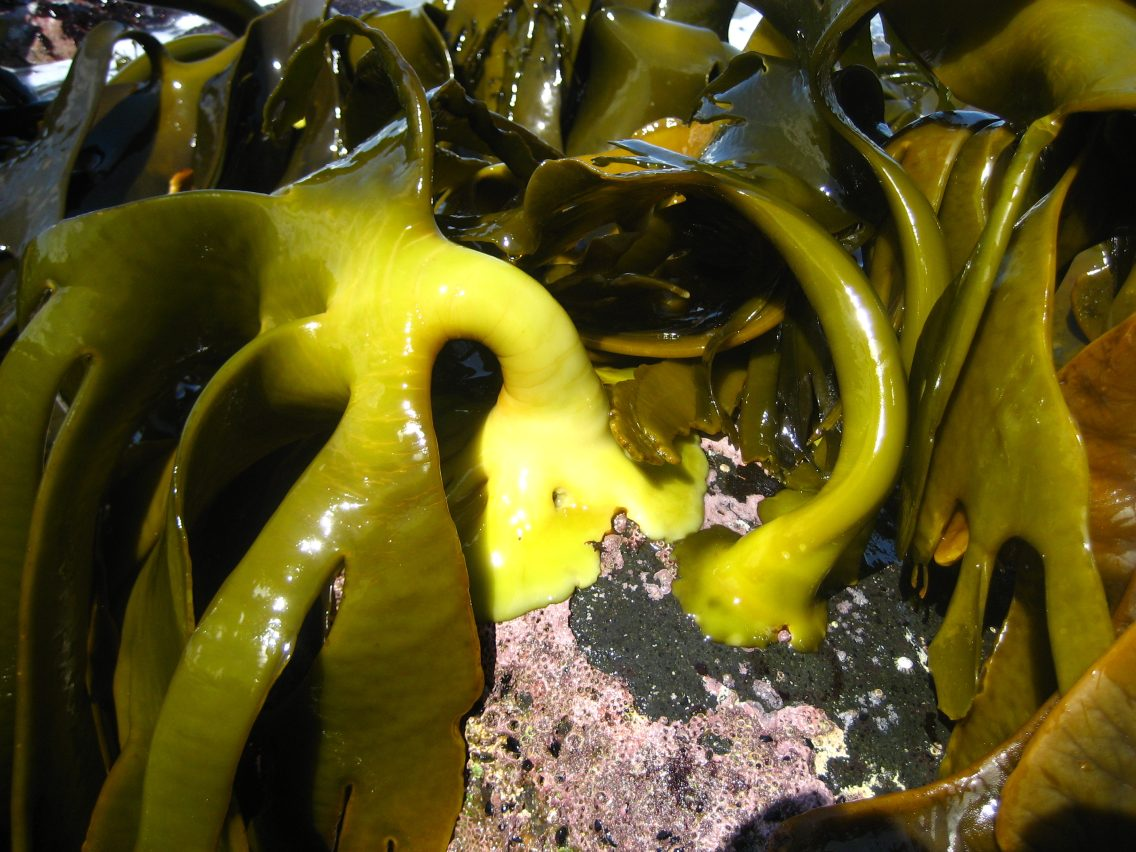
Stipes of D. poha at Second Bay, Otago

== Taxonomy ==
The species was previously classified as the "cape" lineage of Durvillaea antarctica but in 2012 it was recognised as a distinct species due to consistent genetic, morphological and ecological differences. In southern New Zealand, D. poha and D. antarctica frequently grow next to one another, although D. poha normally grows higher up or further back on rock platforms, or in more sheltered bays, where wave force is weaker. D. poha generally has wider fronds than D. antarctica, and can appear more 'orange' across the frond area. Mitochondrial introgression has been observed between the two species, where some plants in Wellington exhibited the nuclear DNA of D. poha but also mitochondrial DNA belonging to D. antarctica.

== Etymology ==
The specific epithet is from pōhā, storage bags made by Māori out of kelp fronds.

== Distribution ==
The species is endemic to New Zealand, and is predominantly found along southern coasts of the South Island and on Stewart Island, as well as on the subantarctic Snares and Auckland Islands. Based on genetic data, the species appears to have undergone a recent range expansion into the North Island, as it can be found at low frequencies along the Wellington coastline. This range expansion coincides with areas affected by tectonic uplift and landslides caused by historic earthquakes, including the 1855 Wairarapa earthquake. The removal of D. antarctica and formation of new coastline by such tectonic disturbance likely provided an ecological opportunity for D. poha to successfully colonise coastline north of the Cook Strait.

== Human use ==
=== Māori culture ===
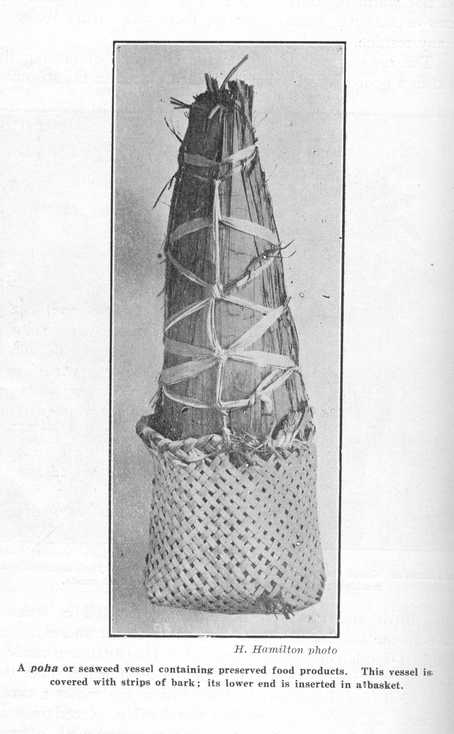
A pōhā covered with tōtara bark and inserted into a flax basket

Along with D. antarctica, blades of D. poha are used to make traditional pōhā bags, which are used to carry and store food and fresh water, to propagate live shellfish, and to make clothing and equipment for sports. Pōhā bags are especially associated with the Ngāi Tahu people (iwi), and are often used to carry and store muttonbird (tītī) chicks.
