= Pōhā =

Traditional Māori bags made of kelp

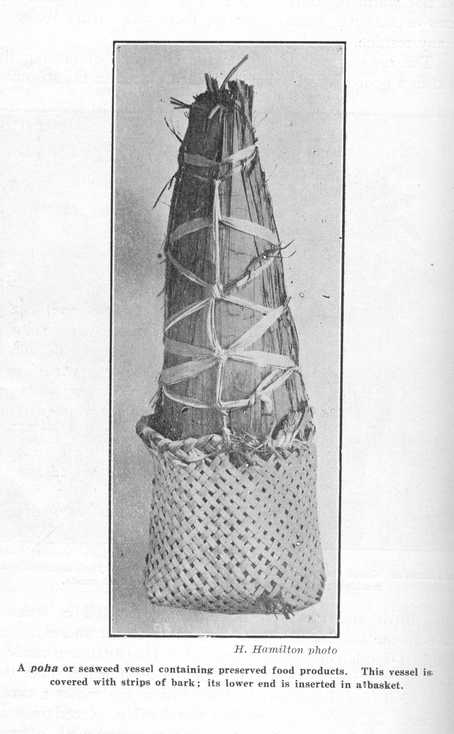
A pōhā covered with tōtara bark and inserted into a flax basket.

Pōhā are traditional bags used by the Māori people of New Zealand made from southern bull kelp, which are used to carry and store food and fresh water, to propagate live shellfish, and to make clothing and equipment for sports. Pōhā are especially associated with Ngāi Tahu, who have legally recognised rights for harvesting source species of kelp.

== Construction ==
Blades from southern bull kelp (rimurapa in Māori) species such as Durvillaea antarctica and D. poha (named after the pōhā) were used to construct the bags. The kelp blades have a 'honeycomb' structure, which allows them to be split open, hollowed out (pōhā hau) and inflated into containers. Inflated blades are hung out to dry and then deflated and rolled up for transport. Tōtara bark can be used to cover and protect the bags.

== Uses ==
=== Transport ===
Pōhā are used to transport food and fresh water, to enclose food within an oven, and to transport and propagate live seafood such as shellfish (including toheroa), sea stars and pāua in a process referred to as whakawhiti kaimoana. Pōhā were often used to carry and store muttonbird (tītī) chicks. Pōhā form an airtight seal and food can be safely stored inside them for up to two or three years.

=== Clothing and sport ===
Members of Ngāi Tahu used inflated pōhā to protect their bodies (like a wetsuit) while foraging for seafood, and stories by iwi indicate that pōhā were used for surfing in a sport called kauai or kaukau.
