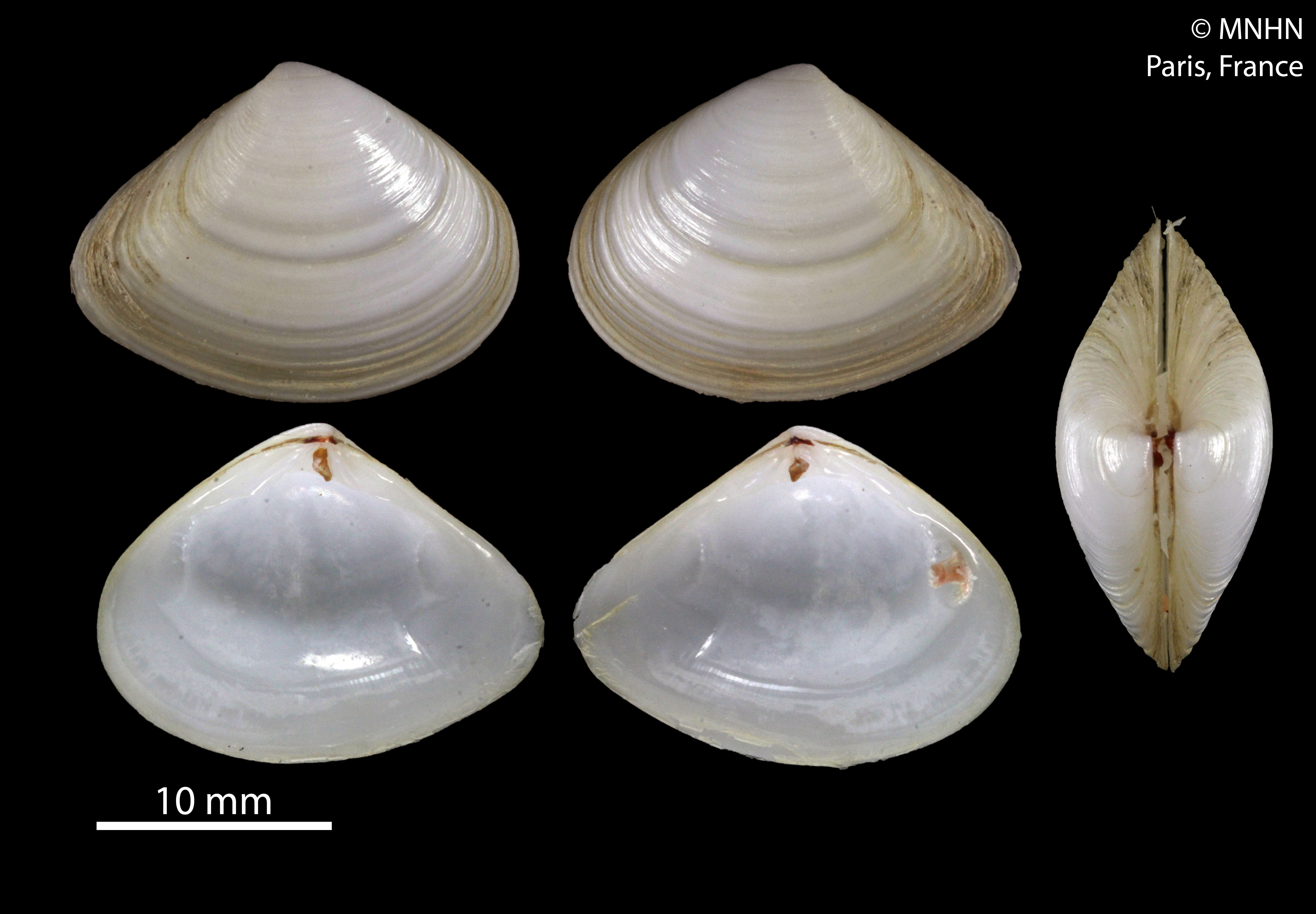
- Atactodea striata (specimen at MNHN, Paris)

Scientific classification
- Kingdom: Animalia
- Phylum: Mollusca
- Class: Bivalvia
- Order: Venerida
- Superfamily: Mactroidea
- Family: Mesodesmatidae; Gray, 1839

Genera
- See text.

= Mesodesmatidae =

Family of bivalves

Mesodesmatidae is a family of saltwater clams, marine bivalve mollusks in the order Venerida.

== Genera ==
- Amarilladesma M. Huber, 2010
- Anapella Dall, 1895
- Atactodea Dall, 1895
- Coecella Gray, 1853
- Davila Gray, 1853
- Donacilla Philippi, 1836
- Mesodesma Deshayes, 1832
- Monterosatus : synonym of Planktomya Simroth, 1896
- Paphies Lesson, 1830
- Regterenia Rooij-Schuiling, 1972
- Soleilletia Bourguignat, 1885
