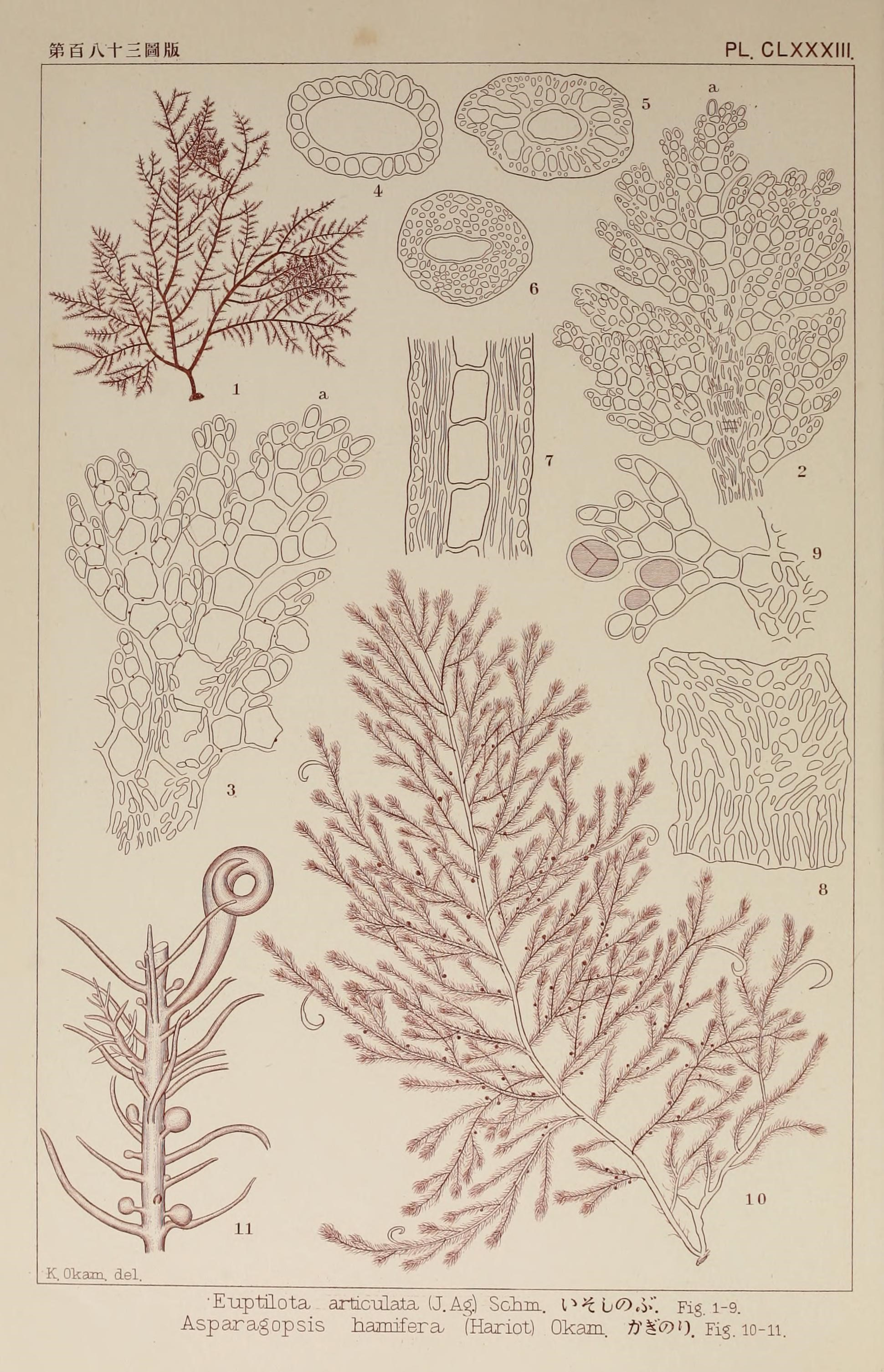
- Bonnemaisonia hamifera, figures 10 and 11

Scientific classification
- Domain: Eukaryota
- Clade: Archaeplastida
- Division: Rhodophyta
- Class: Florideophyceae
- Order: Bonnemaisoniales
- Family: Bonnemaisoniaceae
- Genus: Bonnemaisonia
- Species: B. hamifera

Binomial name
- Bonnemaisonia hamifera Har.

Synonyms
- Asparagopsis hamifera (Hariot) Okamura, 1921; Bonnemaisonia intricata (C.Agardh) P.C.Silva, 1957; Boryna intricata (C.Agardh) Bory de Saint-Vincent, 1826; Ceramium intricatum C.Agardh, 1824; Herpothamnion intricatum (C.Agardh) Nägeli, 1862; Trailliella intricata Batters, 1896

= Bonnemaisonia hamifera =

Species of alga

Bonnemaisonia hamifera is a species of red alga in the family Bonnemaisoniaceae. Originally from the Pacific Ocean, it has been introduced into the northeastern Atlantic Ocean, where it is considered invasive on European coasts. It exists in two phases which, at one time, were thought to be different species; a medium-sized feathery form attached to other seaweeds, and a small tufted form known as Trailliella.

== Description ==
This algal species exists in two phases. The gametangial phase is always epiphytic, growing on Cystoseira and other algae. It forms erect, brownish-red, feathery fronds and grows to a length of up to 35 cm (14 in). The fronds are flattened and bear crozier-shaped hooks which cling on to and get tangled with the host seaweed. The tetrasporangial phase forms much-branched, brownish-red tufts of fine filaments growing in small clumps with a width of 2.5 cm (1 in) and resembling cotton wool. They are epiphytic on coralline algae or occasionally grow direct on rock or other hard substrate. The red colour of this species comes from the presence of the pigments phycoerythrin and phycocyanin which mask the chlorophyll a, beta-Carotene and various xanthophylls which are also present.

== Distribution ==
B. hamifera is native to the northwestern Pacific Ocean and the coasts around Japan. It was introduced into the northeastern Atlantic Ocean in the late nineteenth century, possibly arriving on the hull of a ship or among shellfish. It is now present from Iceland and northern Norway southward to Portugal, as well as in the Canary Islands, Algeria, Tunisia and the Adriatic Sea. It was first noticed in Britain, on the coast of Dorset in 1890, when the form "Trailliella" was collected. The first record in Ireland was in A. D. Cotton's 1915 survey of the marine algae of Clare Island, County Mayo. The first record in Northern Ireland was in 1972 from Sandeel Bay. It grows in the low intertidal zone and to depths of about 8 m (26 ft) and can be abundant in lagoon-like areas on the lower shore.

== Life cycle ==
This seaweed displays a complex life cycle with an alternation of generations between the gametophytes and the tetrasporophytes. In the spring, gametophytes occur. The sperm produced is not motile and relies on currents to bring it to the female reproductive structures. Fertilisation results in the production of carposporophytes, which in turn produce carpospores which develop into the original tetrasporophytes. The tetrasporophyte occurs throughout the year, but is most common between October and March. It was at one time thought to be a different species and was given the name Trailliella intricata. Vegetative reproduction is uncommon, but asexual reproduction occurs as a result of fragmentation of the thallus.
