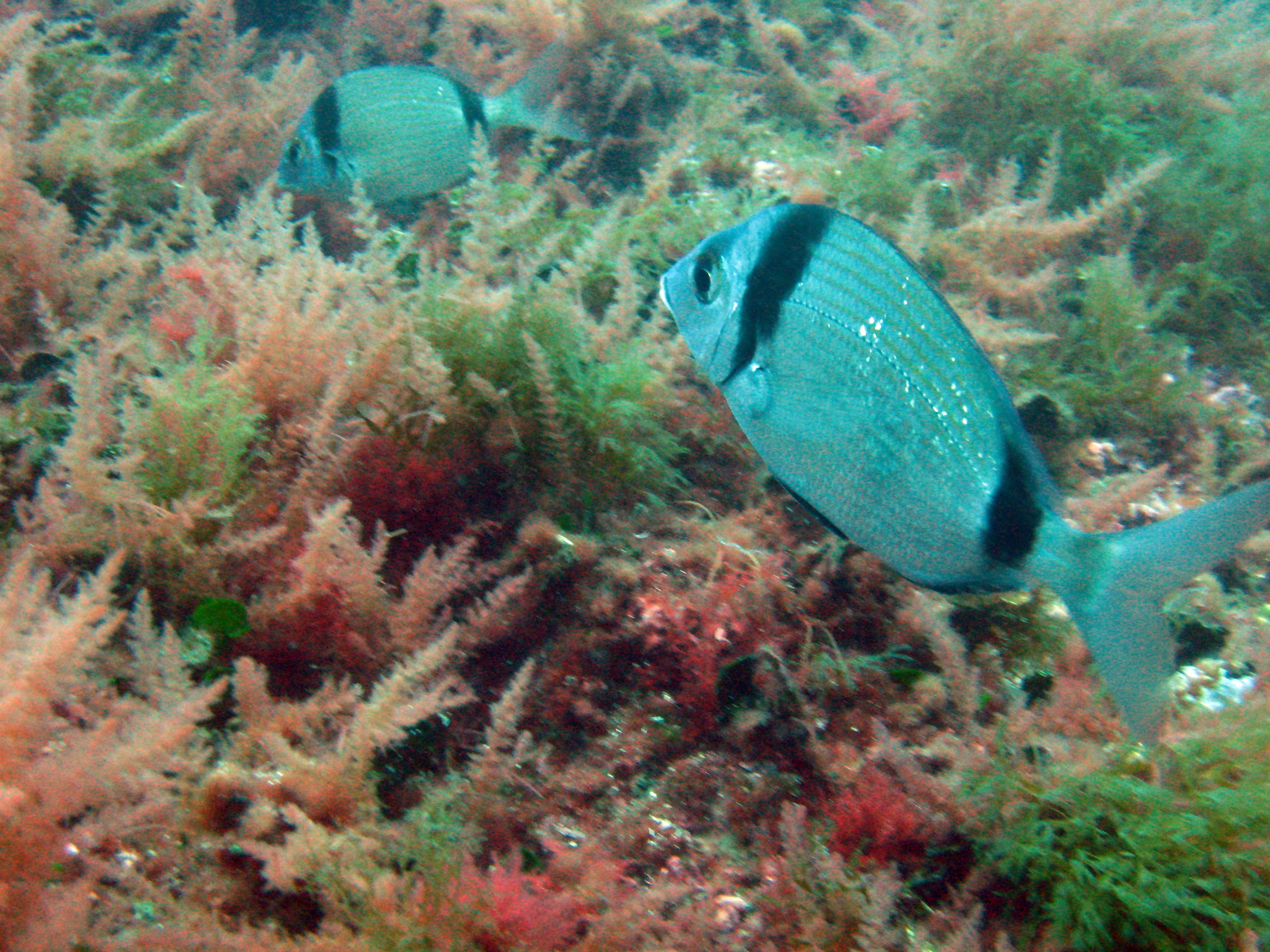
- (Diplodus vulgaris). In the background, Asparagopsis armata

Scientific classification
- Domain: Eukaryota
- Clade: Archaeplastida
- Division: Rhodophyta
- Class: Florideophyceae
- Order: Bonnemaisoniales
- Family: Bonnemaisoniaceae
- Genus: Asparagopsis
- Species: A. armata

Binomial name
- Asparagopsis armata Harvey

Synonyms
- Falkenbergia rufolanosa

= Asparagopsis armata =

Species of alga

Asparagopsis armata is a species of marine red algae, in the family Bonnemaisoniaceae. English name(s) include red harpoon weed. They are multicellular eukaryotic organisms. This species was first described in 1855 by Harvey, an Irish botanist who found the algae on the Western Australian coast. A. armata usually develops on infralittoral rocky bottoms around the seawater surface to around 40m of depth. Marine algae like A. armata are considered "autogenic ecosystem engineers" as they are at the very bottom of the food chain and control resource availability to other organisms in the ecosystem.

== Population distribution ==
A. armata is a species native to southern Australia and New Zealand (Southern hemisphere) and is thought to have slowly spread to the Northern hemisphere through the Mediterranean sea, as it is highly invasive. It can now also be found along the British Isles to Senegal as well. The first Mediterranean A. armata was reported in Algeria in 1923. When first found, it was considered abnormal to find A. armata in this location due to the high summer seawater surface temperatures along southern Mediterranean coasts. However, it was later found that the particular cool water temperatures that stay below 25 °C would allow the species to survive locally during the summer.

== Morphology ==
The fully grown A. armata has sparse branches on which long stolons with harpoon-like hooks and erect shoots develop in all directions. The branches, stolons, and shoots ramify over and over again which give A. armata the thallus-like appearance. The ultimate branchlets are filamentous and composed of three cell rows whereas the larger branches consist of a central medullary filament and a gelatinous matrix surrounded by a cortex 3 – 6 cells thick. Gametophytes are terete and are around 200 mm in height. They form dense, pink intertwining clumps. A characteristic feature of this species is barbs, which attach the A. armata to the ocean benthic substrates.

== Life cycle ==
A. armata has a triphasic diplohaplontic heteromorphic life cycle. In this cycle, the three phases include: haploid carposporophyte, gametophyte and diploid zygote. Multiple phases of different morphology and ploidy contribute differently to the expansion potential of A. armata. Gametophytes of this species are microscopic carposoporophytes, which divide into tetrasporophytes that go through meiosis to be developed into the gametophyte.

A. armata has two morphologically different stages of development– the gametophyte stage and the tetrasporophyte stage.

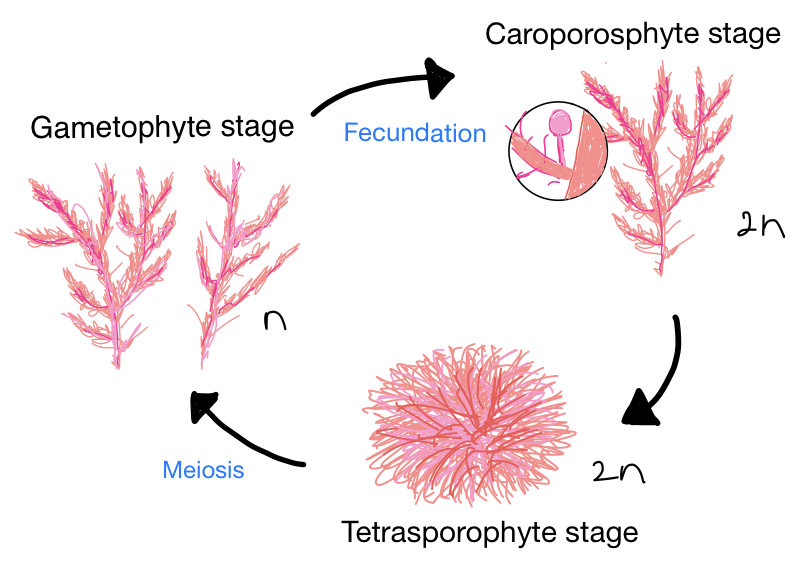

A. armata goes through haploid and gametophytic phases in a heteromorphic diplo-haplontic life cycle. The A. armata gametophyte grows into adult form and goes through fecundation to produce diploid carposporophyte; which, then, divide into tetrasporophyte that goes through meiosis to be developed into the gametophyte.

== Impact of A. armata as an invasive species ==
The acceleration of marine biological invasions through increasing trade and travel also caused the transportation of A. armata to areas outside of their native range in the Southern hemisphere. Once it is established, A. armata could rapidly spread and dominate the invaded environment without the direct intervention of human activity. A. armata releases large amounts of toxic compounds to gain competitive advantage in the surrounding invaded area. The impairment of invertebrates after exposure to this algal exudate is shown by significantly increased lipid (and other biochemical biomarkers) content in the organisms such as common prawn and marine snail. The critical impact that the exudate of A. armata causes, via secondary metabolites, severely decreases the survival rate of various species in the rock pool native communities.

== Halogenated metabolites ==
As a defense mechanism against its predators, A. armata produce halogenated metabolites that chase away herbivores and prevent biofouling. These halogenated metabolites are stored as a refractile inclusion inside specialized gland cells, and are activated with Bromine.

Gland cells of A. armata can take up to 10% of the algal volume, which is a large portion of the plant. Gland cell walls are thin in order to help the transfer of metabolites to the structures that connect the gland cells to the pericentral cells. These structures are stalk-like and allow the metabolite to move to the algae's surface.

== Methane emissions reduction in ruminants ==
In 2019, following laboratory studies on the effectiveness of Asparagopsis taxiformis in reducing ruminants' enteric methane emissions, a team from the University of California, Davis, demonstrated that a 1% inclusion of Asparagopsis armata in lactating dairy cows' feed resulted in a 67.2% decrease in methane produced.

In 2021, CH4 Global became the first company in the world to be licensed by intellectual property holders FutureFeed to use Asparagopsis in livestock feed, with the aim of significantly reducing enteric methane emissions in ruminants. These licences enable CH4 Global to make methane reduction claims about the Asparagopsis in their product formulations in the New Zealand and Australian markets, where the company has research and production facilities. A. armata is the dominant species of Asparagopsis in New Zealand. CH4 Global worked with New Zealand's National Institute of Water and Atmospheric Research (NIWA) to close the life cycle of the seaweed, which they accomplished in June of the same year, enabling large quantities of the seaweed to be aquafarmed. CH4 Global has since pulled out of New Zealand and is operating in Australia. Asparagopsis Technologies is now operating out of the site in Ocean Beach, Bluff which was previously built and operated by CH4 global.

Sea Forest, based in Tasmania, Australia, and also a FutureFeed licensee, has chosen to focus exclusively on A. armata, and has worked with scientists at James Cook University, University of Tasmania, University of Technology Sydney, and University of New South Wales in Australia, and the University of Waikato in New Zealand, to find out how to trigger its reproduction.
