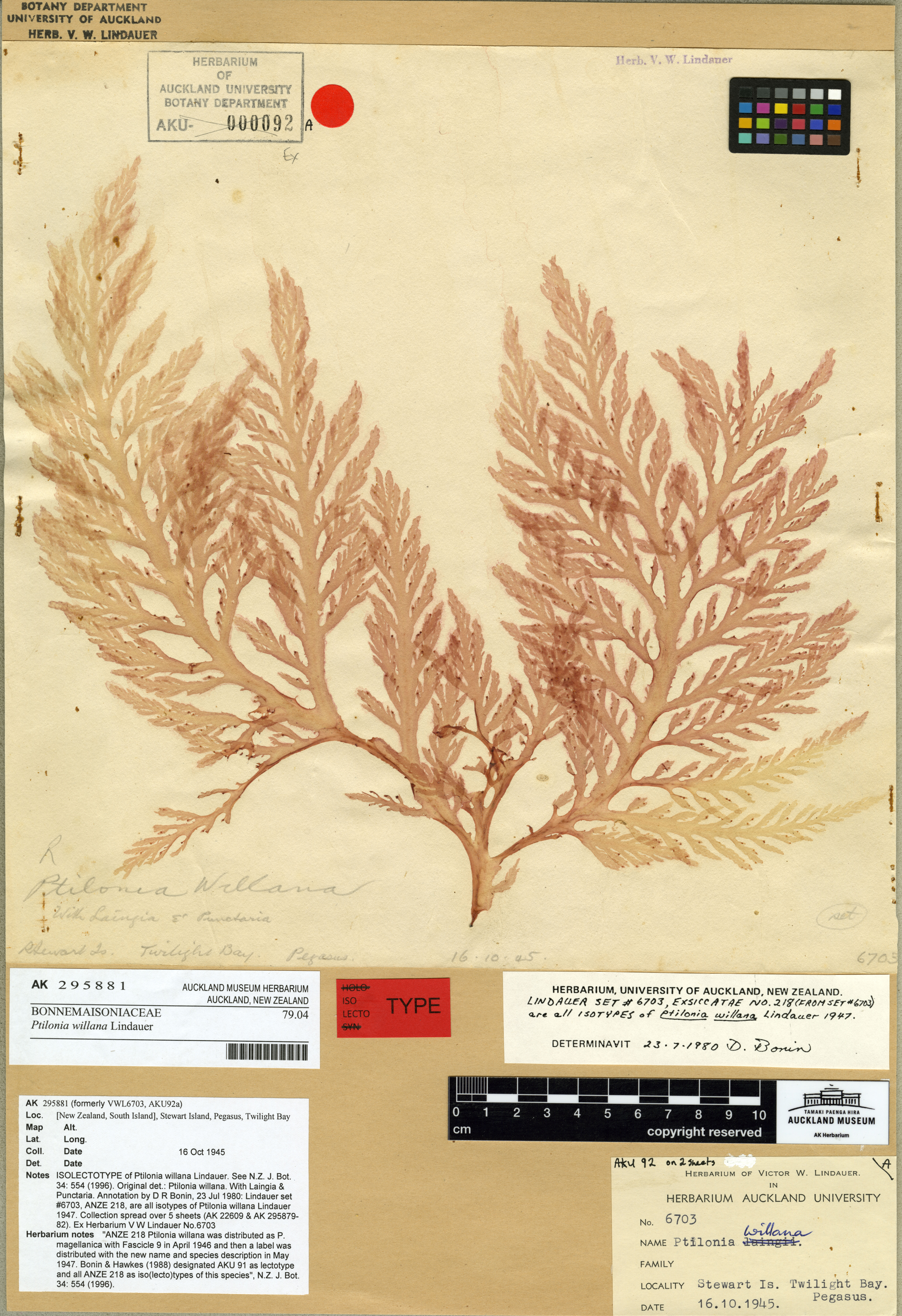

Scientific classification
- Clade: Archaeplastida
- Division: Rhodophyta
- Class: Florideophyceae
- Order: Bonnemaisoniales
- Family: Bonnemaisoniaceae
- Genus: Ptilonia
- Species: P. willana

Binomial name
- Ptilonia willana Lindauer, 1947

= Ptilonia willana =

Species of alga

Ptilonia willana is a marine red algal species endemic to New Zealand. For a detailed description, see Bonin and Hawkes (1988).

== Etymology ==
The species epithet, willana, honours Eileen Alice Willa who collected the type species at Port Pegasus in 1945.
