= Delisea elegans =

Scientific classification
- Clade: Archaeplastida
- Division: Rhodophyta
- Class: Florideophyceae
- Order: Bonnemaisoniales
- Family: Bonnemaisoniaceae
- Genus: Delisea
- Species: D. elegans

Binomial name
- Delisea elegans J. V. Lamouroux, 1819

Synonyms
- Bonnemaisonia elegans C.Agardh, 1822; Calocladia elegans (C.Agardh) J.Agardh 1841; Delisea elegans (C.Agardh) J.D.Hooker & Harvey, 1847

Species of alga

Delisea elegans is a species of red algae.
