= Dibromoiodomethane =

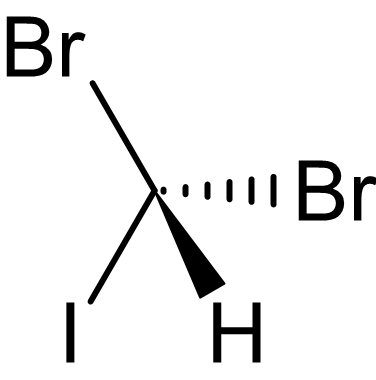

Names
- Preferred IUPAC name Dibromo(iodo)methane

Identifiers
CAS Number	593-94-2
3D model (JSmol)	Interactive image
ChemSpider	11163
PubChem CID	11653
CompTox Dashboard (EPA)	DTXSID60208040
- InChI: InChI=1S/CHBr2I/c2-1(3)4/h1H Key: SZVSEQHMMFKGEI-UHFFFAOYSA-N
- SMILES: C(Br)(Br)I

Properties
Chemical formula	CHBr_{2}I
Molar mass	299.731 g·mol^{−1}
Appearance	Dark red to dark brown oil
Density	3.3 g/cm³
Boiling point	185.9 °C (366.6 °F; 459.0 K)

Hazards
- GHS labelling
Pictograms	(GHS05: Corrosive)
Signal word	Danger
Flash point	66.2 °C
- Except where otherwise noted, data are given for materials in their standard state (at 25 °C [77 °F], 100 kPa). Infobox references

Dibromoiodomethane is a tetrahalomethane with the chemical formula CHBr_{2}I. This is a halomethane containing two bromine atoms and one iodine atom attached to the methane backbone. The compound is a by-product of chlorine disinfection of drinking water.

== Natural occurrence ==
The compound is found in such red algae as Asparagopsis armata and Asparagopsis taxiformis.

== Synthesis ==
The compound can be obtained by the reaction of bromoform and sodium hypoiodite, where sodium hypoiodite is generated in situ by the reaction of sodium hypochlorite with potassium iodide under alkaline conditions.
