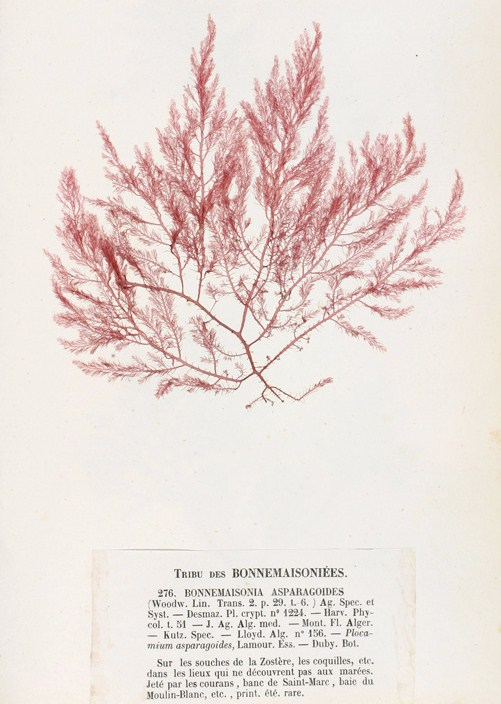
- Bonnemaisonia asparagoides

Scientific classification
- Clade: Archaeplastida
- Division: Rhodophyta
- Class: Florideophyceae
- Order: Bonnemaisoniales
- Family: Bonnemaisoniaceae
- Genus: Bonnemaisonia; C.Agardh, 1822

= Bonnemaisonia =

Genus of algae

Bonnemaisonia is a genus of red algae belonging to the family Bonnemaisoniaceae.

The genus name of Bonnemaisonia is in honour of Théophile Bonnemaison (1774–1829), a French pharmacist, botanist and naturalist from Quimper.

The genus has almost cosmopolitan distribution.

Species:

- Bonnemaisonia asparagoides (Woodward) C.Agardh
- Bonnemaisonia clavata G.Hamel, 1930
- Bonnemaisonia geniculata Gardn.
- Bonnemaisonia hamifera Hariot
- Bonnemaisonia nootkana Esp.
