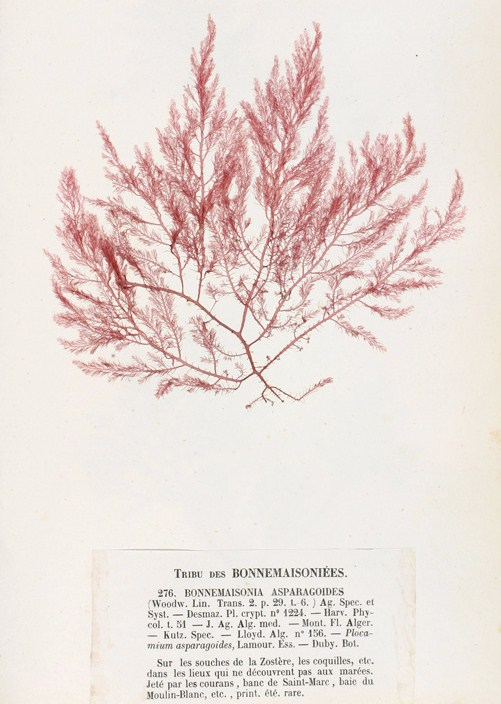
- Bonnemaisonia asparagoides

Scientific classification
- Domain: Eukaryota
- Clade: Archaeplastida
- Division: Rhodophyta
- Class: Florideophyceae
- Order: Bonnemaisoniales
- Family: Bonnemaisoniaceae
- Genus: Bonnemaisonia
- Species: B. asparagoides

Binomial name
- Bonnemaisonia asparagoides (Woodward) C.Agardh, 1822

Synonyms
- List: Bonnemaisonia adriatica Zanardini, 1847; Bonnemaisonia asparagoides var. teres Harvey; Callithamnion serpens P.L.Crouan & H.M.Crouan, 1859; Capillaria asparagoides (Woodward) Stackhouse, 1809; Conferva littoralis Forsskål, 1775; Fucus asparagoides Woodward, 1794; Hymenoclonium serpens (P.L.Crouan & H.M.Crouan) Batters, 1895; Plocamium asparagoides (Woodward) J.V. Lamouroux, 1813

= Bonnemaisonia asparagoides =

Species of alga

Bonnemaisonia asparagoides is a species of red alga in the family Bonnemaisoniaceae.
