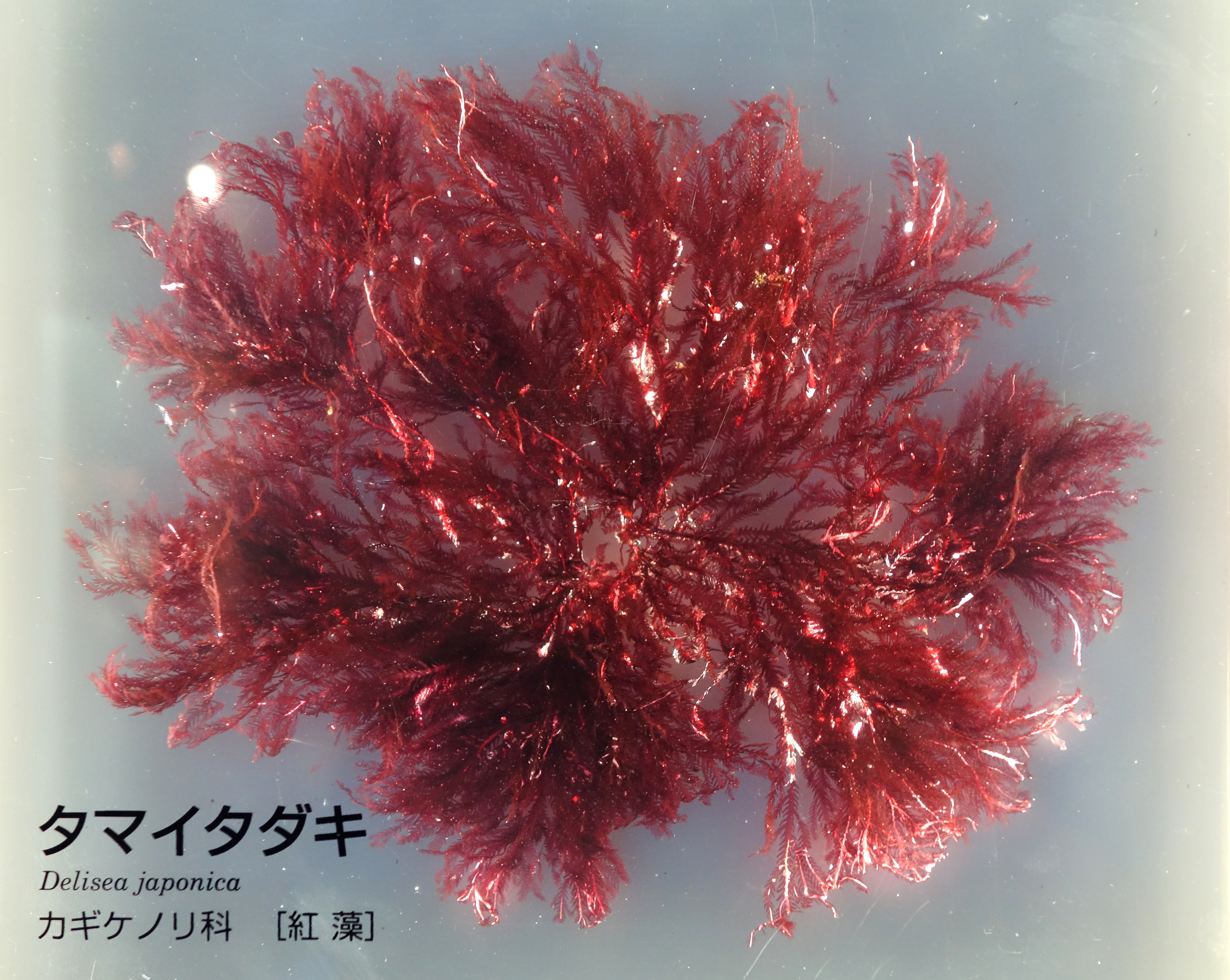
- Delisea pulchra at the National Museum of Nature and Science, Tokyo

Scientific classification
- Clade: Archaeplastida
- Division: Rhodophyta
- Class: Florideophyceae
- Order: Bonnemaisoniales
- Family: Bonnemaisoniaceae
- Genus: Delisea
- Species: D. pulchra

Binomial name
- Delisea pulchra (Greville) Montagne

Synonyms
- Delisea japonica

= Delisea pulchra =

Species of alga

Delisea pulchra is a red algae found in Southern Australia, New Zealand, the Subantarctic Islands and the Antarctic Peninsula. It produces a range of secondary metabolites called halogenated furanones that have ecological roles as defenses against epiphytes and herbivores.

== Halogenated furanones in Delisea pulchra ==
=== Localisation of furanones ===
Furanones are localised in the central vesicle of gland cells in D. pulchra. The presence of a series of conjugated double bonds in the structure of furanones cause these compounds to fluoresce when excited by the wavelength close to UV. Four main types of halogenated furanones were found in this species.

Prevention of biofilm on Delisea pulchra's surface

The halogenated furanones produced by D. pulchra are structurally similar to bacterial signalling molecules called acylated homoserine lactones (AHL). There is evidence that the halogenated furanones attach to the bacteria receptor proteins for AHLs disabling bacterial communication. In this way the seaweed can prevent biofilm accumulation on its surface.
