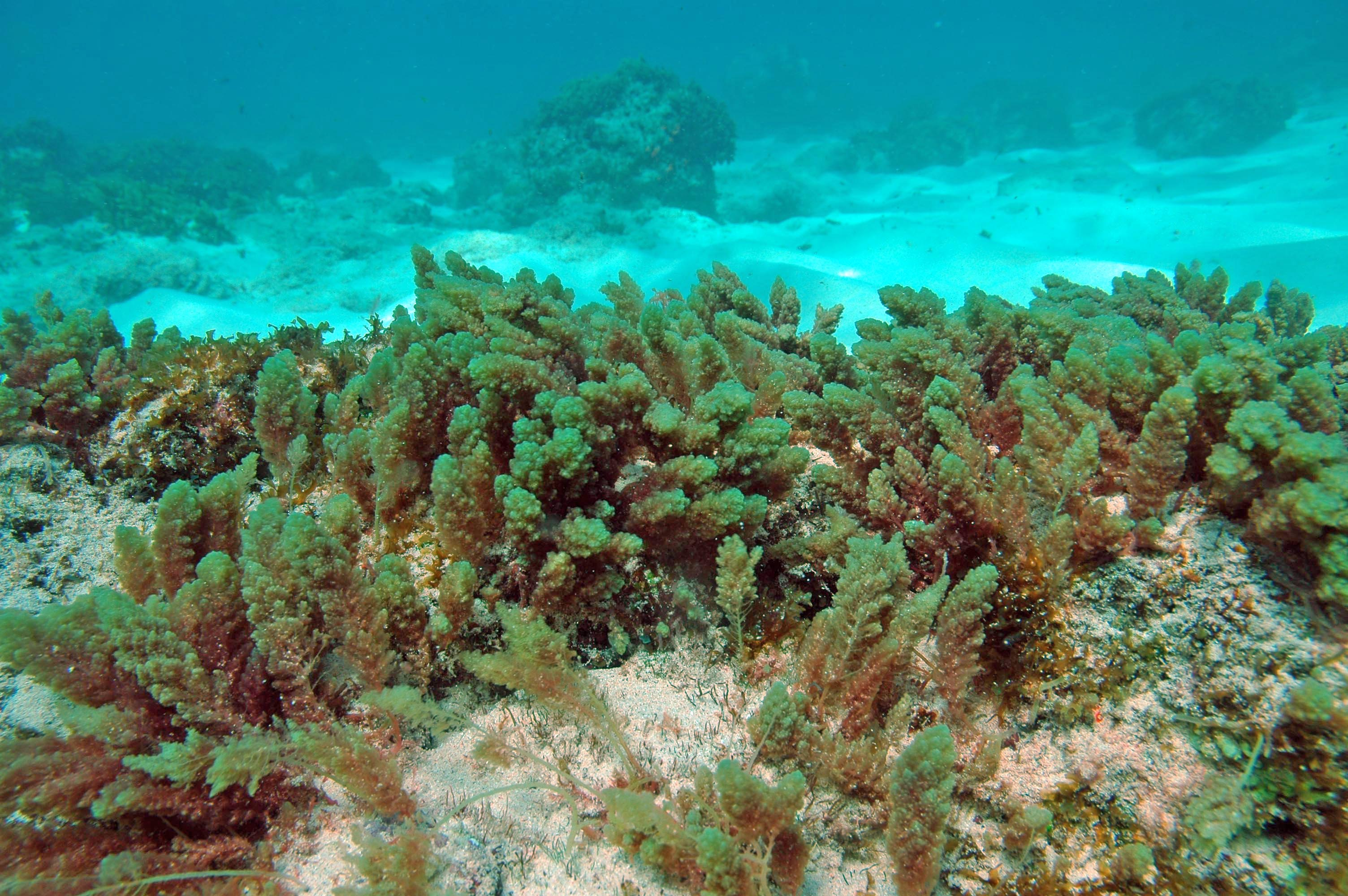
- Asparagopsis taxiformis in Mayotte.

Scientific classification
- Domain: Eukaryota
- Clade: Archaeplastida
- Division: Rhodophyta
- Class: Florideophyceae
- Order: Bonnemaisoniales
- Family: Bonnemaisoniaceae
- Genus: Asparagopsis; Mont.

= Asparagopsis =

Genus of algae

Asparagopsis is a genus of edible red macroalgae (Rhodophyta). The species Asparagopsis taxiformis is found throughout the tropical and subtropical regions, while Asparagopsis armata is found in warm temperate regions. Both species are highly invasive, and have colonised the Mediterranean Sea. A third accepted species is A. svedelii, while others are of uncertain status.

== Taxonomy and nomenclature ==
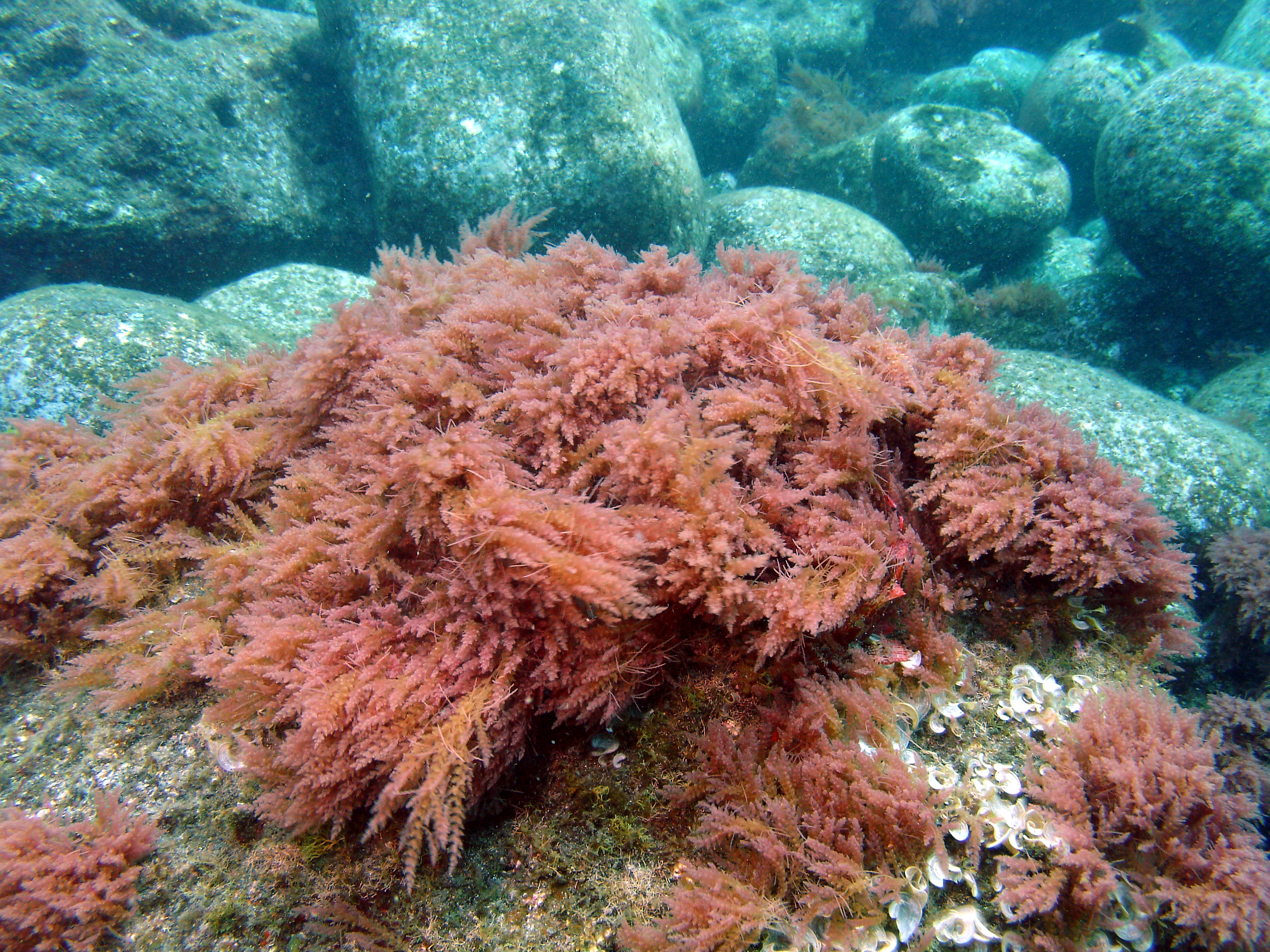
Asparagopsis armata

The genus Asparagopsis belongs to the order Bonnemaisoniales, and family Bonnemaisoniaceae. As of July 2022, there are three confirmed species:

- Asparagopsis armata Harvey, 1855
- Asparagopsis taxiformis (Delile) Trevisan de Saint-Léon, 1845
- Asparagopsis svedelli (W. R. Taylor)

Other possible species are still unconfirmed:

- Asparagopsis delilei (Montagne)
- Asparagopsis hamifera (Hariot)
- Asparagopsis sanfordiana (Harvey)

This genus, particularly Asparagopsis taxiformis, is also a complex species line which is composed of six cryptic lineages with different biogeographic distributions.

== General morphological description ==
=== Thalli (gametophyte) ===
The thalli are composed of erected feathery or plumose branches that arise from creeping stolons attached to substrate with the aid of rhizoids. The erect branches compose a central terete axis that give rise to densely arranged plumose branches. The plumose branches are composed of numerous fine, delicate, and densely determinate branchlets that are disposed around an axis. Creeping, harpoon-like barbed branchlets are uniquely found in Asparagopsis armata, which contributes to its status as one of the worst invasive species in the temperate regions.

The colour of thalli ranges from red to reddish brown. Some exhibits brown colouration, especially when exposed to the tides.

=== Reproductive structures (gametophyte) ===
The main reproductive structures are the cystocarps (female) and spermatangia (male). The cystocarps are subspherical to ovate in shape, and grow at the apices of the short branches. The structures are red in color, while the spermatangia are cylindrical in shape, and also grow at the apices.

=== Tetrasporophyte phase (falkenbergia) ===
The tetrasporophyte of the genus Asparagopsis is morphologically different from the gametophyte. It exhibits a turf-like appearance, with trisophonous filaments that occur in either red or brown colouration.

It is an interesting note that the cryptic lineages of Asparagopsis taxiformis line exhibit different morphological characteristics. Morphological delineation between these genetic lineages were observed and recorded on both gametophytic and tetrasporophytic forms. Size, shape, and number of cells were compared on the thallus, reproductive structures (spermatangia and carposporophyte) of each lineage. Results show that there is a difference between these structures of A. taxiformis cryptic lineages, on which a revision of the taxonomic status of this species has been proposed.

== Life history ==
Like other seaweeds from the order Bonnemaisoniales, the life history of the genus Asparagopsis is triphasic and heteromorphic, meaning an alternation of 2 diploid and 1 haploid stage constitute the whole life cycle. Reproduction begins when the spermatium (male gamete) from the male gametophyte fertilises the carpogonium (female gamete) of the female gametophyte. This results in a developing zygote that eventually becomes a diploid carposporophyte. The carposporophyte grows along the axes of the female branch and acts as a parasite, absorbing nutrients from the female plant. Seasonal environmental conditions, such as temperature, activate the release of mature carpospores from the cystocarp. Carpospores will settle and germinate to become tetrasporophytes. Eventually, tetrasporophytes will produce tetraspores, usually in sets of four, two spores will become the male gametophyte, while the remaining two become the female gametophyte. The sex ratio is normally 50:50.

== Distribution and habitat ==
The species Asparagopsis taxiformis is found throughout the tropical and subtropical regions, while Asparagopsis armata is distributed in the warm temperate region, where it clings to other seaweeds using its barbed harpoon branches. A. taxiformis typically grows on solid substrate of rocky-reef areas, from intertidal (wave and tide exposed) to subtidal areas.

== Ecological impacts ==
The genus Asparagopsis is known to be an important, highly invasive species. Both species A. armata and A. taxiformis are included on the list of the "worst invasive alien species threatening biodiversity in Europe and Mediterranean Sea". Asparagopsis armata, a native species from Australia and New Zealand, has spread its population strictly in the temperate region, particularly in Europe. Due to its invasive capacity, the presence of Asparagopsis has an effect on the distribution and abundance of other marine organisms, such as peracarid crustaceans.

Assemblage of epifaunal communities in the Mediterranean Sea shows a decrease in diversity and homogenised distribution compared with other associated seaweeds present in the area. The structure of the associated macrofauna (species composition, variability among samples, and relative abundance of the species) was also different in a habitat dominated by A. armata and A. taxiformis. This further validates the capacity of genus Asparagopsis to be successful and influential bio-invaders of different habitats.

== Economic use ==
The genus Asparagopsis, is used as food for human consumption; for medicinal applications: antibacterial, antimicrobial, antibiotic, and goitre, among others, and cosmetics. It also has the potential to be used in the development of pharmaceuticals.

In Hawaii, dried Asparagopsis taxiformis is considered as a delicacy, and is commonly eaten in poke (fish salad). The seaweed is prepared by cleaning and soaking it overnight in fresh water to remove the bitter iodine taste.

Like all macroalgae, Asparagopsis contains bromoform, a halogen compound which is known to inhibit methane production in ruminants. It has been shown to convert much of the enteric methane (a powerful greenhouse gas) to energy (and some carbon dioxide) for cattle during normal digestion. Because of its high bromoform content, Asparagopsis has proven to be very effective in inhibiting methane production in livestock. Laboratory experiments have shown that 2–5% of seaweed biomass effectively reduces emissions by 98–100%. A 2020 collaborative study conducted in Australia by Meat and Livestock Australia, CSIRO and James Cook University, confirmed the effectiveness of Asparagopsis in reducing methane emissions, and also showed emissions could be reduced by more than 98% with a 0.2% addition of Asparagopsis to cattle's feed. Emissions were reduced by 80% when Asparagopsis accounted for 3% of the cattle's feed. This could address the increased carbon footprint from the meat industry and mitigate climate issues in the long run.

=== From research to production ===
Subsequent to the Australian study, CSIRO established FutureFeed Pty Ltd., which holds the global intellectual property (IP) rights for the use of Asparagopsis for livestock feed, with the aim of significantly reducing enteric methane emissions in ruminants. In 2020, FutureFeed won a Food Planet Prize worth $1 million. The importance of the product is as a food supplement.

FutureFeed aims to support this use of Asparagopsis and licenses its IP accordingly. CH4 Global, with research and production facilities in Australia, was the first licensee. Its former New Zealand assets are now owned and operated by Asparagopsis Technologies. Other licensees include Sea Forest, also in Australia, Symbrosia and Blue Ocean Barns in the US, and Volta Greentech in Sweden.

Some organizations, including CH4 Global, Sea Forest, Blue Ocean Barns, Greener Grazing, and Asparagopsis Technologies, are developing methods for the large-scale cultivation of Asparagopsis, either in land-based and ocean hatchery systems.

As interest from the investment community has grown, several companies have obtained series A venture capital financing: Blue Ocean Barns received US$20 million, CH4 Global received an initial US$13 million, and Symbrosia US$7 million.

In 2022–23, Meat & Livestock Australia published a study of the use of Asparagopsis with canola oil as a carrier, in the "finishing diet" of penned Wagyu cattle. It resulted in a 28% reduction in methane (CH4) production. However, there was also persistently reduced liveweight, liveweight gain, and a trend to reduced carcase weight.
