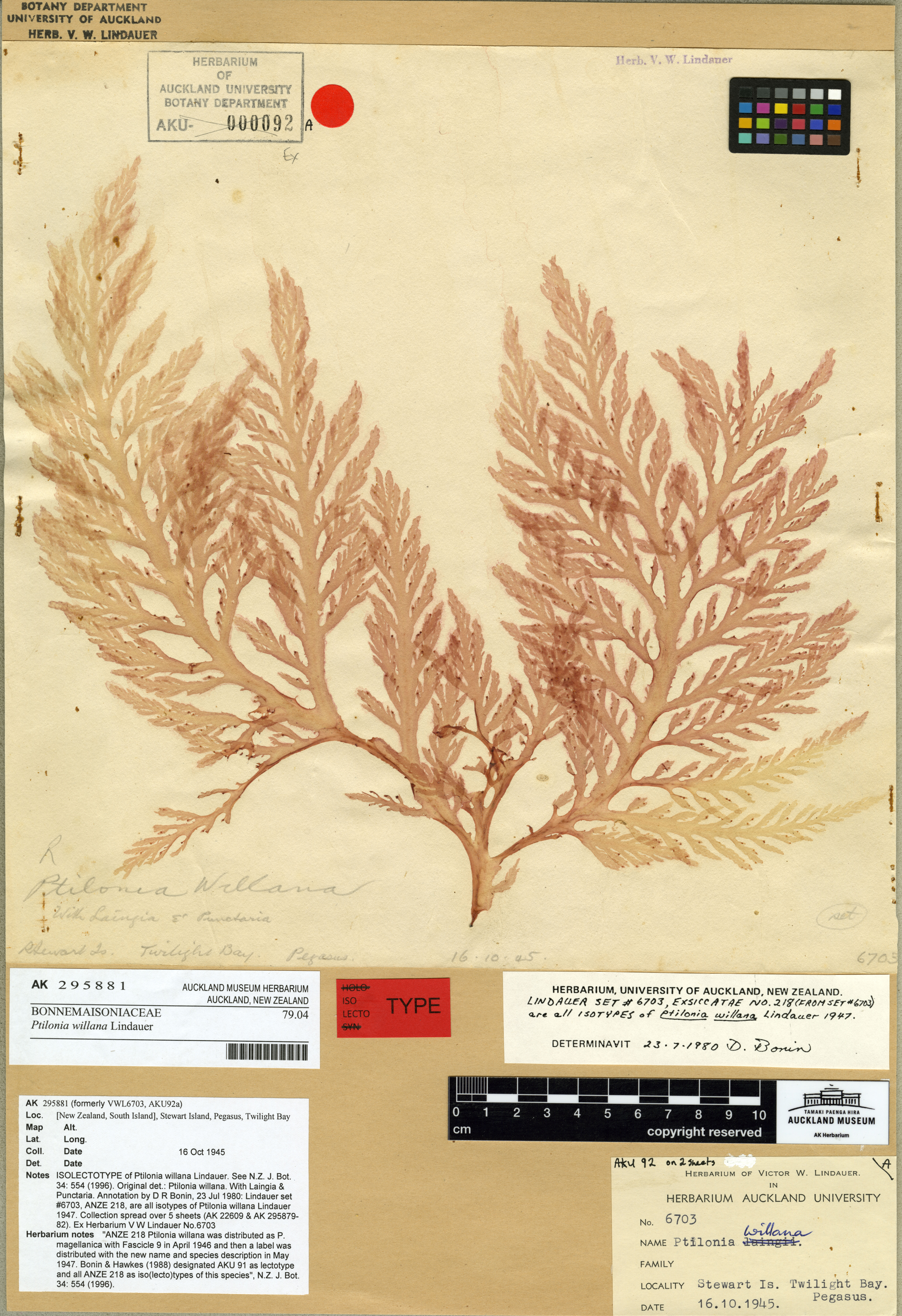
- Ptilonia willana (ASM AK295881)

Scientific classification
- Clade: Archaeplastida
- Division: Rhodophyta
- Class: Florideophyceae
- Order: Bonnemaisoniales
- Family: Bonnemaisoniaceae
- Genus: Ptilonia (Harvey) J. Agardh, 1863

Type species
- Ptilonia magellanica (Montagne) J.Agardh

Species
- See text

= Ptilonia =

Genus of algae

Ptilonia (Harvey) J. Agardh, 1863 is a genus of red algae in the family Bonnemaisoniaceae.

== Espécies ==
There are six species:

- Ptilonia australasica Harvey, 1859
- Ptilonia magellanica (Montagne) J. Agardh
- Ptilonia mooreana Levring, 1955
- Ptilonia okadae Yamada, 1933
- Ptilonia subulifera J. Agardh, 1890
- Ptilonia willana Lindauer, 1947
