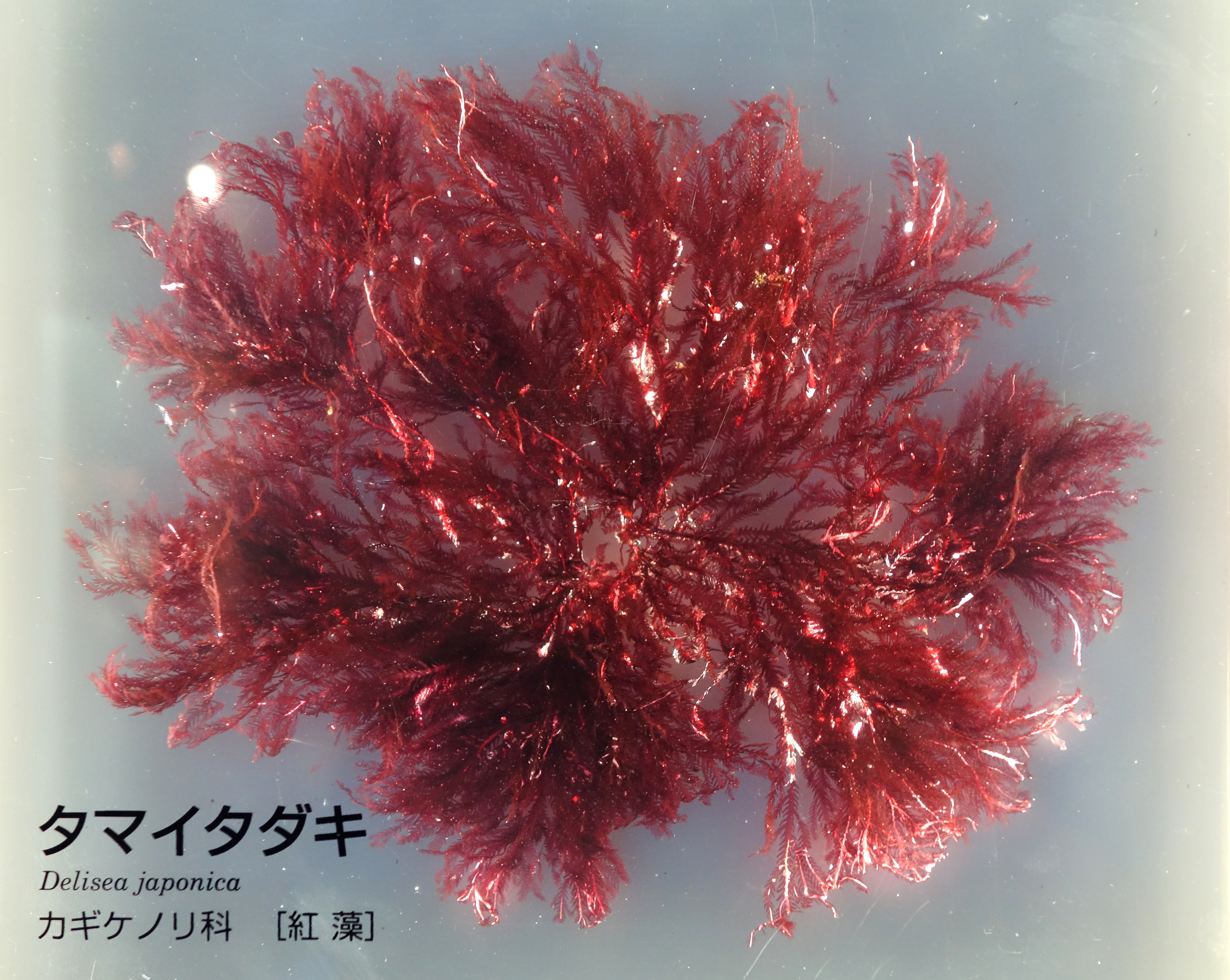
- Delisea japonica (Delisea pulchra) at the National Museum of Nature and Science, Tokyo

Scientific classification
- Clade: Archaeplastida
- Division: Rhodophyta
- Class: Florideophyceae
- Order: Bonnemaisoniales
- Family: Bonnemaisoniaceae
- Genus: Delisea; J. V. Lamouroux, 1819

Species
- Delisea compressa Levring 1955; Delisea elegans J. V. Lamouroux 1819; Delisea flaccida (Suhr) Papenfuss 1940; Delisea hypneoides Harvey, 1859; Delisea plumosa Levring 1955; Delisea pulchra (Greville) Montagne 1844

= Delisea =

Genus of algae

Delisea is a genus of red algae in the family Bonnemaisoniaceae.

The genus name of Delisea is in honour of French botanist and lichenologist Dominique François Delise (1780-1841).

The genus was circumscribed by Jean Vincent Félix Lamouroux in Dict. Sci. Nat. (F. Cuvier) Vol.13 on page 41 in 1819.
