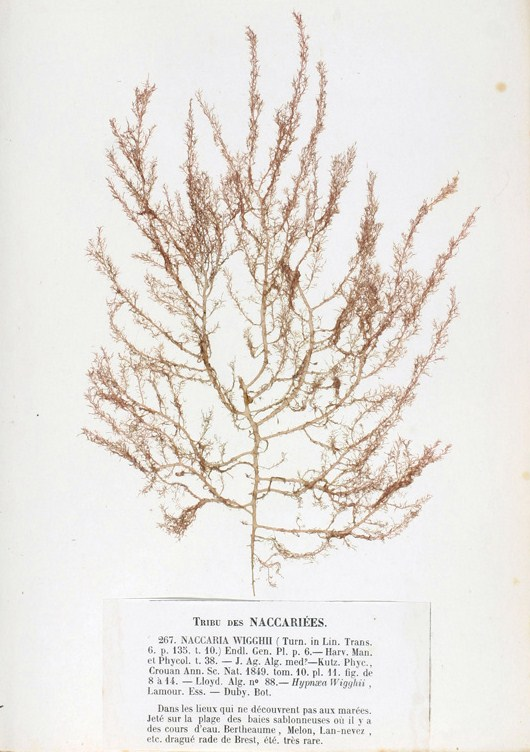
- Illustration of Naccaria wiggii, from 1852

Scientific classification
- Clade: Archaeplastida
- Division: Rhodophyta
- Class: Florideophyceae
- Order: Bonnemaisoniales
- Family: Naccariaceae; Johann Harald Kylin, 1928

= Naccariaceae =

Family of algae

Naccariaceae is a family of red algae in the order Bonnemaisoniales, with 3 monotypic genera that are found in both the Pacific and Atlantic Oceans.

== History ==
It was circumscribed by Harald Kylin in 1928. When established the family only had 2 genera, Atractophora and Naccaria. It was also suggested in 1987 (by Gabrielson and Garbary) and in 1997 (by Abbot) that the genera should be placed in the Gigartinales Order. But (Hommersand and Fredericq, 1990) said that the similarities in nutritive cells and carpospore germination, noted that the order Bonnemaisoniales was better used instead, Womersley, 1996 agreed. The family is not monophyletic.

== Description ==
They have a thallus (gametophyte) which is erect, mucosoid and irregularly radially branched. The structure is uniaxial; axial cells initially ecorticate (without a cortex), but eventually with a cortex, or surrounded by rhizoids (protuberances that extend from the lower epidermal cells) that can be secondarily inflated. They have determinate branches arising in a spiral or whorled pattern. The plants are usually dioecious. The spermatangia in clusters on outer cells. The Carpogonial branches (the female organs) are borne on basal cells of lateral branches, with nutritive cells. The fertilised zygote generally fusing with the hypogynous cell, then producing a diffuse or discrete gonimoblast lacking a pericarp (ovary wall). Tetrasporophytes, where known, are microscopic and filamentous, with lateral or terminal tetrahedrally divided tetrasporangia.

The gonimoblast filaments develop directly from the fertilized carpogonium though the carpogonium may fuse with the cell in the carpogonial branch (Kylin, 1928).

== Genera ==
As accepted by GBIF;

- Atractophora H.M.Crouan & P.L.Crouan, 1848 (Atractophora hypnoides P.L.Crouan & H.M.Crouan, 1848) (note Algaebase and Worms place this in a different class Florideophyceae).
- Naccaria Endlicher, 1836 (Naccaria wiggii (Turner) Endlicher )
- Reticulocaulis I.A.Abbott, 1985 (Reticulocaulis mucosissimus I.A.Abbott)

Also Liagorothamnion Huisman, D.L.Ballantine & M.J.Wynne, 2000 is listed as an accepted genus by WoRMS and AlgaeBase and placed within the Order Atractophorales (subclass Rhodymeniophycidae and class Florideophyceae).

== Distribution ==
Atractophore is found in the Atlantic Europe, while Naccaria is widespread in both the Pacific and Atlantic Oceans, lastly the genus of Reticulous is only found around the Hawaiian Islands.

== Other sources ==
- Kamiya, M., Lindstrom, S.C., Nakayama, T., Yokoyama, A., Lin, S.-M., Guiry, M.D., Gurgel, F.D.G., Huisman, J.M., Kitayama, T., Suzuki, M., Cho, T.O. & Frey, W. 2017. Rhodophyta. In: Syllabus of Plant Families, 13th ed. Part 2/2: Photoautotrophic eukaryotic Algae. (Frey, W. Eds), pp. [i]–xii, [1]–171. Stuttgart: Borntraeger Science Publishers. ISBN 978-3-443-01094-2
