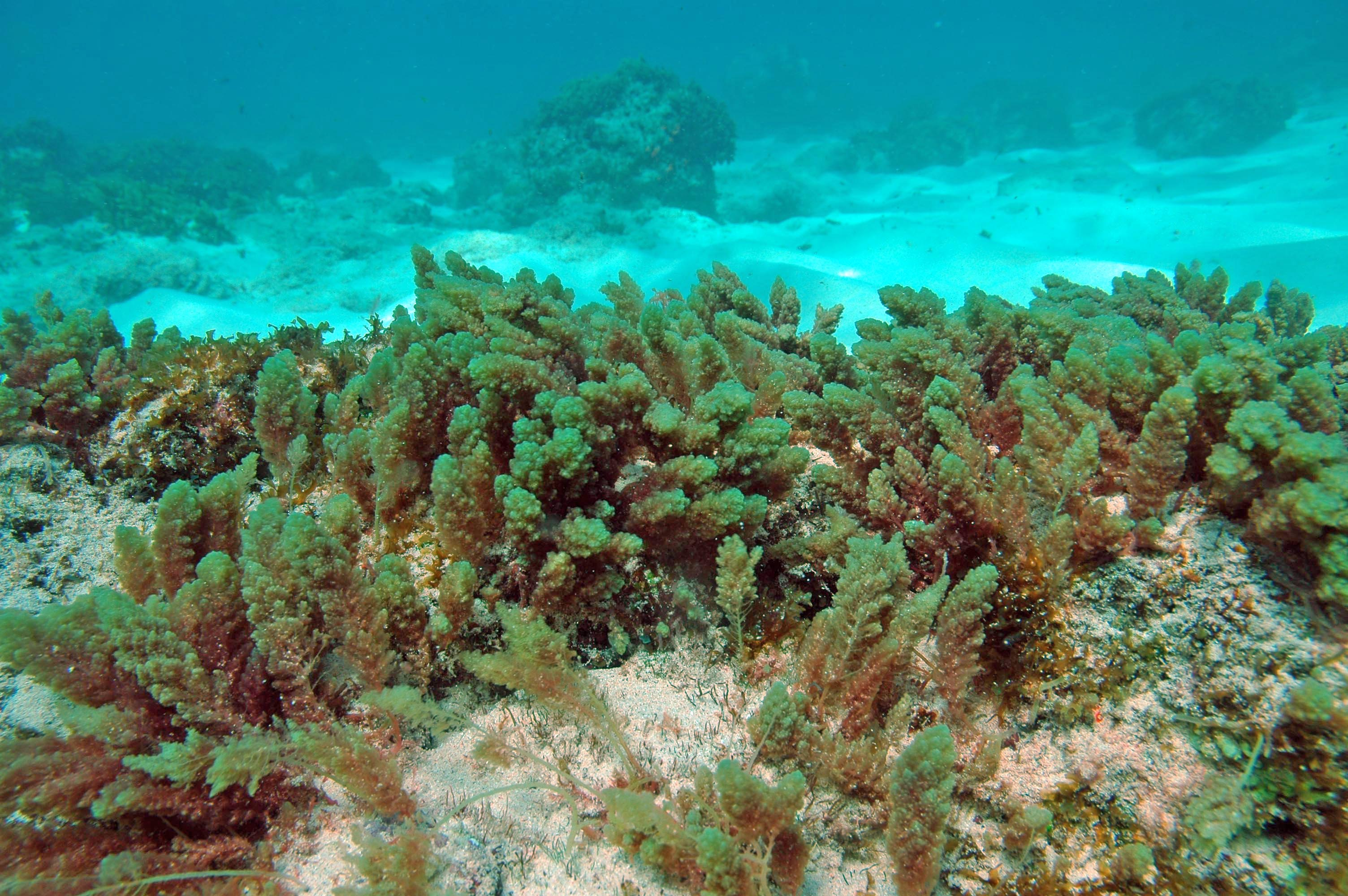
- Asparagopsis taxiformis in Mayotte.

Scientific classification
- Domain: Eukaryota
- Clade: Archaeplastida
- Division: Rhodophyta
- Class: Florideophyceae
- Order: Bonnemaisoniales
- Family: Bonnemaisoniaceae
- Genus: Asparagopsis
- Species: A. taxiformis

Binomial name
- Asparagopsis taxiformis (Delile) Trevis.

Synonyms
- Asparagopsis sanfordiana

= Asparagopsis taxiformis =

Limu Kohu

Species of seaweed

Asparagopsis taxiformis (red sea plume or limu kohu), formerly A. sanfordiana, is a species of red algae, with cosmopolitan distribution in tropical to warm temperate waters. Researchers have demonstrated that feeding ruminants a diet containing 0.2% A. taxiformis seaweed reduced their methane emissions by nearly 99 percent.

== Lifecycle ==
Like many red algae, A. taxiformis has a haplodiplophasic lifecycle, with each phase morphologically distinct. The species' diploid stage was initially described as Falkenbergia hillebrandii (Bornet) Falkenberg 1901 because it was thought to be a separate species.

== Culinary uses ==
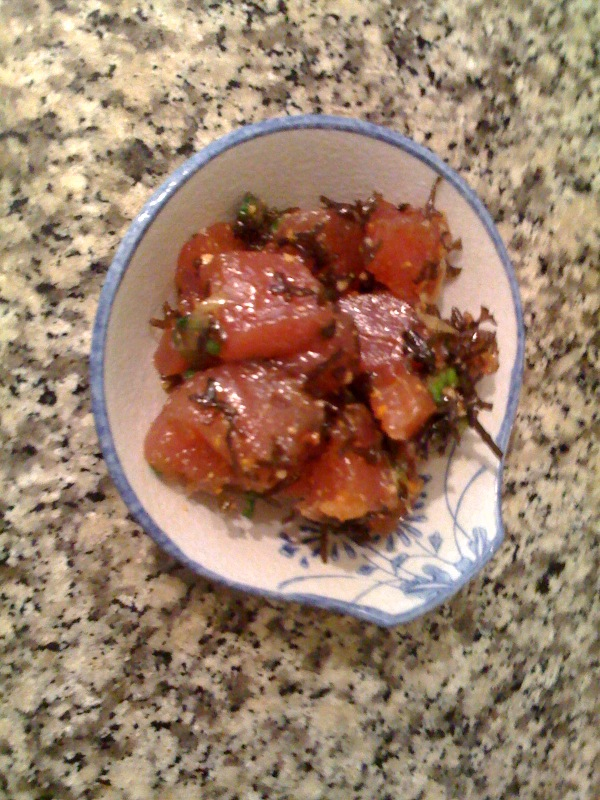
Ahi limu poke.

Asparagopsis is one of the most popular types of limu. in the cuisine of Hawaii, it is principally a condiment. It is known as Limu kohu in the Hawaiian language, meaning "pleasing seaweed". Limu kohu has a bitter taste, somewhat reminiscent of iodine, and is a traditional ingredient in poke.

The essential oil of limu kohu is 80% bromoform (tri-bromo-methane) by weight. It also includes many other bromine- and iodine-containing organic compounds.

== Methane emissions reduction in ruminants ==
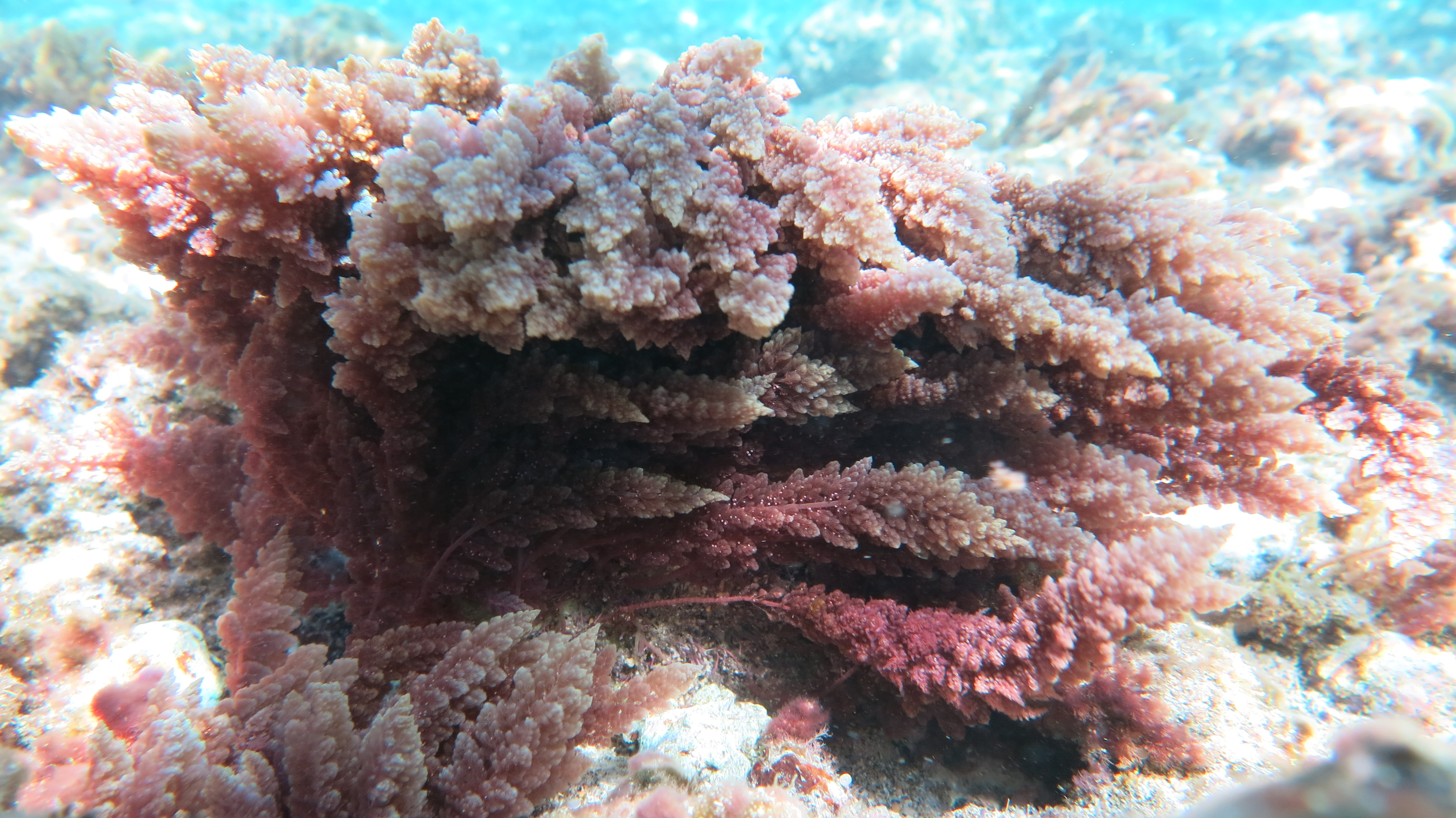
A. taxiformis in its habitat on the bottom of the ocean.

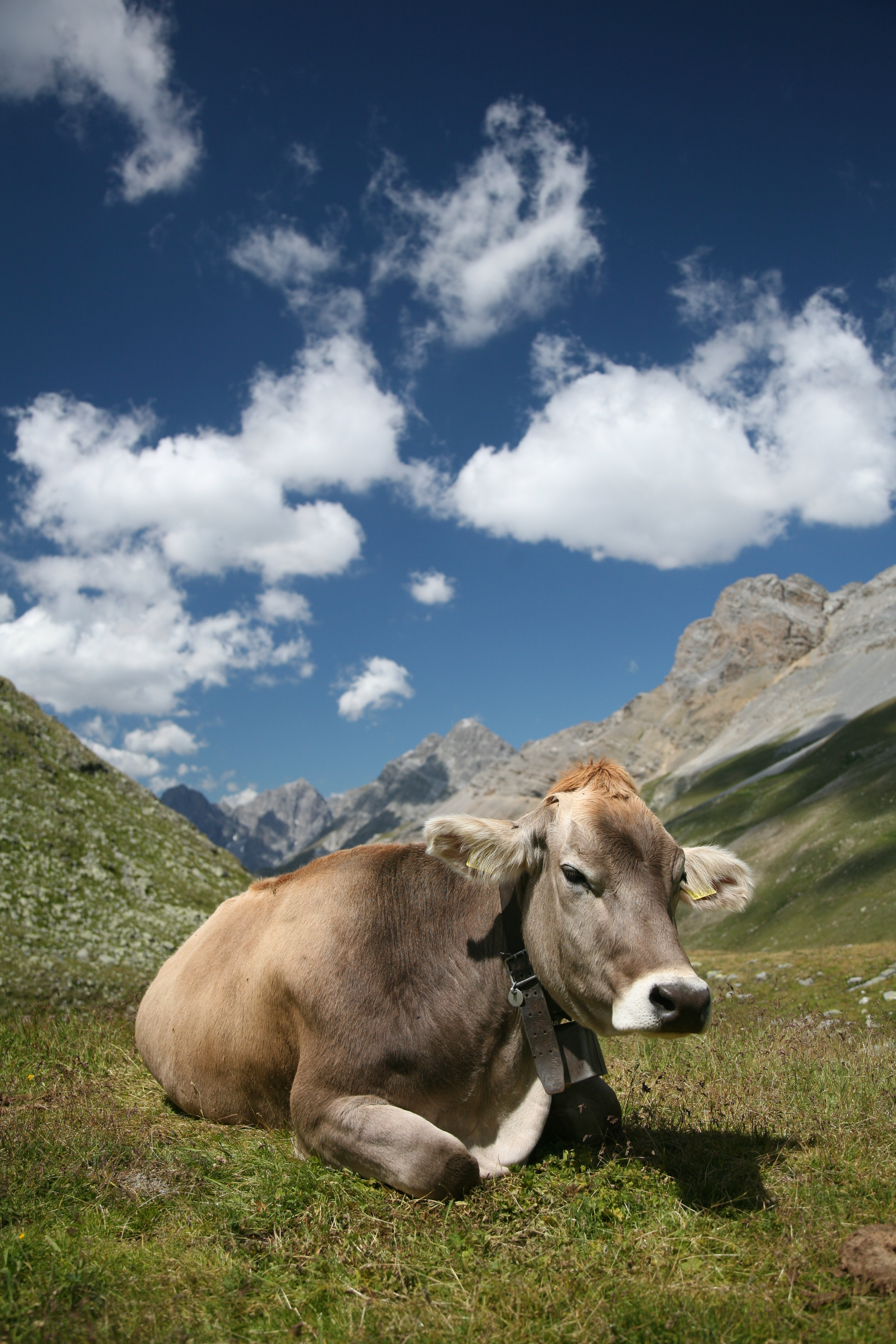
Cows burp tons of the greenhouse gas methane that comes from their foregut fermentation. However, if only a small percentage of their diet is A. taxiformis, this is greatly reduced.

In 2014, researchers at CSIRO and James Cook University (supported by Meat & Livestock Australia) demonstrated that treating ruminal fluid with one to two percent red seaweed reduced their methane emissions by over 90 percent. Of 30 types of seaweed tested, A. taxiformis showed the most promise, with nearly 99 percent effectiveness.

The findings spurred further investigation into its effects on ruminant animal enteric methane production. In 2016, the same team showed that 2-5% of seaweed biomass effectively reduced production by 98-100% in vitro and, in a separate study, identified the bioactives in A. taxiformis. While dichloromethane extract was the most potent bioactive, reducing methane production by 79%, bromoform and dibromochloromethane had the highest activity inhibiting methane production, and only bromoform is present in sufficient quantities to be effective. In 2020, they showed that a 0.2% addition of A. taxiformis to cattle's feed reduced the livestock's methane emissions by over 98%. In 2021, a team from UC Davis found that additions of 0.25% and 0.5% reduced cattle's enteric methane emissions by 69.8% and 80% respectively.

Supply from wild harvest is not expected to be adequate to support broad adoption. Subsequent to the Australian study, CSIRO established FutureFeed Pty Ltd., which holds the global intellectual property (IP) rights for the use of Asparagopsis for livestock feed, with the aim of significantly reducing enteric methane emissions in ruminants. In 2020, FutureFeed won a Food Planet Prize worth USD $1 million for the research behind its inception.

=== Aquaculture ===
A. taxiformis has yet to be commercially farmed at scale, but several companies are working towards it as they make the seaweed available to the livestock industry. A research/development initiative called Greener Grazing is seeking to close the life cycle of A. taxiformis and demonstrate ocean-based grow-out.

A startup out of KTH Royal Institute of Technology, Volta Greentech, Sea Forest, SeaStock, Immersion Group, Synergraze, Symbrosia and Blue Ocean Barns, are growing A. taxiformis in vertical, near-shore land-based tanks, using seawater to provide the proper temperature and nutrients. Symbrosia, from Yale University, is looking to integrate the cultivation with whiteleg shrimp on land, using a patent-pending technology. Another start-up, CH4 Global, has developed energy-efficient EcoParks in Australia and New Zealand to produce A. taxiformis for use in its solutions for feedlot cattle. CH4 Global has partnered with Clean Seas to grow A. taxiformis at Arno Bay, Australia, where it uses carbon and nitrogen waste from Clean Seas' ocean-based fish farms as food for the seaweed. In 2023 CH4 global reported its first commercial sale and intentions to feed the additive to 10,000 cattle.

Volta Greentech, Blue Ocean Barns, Symbrosia and CH4 Global have been backed by venture capital funds.

== See also ==
- Algaculture – Aquaculture involving the farming of algae
- Edible seaweed – Algae that can be used for culinary purposes
- Limu (algae) – Edible plants living under water or near water
