= Eileen Alice Willa =

New Zealand museum curator, botanist and author

- Born: 10 November 1905; Stewart Island
- Died: 31 January 1999 (aged 93); Invercargill
- Scientific career
- Fields: Botany; Phycology

Eileen Alice Willa (1905–1999) was a New Zealand botanical collector, museum curator and writer.

She was born Eileen Harrison on Stewart Island, and grew up with a love of botany. In 1928, she married Percy Willa and they settled at Halfmoon Bay, Stewart Island. While Percy fished, she explored and collected plants. In 1943, Victor Lindauer, a New Zealand algae collector, asked her to collect seaweeds from Stewart Island, to help him in his work. She sent many specimens, and from this time she started collecting seaweeds (as well as land plants). Like Lindauer, she too, hosted scientific teams visiting her home (Stewart Island).

Three species of seaweed honour Eileen Willa: Ptilonia willana (found at Port Pegasus in 1945), the large brown kelp, Durvillaea willana (Broad Bay, 1946) and Crouania willae (Ringaringa, 1960). In 1974 with three others, she co-authored the publication "The Marine Algae of Stewart Island".

A museum at Rakiura was established, showing collections of native flora. In 1963 she became its curator and worked there for 22 years. Her daughter, Ellen, died in 1975, and her husband in 1985, at which point she presented her herbarium of Stewart Island algae to the National Museum, Wellington, and left Stewart Island to live in Invercargill, where she died in 1999."

She collected some 6000 specimens held in at least seven herbaria (AK, BPBM, MIN, MICH, MELU, NHMUK and S), and across some 74 plant families. Her specimens are still contributing to scientific research.

Some of Eileen Alice Willa's specimens:

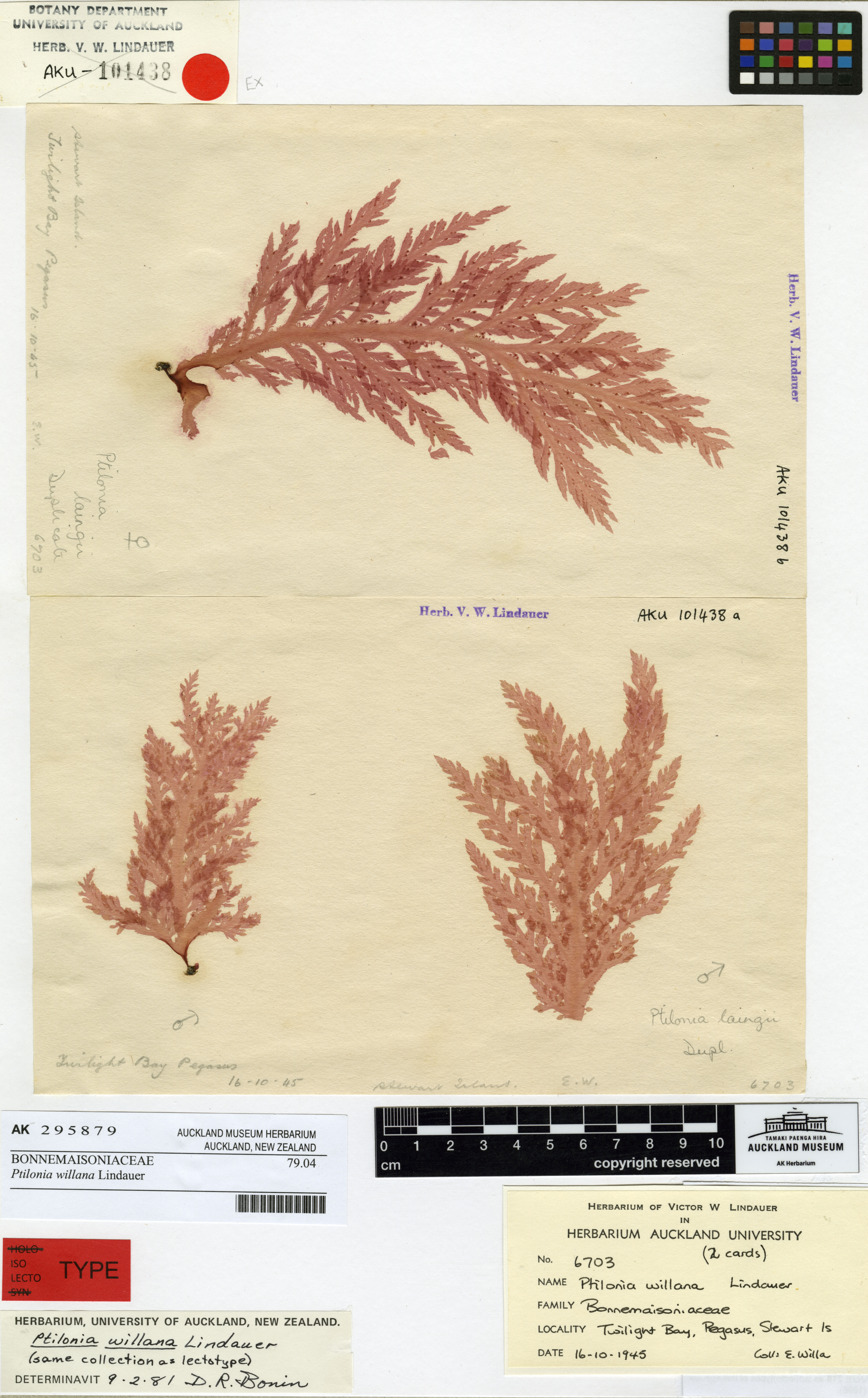
Ptilonia willana: AK295879

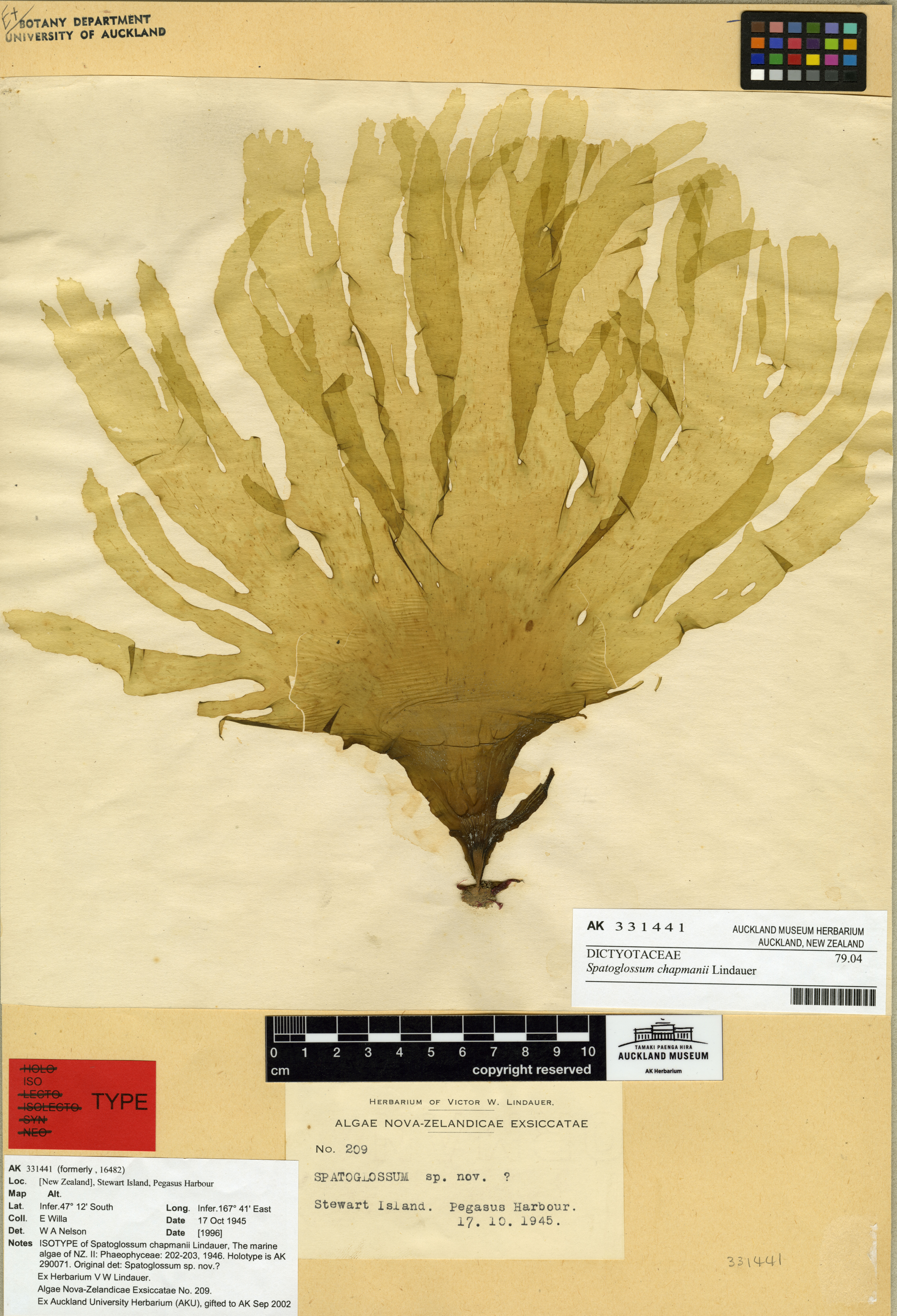
Spatoglossum chapmanii: AK331441)

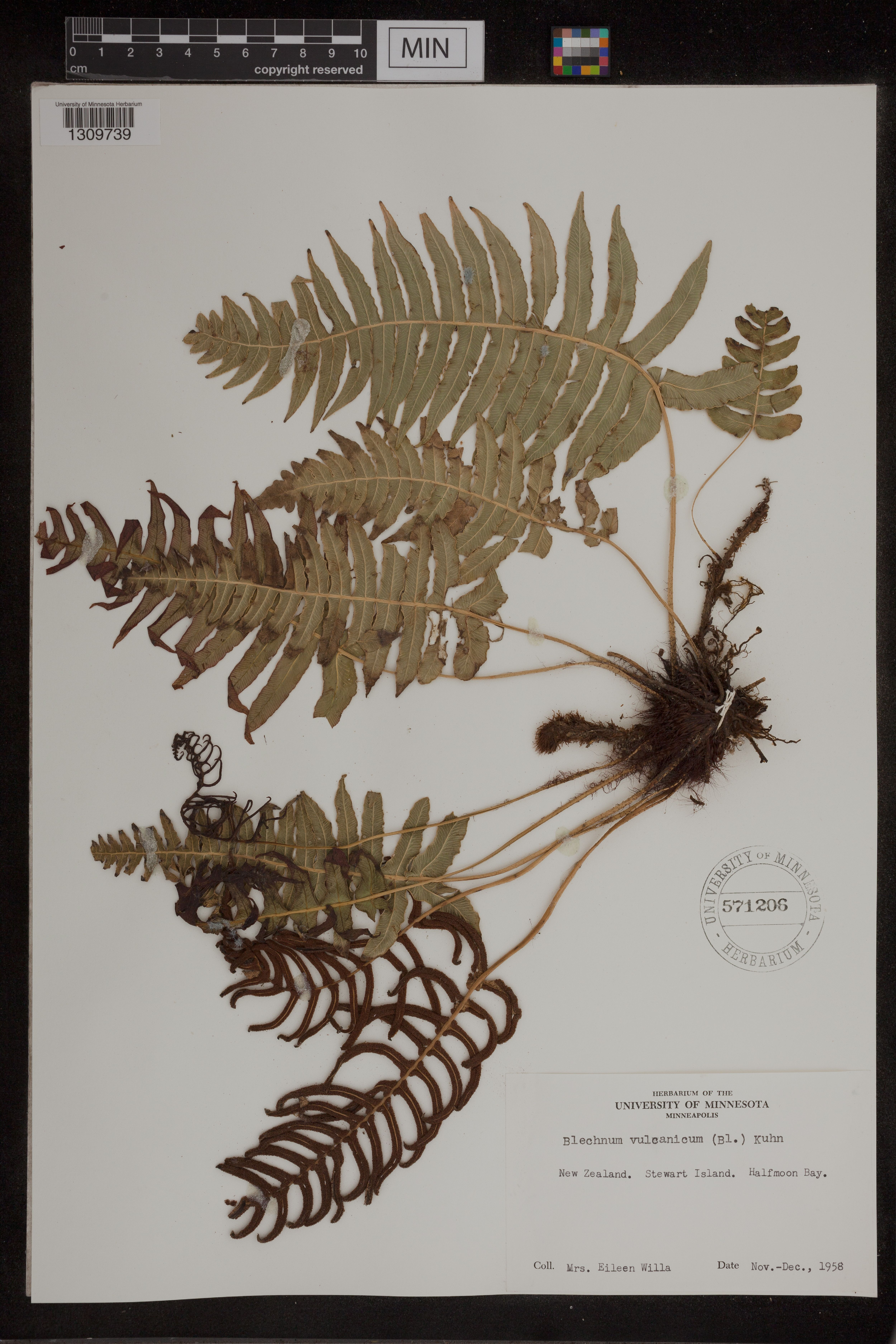
Blechnum vulcanicum MIN571206
