= FutureFeed =

Seaweed-based livestock feed ingredient

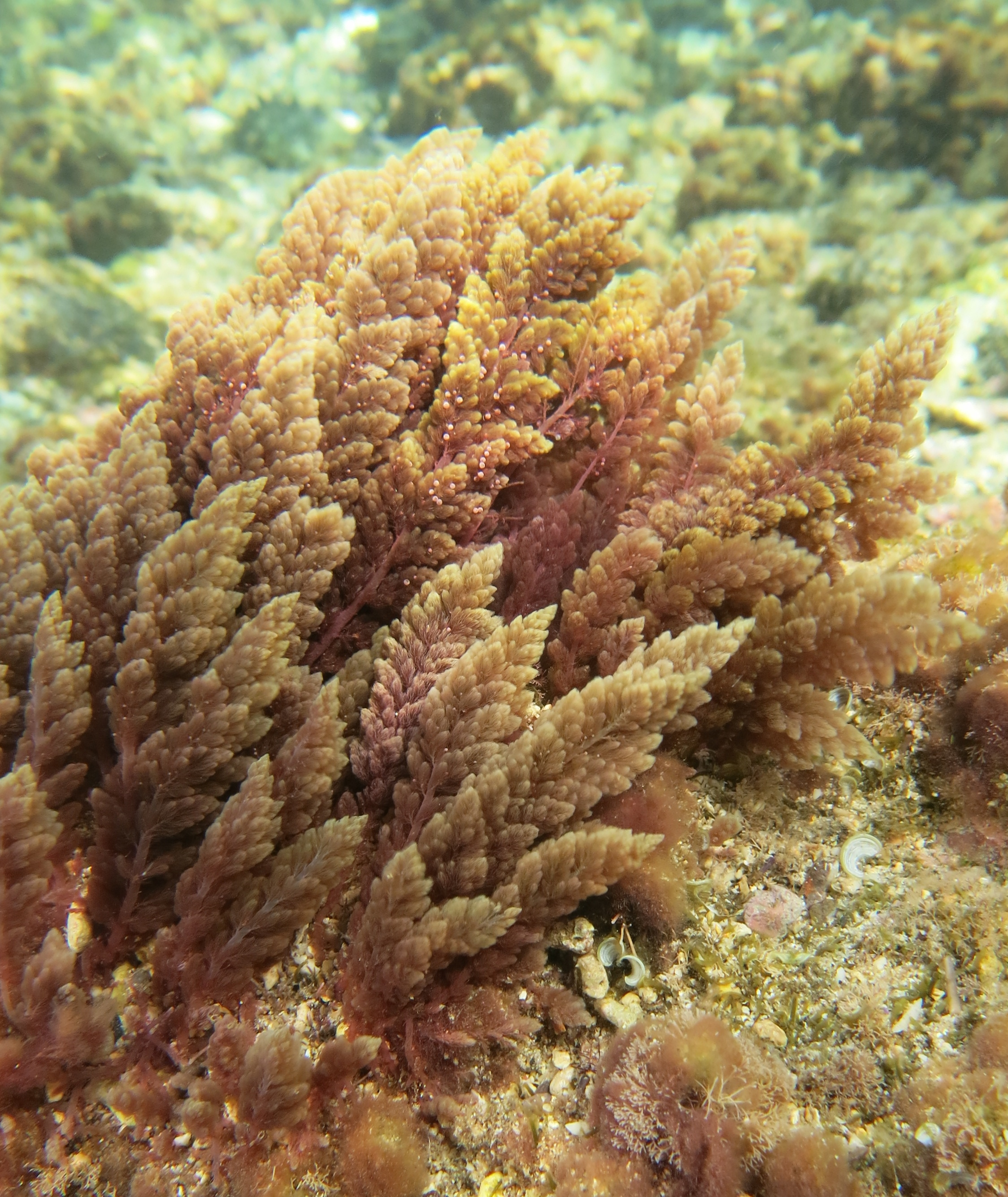
- Asparagopsis, the primary component of FutureFeed
- Type: Feed ingredient
- Inception: 2013
- Manufacturer: CSIRO
- Website: https://www.future-feed.com

FutureFeed is a ruminant livestock feed ingredient based on seaweed that can reduce methane emissions, established by Australia's Commonwealth Scientific and Industrial Research Organisation (CSIRO). FutureFeed holds the global intellectual property to use the seaweed Asparagopsis for livestock feed. Lowered methane emissions can be achieved by the addition of a small amount of the seaweed into the daily diet of livestock. This discovery was made by a team of scientists from CSIRO and James Cook University (JCU), supported by Meat & Livestock Australia (MLA), who came together in 2013 to investigate the methane reduction potential of various native Australian seaweeds.

Asparagopsis is a genus of red algae, endemic in many parts of the world, including Australia. The seaweed has proven to be the most efficient natural supplement available for lowering methane from ruminant livestock. It also has feed efficiency benefits. The active ingredient in seaweed is bromoform, which inhibits a key enzyme for methanogenesis.

== History ==
Cattle and sheep have long been known to voluntarily consume seaweed in variable amounts if they have access. Historical evidence suggests that farmers in Ancient Greece deliberately grazed cattle near beaches as a result of the productivity benefits it provided. This was also the case for Icelandic farmers in the 18th century.

FutureFeed's Chief Scientist Rob Kinley had a "lightbulb moment" in Canada in the early 2000's, where a Canadian dairy farmer, Joe Dorgan, had been allowing his dairy cows access to stormtoss seaweed that appeared naturally on his property. He reported consistent improvements in animal performance. Dorgan desired to commercialise this concept, but regulations required it be scientifically tested first.

Kinley and Professor Alan Freeden were recruited by Dorgan to perform official testing on the nutritional data of this seaweed and to quantify the effects it had on cattle health. Dorgan intended to harvest and sell seaweed as an organic alternative to conventional supplements. However, further testing revealed its ability to reduce methane emissions of livestock. Kinley discovered that this particular form of seaweed was capable of reducing methane production in cattle by up to 20%.

Following this discovery, Kinley moved to Australia to partner with CSIRO and James Cook University (JCU) to conduct further testing. A research team at JCU had previously studied the effects of algal feed additives on livestock production systems as part of the Centre for Macroalgal Resources and Biotechnology (MACRO). This collaboration provided the foundations for FutureFeed's commercial application of this research.

=== Research ===
In 2013, Rocky De Nys and his team at JCU along with CSIRO performed in vitro tests on 30 tropical macroalgae species using an artificial cow stomach. Dried seaweed biomass was mixed in with low quality roughage and combined with rumen fluid. Temperature and pH were then maintained to accurately simulate the fermentation process that occurs within ruminant stomachs during digestion. The total volume and concentrations of produced gases were measured for each sample at 12-hour intervals over a 72-hour period. All seaweed species were shown to reduce methane emissions in some capacity with a 50% average reduction. However this required dosages as much as 20% of dietary intake. This was problematic as the high concentrations required would most likely cause digestion issues for livestock by reducing the volume of volatile fatty acids. Asparagopsis taxiformis proved the most effective with a measured methane reduction of 98.9%. Dictyota was the second most effective seaweed with a measured methane reduction of 92%. The results of this experiment provided sufficient evidence for CSIRO to select Asparagopsis as the main ingredient in livestock feed.

In 2014, a patent on a method for reducing total gas production and/or methane production in ruminants (such as sheep and cattle) was registered by CSIRO, MLA and JCU.

De Nys and Kinley expanded upon the experiment in 2015 with the goal of finding an ideal dosage of Asparagopsis. The aim was to maximise methane reduction without compromising enteric health. Varying concentrations of Asparagopsis taxiformis were mixed with Rhodes grass and examined using standardised in vitro culture methods. Five dosages were tested ranging from 0.5% to 10% of dietary composition. The optimum concentration was determined to be 2%, as it virtually eliminated methane production and reduced the volume of total gases produced by 30% without affecting fermentation efficiency. Dosages under 5% had no effect on volatile fatty acid concentrations, which is the primary source of energy resulting from digestion.

In 2016, live tests were performed on sheep at the CSIRO Centre for Environment and Life Sciences in Floreat, Western Australia. 29 merino sheep were fed one of five dosage levels (0%, 0.5%, 1%, 2% or 3% dietary intake) and monitored over a 72-day feeding period. In dosages of 2%, methane emission reductions of up to 85% were recorded when compared to control sheep. The sheep given dosages of 0.5% recorded at least a 50% reduction in methane emissions. No evidence of microbial adaptation occurred over the 72 days of testing and methane was continually and consistently mitigated. Tissue examination showed no adverse effects on the overall health of the sheep.

In 2017, live tests over 90 days were performed on cattle at the CSIRO Lansdown facility in Queensland. 28 Brahman-Angus steers were separated into four groups and given varying dosages of dried Asparagopsis in a simulated feedlot. Concentration levels for each group were 0% (control), 0.5% (low), 1% (medium) and 2% (high) intake of Asparagopsis. Emissions monitoring was performed regularly using respiration chambers. Weekly weight checks were conducted to monitor cattle productivity. At the conclusion of the project, the cattle were terminated and had their carcasses sent to Meat Standards Australia (MSA) for meat quality assessment. The MSA found that Asparagopsis had no effect on meat eating quality. The bioactive bromoform was not detectable in tissues of treated steers, given a two-day withdrawal period.

In 2019, a panel of testers were unable to discern any difference in taste between control milk and milk produced by cattle with seaweed supplements added to their diet.

In 2021 sensory testing showed high meat-eating quality and celebrity chef Matt Moran cooked the world's first low-methane steaks. The first licences were also granted by FutureFeed to companies in USA and Australia to cultivate and process Asparagopsis into a livestock feed product.

The first commercial sales of freeze-dried Asparagopsis were achieved in 2022 and licences were granted to a further seven companies in Australia, Sweden, USA and Canada. FutureFeed also added a patent for preparing Asparagopsis in an oil composition and won the Australian Financial Review's Sustainability Leaders Award in the Agriculture and Environment category. In 2023, Asparagopsis-oil was successfully trialled in beef feedlot and dairy systems and a large herd trial determined productivity benefits of Asparagopsis for beef cattle.

=== Recognition ===
In 2020, FutureFeed won a Food Planet Prize worth USD $1 million. FutureFeed was also shortlisted for the 2021 Eureka Prize in the Applied Environmental Research category.

FutureFeed were named winners of the 2023 Bloomberg NEF Pioneers Award and many of its licensees raised further capital, won major industry awards and secured large commercial contracts on the back of production plans.

== Mechanism of action ==
Asparagopsis seaweed naturally contains halogenated methane analogues, mainly bromoform (CHBr_{3}) at 1.7% dry weight, as a form of antibacterial defense. These chemicals act as an inhibitor for cobamide-dependent methyltransferase (see: Coenzyme M), a key enzyme for methanogenesis.

== Production ==
Asparagopsis requires very little processing. It is harvested from a seaweed farm then uses freeze drying or controlled drying to preserve as much bioactivity as possible. This can then be packaged and transported as required. Alternatively, it can be steeped in an edible oil, such as canola. Homogeneity of seaweed biomass within the feed must be maintained to ensure uniform intake for consistent effect.

Asparagopsis is either one of two species: Asparagopsis taxiformis or Asparagopsis armata. Both species have very similar biochemistry and thus negligible difference in performance as an additive. The main distinction between either species is the conditions that each flourishes in. A. taxiformis thrives in tropical and subtropical climates and can be found in Australian coastal waters, predominantly in northern Queensland and Western Australia. A. armata thrives in temperate climates and is found naturally in the Mediterranean Sea and Tasman Sea.

== Effect on livestock ==
Asparagopsis, a seaweed native to Australia, contains bioactives that interrupt the microbes in a cow's stomach that form methane. It is the most efficient natural methane supplement available for livestock – capable of reducing methane emissions by more than 80 per cent in controlled conditions.

Asparagopsis can be included in feed and supplements as a stabilised freeze-dried powder, or in an edible oil. FutureFeed research has included the supplement in feedlot and dairy total mixed rations (TMR) and dairy cows supplemented twice daily at milking. A decade of science has shown this to be a safe and effective feed ingredient for livestock.

Research into livestock methane production has shown that up to 12% of energy that fodder produces during digestion is lost as methane gas emissions, primarily from belching. It is a common misconception that the majority of methane emissions from livestock is through flatulent gas. Flatulent gas contributes to less than 10% of methane emissions as opposed to belching which contributes up to 95%. This is caused by bacteria living within the first stomach, known as the rumen, which serves as a 'fermentation tank' to effectively break down nutrients during digestion. Methane production represents an inefficiency of energy conversion that would otherwise contribute to the productive metabolism of livestock, such as milk, muscle or wool production. Productivity improvements are directly related to the quality of feed that is ingested. Grain-based feeds, such as corn and barley, produce up to one third less methane gas in cattle than grass fed cattle.

By impeding methane production, Asparagopsis increases the efficiency of ruminant digestion in livestock to improve productivity.

== See also ==
- 3-Nitrooxypropanol
