= Victor Wilhelm Lindauer =

New Zealand phycologist, collector and teacher

- Born: 1888; Auckland
- Died: 1964; Russell, New Zealand
- Occupations: phycologist, collector and teacher
- Father: Gottfried Lindauer

Victor Wilhelm Lindauer (1888–1964) was a New Zealand phycologist, collector and teacher.

The son of New Zealand painter Gottfried Lindauer, he was born in 1888 in Auckland, and grew up in Woodville, spending a considerable part of his boyhood in the native bush. He trained as a teacher and after two years service in WWI with the US Army, he returned to New Zealand.

In 1927 Lindauer married Elsie (née Lovell), and in 1931, after the births of four children, the family moved to Russell where he had been appointed headmaster of the primary school. In 1935, Josephine Tilden and a team of phycologists from the University of Minnesota came to Russell to collect seaweeds and enlisted his help to provide a place (the local school) to handle their material. They also invited him to participate, and thus began his lifelong quest to collect New Zealand seaweeds. The school children whom he taught collected for him and with him. Other schoolmasters were also enlisted, not only on the North Island, but also R. Gilpin, a headmaster on the Chatham Islands. On Stewart Island, he contacted Eileen Willa, and she, too, became an avid collector.

Between 1939 and 1953 Lindauer created and distributed about 60 sets of the exsiccata work Algae Nova Zelandicae Exsiccatae in 14 fascicles of 25 sheets, meaning 350 numbered specimen units. The sets have since been used as reference material for many taxonomic studies of New Zealand algae.

== Selected publications ==
- Lindauer, V.W. (1938). "Note on a new species of New Zealand Champia". Transactions of the Royal Society of New Zealand. 67: 411–413.
- Lindauer, V.W. (1939). "Note on the tetrasporic form of Gigartina alveata". Transactions of the Royal Society of New Zealand. 69: 378–379.
- Lindauer, V.W. (1945). "Note on the brown alga Ecklonia brevipes J.Ag". Transactions of the Royal Society of New Zealand. 75: 394–397.
- Lindauer, V.W. (1947). "An annotated list of the brown seaweeds, Phaeophyceae, of New Zealand". Transactions of the Royal Society of New Zealand. 76: 542–566.
- Lindauer, V.W. (1949). "Additions to the marine algae of New Zealand". Transactions of the Royal Society of New Zealand. 77: 390–393.
- Lindauer, V.W. (1949). "Notes on marine algae of New Zealand-I". Pacific Science. 3: 340–352.
- Lindauer, V.W. (1953). "Some New Zealand algal confusions". Proceedings of the Seventh Pacific Science Congress (Botany). 5: 18–21.
- Lindauer, V.W. (1957). "A descriptive review of the Phaeophyceae of New Zealand". Transactions of the Royal Society of New Zealand. 85: 61–74.
- Lindauer, V.W. (1960). "New species of Phaeophyceae from New Zealand". Revue Algologique. 3: 161–72.
- Lindauer, V.W. & Setchell, W.A. (1946). "Note on a new species of red alga, Lenormandia coronata". Transactions of the Royal Society of New Zealand. 76: 66–67.
- Lindauer, V.W., V.J.Chapman, M.Aiken (1961). "The marine algae of New Zealand-II.Phaeophyceae". Nova Hedwigia. 3: 129–350.
Some algae collected by Lindauer

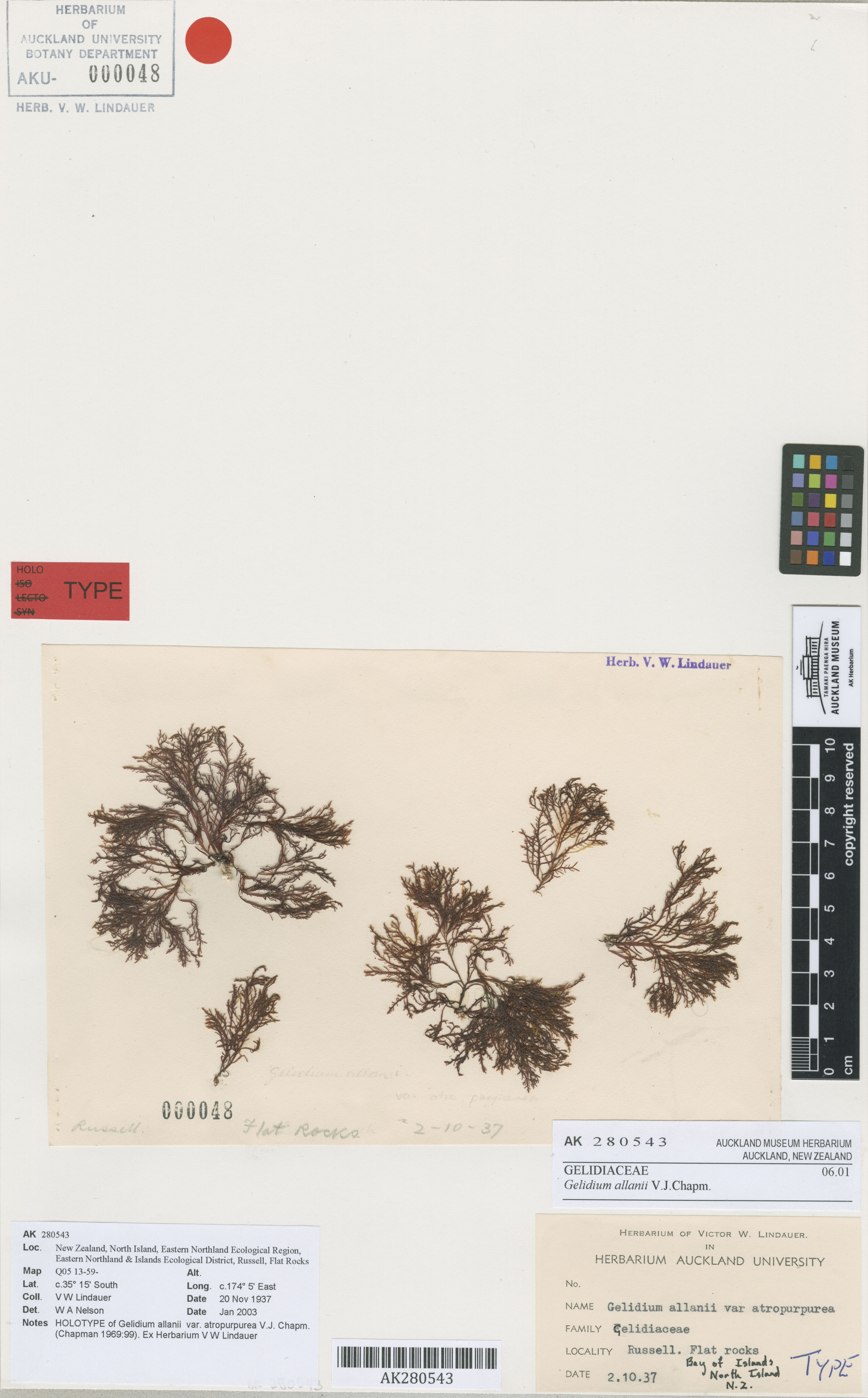
Gelidium allanii AK 280543

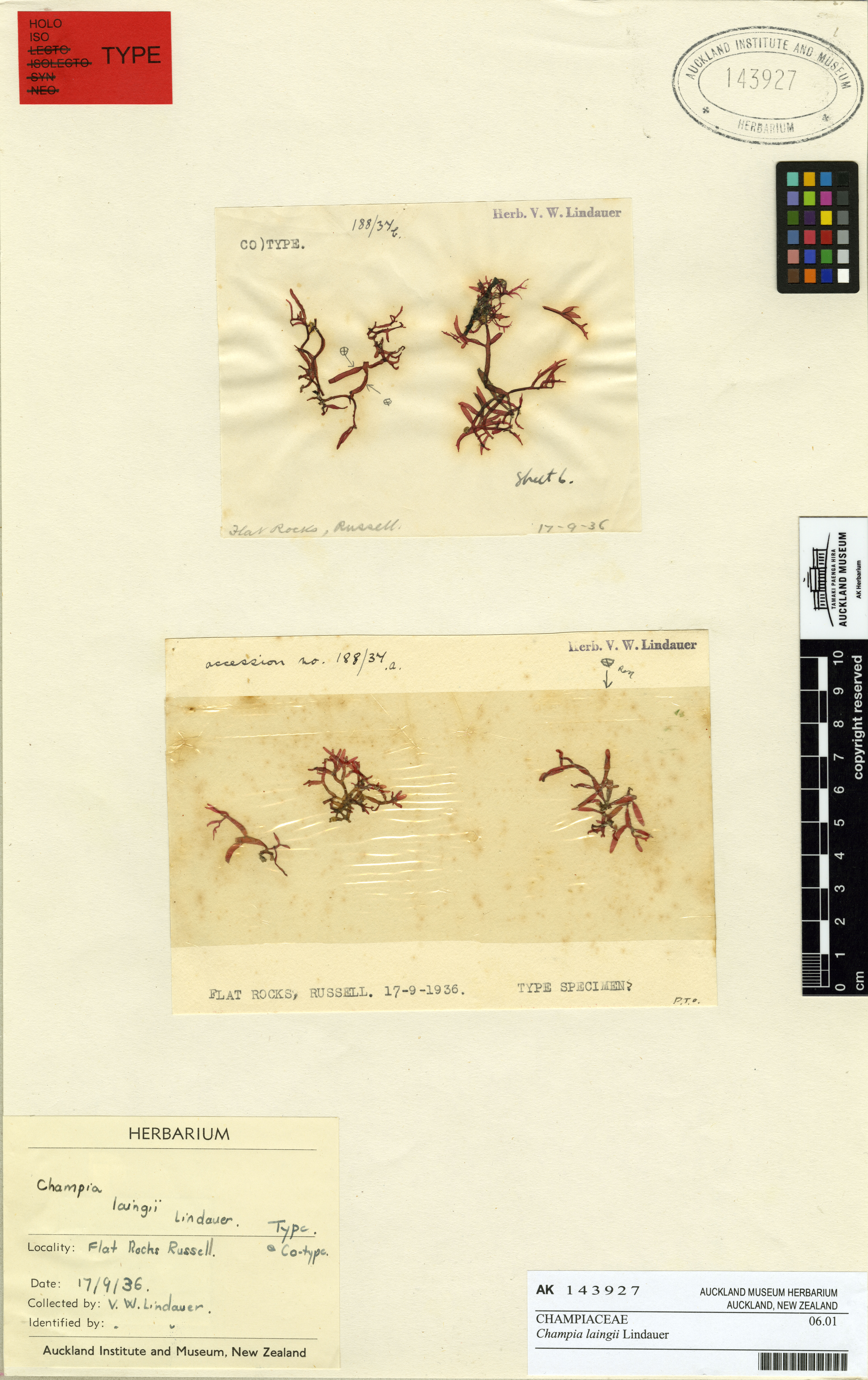
Champia laingii (AK143927)

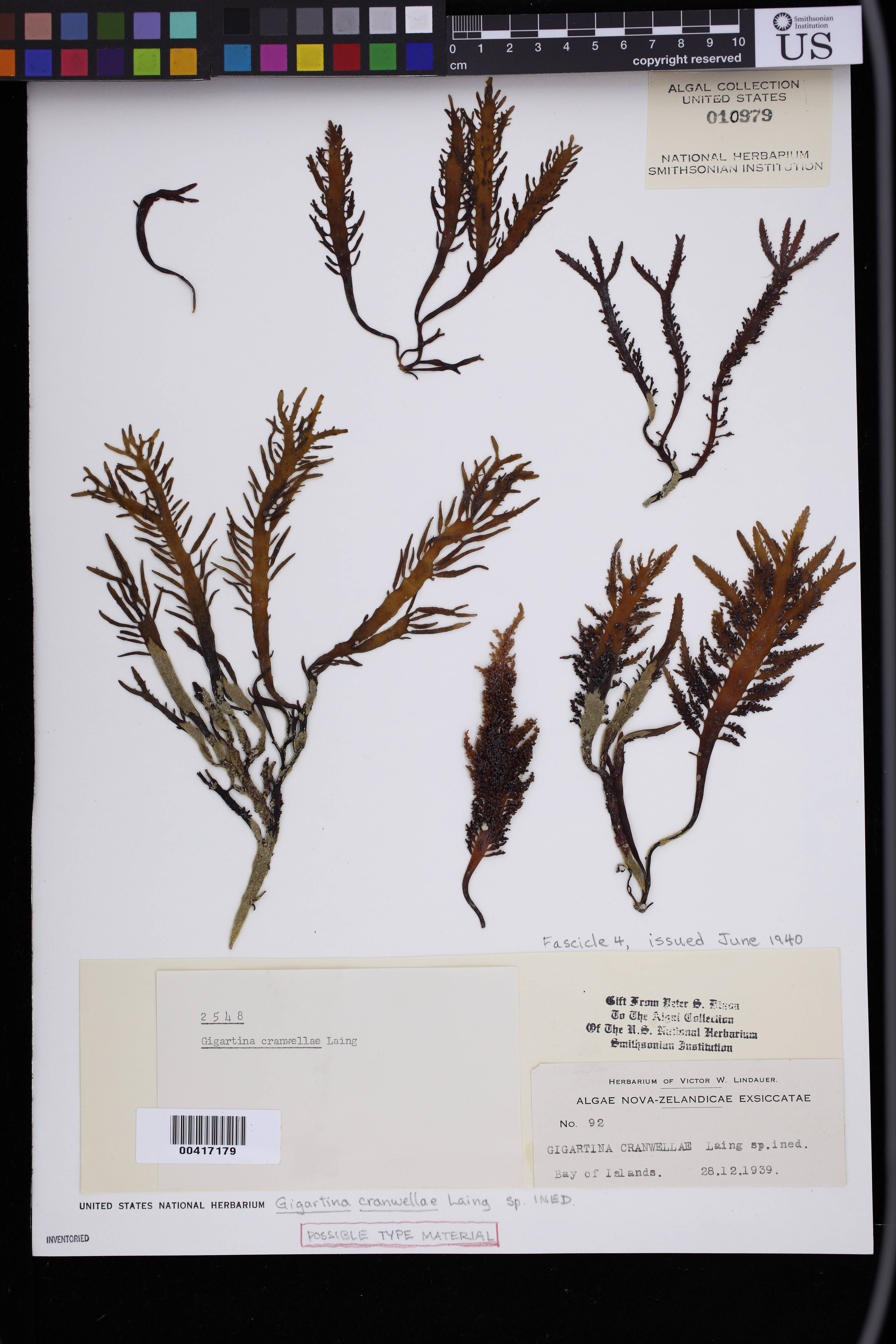
Gigartina cranwellae (US 10979)

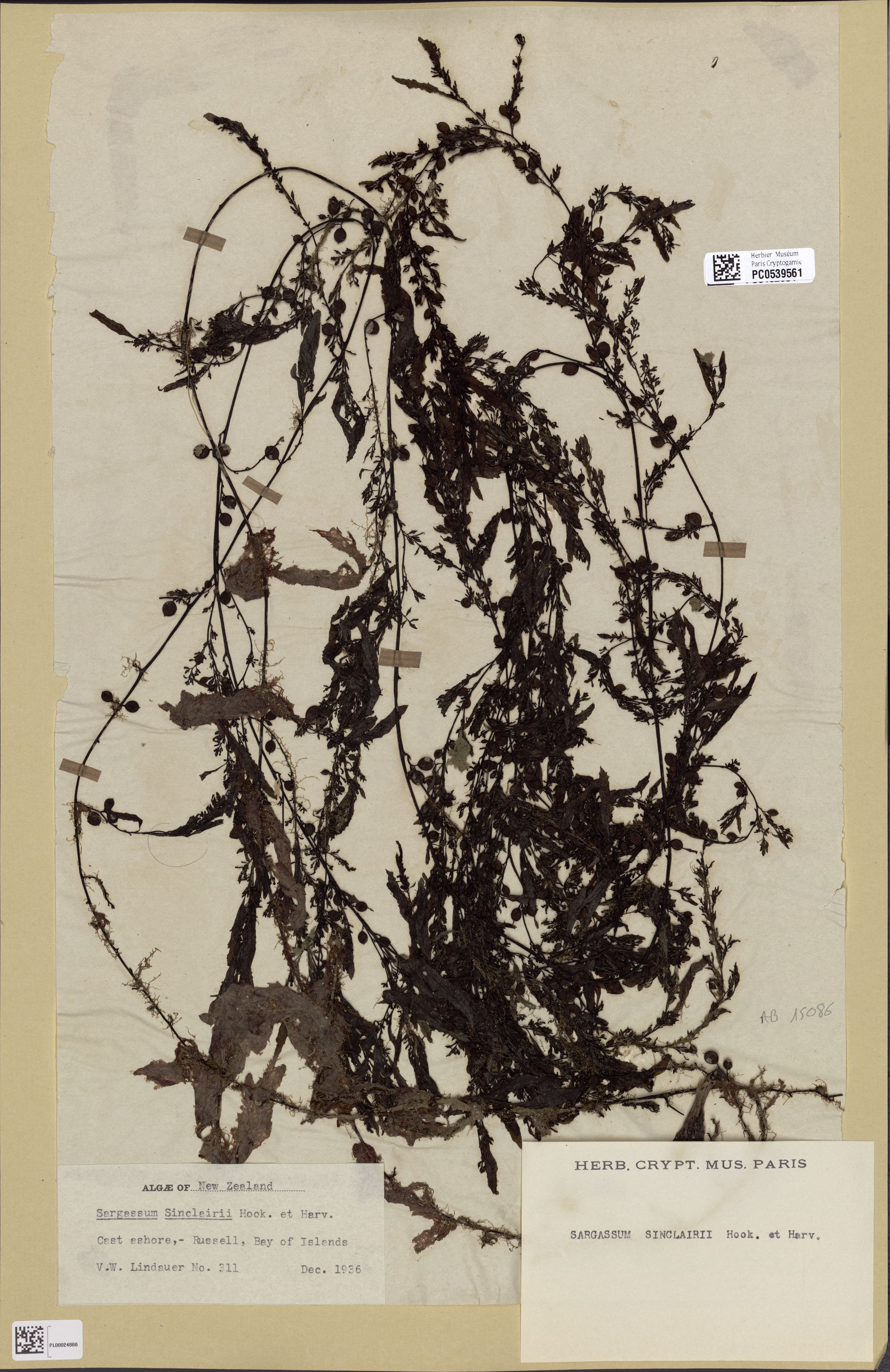
Sargasso sinclairii (MNHN PC0539561)

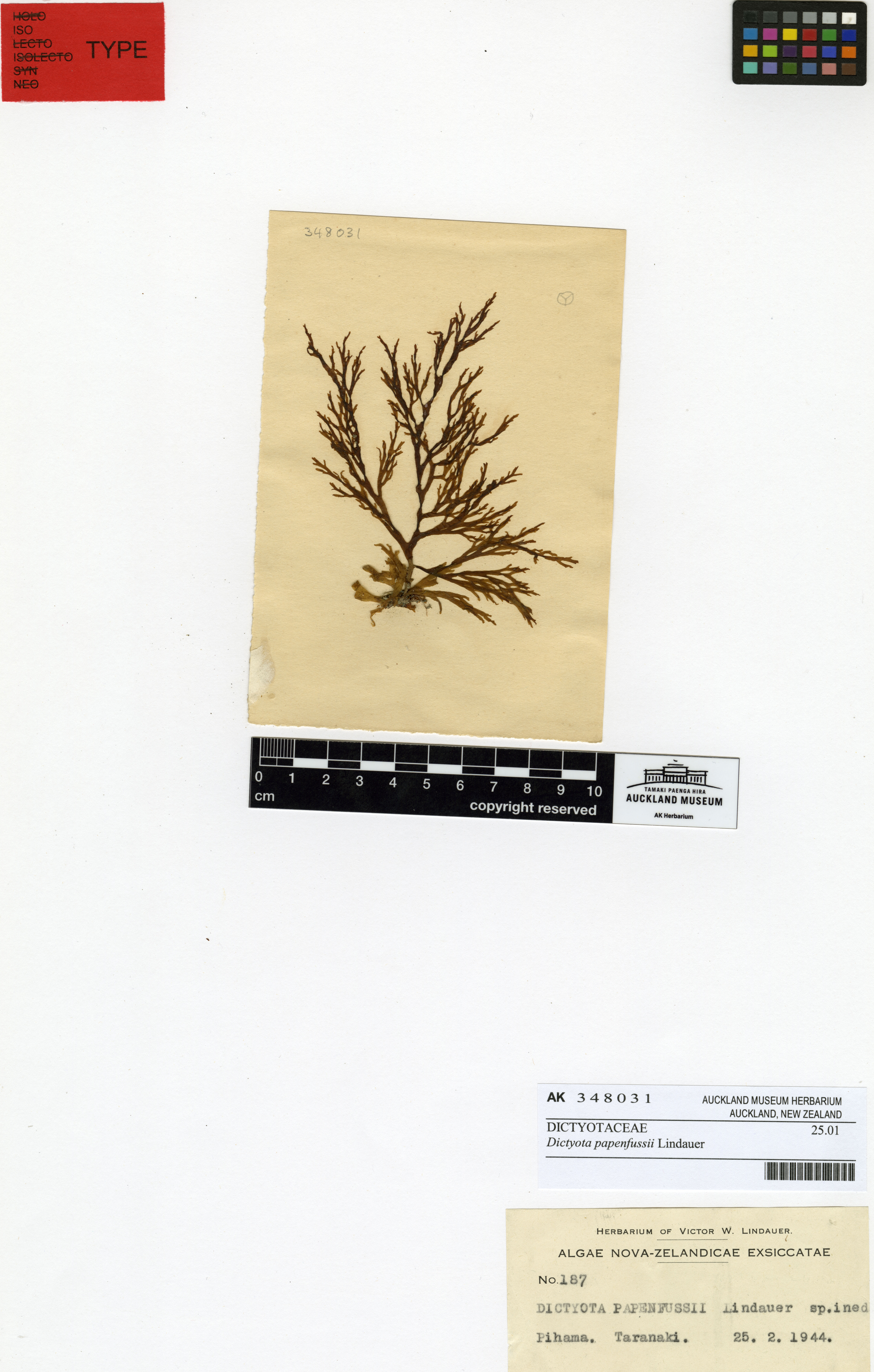
Dictyota papenfussii (AM AK348031)
