= Calocladia =

Scientific classification
- Kingdom: Fungi
- Division: Ascomycota
- Class: Leotiomycetes
- Order: Helotiales
- Family: Erysiphaceae
- Genus: Calocladia; Lév., 1851

Species
- Calocladia berberidis Lév.; Calocladia comata (Wallr.) Lév. 1851; Calocladia divaricata (Wallr.) Lév. 1851; Calocladia dubyi Lév. 1851; Calocladia ehrenbergii Lév. 1851; Calocladia friesii Lév. 1851; Calocladia grossulariae (Wallr.) Lév. 1851; Calocladia hedwigii Lév. 1851; Calocladia holosericea Lév.; Calocladia mougeotii Lév. 1851; Calocladia penicillata (Wallr.) Lév. 1851

Genus of fungi

Calocladia is a genus of fungi in the family Erysiphaceae.
