= Nägeli =

Surname list

Nägeli is a surname. Notable people with this surname include:

- Hans Franz Nägeli, also known as Hans Franz Nageli (1497–1579), Swiss politician and military leader
- Hans Georg Nägeli (1773–1836), Swiss composer and music publisher
- Carl Nägeli, also known as Carl Wilhelm von Nägel (1817–1891), Swiss botanist
- Otto Nägeli, also known as Otto Naegeli (1871–1938), Swiss hematologist
- Harald Nägeli, also known as Harald Naegeli (born 1938), Swiss artist
