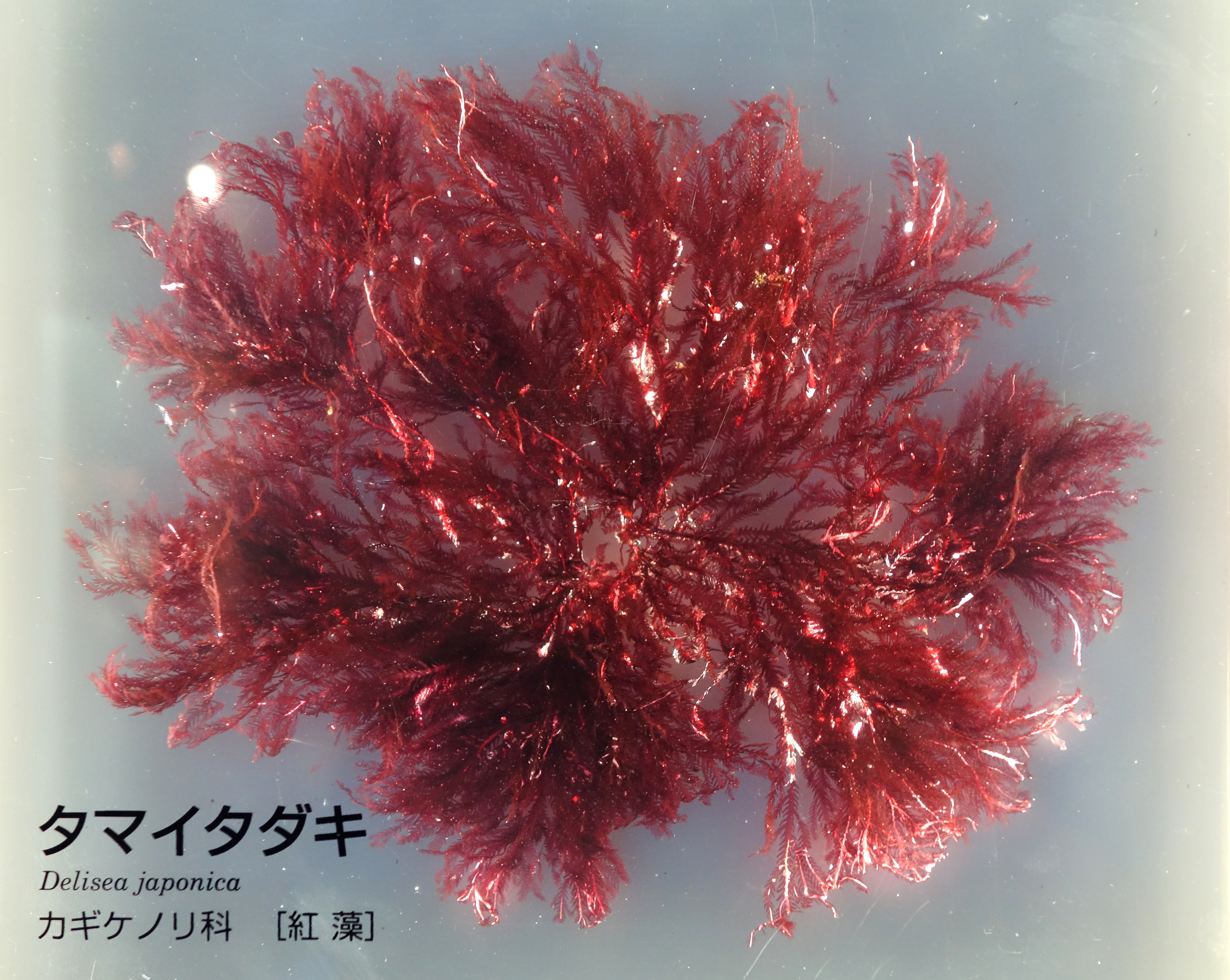
- Delisea japonica (Delisea pulchra) at the National Museum of Nature and Science, Tokyo

Scientific classification
- Clade: Archaeplastida
- Division: Rhodophyta
- Class: Florideophyceae
- Order: Bonnemaisoniales
- Family: Bonnemaisoniaceae; F.Schmitz

Genera
- Asparagopsis Montagne 1840; Bonnemaisonia C. Agardh, 1822; Delisea J.V.Lamouroux 1819; Leptophyllis J. Agardh, 1876; Pleuroblepharidella M. J. Wynne, 1980; Ptilonia (Harvey) J.Agardh 1852

= Bonnemaisoniaceae =

Family of algae

Bonnemaisoniaceae is a family of red algae in the order Bonnemaisoniales.
