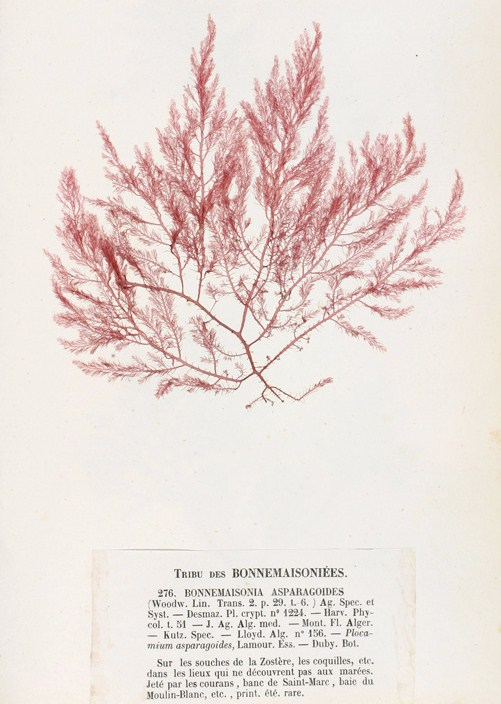
- Bonnemaisonia asparagoides

Scientific classification
- Clade: Archaeplastida
- Division: Rhodophyta
- Class: Florideophyceae
- Subclass: Rhodymeniophycidae
- Order: Bonnemaisoniales; J. Feldmann & G. Feldmann, 1965

= Bonnemaisoniales =

Order of algae

Bonnemaisoniales is an order of red algae in the class Florideophyceae.

It includes 2 families;

- Bonnemaisoniaceae F.Schmitz - 25 spp.
- Naccariaceae Kylin - 7 spp.

The order has cosmopolitan distribution.
