= Barleeia alderi =

- Shell of Barleeia alderi (specimen at Naturalis Biodiversity center)

Scientific classification
- Kingdom: Animalia
- Phylum: Mollusca
- Class: Gastropoda
- Subclass: Caenogastropoda
- Order: Littorinimorpha
- Family: Barleeiidae
- Genus: Barleeia
- Species: B. alderi

Binomial name
- Barleeia alderi (P. P. Carpenter, 1857)

Synonyms
- Jeffreysia alderi P. P. Carpenter, 1857

Species of gastropod

Barleeia alderi is a species of sea snail, a marine gastropod mollusc in the family Barleeiidae.

== Description ==
(Original description in Latin) It is similar to Jeffreysia bifasciata (synonym of Barleeia bifasciata (Carpenter, 1856)), but is more solid and much larger. It has five whorls that are more flattened, with narrow fascioles.

== Distribution ==
This marine species occurs in the Mazatlan Basin, Mexico.
