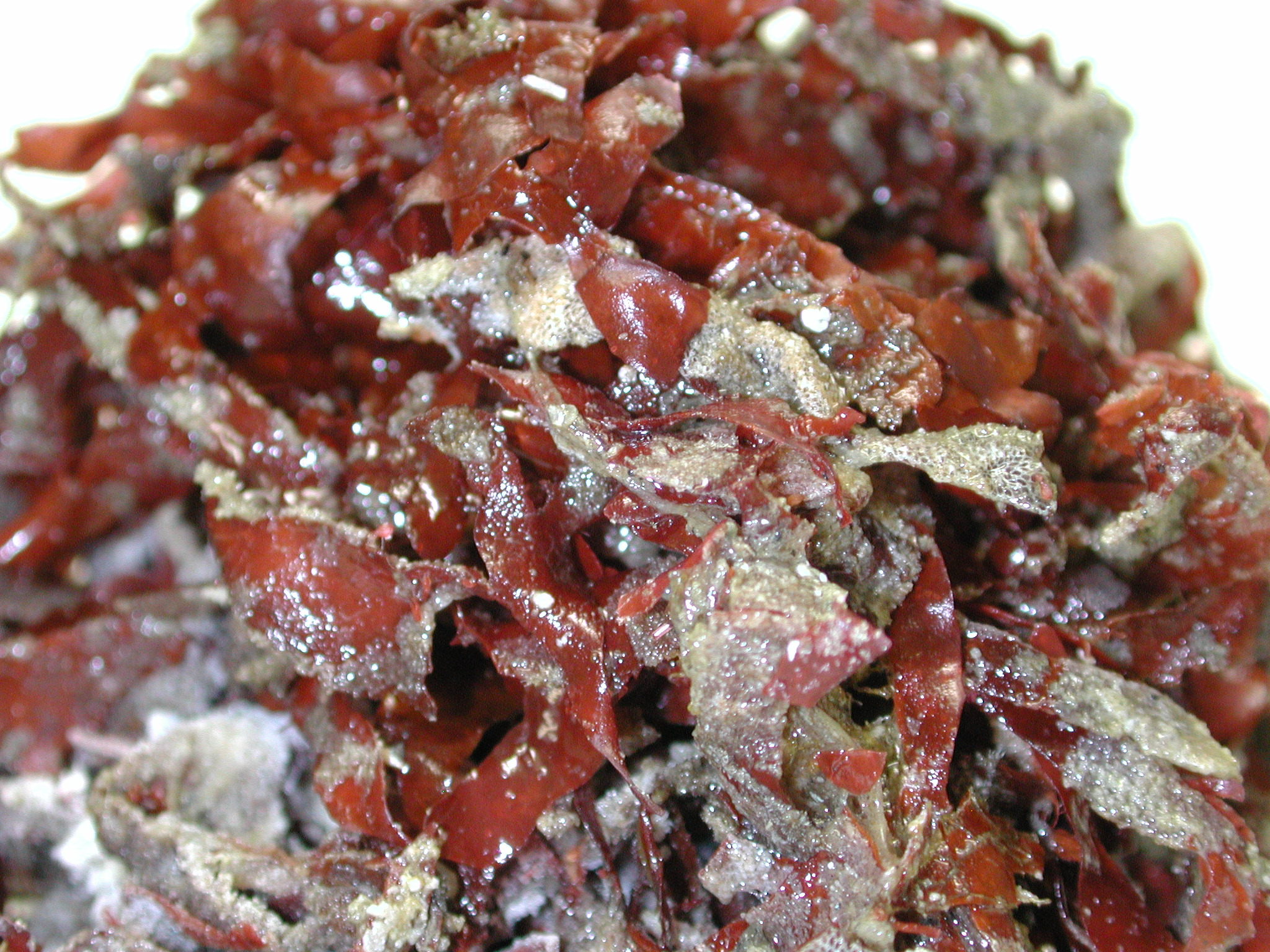
- Frozen sample of P. antarctica with serpulid worms

Scientific classification
- Domain: Eukaryota
- Clade: Archaeplastida
- Division: Rhodophyta
- Class: Florideophyceae
- Order: Gigartinales
- Family: Phyllophoraceae
- Genus: Phyllophora
- Species: P. antarctica

Binomial name
- Phyllophora antarctica A.Gepp & E.S.Gepp, 1905

= Phyllophora antarctica =

Species of red alga that grows on the underside of sea ice in Antarctica

Phyllophora antarctica is a species of red alga in the family Phyllophoraceae. It is native to Antarctica where it grows in dim light on the underside of sea ice. Some of it becomes detached and accumulates in drifts on the seabed. Many different organisms live attached to the fronds or among them.

== Distribution ==
P. antarctica is native to Antarctica. It is known from the Antarctic Peninsula, McMurdo Sound, the Ross Sea, South Georgia, Victoria Land and various subarctic islands. The type locality is Coulman Island near Cape Wadworth in the Ross Sea.

== Biology ==
In addition to chlorophyll a, P. antarctica has other biliprotein pigments, namely R-phycoerythrin, phycocyanin and allophycocyanin. These pigments give the seaweed a greater ability to utilise blue light in the dim sub-ice environment. The phycoerythrin absorbs the blue light energy and then transfers it to the other biliproteins from where it is passed on to the photosynthetic reaction centre, where it is turned into chemical energy.

== Ecology ==
P. antarctica reaches its greatest density in January, the Antarctic midsummer. In some locations such as at Cape Evans on Ross Island, P. antarctica is the main primary producer at depths between 10 and 30 m (30 and 100 ft). Some of it is attached, but most is drifting and accumulates on the sea bed. At first, the detached fronds are in good condition and photosynthesis continues, but over time they degrade and are gradually broken up. These beds of decaying algae have a substantial effect on the communities living on and under the seabed. Although the alga contains secondary metabolites which make it distasteful to herbivores, research has shown that polychaete worms and amphipods consume it to some extent, and the beds of drifting seaweed may help provide continuity of food supply for them during the dark Antarctic winter.

P. antarctica provides a large surface area on which other organisms can grow, and it has a rich and diverse associated fauna. In some circumstances, particularly when the Antarctic sea urchin (Sterechinus neumayeri) is restricting the algal growth, the biomass of the organisms living on the alga may exceed that of the alga itself. The species found attached or associated with the alga include the limpet Iothia emarginuloides, the amphipod Paramoera walkeri, various polychaete worms, and the Antarctic sea urchin. Other epiphytes include bryozoans, serpulid worms and hydroids, the latter being preyed on by the nudibranch Tenellia georgiana.
