= Phyllophora traillii =

Scientific classification
- Domain: Eukaryota
- Clade: Archaeplastida
- Division: Rhodophyta
- Class: Florideophyceae
- Order: Gigartinales
- Family: Phyllophoraceae
- Genus: Phyllophora
- Species: P. traillii

Binomial name
- Phyllophora traillii Holmes ex Batters

Species of alga

Phyllophora traillii is a small marine red alga.

== Description ==
Phyllophora traillii is a small alga no more than 35 mm long. It grows from a small holdfast and a short stipe up to three mm long which spreads to a small flat blade which is oblong or with parallel sides. It branches once or twice. The fronds are formed with a compact medulla of large cells with a cortex of small cells in two or three layers.

Phyllophora traillii is named for George William Traill a Scottish phycologist and mineralogist.

== Habitat ==
To be found growing on rock in the lower littoral into the sublittoral to a depth of 15 m.

== Reproduction ==
The gametangial plants are dioecious, that is with separate male and female plants.

== Distribution ==
Recorded from Great Britain, Ireland, Faeroes and the Atlantic coast of Europe from Sweden to France. Also from Canada and U.S.A.
