= Barleeia haliotiphila =

- Shell of Barleeia haliotiphila

Scientific classification
- Kingdom: Animalia
- Phylum: Mollusca
- Class: Gastropoda
- Subclass: Caenogastropoda
- Order: Littorinimorpha
- Family: Barleeiidae
- Genus: Barleeia
- Species: B. haliotiphila

Binomial name
- Barleeia haliotiphila P. P. Carpenter, 1864

Species of gastropod

Barleeia haliotiphila, common name the abalone barleysnail, is a species of sea snail, a marine gastropod mollusc in the family Barleeiidae.

This intertidal snail is one of the most common gastropods to be found in the biotic community at moderate tidal levels. Its diet consists of algae, such as Rhodoglossum affine, Mastocarpus papillatus, Gigartina leptorhynchos.

== Distribution ==
This marine species occurs off the west coast of North America.
