= Barleeia cinguloides =

- Shell of Barleeia cinguloides (specimen at MNHN, Paris)

Scientific classification
- Kingdom: Animalia
- Phylum: Mollusca
- Class: Gastropoda
- Subclass: Caenogastropoda
- Order: Littorinimorpha
- Family: Barleeiidae
- Genus: Barleeia
- Species: B. cinguloides

Binomial name
- Barleeia cinguloides Gofas, 1995

Species of gastropod

Barleeia cinguloides is a species of sea snail, a marine gastropod mollusc in the family Barleeiidae.

== Description ==
The length of the holotype attains 1.3 mm; its diameter 0.75 mm.

== Distribution ==
This marine species occurs in the Atlantic Ocean off Angola.
