= Barleeia carpenteri =

- Shell of Barleeia carpenteri (original image)

Scientific classification
- Kingdom: Animalia
- Phylum: Mollusca
- Class: Gastropoda
- Subclass: Caenogastropoda
- Order: Littorinimorpha
- Family: Barleeiidae
- Genus: Barleeia
- Species: B. carpenteri

Binomial name
- Barleeia carpenteri (Bartsch, 1920

Species of gastropod

Barleeia carpenteri is a species of sea snail, a marine gastropod mollusc in the family Barleeiidae.

== Description ==
The length of the shell attains 1.6 mm, its diameter 1.1 mm.

(Original description) This small shell contains 4.8 whorls. The shell is elongately ovate and white. It has two well-rounded nuclear whorls, which are marked by numerous pits arranged in axial and spiral series.

The post-nuclear whorls are narrowly and tabulately shouldered at the summit, more strongly so on the early whorls than on the last. They are well rounded and are marked by slender, curved incremental lines and fine spiral striae. The suture is well defined. The periphery of the last whorl is strongly rounded, while the base is moderately long and well rounded.

The aperture is ovate, with an obtuse posterior angle. The outer lip is thin at the edge. The inner lip is strongly curved and is appressed to the base for most of its length, remaining free only along the anterior fourth. The parietal wall is covered by a thick callus, which makes the peritreme complete. The summit of the body whorl falls slightly below the periphery at the aperture.

== Distribution ==
This marine species occurs in the Pacific Ocean off Lower California, USA and Mexico.
