= Barleeia taeniolata =

Scientific classification
- Kingdom: Animalia
- Phylum: Mollusca
- Class: Gastropoda
- Subclass: Caenogastropoda
- Order: Littorinimorpha
- Family: Barleeiidae
- Genus: Barleeia
- Species: B. taeniolata

Binomial name
- Barleeia taeniolata Gofas, 1995

Species of gastropod

Barleeia taeniolata is a species of sea snail, a marine gastropod mollusc in the family Barleeiidae.

== Description ==
The length of the holotype attains 1.6 mm; its diameter 1.05 mm.

== Distribution ==
This marine species occurs in Gulf of Guinea off São Tomé and Príncipe
