= Barleeia orcutti =

- Shell of Barleeia orcutti (original image)

Scientific classification
- Kingdom: Animalia
- Phylum: Mollusca
- Class: Gastropoda
- Subclass: Caenogastropoda
- Order: Littorinimorpha
- Family: Barleeiidae
- Genus: Barleeia
- Species: B. orcutti

Binomial name
- Barleeia orcutti (Bartsch, 1920

Species of gastropod

Barleeia orcutti is a species of sea snail, a marine gastropod mollusc in the family Barleeiidae.

== Description ==
The length of the shell attains 2.2 mm, its diameter 1.3 mm.

(Original description) The elongately ovalshell is very small and contains 5 1/2 whorls. The early whorls are white, while the posterior half of the body whorl is diffused with pale brown; the anterior portion is white. A broad, light-brown band crosses the middle of the base.

The protoconch contains almost two whorls. They are well rounded and marked by numerous small pits, which are arranged in more or less sinuous axial lines as well as in spiral series.

The post-nuclear whorls are rather inflated and well rounded. They are very narrowly shouldered at the summit and are marked by fine, retractively slanting incremental lines and exceedingly fine spiral striae. The suture is well defined. The periphery of the body whorl is well rounded, while the base is short, well rounded, and marked in the same manner as the spire.

The aperture is subcircular, with an obtuse posterior angle. The outer lip is thin. The basal and inner lips join in an even curve. The inner lip is free and curved, and it continues posteriorly into a parietal callus. This callus is partly free from the body wall and joins the posterior angle of the aperture, thereby rendering the peritreme complete.

The summit of the body whorl sinks slightly below the periphery at the aperture. The operculum is typical.

== Distribution ==
This marine species occurs in the Pacific Ocean off Lower California, USA and Mexico.
