= Barleeia sanjuanensis =

- Shell of Barleeia sanjuanensis (specimen at Naturalis Biodiversity Center)

Scientific classification
- Kingdom: Animalia
- Phylum: Mollusca
- Class: Gastropoda
- Subclass: Caenogastropoda
- Order: Littorinimorpha
- Family: Barleeiidae
- Genus: Barleeia
- Species: B. sanjuanensis

Binomial name
- Barleeia sanjuanensis Bartsch, 1920

Species of gastropod

Barleeia sanjuanensis is a species of sea snail, a marine gastropod mollusc in the family Barleeiidae.

== Description ==
The length of the shell attains 2.6 mm, its diameter 1.5 mm.

(Original description) The shell contains 5 1/2 whorls. The shell is broadly conical and chestnut brown, except for the nuclear whorls, which are pale brown. The two nuclear whorls are well rounded, and marked by numerous rather strong pits arranged in axial and spiral series.

The post-nuclear whorls are very slightly shouldered at the summit and well rounded. They are marked by numerous, rather coarse incised spiral lines. The periphery is obscurely angulated, and the suture is well defined. The base is well rounded and marked in the same manner as the spire.

The summit of the body whorl bends decidedly downward behind the aperture. The aperture is subcircular, with a decidedly obtuse posterior angle. The outer lip is rather thick, while the inner lip is strongly curved and appressed to the base. The parietal wall is covered by a thick callus, which makes the peritreme complete.

== Distribution ==
This marine species occurs in the Pacific Ocean off British Columbia, Canada
