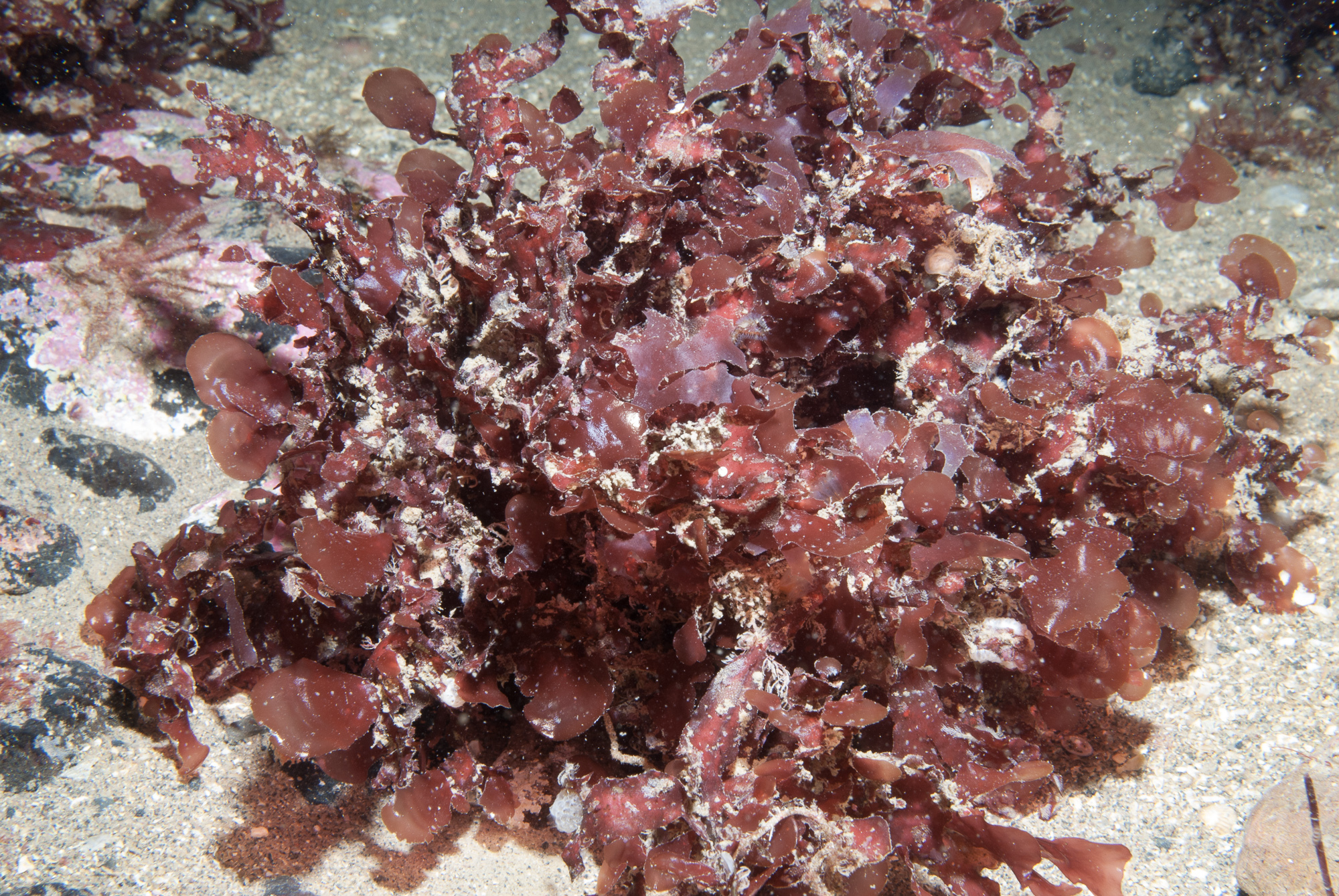
- Off Rathlin Island in Northern Ireland

Scientific classification
- Domain: Eukaryota
- Clade: Archaeplastida
- Division: Rhodophyta
- Class: Florideophyceae
- Order: Gigartinales
- Family: Phyllophoraceae
- Genus: Phyllophora
- Species: P. crispa

Binomial name
- Phyllophora crispa (Hudson) P.S.Dixon

= Phyllophora crispa =

Species of alga

Phyllophora crispa is a medium-sized fleshy, marine red alga. This alga forms dense mats of up to 15 cm thickness, which influence environmental factors, thus creating habitat for several associated organisms.

== Description ==
Phyllophora crispa is a perennial seaweed growing up to 15 cm (5.9 in) long. It grows from a short terete stipe. The frond is firm bright red in colour and with flattened parallel sides. It branches dichotomously the tips being rounded. It is cartilaginous with the medulla, the internal parts composed of large compact cells enclosed in two to four layers of smaller cells.

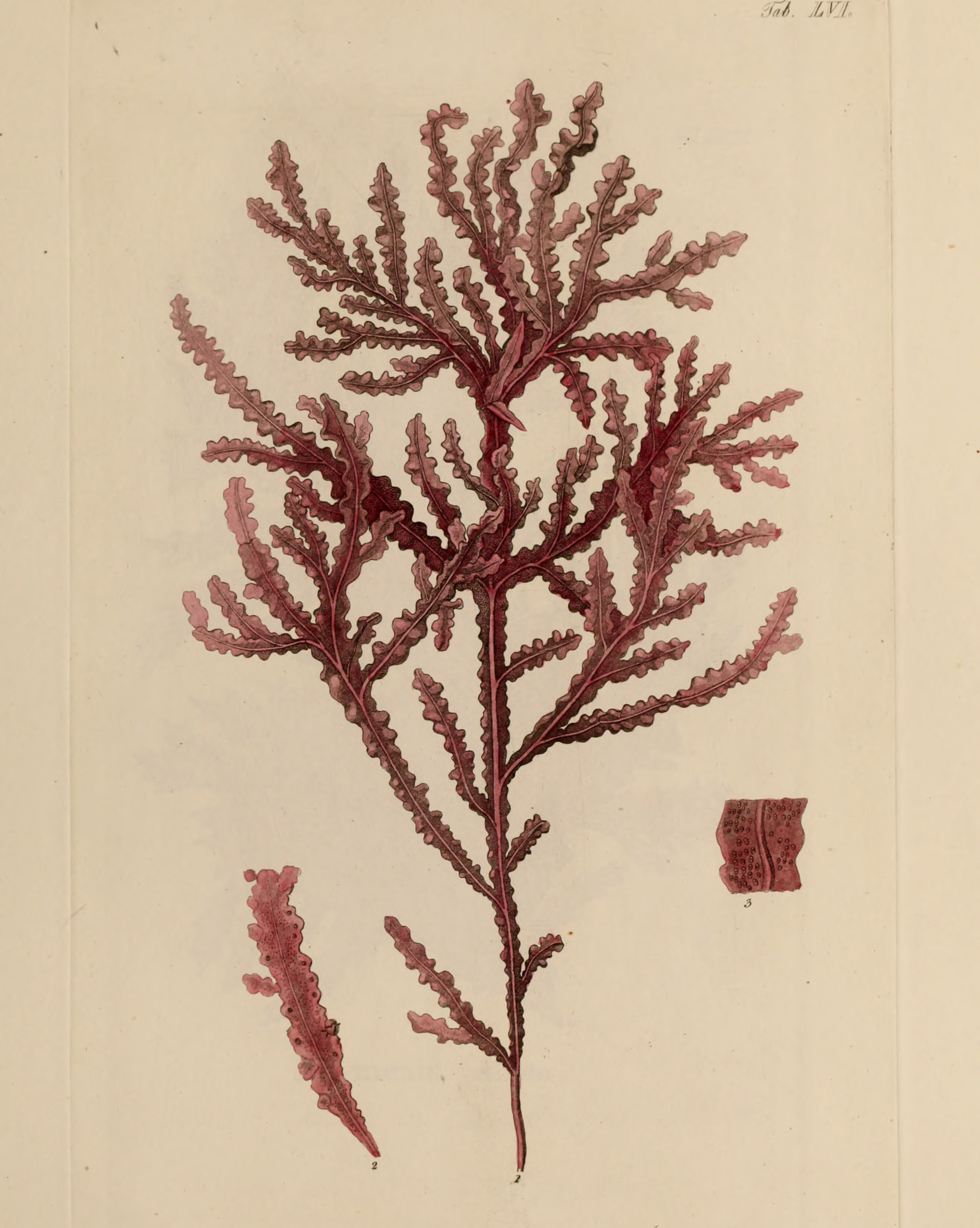
Illustration

== Reproduction ==
The sexes are dioecious, that is to be found on separate plants. The reproductive outgrowths occur on the blade surface, and the cystocarps are on short stalks on the thallus surface. The tetraspores are arranged in rows; on the surface of the stipe is special bladelets.

== Habitat ==
Epilithic, found deep rock pools in the lower littoral and to a depth of 30 m in the sublittoral.

== Distribution ==
Generally common around Ireland, Great Britain as far north as Shetland and the Isle of Man. Recorded also from Iceland, Norway, Portugal, Mediterranean and the Black Sea.
