= Barleeia multicolor =

- Shell of Barleeia multicolor (holotype at MNHN, Paris)

Scientific classification
- Kingdom: Animalia
- Phylum: Mollusca
- Class: Gastropoda
- Subclass: Caenogastropoda
- Order: Littorinimorpha
- Family: Barleeiidae
- Genus: Barleeia
- Species: B. multicolor

Binomial name
- Barleeia multicolor Rolán & Gori, 2014

Species of gastropod

Barleeia multicolor is a species of sea snail, a marine gastropod mollusc in the family Barleeiidae.

== Description ==
The length of the shell attains 1.9 mm.

== Distribution ==
This marine species occurs in the Gulf of Guinea off São Tomé Island
