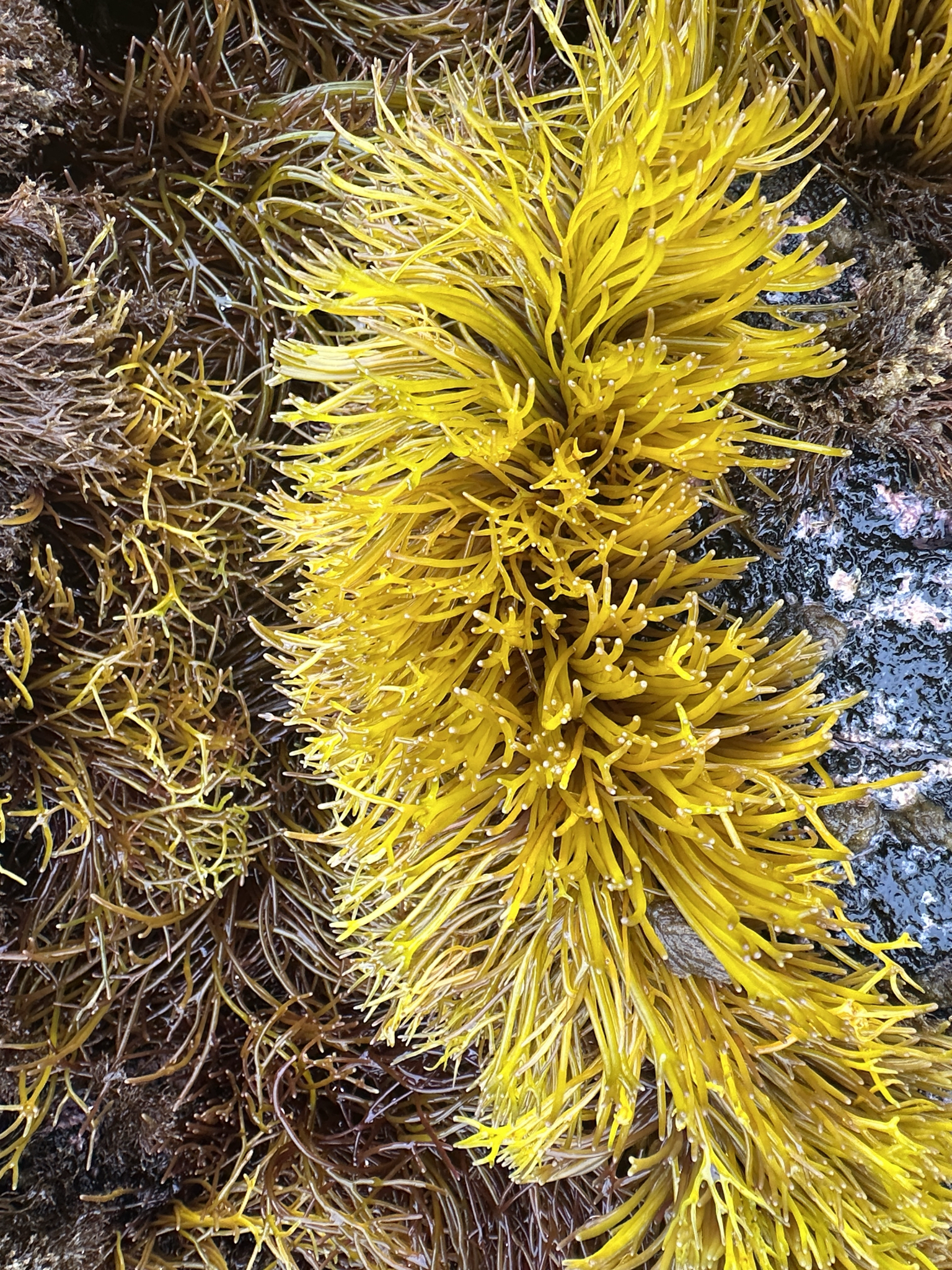

Scientific classification
- Domain: Eukaryota
- Clade: Archaeplastida
- Division: Rhodophyta
- Class: Florideophyceae
- Order: Gigartinales
- Family: Phyllophoraceae
- Genus: Gymnogongrus
- Species: G. durvillei

Binomial name
- Gymnogongrus durvillei (Bory) M.S.Calderon & S.M.Boo, 2017

Synonyms
- Polyides durvillei Bory, 1828

= Gymnogongrus durvillei =

Species of algae

Gymnogongrus durvillei is a species of red algae in the family Phyllophoraceae. Gymnogongrus durvillei is found in temperate marine environments, particularly in the intertidal and subtidal zones of rocky shorelines. Known for its feathery, bush-like appearance, it plays a vital role in coastal ecosystems, providing food and habitat for various marine organisms. This species is studied for its ecological importance and potential uses in both food and industry, particularly in Hawaii.

It was formerly known as Ahnfeltiopsis concinna before being reclassified to its current taxonomic position. It has also been classified as Gongrus durvillei in earlier literature. The reclassification of this species is attributed to recent advances in taxonomical and phylogenetic analysis of marine algae.

== Distribution and habitat ==
Gymnogongrus durvillei can be found across the Pacific along mostly temperate coasts, including Japan, New Zealand, Australia, and the Hawaiian Islands. In the Hawaiian islands, it is rare on O'ahu, common at Hanama'ulu, Kaua'i and common everywhere on Maui and Hawai'i island.

Gymnogongrus durvillei is commonly found on hard substrates such as rocks or other algae in areas with moderate wave action and steady nutrient availability. It is a key component of coastal ecosystems, contributing to biodiversity and providing shelter for a variety of marine organisms.

== Taxonomy ==
The history of Gymnogongrus durvillei is closely tied to its early documentation in marine botany. The species was initially described in the early 19th century, and its classification has undergone revisions as taxonomists studied its morphological and genetic traits. Earlier references in the scientific literature identified it under the genus Gongrus, later shifting to Ahnfeltiopsis and, most recently, Gymnogongrus. These changes reflect the advancement in the understanding of algal taxonomy, particularly the genetic differences between species in the Gongraceae family.

== Cultural significance ==
In Hawaiian traditions, seaweeds like Gymnogongrus durvillei have long been part of the local culture. The Polynesians, who first settled the Hawaiian Islands, recognized the importance of marine resources, including seaweed, in their diet and medicine. Gymnogongrus durvillei, like other red algae, became a staple in the local cuisine and was incorporated into traditional dishes such as limu poke. It was also used in medicinal practices, believed to have healing properties due to its nutrient content.

In Hawaii, Gymnogongrus durvillei (known locally as "limu" or seaweed) has been historically recognized for its utility in local cuisine, particularly in dishes that feature various edible seaweeds. Fortner's The Limu Eater (1985) highlights its inclusion in Hawaiian culinary practices, where its unique texture and flavor are valued.

In addition to its cultural and ecological roles, Gymnogongrus durvillei has been of interest in the field of biotechnology. Its unique texture and gelatinous properties have prompted studies into its potential uses as a gelling agent in food products, as well as in scientific applications such as microbiological research and pharmaceutical development.
