= Cythnia albida =

Scientific classification
- Kingdom: Animalia
- Phylum: Mollusca
- Class: Gastropoda
- Family: Rissoellidae
- Genus: Cythnia
- Species: C. albida

Binomial name
- Cythnia albida Carpenter, 1864

Species of gastropod

Cythnia albida is a species of sea snail, a marine gastropod mollusc in the family Rissoellidae. The species is one of two known species to exist within the genus, Cythnia, with the other one being Cythnia asteriaphila.
