= Barleeia bentleyi =

- Shell of Barleeia bentleyi (original image)

Scientific classification
- Kingdom: Animalia
- Phylum: Mollusca
- Class: Gastropoda
- Subclass: Caenogastropoda
- Order: Littorinimorpha
- Family: Barleeiidae
- Genus: Barleeia
- Species: B. bentleyi

Binomial name
- Barleeia bentleyi (Bartsch, 1920

Species of gastropod

Barleeia bentleyi is a species of sea snail, a marine gastropod mollusc in the family Barleeiidae.

== Description ==
The length of the shell attains 2.2 mm, its diameter 1.2 mm.

(Original description) The small shell contains 5 ⅓ whorls. The shell is conical, and flesh-coloured, except for the two whorls in the protoconch, which are light brown. These whorls are well rounded and are marked by curved axial rows of closely spaced pits. These pits are separated by spaces about one and a half times their own diameter.

The later whorls are moderately well rounded. The appressed summit of these whorls falls slightly below the peripheral keel, allowing the keel to appear in the suture as a slender thread. The surface of these whorls is marked by curved incremental lines and numerous fine, rather closely spaced spiral striae. A strong cord marks the periphery and gives it a decidedly angulated appearance.

The base is moderately long, well rounded, and marked in the same manner as the spire. The aperture is large, with an obtuse posterior angle. It is slightly effuse at the junction of the inner and basal lips. The outer lip is thin, while the inner lip is slender, oblique, and appressed to the base for most of its length; only the anterior portion is free. The parietal wall is covered by a thick callus, which makes the peritreme complete. The operculum is typical.

== Distribution ==
This marine species occurs in the Pacific Ocean off Canada, California, USA and Mexico.
