= Lirobarleeia gradata =

Scientific classification
- Kingdom: Animalia
- Phylum: Mollusca
- Class: Gastropoda
- Subclass: Caenogastropoda
- Order: Littorinimorpha
- Family: Barleeiidae
- Genus: Lirobarleeia
- Species: L. gradata

Binomial name
- Lirobarleeia gradata (d’Orbigny, 1842)

Synonyms
- Alvania gradata (d'Orbigny, 1842); Rissoa gradata d'Orbigny, 1842 (original combination)

Species of gastropod

Lirobarleeia gradata is a species of small sea snail, a marine gastropod mollusk or micromollusk in the family Barleeiidae.
