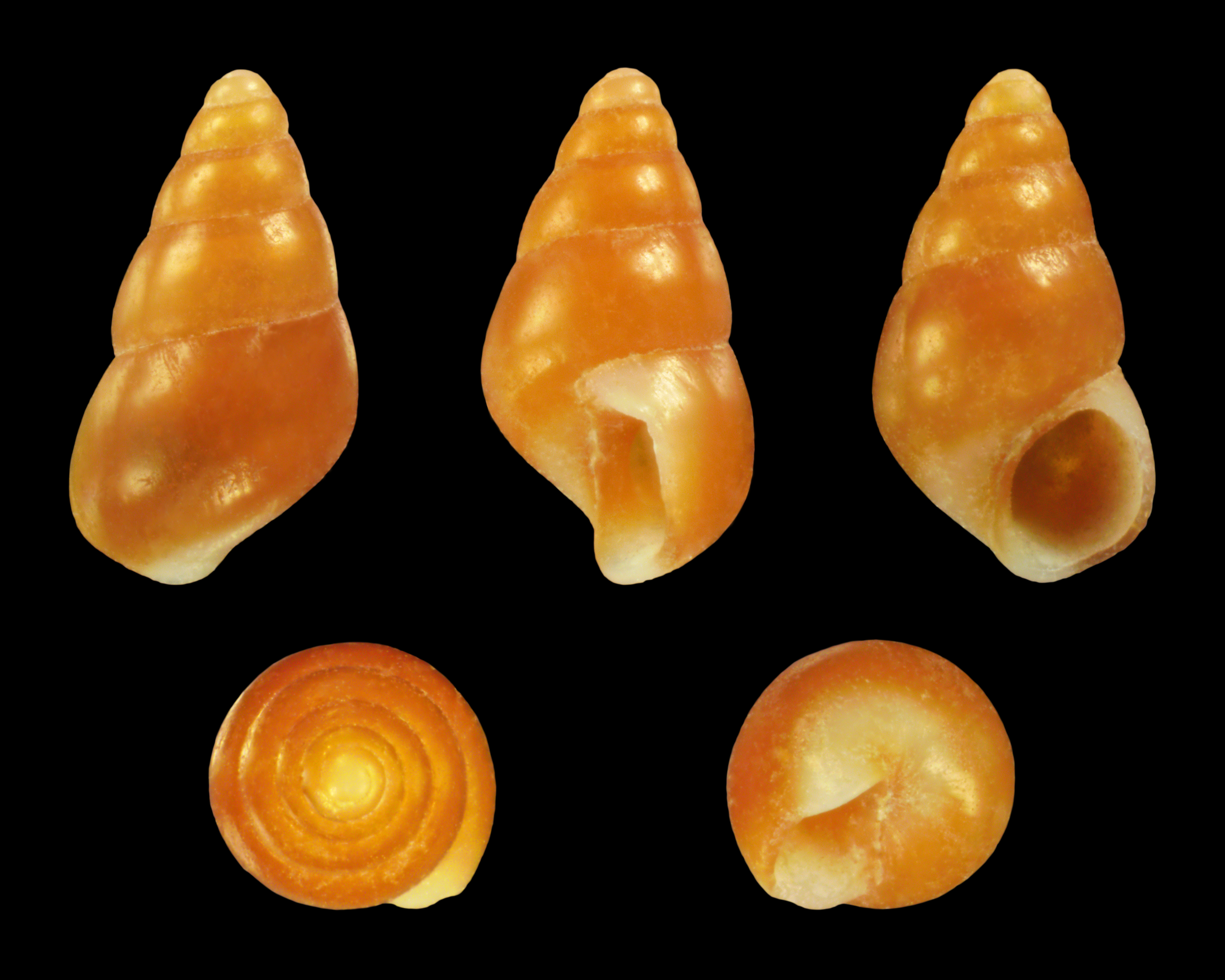
- Shell of Barleeia unifasciata

Scientific classification
- Kingdom: Animalia
- Phylum: Mollusca
- Class: Gastropoda
- Subclass: Caenogastropoda
- Order: Littorinimorpha
- Family: Barleeiidae
- Genus: Barleeia
- Species: B. unifasciata

Binomial name
- Barleeia unifasciata (Montagu, 1803)

Synonyms
- Barleeia rubra W. Clark, 1853 junior subjective synonym; Barleeia rubra (J. Adams, 1797) junior homonym (non Turbo ruber von Salis, 1793); Barleeia rubra var. elongata Bucquoy, Dautzenberg & Dollfus, 1884 junior subjective synonym; Barleeia rubra var. pallida Jeffreys, 1867 junior subjective synonym; Rissoa auranthiaca Brusina, 1866 nomen nudum; Rissoa fulva Michaud, 1830 junior subjective synonym; Sabanaea binghamiana Leach, 1852 junior subjective synonym; Sabanea binghamiana Leach, 1852 junior subjective synonym; Turbo ruber J. Adams, 1797 junior homonym (of Turbo ruber von Salis, 1793); Turbo unifasciatus Montagu, 1803 superseded combination

= Barleeia unifasciata =

Species of gastropod

Barleeia unifasciata is a species of sea snail, a marine gastropod mollusc in the family Barleeiidae.

== Description ==
(Original description) The shell is smooth, conical, and white. It bears one—and rarely two—purplish-brown bands on the body whorl, one on the second whorl of the spire, and sometimes also one on the third. The shell has five whorls.

When two fasciae occur on the lower part of the spire, they occupy no more space than a single fascia. The whorls of the spire are very slightly raised and are separated only by a fine line. The bands on the upper whorls lie close to this separating line.

The aperture is suboval. The outer lip is thin and turns outwards. The inner lip spreads over the columella. The shell is imperforate.

(Described as Barleeia rubra W. Clark, 1853) The shell is plain red-brown and smooth, or only slightly wrinkled. It consists of 4½ to 5½ tumid whorls, which form a rapidly increasing cone. The aperture is oval, entire, contracted above, and rounded basally. The outer margin is sharp and lacks the callous pad characteristic of the Rissoidae. The axis measures 1/10 inch (2.54 mm), and the diameter 1/17 inch (1.5 mm).

Animal. The mantle is plain and level with the margin of the shell. It lacks the filament seen at the upper angle of the aperture in many of the Rissoidae. The rostrum is very short; it is neither corrugated nor capable of much extension. Its upper surface is brindled with fine, irregular, closely set dark smoke-coloured lines, while its lower surface is pale yellow. The buccal disk is of the same colour, has a small area, and is cleft both crosswise and lengthwise. It contains the usual masticatory processes of the Littorinidae. The neck is dark, though not as dark as the rostrum; it is quite plain and bears no appendages.

The tentacles are very short, strong, and broad. They are not at all setaceous and have perfectly rounded, somewhat spatulate extremities. They are not vibrated during locomotion. Their colour is very pale yellowish white, with a central line of sulphur-coloured beads or minute flakes running from the base to the tip. The eyes are very large and black, and are fixed on bright sulphur-coloured swellings at the external bases of the tentacles.

The foot is an elongated, rather narrow oval. It is rounded anteriorly and labiated, with scarcely perceptible auricular points. Posteriorly, it is rounded and emarginate at the centre of its termination. The upper part of the foot is confusedly flake-white in the middle and is margined by a belt of pale smoke colour. The sole is pale yellow and bears a distinct, depressed longitudinal line along the centre of its posterior half. It is not constricted beneath the slight auricles, as in Rissoa, and is not so slender.

The operculigerous lobe is small and is only very slightly alate anteriorly. Below, it expands into a dark, flat, arcuate membrane. No cirrus is visible, and probably none exists. The animal carries a strong, red-brown, suboval, testaceous operculum. It is sharp above, rounded below and along the outer edge, and straighter on the columellar side.

The fine striae on the upper surface of the operculum have a subannular pattern. A longitudinal furrow runs about the middle and forms a raised rib on the underside. The whole of that area is thick, coarse, and irregular. At the nucleus, which lies nearer the base than the centre, there is a long, strong, pointed, testaceous apophysis. It is more prominent than in Jeffreysia, but not so median in position; it is, however, stronger and longer—indeed, as much so as in some species of Chemnitzia.

These animals inhabit the lower littoral levels. Their locomotion is deliberate, and they show considerable shyness. There are many fasciated varieties, as well as a white variety.

== Distribution ==
This marine species occurs from Shetland into Mediterranean; also off the Canary Islands
