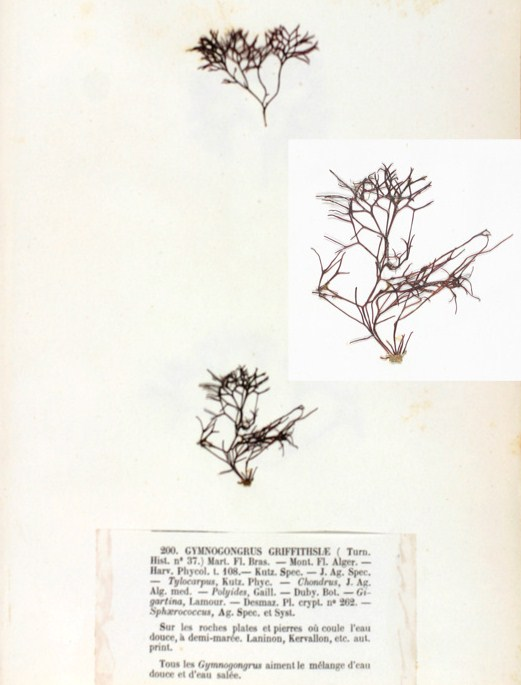

Scientific classification
- Clade: Archaeplastida
- Division: Rhodophyta
- Class: Florideophyceae
- Order: Gigartinales
- Family: Phyllophoraceae
- Genus: Gymnogongrus
- Species: G. griffithsiae

Binomial name
- Gymnogongrus griffithsiae (Turner) C.Martius

= Gymnogongrus griffithsiae =

Species of seaweed

Gymnogongrus griffithsiae is a small uncommon seaweed.

== Description ==
This small alga grows to 5 cm long from a small disc. The fronds are erect, stiff and branch dichotomously in 1 plane, the tips a little flattened. In colour it is dark purplish brown. The structure is multiaxial with elongated cells surrounded cortical cells.

== Reproduction ==
Male spermatangia are unknown. Carpotetasporangial outgrowths, that is sporangia containing four spores, by a carposporophyte outgrowth which develops during the year.

== Distribution ==
Found in Great Britain and Ireland with a southern range, as far north as Lough Swilly. In the north Atlantic in the Azores in Europe to Massachusetts to Virginia in North America.

== Habitat ==
The plants grow in rock pools of the lower littoral and in the upper sublittoral.

== Possible confusion ==
This species is similar to Ahnfeltia plicata which usually has wiry irregular branching.
