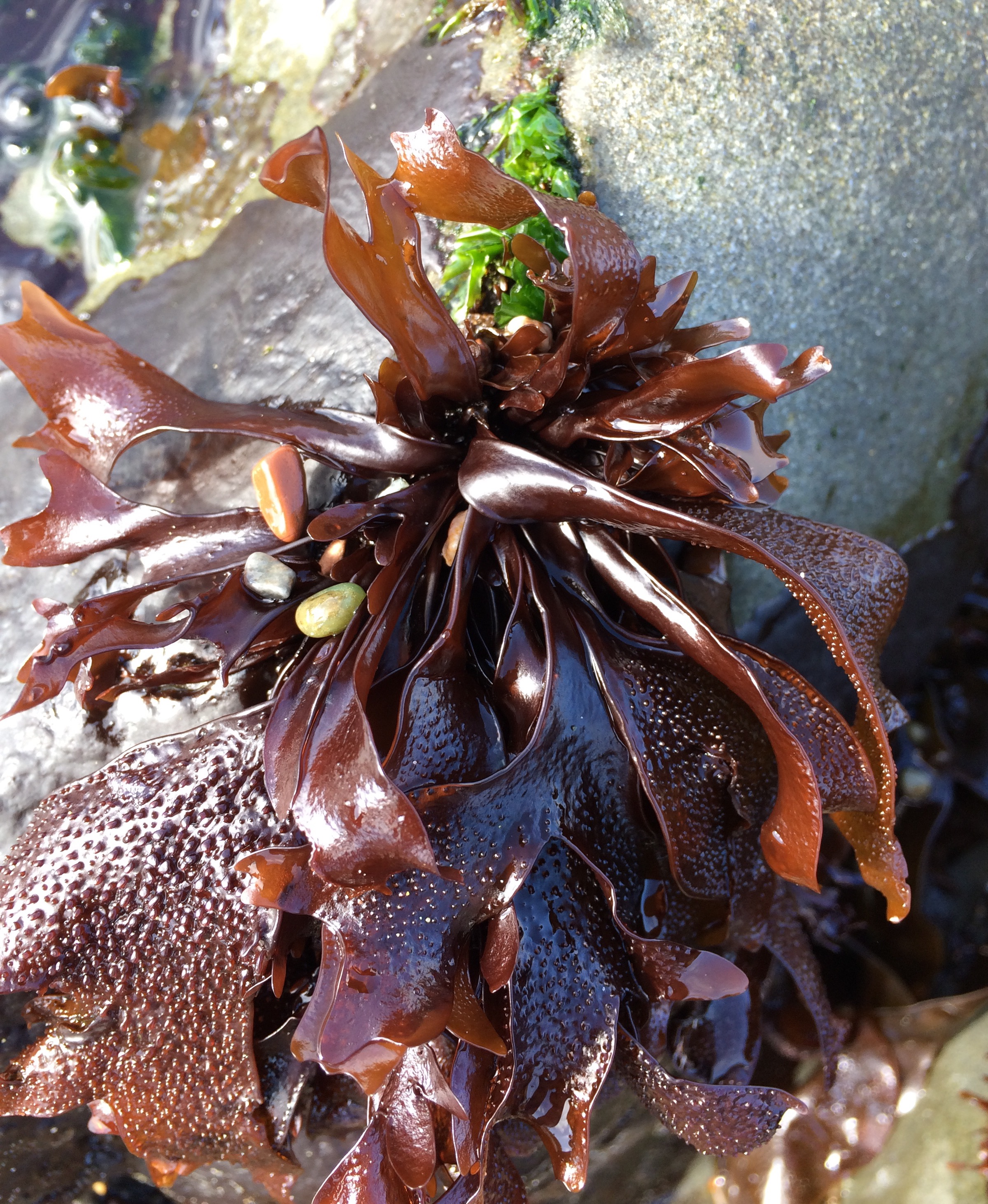
- Turkish washcloth

Scientific classification
- Domain: Eukaryota
- Supergroup: Archaeplastida
- Division: Rhodophyta
- Class: Florideophyceae
- Order: Gigartinales
- Family: Phyllophoraceae
- Genus: Mastocarpus
- Species: M. papillatus

Binomial name
- Mastocarpus papillatus (C.Agardh) Kützing 1843

Synonyms
- Chondrus mamillosus var. sitchensis Ruprecht 1850; Gigartina kuetzingii Setchell & N.L.Gardner 1933; Gigartina obovata J.Agardh 1899; Gigartina papillata (C.Agardh) J.Agardh 1846; Gigartina papillata var. obovata (J.Agardh) M.S.Doty 1947; Gigartina sitchensis (Ruprecht) Yendo 1916; Iridaea papillata (C.Agardh) Greville 1830; Petrocelis franciscana Setchell & N.L.Gardner 1917; Sphaerococcus papillatus C.Agardh 1821

= Mastocarpus papillatus =

Species of red algae

Mastocarpus papillatus, sometimes called Turkish washcloth, black tar spot, or grapestone is a species of red algae in the family Phyllophoraceae. It is sometimes confused with the distantly related Turkish towel (Chondracanthus exasperatus) which is of a similar texture but larger. The specific epithet papillatus ('with papillae') is due to the nipple-like projections on the female gametophyte which can give the texture of a terrycloth washcloth found at a hamam (Turkish bathhouse).

== Distribution ==
Despite the common name, it grows nowhere near Turkey. It is instead native to the northeastern Pacific Ocean and commonly can be found in California, Oregon, Washington, British Columbia, and Alaska. It has been found growing as far north as the Commander Islands and the Russian Far East, and as far south as Chile.

== Habitat ==
It grows on rocky substrates in the high- to mid-intertidal zones and has been found growing at depths of 250 m. Like many red algae species, it uses phycoerythrin to photosynthesize which allows it to grow deeper than plants using other pigments.

== Description ==
Turkish washcloth is reddish-brown to almost black, with males paler than females and lacking the signature papillae on the blades. The blades are branched and small at less than 15 cm long, as one would expect to a plant with a diminutive common name. The first blades in the spring are thin, purple and lack papillae. Later in the year the thalli dry out and become grey and lifeless.

Mastocarpus jardinii is a similar species, and can be confused with M. papillatus. Mazzaella affinis thalli looks similar in shape and color to male M. papillatus, but are smaller and grow in thick mats and not as individuals. It also can be confused with other species with Petrocelis phases, such as Pikea, other Mastocarpus spp., Ralfisa, and Hildenbrandia, thought the last two are thinner than the Turkish towel crust.

== Life cycle ==
M. papillatus has a relatively complex reproductive cycle. Male gametophytes discharge nonflagellated sperm to drift in the current until they attach to the trichogynes of female plants. There the sperm perform mitosis without cell division, turning into a spermatium. Fertilisation then proceeds through a fertilization pore between the trichogyne and the spermatium. The eggs then grow into tetrasporophytes which are more or less copies of their parents.

Alternately, the tetrasporophyte goes through the Petrocelis phase (so named as it was thought to be a distinct genus, Petrocelis, of Phyllophoraceae) and grows into a crust that looks like spilled tar, inspiring the black tar spot common name. The tetrasporophyte undergoes meiosis and produce tetrasporangia which release spores to germinate elsewhere. Eventually the crust grows into a typical adult plant. This crustose phase is shared by all members of the genus Mastocarpus as well as those in Pikea.

== Ecology ==
Turkish washcloth is food for many animals, including Echinolittorina ziczac, Littorina, Amphipoda, Lottia, Pholis crassispina, Lottia scutum, Trochidae, Lacuna vincta, Stenosoma, Mopalia swanii, and Cryptochiton stelleri.

Like the Porphyra species used to make nori, M. papillatus is susceptible to infection by the parasitic oomycete Pythium porphyrae, or red rot disease, which can kill large colonies. It is also susceptible to infection by Pythium marinum.

== Uses ==
Grapestone is edible and can be cooked in soups or stir-fries but care must be taken as overcooking can turn the plant mushy and gelatinous. This property can be exploited to use it as a thickening agent like its close relative Mastocarpus stellatus. Grapestone has a similar flavor to oysters.

Grapestone is easily foraged from the shore, but like any wild species overharvesting is possible. By grabbing the longer blades and pulling sideways, the shorter blades and holdfast may remain on the rock and live on.

M. papillatus is also thought to have antimicrobial properties.

== Gallery ==
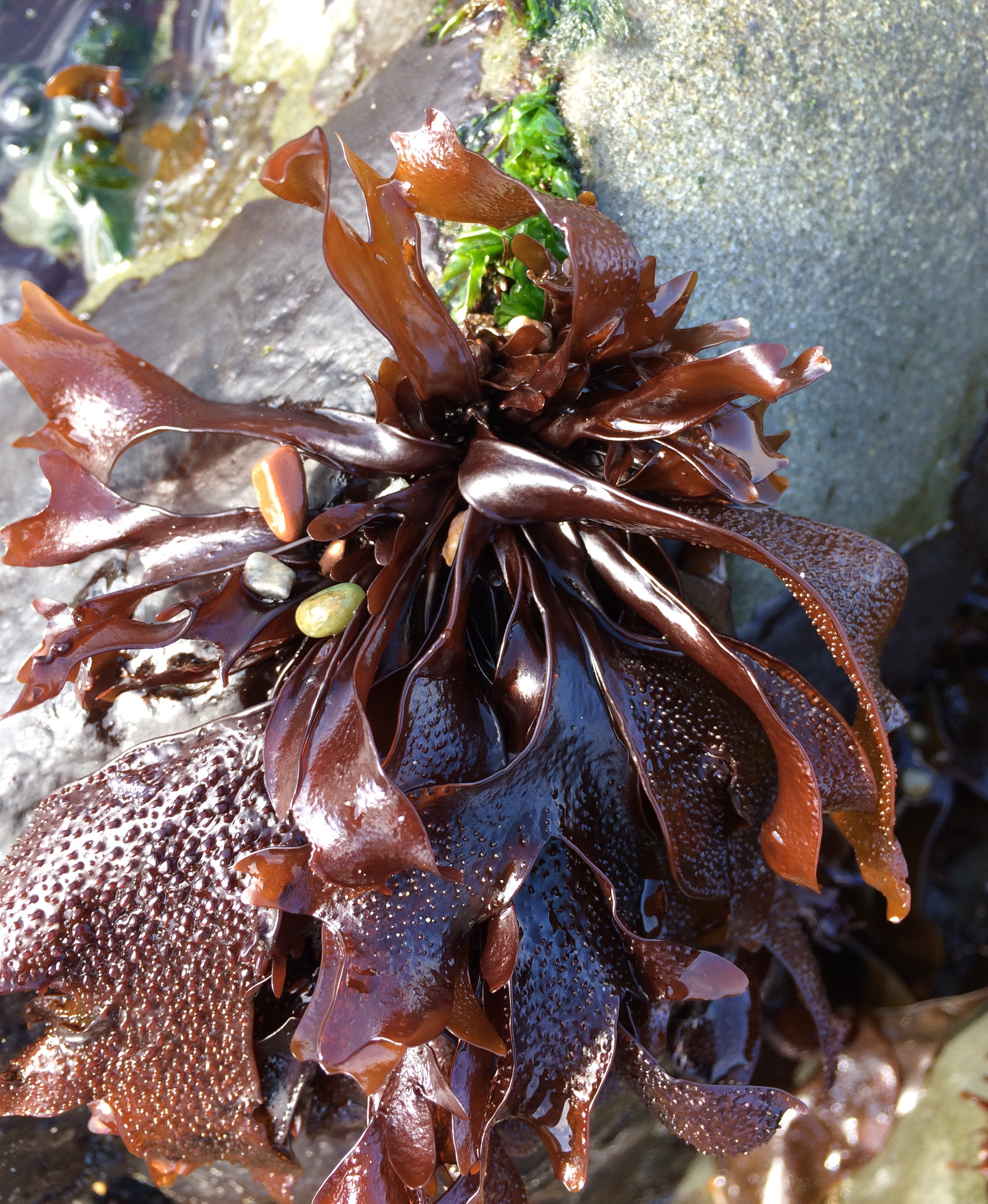

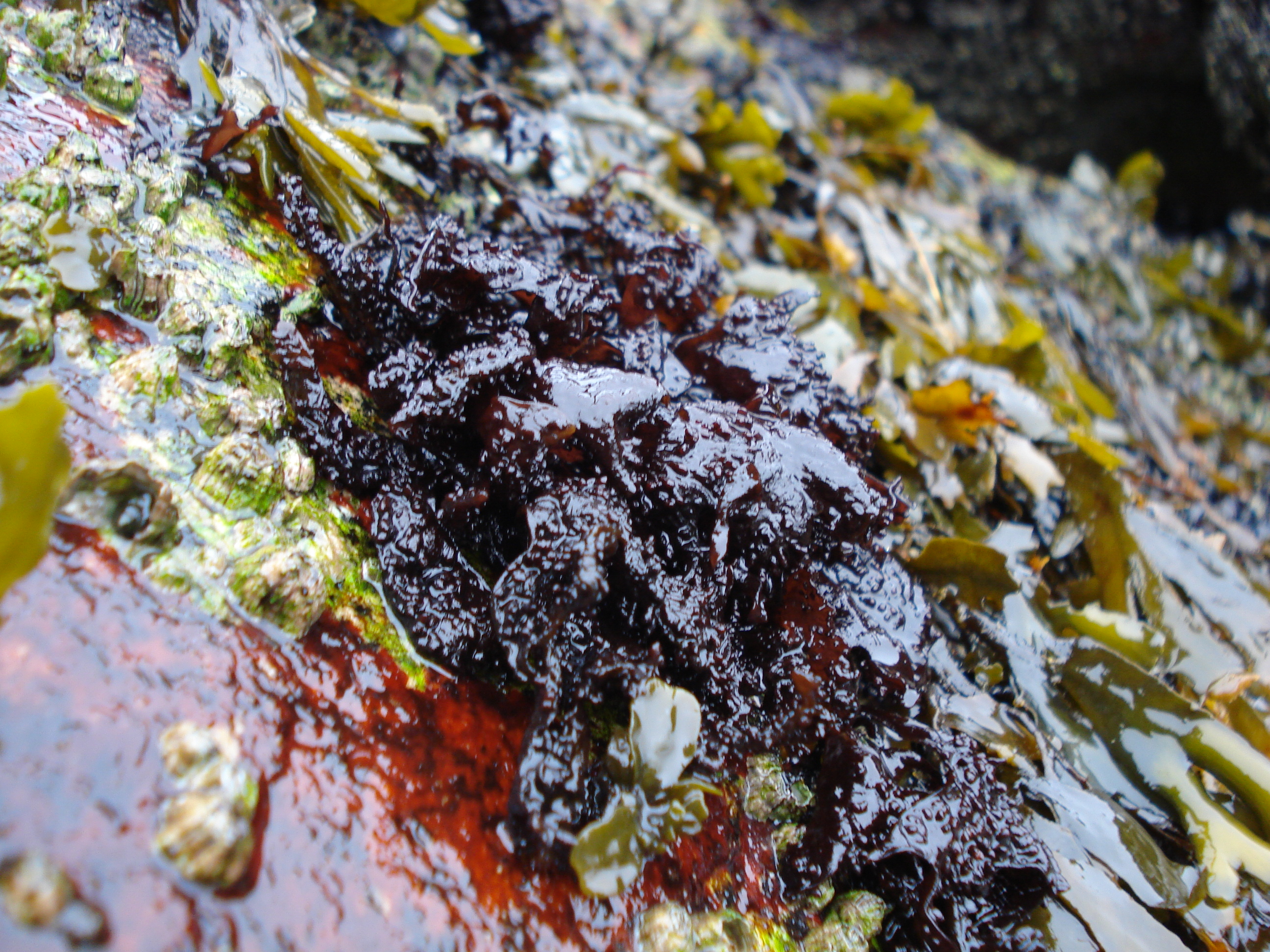

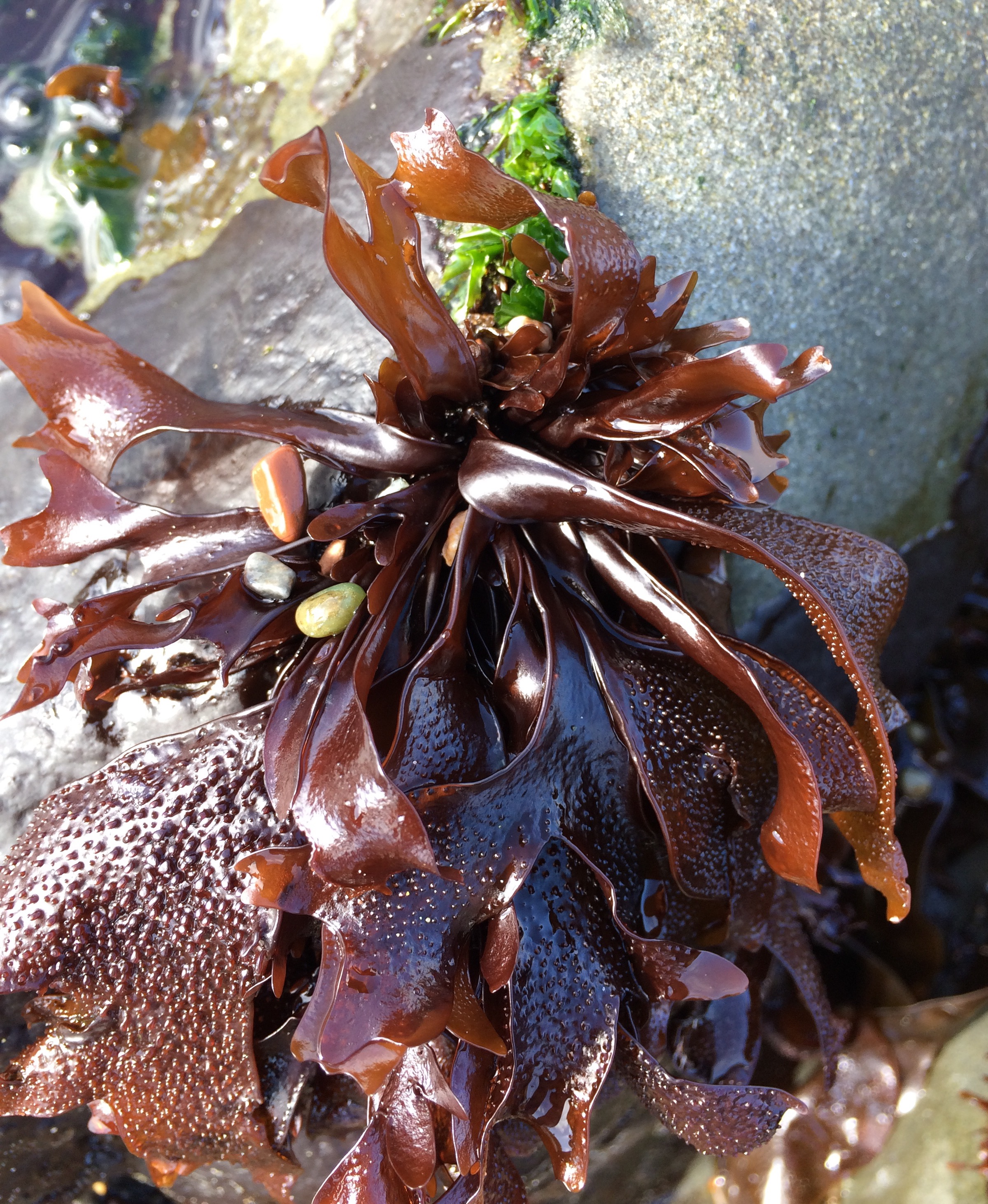
