= Barleeia annamitica =

- Shell of Barleeia annamitica (specimen at the Natural History Museum, Rotterdam)

Scientific classification
- Kingdom: Animalia
- Phylum: Mollusca
- Class: Gastropoda
- Subclass: Caenogastropoda
- Order: Littorinimorpha
- Family: Barleeiidae
- Genus: Barleeia
- Species: B. annamitica

Binomial name
- Barleeia annamitica (Dautzenberg & H. Fischer, 1907)

Synonyms
- Amphithalamus annamiticus (Dautzenberg & H. Fischer, 1907) superseded combination; Cingula annamitica Dautzenberg & Fischer, 1907 superseded combination

Species of gastropod

Barleeia annamitica is a species of sea snail, a marine gastropod mollusc in the family Barleeiidae.

== Description ==
(Original description in Latin) Dimensions: Height, 1.4 mm; maximum diameter, 0.9 mm; aperture, 0.6 mm high and 0.5 mm wide.

The shell is minuscule, glossy, and imperforate, with an oval-conical shape. The spire is moderately elevated and obtuse at the apex. It consists of four convex whorls, separated by a slightly canaliculate suture. The first two whorls are smooth, while the remaining whorls show only weak, arched growth striae.

The aperture is rounded and has a continuous peristome. The columella is arched and very slightly reflected. The outer lip is simple and arched.

The colour is pale pinkish grey, with two poorly defined, tawny, descending bands on the body whorl, one of which lies below the periphery. The upper whorls are rather dark tawny.

== Distribution ==
This marine species occurs off South-East Asia (Vietnam, China)
