= Cythnia asteriaphila =

Scientific classification
- Kingdom: Animalia
- Phylum: Mollusca
- Class: Gastropoda
- Family: Rissoellidae
- Genus: Cythnia
- Species: C. asteriaphila

Binomial name
- Cythnia asteriaphila Carpenter, 1864

Species of gastropod

Cythnia asteriaphila is a species of sea snail, a marine gastropod mollusc in the family Rissoellidae. The species is one of two known species to exist within the genus, Cythnia, the other one is Cythnia albida.

== Distribution ==
This species is mainly distributed off the coasts of America in the Pacific Ocean and the Atlantic Ocean.
