= Barleeia oldroydi =

- Shell of Barleeia oldroydi (specimen at naturalis Biodiversity Center)

Scientific classification
- Kingdom: Animalia
- Phylum: Mollusca
- Class: Gastropoda
- Subclass: Caenogastropoda
- Order: Littorinimorpha
- Family: Barleeiidae
- Genus: Barleeia
- Species: B. oldroydi

Binomial name
- Barleeia oldroydi Bartsch, 1920

Species of gastropod

Barleeia oldroydi is a species of sea snail, a marine gastropod mollusc in the family Barleeiidae.

== Description ==
The length of the shell attains 3.3 mm, its diameter 1.5 mm.

(Original description) The shell contains 6.1 whorls. The shell is narrowly conical and light chestnut brown. It has one and three-quarters well-rounded nuclear whorls, which are marked by slightly retractively slanting rows of exceedingly minute pits. These pits also appear to be arranged in spiral series.

The post-nuclear whorls are almost flat and appressed at the summit. They are marked by fine incremental lines and exceedingly fine, closely spaced spiral striae. The suture is only slightly constricted. The periphery of the body whorl is obsoletely angulated, while the base is moderately long and moderately well rounded.

The aperture is moderately large and oval, with an obtuse posterior angle. The outer lip is thin. The curved inner lip joins the basal lip in a curve. The inner lip is appressed to the base for a little more than half its length; only the extreme anterior portion remains free. The parietal wall is covered by a thick callus, which makes the peritreme complete.

The summit of the body whorl falls slightly below the peripheral angle at the aperture. The operculum is typical.

== Distribution ==
This marine species occurs in the Pacific Ocean off Lower California, USA and Mexico.
