= Barleeia tomensis =

- Shell of Barleeia tomensis (holotype at MNHN, Paris)

Scientific classification
- Kingdom: Animalia
- Phylum: Mollusca
- Class: Gastropoda
- Subclass: Caenogastropoda
- Order: Littorinimorpha
- Family: Barleeiidae
- Genus: Barleeia
- Species: B. tomensis

Binomial name
- Barleeia tomensis Gofas, 1995

Species of gastropod

Barleeia tomensis is a species of sea snail, a marine gastropod mollusc in the family Barleeiidae.

== Description ==
The length of the holotype attains 2.1 mm; its diameter 1.2 mm.

== Distribution ==
This marine species occurs in Gulf of Guinea off São Tomé and Príncipe
