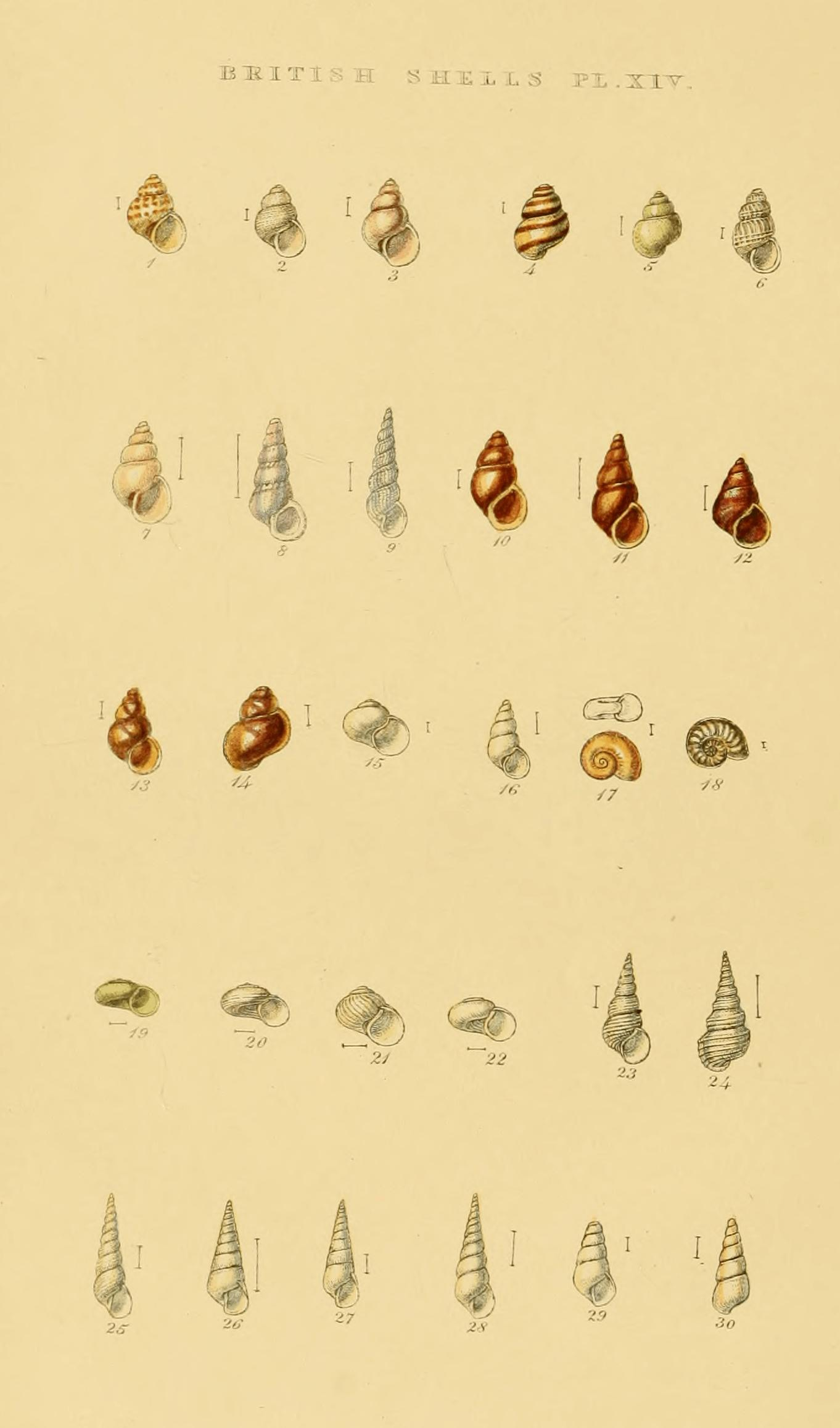

Scientific classification
- Kingdom: Animalia
- Phylum: Mollusca
- Class: Gastropoda
- Family: Rissoellidae
- Genus: Rissoella
- Species: R. diaphana

Binomial name
- Rissoella diaphana (Alder, 1848)

= Rissoella diaphana =

Species of gastropod

Rissoella diaphana is a species of gastropod belonging to the family Rissoellidae.

The species is found in Western Europe and Mediterranean.
