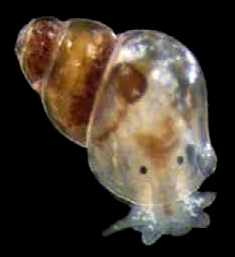
- Live Rissoella opalina

Scientific classification
- Kingdom: Animalia
- Phylum: Mollusca
- Class: Gastropoda
- Subterclass: Acteonimorpha
- Superfamily: Rissoelloidea
- Family: Rissoellidae
- Genus: Rissoella; Gray, 1847

Type species
- Rissoella diaphana (Alder, 1848)

Synonyms
- Heterorissoa Iredale, 1912; Jeffreysia Alder [in Forbes & Hanley], 1850; Jeffreysiella Thiele, 1912; Jeffreysina Thiele, 1925; Jeffreysiopsis Thiele, 1912; Rissoella (Jeffreysiella) Thiele, 1912; Rissoella (Phycodrosus) Rehder, 1943; Rissoella (Rissoella) Gray, 1847; Rissoella (Zelaxitas' Finlay, 1926; Zelaxitas Finlay, 1926

= Rissoella =

Genus of gastropods

Rissoella is a genus of minute sea snails, marine gastropods, in the family Rissoellidae.

== Species ==
According to the World Register of Marine Species (WoRMS), the following species with valid names are included within the genus Rissoella

- Rissoella abacoensis Caballer, Ortea & Redfern, 2014
- Rissoella alaskensis (Bartsch, 1907)
- Rissoella alexandrae (Ávila & Cordeiro, 2015)
- Rissoella aliciae Espinosa & Ortea, 2009
- Rissoella ameliae Ortea & Espinosa, 2004
- Rissoella angeli Manousis, 2021
- Rissoella anguliferens (de Folin, 1870)
- Rissoella atlantica (E. A. Smith, 1892)
- Rissoella atrimacula Ponder & Yoo, 1977
- Rissoella banana Ortea, 2022
- Rissoella belkisae Ortea & Espinosa, 2004
- Rissoella caribaea Rehder, 1943
- Rissoella colleenae Ponder & Yoo, 1977
- Rissoella confusa Ponder & Yoo, 1977
- Rissoella conica (de Folin & Périer, 1870)
- Rissoella contrerasi Rolán & Hernández, 2004
- Rissoella cystophora (Finlay, 1924)
- Rissoella dalii Ortea, Espinosa & Magana, 2004
- Rissoella dianae Ortea & Espinosa, 2004
- Rissoella diaphana (Alder, 1848)
- Rissoella dubia Golikov & Gulbin, 1978
- Rissoella edbayeri Caballer, Ortea & Redfern, 2014
- Rissoella elatior (Golikov, Gulbin & Sirenko, 1987)
- Rissoella elephantina Golikov & Gulbin, 1978
- Rissoella elongatospira Ponder, 1966
- Rissoella elsae Ortea & Espinosa, 2004
- Rissoella ermelindoi (Ávila & Cordeiro, 2015)
- Rissoella fallax Ponder & Yoo, 1977
- Rissoella flemingi Ponder, 1968
- Rissoella florae Ortea & Espinosa, 2004
- Rissoella fretterae Ponder & Yoo, 1977
- Rissoella galba Robertson, 1961
- Rissoella gandocaensis Ortea & Espinosa, 2001
- Rissoella globosa Ponder & Yoo, 1977
- Rissoella globularis (Forbes & Hanley, 1853)
- Rissoella golikovi (Gulbin, 1979)
- Rissoella heberti Vélain, 1877
- Rissoella hertleini Smith & Gordon, 1948
- Rissoella himba Rolán & Peñas, 2009
- Rissoella imperforata Ponder & Yoo, 1977
- Rissoella inflata Locard, 1892
- Rissoella irma (Bartsch, 1915)
- Rissoella japonica Chira & Hasegawa, 2019
- Rissoella kennethi Caballer, Ortea & Redfern, 2014
- Rissoella kiesslingi Ortea & Bacallado, 2021
- Rissoella luteonigra Rolán & Rubio, 2001
- Rissoella malayensis Thiele, 1925
- Rissoella micra (Finlay, 1924)
- Rissoella monterosoi Ortea, Bacallado & Moro, 2021
- Rissoella morrocoyensis Caballer, Ortea & Narciso, 2011
- Rissoella netoae (Ávila & Cordeiro, 2015)
- Rissoella notabilis (Thiele, 1912)
- Rissoella opalina (Jeffreys, 1848)
- Rissoella ornata Simone, 1995
- Rissoella peruviana Ponder & Worsfold, 1994
- Rissoella powelli Ponder, 1983
- Rissoella rissoaformis Powell, 1939)
- Rissoella salasae Ortea, 2019
- Rissoella sanctipauli Vélain, 1877
- Rissoella sanguinea Caballer, Ortea & Redfern, 2014
- Rissoella secunda (Iredale, 1912)
- Rissoella simoniana (Thiele, 1912)
- Rissoella tamiae Ortea & Moro, 2021
- Rissoella taniae Ortea & Espinosa, 2004
- Rissoella trigoi Rolán & Hernández, 2004
- Rissoella tumens (Carpenter, 1857)
- Rissoella urbanae Ortea & Espinosa, 2022
- Rissoella venezolanicola Caballer, Ortea & Narciso, 2011
- Rissoella violacea (Golikov & Kussakin in Golikov & Scarlato, 1971)
- Rissoella vitrea Ponder & Yoo, 1977
- Rissoella wilfredi (Gatliff & Gabriel, 1911)
- Rissoella zaidae Ortea & Espinosa, 2004
- Rissoella zebra Thiele, 1925

== Synonyms ==
- Rissoella bakeri A. M. Strong, 1938: synonym of Elachisina bakeri (A. M. Strong, 1938)
- Rissoella bifasciata (Carpenter, 1857): synonym of Barleeia bifasciata (Carpenter, 1856)
- Rissoella californica Bartsch, 1927: synonym of Elachisina grippi Dall, 1918
- Rissoella duperrei (Vélain, 1877): synonym of Eatoniella duperrei (Vélain, 1877)
- Rissoella excolpa Bartsch, 1920: synonym of Elachisina grippi Dall, 1918
- Rissoella glaber Gray, 1847: synonym of Rissoella glabra Gray, 1847: synonym of Rissoella diaphana (Alder, 1848) (wrong gender agreement)
- Rissoella glabra Gray, 1847: synonym of Rissoella diaphana (Alder, 1848)
- Rissoella johnstoni F. Baker, Hanna & A. M. Strong, 1930: synonym of Elachisina johnstoni (F. Baker, Hanna & A. M. Strong, 1930)
- Rissoella paupercula (C. B. Adams, 1852): synonym of Barleeia paupercula (C. B. Adams, 1852)
- Rissoella punicea (Laseron, 1950): synonym of Rissoella secunda (Iredale, 1912)
