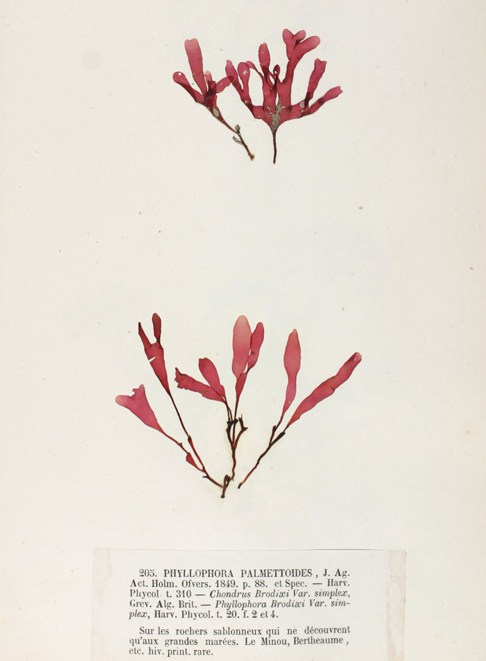
- A specimen of Phyllophora sicula

Scientific classification
- Domain: Eukaryota
- Clade: Archaeplastida
- Division: Rhodophyta
- Class: Florideophyceae
- Order: Gigartinales
- Family: Phyllophoraceae
- Genus: Phyllophora
- Species: P. sicula

Binomial name
- Phyllophora sicula (Kützing) Guiry & L.M.Irvine

= Phyllophora sicula =

Species of algea

Phyllophora sicula, the hand leaf bearer, is a small red marine alga.

== Description ==
This small red alga grows to a length of 20 mm (0.8 in), erect from a disc shaped holdfast. It has a short, erect, terete stipe which expands as a flattened blade branching once or twice. The blades have a cartilaginous texture with a medulla of large cells within a cortex of one or two layers of small cells.

== Reproduction ==
Gametangial plants are unknown. Tetrasporangial patches occur in the center of the blade.

== Habitat ==
It is found in rock pools of the lower littoral and in the sublittoral to depths of 12 m (39 ft).

== Distribution ==
It is generally recorded from the southwest of Great Britain, Ireland, Portugal, and elsewhere in the Mediterranean. The type locality is in Italy.
