= Barleeia picta =

- Shell of Barleeia picta (specimen at MNHN, Paris)

Scientific classification
- Kingdom: Animalia
- Phylum: Mollusca
- Class: Gastropoda
- Subclass: Caenogastropoda
- Order: Littorinimorpha
- Family: Barleeiidae
- Genus: Barleeia
- Species: B. picta

Binomial name
- Barleeia picta Gofas, 1995

Species of gastropod

Barleeia picta is a species of sea snail, a marine gastropod mollusc in the family Barleeiidae.

== Description ==
The length of the holotype attains 1.8 mm; its diameter 1 mm.

== Distribution ==
This marine species occurs in the Atlantic Ocean off Angola.
