= Barleeia subtenuis =

Scientific classification
- Kingdom: Animalia
- Phylum: Mollusca
- Class: Gastropoda
- Subclass: Caenogastropoda
- Order: Littorinimorpha
- Family: Barleeiidae
- Genus: Barleeia
- Species: B. subtenuis

Binomial name
- Barleeia subtenuis P. P. Carpenter, 1864

Species of gastropod

Barleeia subtenuis, common name the fragile barleysnail, is a species of sea snail, a marine gastropod mollusc in the family Barleeiidae.

Variety

- Barleeia subtenuis var. rimata P. P. Carpenter, 1864 (uncertain > taxon inquirendum)

== Distribution ==
This marine species occurs off the west coast of North America.
