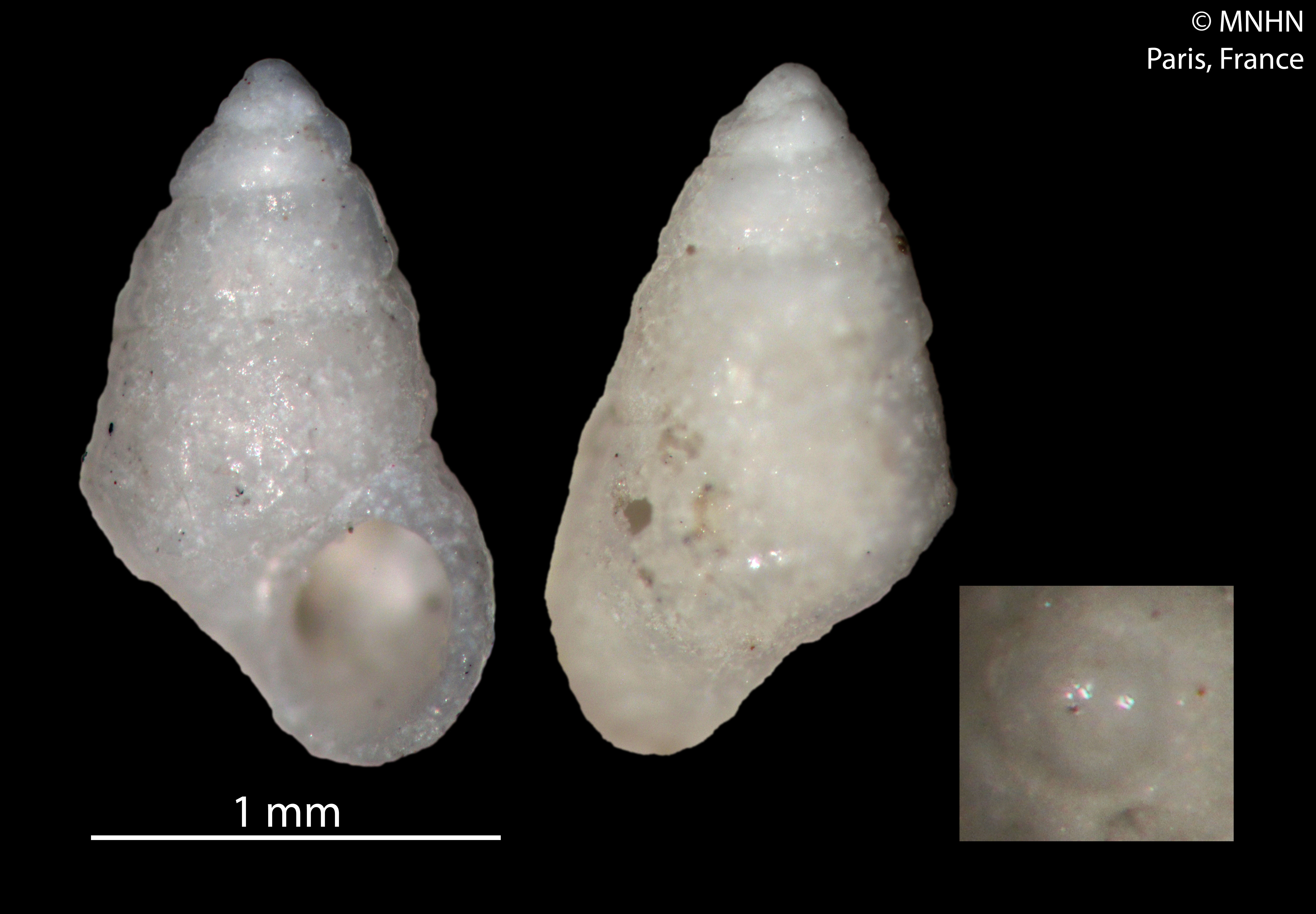
- Shell of Caelatura barcellosi (paratype at MNHN, Paris)

Scientific classification
- Kingdom: Animalia
- Phylum: Mollusca
- Class: Gastropoda
- Subclass: Caenogastropoda
- Order: Littorinimorpha
- Superfamily: Rissooidea
- Family: Barleeiidae
- Genus: Caelatura; Conrad, 1865

Synonyms
- Reneus Jousseaume, 1886

= Caelatura =

Genus of gastropods

Caelatura is a genus of minute sea snails, marine gastropod mollusks or micromollusks in the family Barleeiidae.

== Species ==
Species within the genus Caelatura include:

- Caelatura albertoi Santos & Absalão, 2007
- Caelatura aulakion Santos & Absalão, 2007
- Caelatura barcellosi Absalão & Rios, 1995
- Caelatura carinata Santos & Absalão, 2007
- Caelatura gerhardtae (De Jong & Coomans, 1988)
- Caelatura microstoma (R. B. Watson, 1886)
- Caelatura noxia Santos & Absalão, 2007
- Caelatura pernambucensis (R. B. Watson, 1886)
- Caelatura phrix Santos & Absalão, 2007
- Caelatura rustica (R. B. Watson, 1886)
- Caelatura speculabunda Absalão, 2002
- Caelatura spirocordata Absalão & Rios, 1995
- Caelatura tigrina Absalão, 2002
- Caelatura tupi Santos & Absalão, 2007
