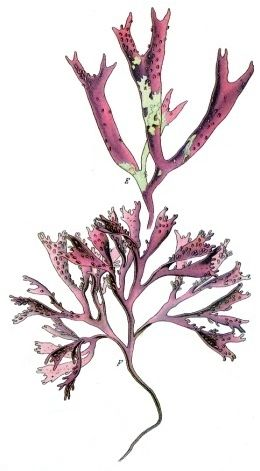
- Mastocarpus stellatus

Scientific classification
- Domain: Eukaryota
- Clade: Archaeplastida
- Division: Rhodophyta
- Class: Florideophyceae
- Order: Gigartinales
- Family: Phyllophoraceae
- Genus: Mastocarpus; Kützing, 1843

= Mastocarpus =

Genus of algae

Mastocarpus is a genus of red algae belonging to the family Phyllophoraceae.

The genus has almost cosmopolitan distribution.

== Species ==
Species:

- Mastocarpus agardhii
- Mastocarpus alaskensis
- Mastocarpus californianus
- Mastocarpus papillatus
- Mastocarpus stellatus
