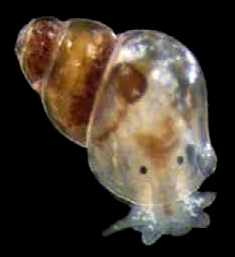
- A live Rissoella opalina

Scientific classification
- Kingdom: Animalia
- Phylum: Mollusca
- Class: Gastropoda
- Family: Rissoellidae
- Genus: Rissoella
- Species: R. opalina

Binomial name
- Rissoella opalina (Jeffreys, 1848)

Synonyms
- Rissoa opalina Jeffreys, 1848

= Rissoella opalina =

Species of gastropod

Rissoella opalina is a species of sea snail, a marine gastropod mollusc in the family Rissoellidae.

== Distribution ==
Ireland.
