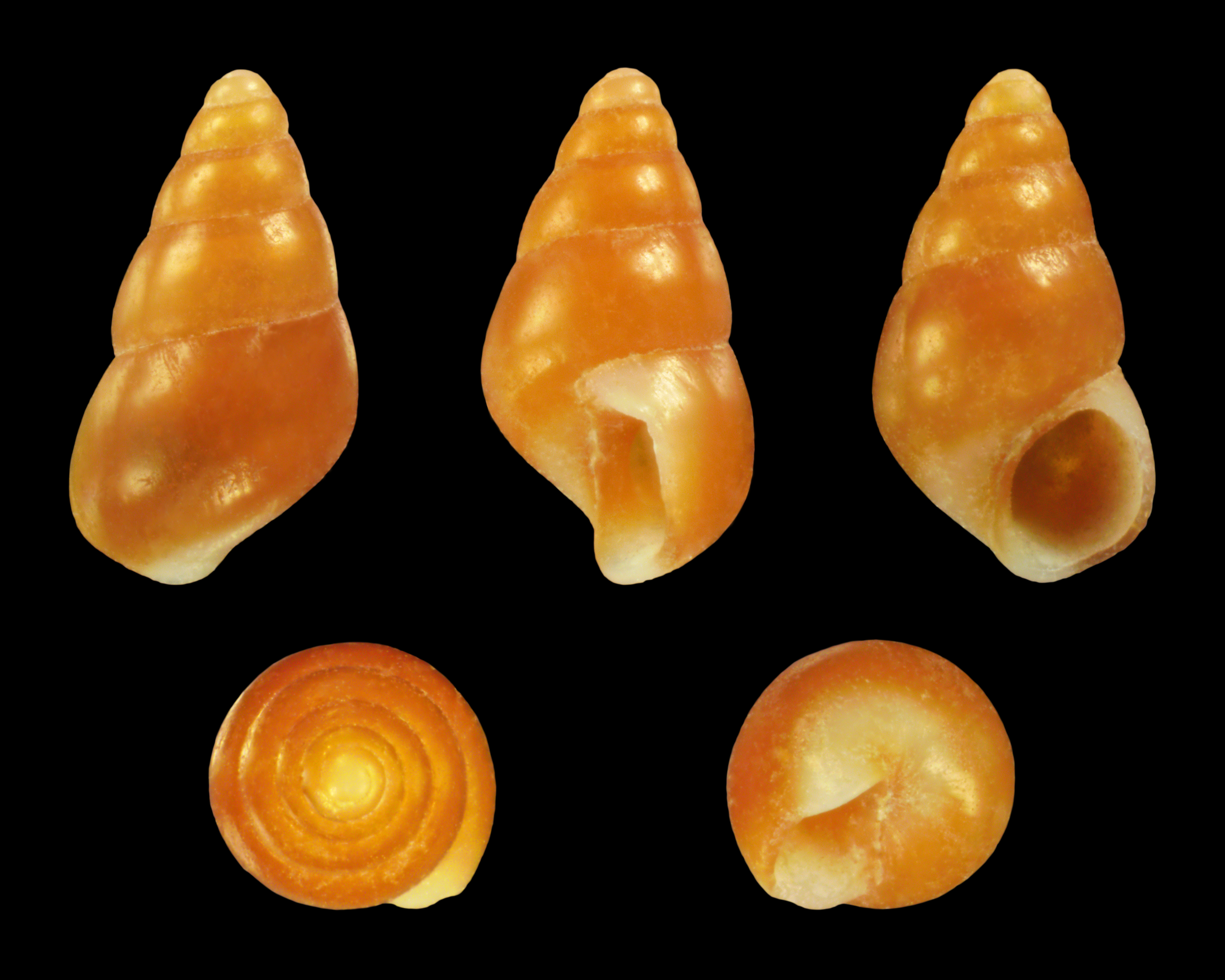
- Barleeia unifasciata

Scientific classification
- Kingdom: Animalia
- Phylum: Mollusca
- Class: Gastropoda
- Subclass: Caenogastropoda
- Order: Littorinimorpha
- Superfamily: Rissooidea
- Family: Barleeiidae
- Genus: Barleeia; W. Clark, 1853

Type species
- Turbo ruber J. Adams, 1797

Synonyms
- Barcleya [sic] misspelling - incorrect subsequent spelling; Barleia (incorrect subsequent spelling)

= Barleeia =

Genus of gastropods

Barleeia, or the barleysnails, is a genus of very small sea snails. They are marine gastropod micromollusks in the family Barleeiidae. These snails are usually only a couple of millimeters in length.

== Species ==
Species within the genus Barleeia include:

- Barleeia aemilii (S. Gofas 1995) Cape Verde
- Barleeia albicolor Rolán & Gori, 2014
- Barleeia alderi Carpenter 1856 – West America
- Barleeia annamitica Ph. Dautzenberg. & H. Fischer 1907
- Barleeia bentleyi P. Bartsch 1920 – West America
- Barleeia bifasciata (Carpenter, 1856)
- Barleeia caffra G. B. Sowerby III 1897
- Barleeia cala (E. A. Smith 1890) St. Helena
- Barleeia calcarea E. A. Kay 1979 - Hawaii
- Barleeia californica Bartsch 1920) - California barleysnail - America
- Barleeia carpenteri P. Bartsch 1920 – West-America
- Barleeia cebuensis Poppe & Tagaro, 2026
- Barleeia chefiae (S. Gofas 1995) Cape Verde
- Barleeia chrysomela Melvill & Standen 1896
- Barleeia cinguloides (S. Gofas 1995) Namibia, Angola.
- Barleeia congenita E. A. Smith 1890
- Barleeia coronadoensis Bartsch, 1920
- Barleeia creutzbergi (K.M. de Jong & H.E. Coomans 1988) Mexico, Costa Rica, Cuba, Curaçao.
- Barleeia dunedini (Grabau & S. G. King, 1928)
- Barleeia ephamilla (E. A. Smith 1890) St. Helena (taxon inquirendum)
- Barleeia fuscaexigua Rolán & Gori, 2014
- Barleeia fuscopicta E.A. Smith 1890
- Barleeia gougeti (Michaud 1829) Mediterranean
- † Barleeia gursi Lozouet, 2015 †
- Barleeia haliotiphila P. P. Carpenter 1864
- Barleeia lindae Rolán & Swinnen, 2004
- Barleeia malgascia Cecalupo & Perugia, 2009
- † Barleeia meiauhana Ladd, 1966
- Barleeia meridionalis (W. F. Ponder. & Worsfold, 1994) Peru
- Barleeia mexicana (Cruz-Abrego 1998) Mexico, Cuba
- Barleeia microthyra (E.C. von Martens 1880) Indo-Pacific
- Barleeia multicolor Rolán & Gori, 2014
- Barleeia oldroydi P. Bartsch 1920
- Barleeia orcutti (P. Bartsch 1920) West America
- Barleeia paupercula (C. B. Adams, 1852)
- Barleeia pervulgata (S. Gofas 1995) Namibia, Angola
- Barleeia picta (S. Gofas 1995) Namibia, Angola
- Barleeia polychroma (de Folin 1870) West America
- Barleeia procera Rolán & Gori, 2014
- † Barleeia propinqua Harmer, 1925
- Barleeia pseudangustata Poppe & Tagaro, 2026
- Barleeia qilu X. Han, L. Qi & L.-F. Kong, 2024
- Barleeia rubrooperculata (Z.J.A. de Castellanos & F. Fernandes 1972) southern Brazil, Uruguay.
- Barleeia sanjuanensis P. Bartsch 1920
- Barleeia seminulum (T. A. di Monterosato 1877) Europe
- Barleeia similis Amati & Renda, 2025
- Barleeia simplex (E. A. Smith, 1875)
- † Barleeia simplex Briart & Cornet, 1887 (accepted > unreplaced junior homonym, secondary homonym of Barleeia simplex (E. A. Smith, 1875))
- Barleeia smithi Bartsch 1915
- Barleeia subtenuis P. P. Carpenter 1864 - Fragile barleysnail - America
- Barleeia taeniolata (S. Gofas 1995) São Tomé and Príncipe
- Barleeia tincta R. J. L. Guppy 1895 - Caribbean barleysnail - eastern Florida, Trinidad.
- Barleeia tomensis (S. Gofas 1995) São Tomé and Príncipe
- Barleeia translucens Rolán & Gori, 2014
- Barleeia trifasciata (T. Habe 1960) Japan
- Barleeia tropica J. Thiele 1925
- Barleeia unifasciata G. Montagu 1803 - Shetland into Mediterranean; Canary Islands
- Barleeia verdensis (S. Gofas 1995) Cape Verde
- Barleeia viridis Amati & Renda, 2025

Species brought into synonymy

- Barleeia acuta P. P. Carpenter 1864 - acute barleysnail - America: synonym of Pseudodiala acuta (Carpenter, 1864)
- Barleeia angustata H.A. Pilsbry 1901 – Indo-Pacific: synonym of Ansola angustata (Pilsbry, 1901)
- Barleeia compacta (J. G. Jeffreys 1884) Europe: synonym of Barleeia gougeti (Michaud, 1830) (junior synonym)
- Barleeia rubra (A. A. Adam, 1795) West Africa: synonym of Barleeia unifasciata (Montagu, 1803)
- Barleeia zeteki (A. M. Strong & L. G. Hertlein 1939) West America: synonym of Barleeia paupercula (C. B. Adams, 1852)
