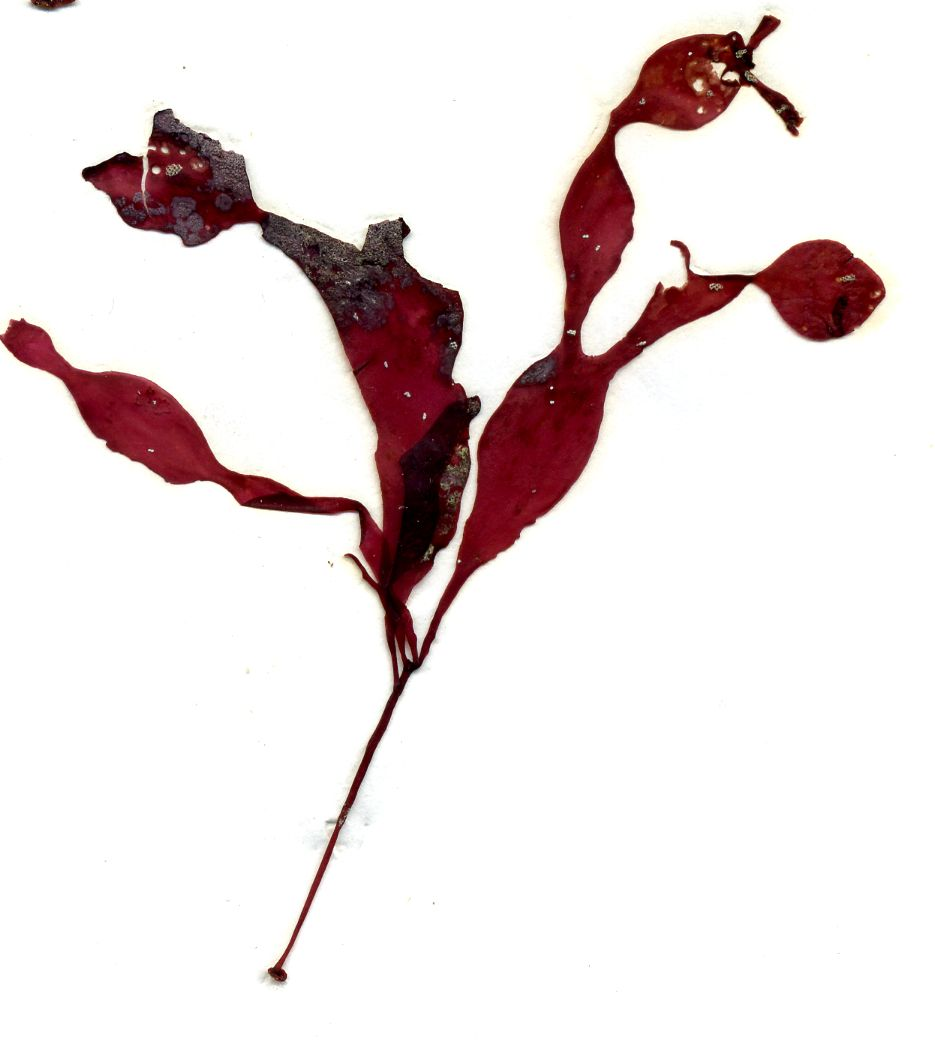
- Coccotylus truncatus

Scientific classification
- Domain: Eukaryota
- Clade: Archaeplastida
- Division: Rhodophyta
- Class: Florideophyceae
- Order: Gigartinales
- Family: Phyllophoraceae
- Genus: Coccotylus; Kützing, 1843

= Coccotylus =

Genus of algae

Coccotylus is a genus of red algae belonging to the family Phyllophoraceae.

The species of this genus are found in Europe and Northern America.

Species:

- Coccotylus hartzii (Rosenvinge) L.Le Gall & G.W.Saunders
- Coccotylus truncatus (Pallas) M.J.Wynne & J.N.Heine
