= Phyllophora pseudoceranoides =

Scientific classification
- Clade: Archaeplastida
- Division: Rhodophyta
- Class: Florideophyceae
- Order: Gigartinales
- Family: Phyllophoraceae
- Genus: Phyllophora
- Species: P. pseudoceranoides

Binomial name
- Phyllophora pseudoceranoides (S.G. Gmelin) Newroth & A.R.A. Taylor ex P.S .Dixon & L.M. Irvine

Species of alga

Phyllophora pseudoceranoides, the stalked leaf bearer, is a small marine red alga.

== Description ==
This red alga grows to a length of 10 cm (3.9 in). The frond is generally flattened and fan shaped, growing from a discoid holdfast forming a terete stipe with flattened branches dividing dichotomously as a blade with rounded apices. The medulla, the inner parts of the frond, is composed of large thick walled cells, closely packed become smaller towards the cortex.

== Reproduction ==
The plants are usually dioecious, male and female parts on separate plants. The spermatangia pits in the cortex, the cystocarps are pedicellate, urn-shaped growing to 3 mm long. The tetrasporangia occur form patches in rows on the sides of the blade.

== Habitat ==
In rock pools and in the intertidal zone to a depth of 30 m.

== Distribution ==
Commonly to be found around the Great Britain, Ireland, Isle of Man, Channel Islands, Iceland, Norway to Portugal and the Mediterranean.
