= Cythnia =

Scientific classification
- Kingdom: Animalia
- Phylum: Mollusca
- Class: Gastropoda
- Family: Rissoellidae
- Genus: Cythnia; Carpenter, 1864

Genus of gastropods

Cythnia is a genus of sea snails, marine gastropod molluscs in the family Rissoellidae.

== Species ==
There are only two known species to exist within this genus, these include the following:

- Cythnia albida (Carpenter, 1864)
- Cythnia asteriaphila (Carpenter, 1864)
