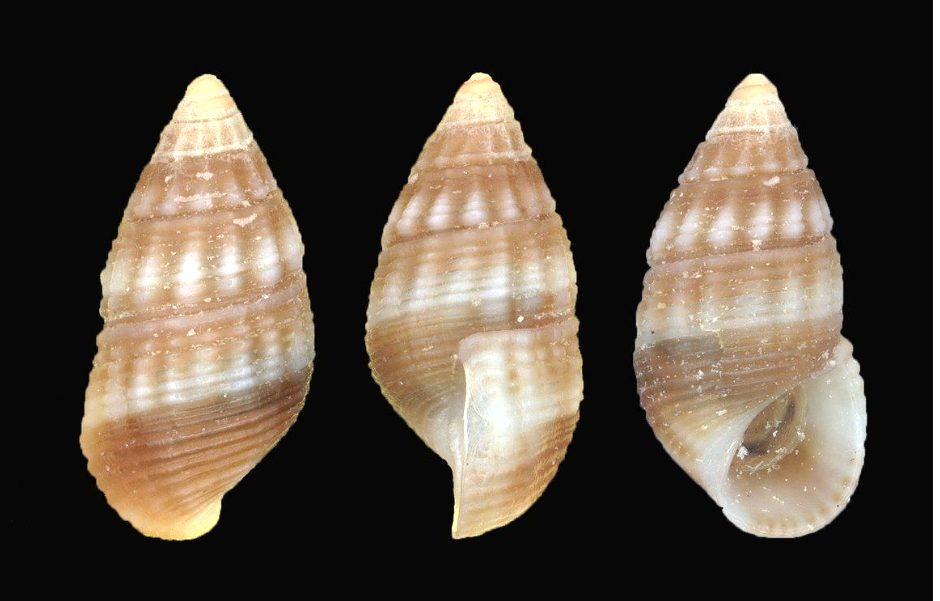
- Shell of Lirobarleeia lirata

Scientific classification
- Kingdom: Animalia
- Phylum: Mollusca
- Class: Gastropoda
- Subclass: Caenogastropoda
- Order: Littorinimorpha
- Superfamily: Rissooidea
- Family: Barleeiidae
- Genus: Lirobarleeia; Ponder, 1983

Type species
- Alvania nigrescens Bartsch & Rehder, 1939

= Lirobarleeia =

Genus of molluscs

Lirobarleeia is a genus of minute sea snails, marine gastropod mollusks or micromollusks in the family Barleeiidae.

== Species ==
Species within the genus Lirobarleeia include:

- Lirobarleeia albolirata (Carpenter, 1864)
- Lirobarleeia brami Faber & Moolenbeek, 2004
- Lirobarleeia chiriquiensis (Olsson & McGinty, 1958)
- Lirobarleeia clarionensis (Bartsch, 1911)
- Lirobarleeia deboeri (De Jong & Coomans, 1988)
- Lirobarleeia elata Gofas, 1995
- Lirobarleeia electrina (Carpenter, 1864)
- Lirobarleeia galapagensis (Bartsch, 1911)
- Lirobarleeia gradata (d'Orbigny, 1842)
- Lirobarleeia granti (Strong, 1938)
- Lirobarleeia herrerae (Baker, Hanna & Strong, 1930)
- Lirobarleeia hoodensis (Bartsch, 1911)
- Lirobarleeia ingrami (Hertlein & Strong, 1951)
- Lirobarleeia kelseyi (Dall & Bartsch, 1902)
- Lirobarleeia lara (Bartsch, 1911)
- Lirobarleeia lirata (Carpenter, 1857)
- Lirobarleeia nemo (Bartsch, 1911)
- Lirobarleeia perlata (Mörch, 1860)
- Lirobarleeia pupoides Gofas, 1995
- Lirobarleeia sublaevis Gofas, 1995

Taxon inquirendum

- Lirobarleeia veleronis (Hertlein & Strong, 1939)

Species brought into synonymy

- Lirobarleeia nigrescens (Bartsch & Rehder, 1939): synonym of Lirobarleeia galapagensis (Bartsch, 1911)
