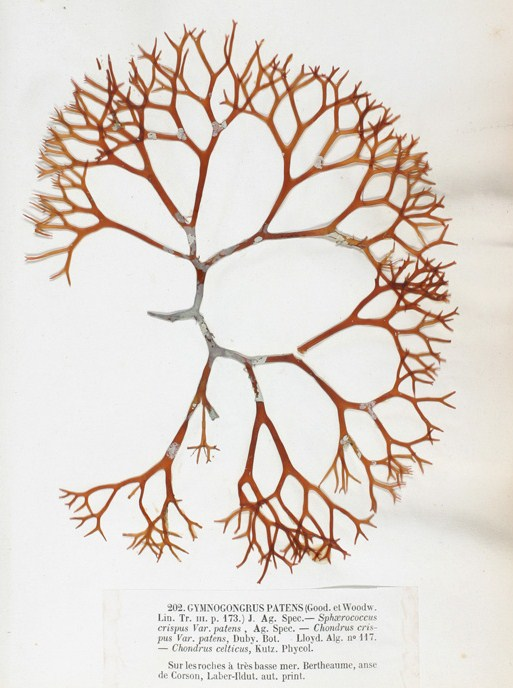
- Gymnogongrus patens

Scientific classification
- Clade: Archaeplastida
- Division: Rhodophyta
- Class: Florideophyceae
- Order: Gigartinales
- Family: Phyllophoraceae
- Genus: Gymnogongrus; Martius, 1833

= Gymnogongrus =

Genus of algae

Gymnogongrus is a genus of red algae belonging to the family Phyllophoraceae.

The genus has cosmopolitan distribution.

Species:

- Gymnogongrus chiton (Howe) Silva & De Cew
- Gymnogongrus crenulatus (Turner) J.Agardh, 1851
- Gymnogongrus crustiforme
- Gymnogongrus devoniensis
- Gymnogongrus disciplinaris
- Gymnogongrus durvillei (Bory) M.S.Calderon & S.M.Boo, 2017
- Gymnogongrus foliosus Harvey
- Gymnogongrus griffithsiae (Turner) Mart.
- Gymnogongrus johnstoni
- Gymnogongrus leptophyllus J.Agardh
- Gymnogongrus linearis (C.Agardh) J.Agardh
- Gymnogongrus martinensis
- Gymnogongrus norvegicus (Gunnerus) J.Agardh
- Gymnogongrus patens (Goodenough & Woodward) J.Agardh
- Gymnogongrus platyphyllus
- Gymnogongrus tenuis (J.Agardh) J.Agardh
- Gymnogongrus vermicularis
