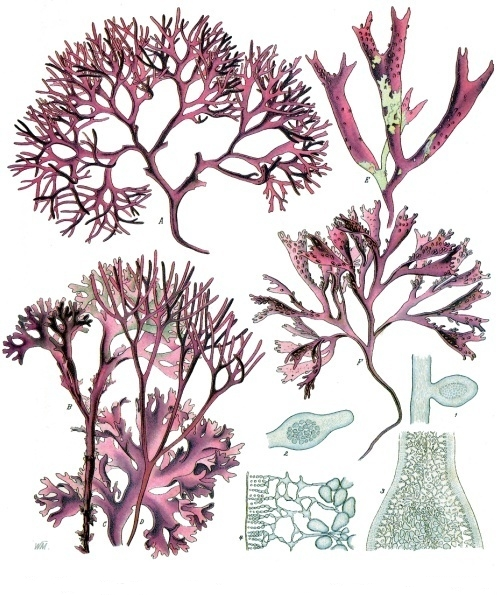
- A-D Chondrus crispus; E-F Mastocarpus stellatus

Scientific classification
- Domain: Eukaryota
- Clade: Archaeplastida
- Division: Rhodophyta
- Class: Florideophyceae
- Order: Gigartinales
- Family: Phyllophoraceae
- Genus: Mastocarpus
- Species: M. stellatus

Binomial name
- Mastocarpus stellatus (Stackhouse) Guiry

Synonyms
- Gigartina stellata

= Mastocarpus stellatus =

Carageen

Species of edible alga

Mastocarpus stellatus, commonly known as carrageenan moss or false Irish moss, is a species in the Rhodophyceae division, a red algae seaweed division, and the Phyllophoracea family. M. stellatus is closely related to Irish Moss (Chondrus crispus). It grows in the intertidal zone. It is most collected in North Atlantic regions such as Ireland and Scotland, together with Irish moss, dried, and sold for cooking and as the basis for a drink reputed to ward off colds and flu. Marine biologists have completed studies on the medicinal reputation of M. stellatus to discover the full potential of its pharmaceutical benefits. Additionally, marine biologists have conducted research on its potential to serve as an alternative to plastic. The application of M. stellatus in these different industries is correlated with the seaweed's adaptations which developed in response to the environmental stressors present around its location on the rocky intertidal.

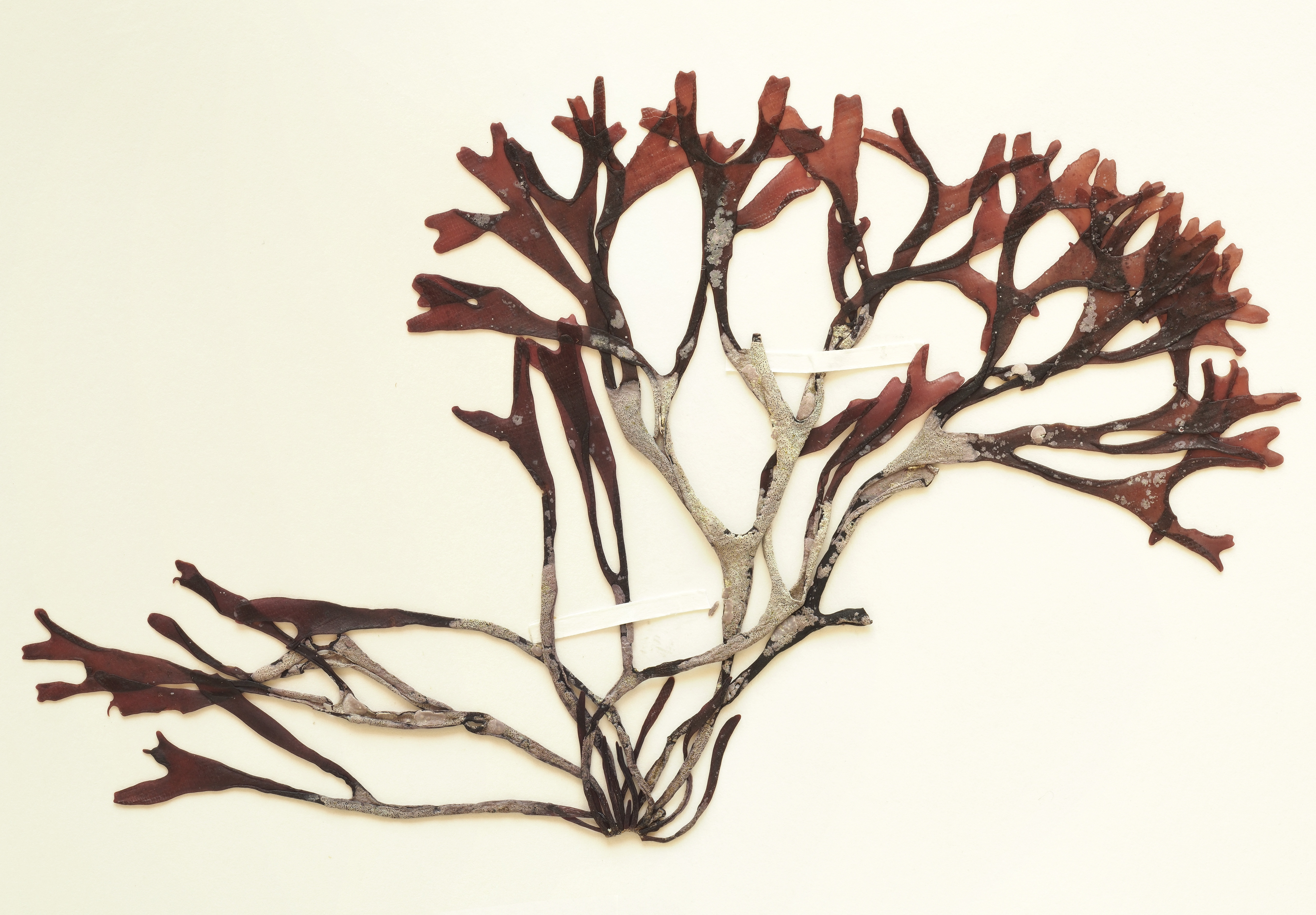
Mastocarpus stellatus removed from the rocky intertidal

== Description ==
It grows from a discoid holdfast stipe, and the fronds are channeled unlike those of Chondrus crispus, which are flat. It grows to a height of 10–20 cm (3.9–7.9 in) and branches dichotomously. The frond is cartilaginous and reddish-brown in colour, with a greenish or purplish tinge. The mature algae show reproductive structures which develop on erect filaments up to 1 mm (0.039 in) in diameter, these make it readily distinguishable from Chondrus crispus. In colour it is reddish brown, purple or bleached.

== Ecology ==
=== Habitat and distribution ===
M. stellatus occurs commonly on rocks in the mid and lower-intertidal. It is generally found on all coasts of Ireland and Britain, except perhaps for parts of the east of England: Lincoln, Norfolk and Suffolk. Other recorded locations include: Iceland, Faeroes, North Russia to Rio de Oro, Canada (Newfoundland) to U.S. (North Carolina). Mastocarpus stellatus is able to coexist with C. crispus on the northern New England coast despite being a competitive inferior to C. crispus. A greater tolerance for freezing allows it to exist above C. crispus in northern environments where freezing stresses are significant. M. stellatus is rarely found south of Cape Cod on the United States Atlantic coast because it is out competed by C. crispus when the freezing tolerances are lower.

=== Evolutionary adaptations ===
M. stellatus is morphologically similar to Chondrus crispus. Both species endure high levels of environmental stress from freezing temperatures, desiccation, high light, and hyper or hypo-osmotic shock. The degree of stress placed on the algae by these factors varies depending on the time of year and latitude. These stressors result in the production of reactive oxygen; large amounts of reactive oxygen around the algae can damage the organisms’ DNA, proteins, and lipids.

To defend against excessive production of reactive oxygen, these organisms use antioxidants to reduce oxygen levels. Compared to C. crispus, M. stellatus’ location on the rocky intertidal experiences greater fluctuations in environmental stressors. M. stellatus was found to have higher levels of oxygen metabolism and a faster decomposition rate than C. crispus. Additionally, M. stellatus makes use of scavenging enzymes including: catalase, superoxide dismutase, glutathione reductase, and ascorbate peroxidase (to scavenge hydrogen peroxide). After conducting his research on M. stellatus and C. crispus in 1999, Jonas Collén argued that the difference between the species may be an evolutionary adaptation by adopting different strategies to cope with environmental stressors at differing intertidal zones and locations. M. stellatus showed responses to changes to tidal height with changes in oxygen metabolism, suggesting that the increase in this enzyme activity (which produces a higher content of soluble protein to break down reactive oxygen compounds) requires energy allocation to these enzymes in order to adapt stress tolerance.

== Reproduction and life history ==
In 1979, Michael Guiry and John A. West conducted a study and determined that M. stellatus exhibits two distinct biological life cycles and reproduction processes; the first type being heteromorphic and the second being direct. M. stellatus exhibiting the heteromorphic-type life history are dioecious plants (in a broad sense) that reproduce sexually by alternating diploid crustose tetrasporophytes with foliose gametophytes. M. stellatus that have direct-type life histories reproduce asexually because fertilization never occurred. This results in the production of carpospores by the female gametophytes, resulting in the growth of foliose plants that lack tetrasporangia. Tetrasporangia are pivotal in sexual reproduction because, through meiosis, they create four unique tetraspores as male or female gametes. Since M. stellatus that produce asexually do not develop tetrasporangia, they are "genetically isolated" from sexually producing M. stellatus.

== Modern uses ==
The earliest record of collecting Irish seaweed is evidenced by 12th century poems by monks, according to Michael Guiry. In a 2001 market analysis of Irish seaweed aquaculture, the estimated combined annual national seaweed harvest of M. stellatus and C. crispus was less than 100 tonnes. M. stellatus is harvested during the gametophyte life phase because later phases, with more sulphated carrageenan, are harder to remove from its rock. The food and pharmaceutical industries are interested in the seaweed for their antioxidant, anticoagulant, and thickening or gelling properties. Antioxidant and anticoagulant properties are determined by sulfation, molecular weight, location of sulfate groups, sugar composition, and glycosidic branching. In addition to its health properties and applications, the gelling properties of M. stellatus can create a biodegradable film that may be a sustainable and edible alternative to plastics for food preservation and functional food development.

=== Alternative to plastic ===
Carrageen is the active polysaccharide compound that is responsible for the mechanisms that give the plant its antioxidant, anticoagulant, and gelling properties. The process of extracting the carrageenan from the M. stellatus usually consists of boiling the plant for several hours and using ethanolic precipitation to isolate the compound. Researchers found that the concentration of carrageen substance and efficiency of properties is dependent on the extraction conditions including boiling temperatures, drying methods, and dilution techniques. These compounds were used to create films to determine how chemical structures and biological reactions can be manipulated to produce beneficial levels of elasticity, durability, solubility, water resistance, and thickness required for an effective alternative to food packaging. Their findings suggest that higher concentrations of sulfate and proteins in the carrageenan reinforces the molecular structure, increases thickness, increases elasticity, and prevents water filtration, making the gel stronger. However, the strength between these bonds causes a concentration of force at their intersection which makes it easier to break. More studies must be conducted to test for more factors of M. stellatus and degrees of property efficacy.

=== Medicinal supplement ===
Carrageenan, or phycocolloids are sulfated linear polysaccharides composed of carrageenan and carrageenan precursors. In order for carrageenan compounds to be useful, the kappa and/or iota carrageenan need to be isolated from its mu-carrageenan or nu-carrageenan precursors. Lower molecular weight and higher amounts of sulfate results in higher antioxidant properties. Heavier molecular weight and higher amounts of sulfate result in anticoagulant properties. The relationships between antioxidant and anticoagulant mechanisms suggest that inflammation and coagulation are interconnected and interdependent processes in M. stellatus. M. stellatus has been used in home remedies to treat coughs, colds, and sore throats by mixing it with C. crispus and other herbs, spices, and sweeteners.
