= Barleeia bifasciata =

Scientific classification
- Kingdom: Animalia
- Phylum: Mollusca
- Class: Gastropoda
- Subclass: Caenogastropoda
- Order: Littorinimorpha
- Family: Barleeiidae
- Genus: Barleeia
- Species: B. bifasciata

Binomial name
- Barleeia bifasciata (P. P. Carpenter, 1857)

Synonyms
- Jeffreysia bifasciata P. P. Carpenter, 1857; Rissoella bifasciata (P. P. Carpenter, 1857)

Species of gastropod

Barleeia bifasciata is a species of sea snail, a marine gastropod mollusc in the family Barleeiidae.

== Description ==
(Original description in Latin) The shell is somewhat elevated, diaphanous, very thin, and smooth. It has five somewhat swollen whorls, with an impressed suture. There is a subsutural spiral line. The first whorl is very minutely granulate.

The shell is pale brown and is ornamented with two dark spiral bands. The aperture is somewhat oval, with a continuous peritreme and a very small umbilicus. The operculum is reddish and is not very thin.

Variation: The shell may be more or less elongated, and its colour may also be pale or horny.

== Distribution ==
This marine species occurs in the Mazatlan Basin, Mexico; also off Japan.
