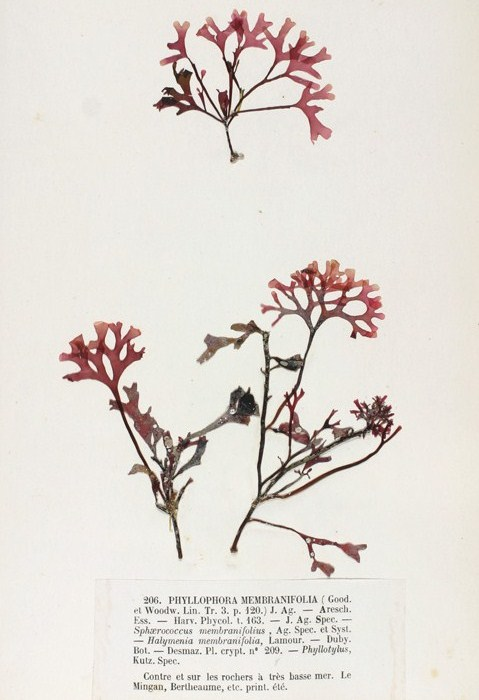
- Phyllophora pseudoceranoides

Scientific classification
- Domain: Eukaryota
- Clade: Archaeplastida
- Division: Rhodophyta
- Class: Florideophyceae
- Order: Gigartinales
- Family: Phyllophoraceae
- Genus: Phyllophora; Nägeli, 1847

Genera
- See text.

= Phyllophora =

Genus of algae

Phyllophora is a genus of red algae in the family Phyllophoraceae.

== Species ==
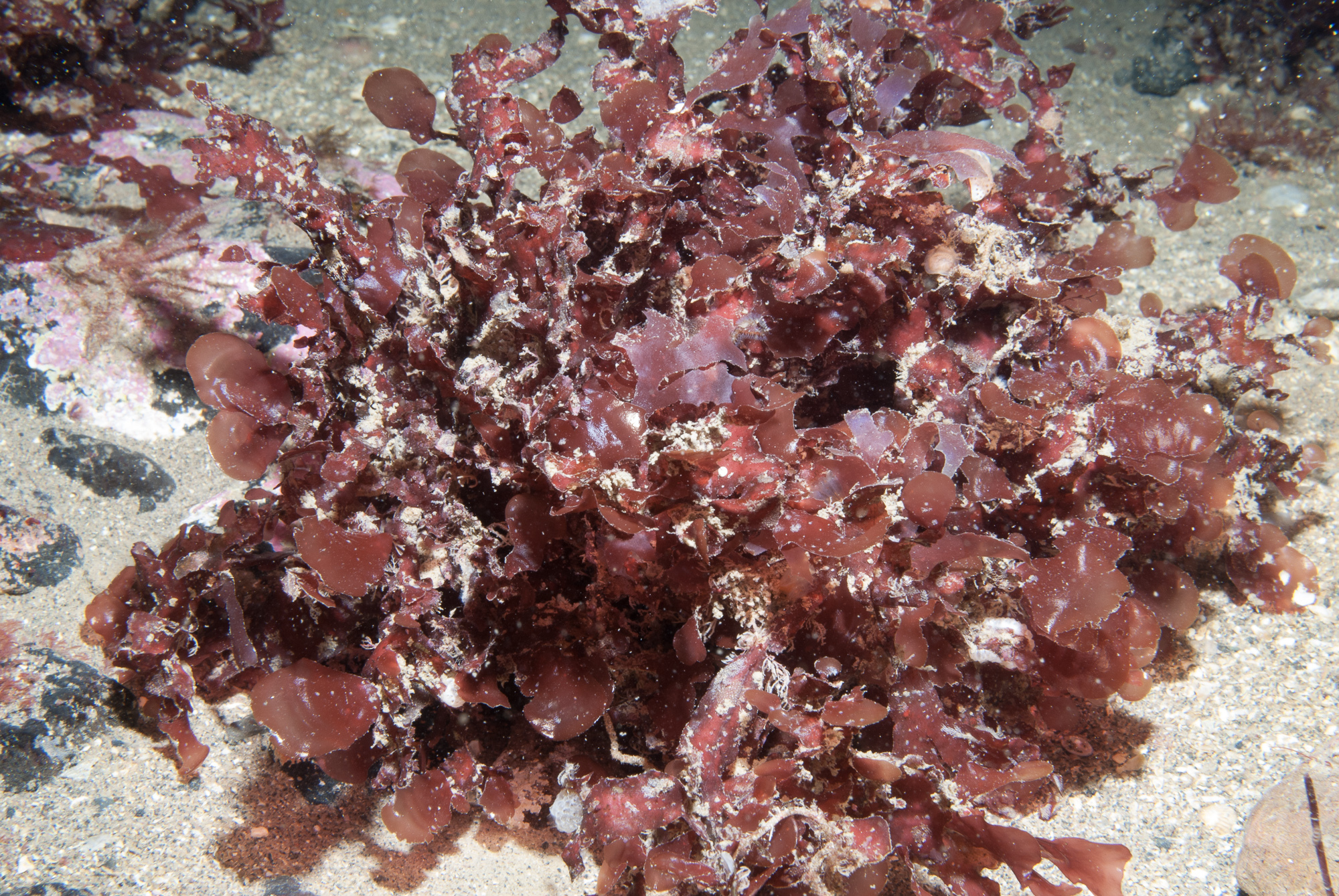
Phyllophora crispa

As of August 2017, the World Register of Marine Species included the following species in the genus Phyllophora:

- Phyllophora abyssalis Skottsberg, 1919
- Phyllophora ahnfeltioides Skottsberg, 1919
- Phyllophora antarctica A.Gepp & E.S.Gepp, 1905
- Phyllophora crispa (Hudson) P.S.Dixon, 1964
- Phyllophora fimbriata Ercegovic, 1949
- Phyllophora gelidioides P.L.Crouan & H.M.Crouan ex Karsakoff, 1896
- Phyllophora herediae (Clemente) J.Agardh, 1842
- Phyllophora japonica Yendo, 1920
- Phyllophora lactuca (C.Agardh) Greville
- Phyllophora lanceolata Filarszky
- Phyllophora lucida (Turner) Greville
- Phyllophora luxurians (C.Agardh) Montagne
- Phyllophora mammillosa (Goodenough & Woodward) Areschoug
- Phyllophora nicaeensis (J.V.Lamouroux) F.Schmitz
- Phyllophora pacifica (Hollenberg) Kylin
- Phyllophora peruviana Dawson, Acleto & Foldvik
- Phyllophora pristioides (Turner) Greville
- Phyllophora pseudoceranoides (S.G.Gmelin) Newroth & A.R.A.Taylor, 1971
- Phyllophora seminervis (C.Agardh) Greville
- Phyllophora sicula (Kützing) Guiry & L.M.Irvine, 1976
- Phyllophora submaritima E.Y.Dawson, 1949
- Phyllophora submaritimus E.Y.Dawson, 1961
- Phyllophora turquetii (Hariot) Skottsberg
- Phyllophora vittata (Turner) Greville
