= Cape Wadworth =

Headland of Antarctica

Coordinates: 73°19′S 169°47′E

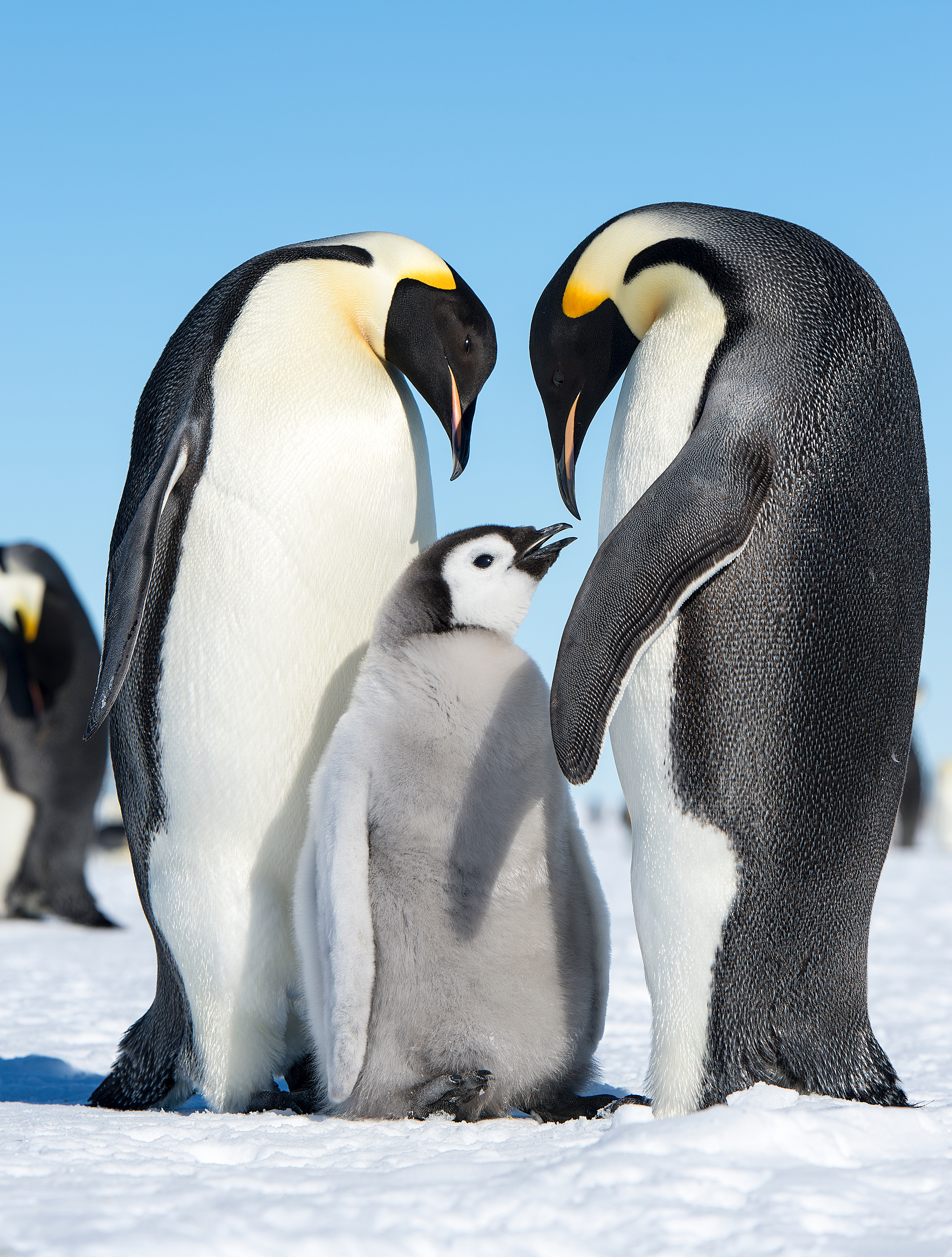
Emperor penguins breed in the IBA

Cape Wadworth is the northern extremity of Coulman Island, in the Ross Sea just off Victoria Land. Discovered 17 January 1841 by Sir James Clark Ross who named it to compliment his wife's uncle, Robert John Coulman of Wadworth Hall, Doncaster.

== Historic site ==
A message post was placed at the cape by Robert Falcon Scott on 15 January 1902. It consisted of a metal cylinder nailed to a red pole erected 8 m above sea level. The rocks behind the post were painted red and white to make it more conspicuous. The site has been designated a Historic Site or Monument (HSM 70), following a proposal by New Zealand, Norway and the United Kingdom to the Antarctic Treaty Consultative Meeting.

== Important Bird Area ==
A 415 ha site of sea ice about 5 km south-west of the cape has been designated an Important Bird Area (IBA) by BirdLife International because it supports a colony of about 25,000 emperor penguins (estimated from 2009 satellite imagery).
