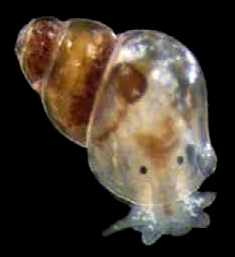
- Live Rissoella opalina

Scientific classification
- Kingdom: Animalia
- Phylum: Mollusca
- Class: Gastropoda
- Infraclass: Euthyneura
- Subterclass: Acteonimorpha
- Superfamily: Rissoelloidea; Gray, 1850
- Family: Rissoellidae; Gray, 1850

Synonyms
- Heterophrosynidae W. Clark, 1855 (n.a.); Jeffreysiidae H. Adams & A. Adams, 1852

= Rissoellidae =

Family of gastropods

Rissoellidae are a family of small sea snails, marine gastropod molluscs in the subclass Heterobranchia.

Rissoellidae is the only family within the superfamily Rissoelloidea in the taxonomy of the Gastropoda by Bouchet & Rocroi, 2005.

== Genera ==
Genera within the family Rissoellidae include:

- Cythnia Carpenter, 1864
- Rissoella Gray, 1847 - synonyms: Heterorissoa Iredale, 1912; Jeffreysia Alder [in Forbes & Hanley], 1850
