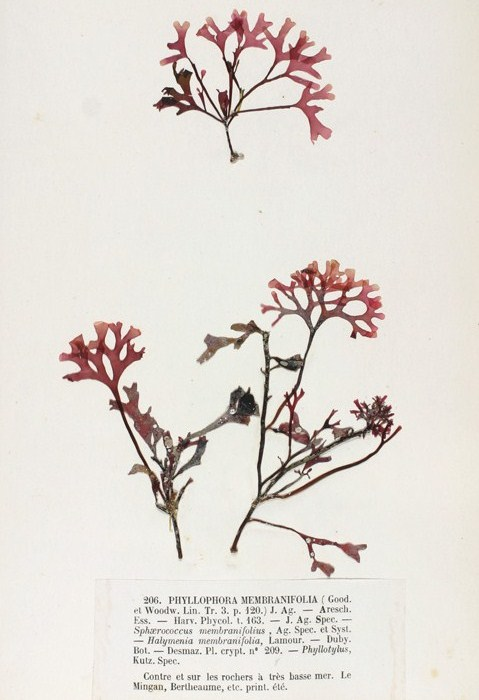
- Phyllophora pseudoceranoides

Scientific classification
- Domain: Eukaryota
- Clade: Archaeplastida
- Division: Rhodophyta
- Class: Florideophyceae
- Order: Gigartinales
- Family: Phyllophoraceae; Nägeli, 1847

Genera
- See text.

= Phyllophoraceae =

Family of algae

Phyllophoraceae is a family of red algae in the order Gigartinales.

== Genera ==
The World Register of Marine Species includes the following genera in the family Phyllophoraceae:

- Ahnfeltiopsis P.C.Silva & DeCew, 1992
- Archestenogramma C.W.Schneider, Chengsupanimit & G.W.Saunders, 2011
- Besa Setchell, 1912
- Ceratocolax Rosenvinge, 1898
- Coccotylus Kützing, 1843
- Erythrodermis Batters, 1900
- Fredericqia Maggs, Le Gall, Mineur, Provan & G.W.Saunders, 2013
- Gymnogongrus Martius, 1833
- Lukinia Perestenko, 1996
- Mastocarpus Kützing, 1843
- Ozophora J.Agardh, 1892
- Petroglossum Hollenberg, 1943
- Phyllophora Greville, 1830
- Schottera Guiry & Hollenberg, 1975
- Stenogramma Harvey, 1840
