= Barleeiidae =

- Shell of Ansola angustata

Scientific classification
- Kingdom: Animalia
- Phylum: Mollusca
- Class: Gastropoda
- Subclass: Caenogastropoda
- Order: Littorinimorpha
- Superfamily: Rissooidea
- Family: Barleeiidae; Gray, 1857

Genera
- See text

Synonyms
- Ansolidae Slavoshevskaya, 1975; Barleeidae [sic] (misspelling)a

Family of gastropods

Barleeiidae (often also spelled Barleeidae) is a family of small sea snails, micromollusks in the clade Littorinimorpha.

These snails are very abundant and live in sublittoral and intertidal waters on rocky substrates.

The shells are conical to high-spired. Their inner shell layer is chitinous. They are further characterized by a foot with sometimes a posterior mucous gland. Their olfactory organ, the osphradium is enlarged. In some species there are oesophageal pouches present. Their penis is sometimes provided with prostatic tissue. Their oviduct glands show a simple histology.

Few malacologists are currently working on micromollusks. Since they are so small (only a few millimeters in size), they are difficult to study and classify. Therefore, these small mollusks are less well known than the larger ones.

== Genera ==
Genera in the family Baleeiidae include:

- Ansola Slavoschevskaya, 1975
- Barleeia Clark, 1853 - Barleysnails
- Caelatura Conrad, 1853
- Fictonoba Ponder, 1967
- Ketosia Dos Santos & Absalao, 2006
- Lirobarleeia Ponder, 1983
- Protobarleeia Ponder, 1983
- Pseudodiala Ponder, 1967
- Tropidorissoia Tomlin & Shackleford, 1915
