= List of red seaweeds of South Africa =

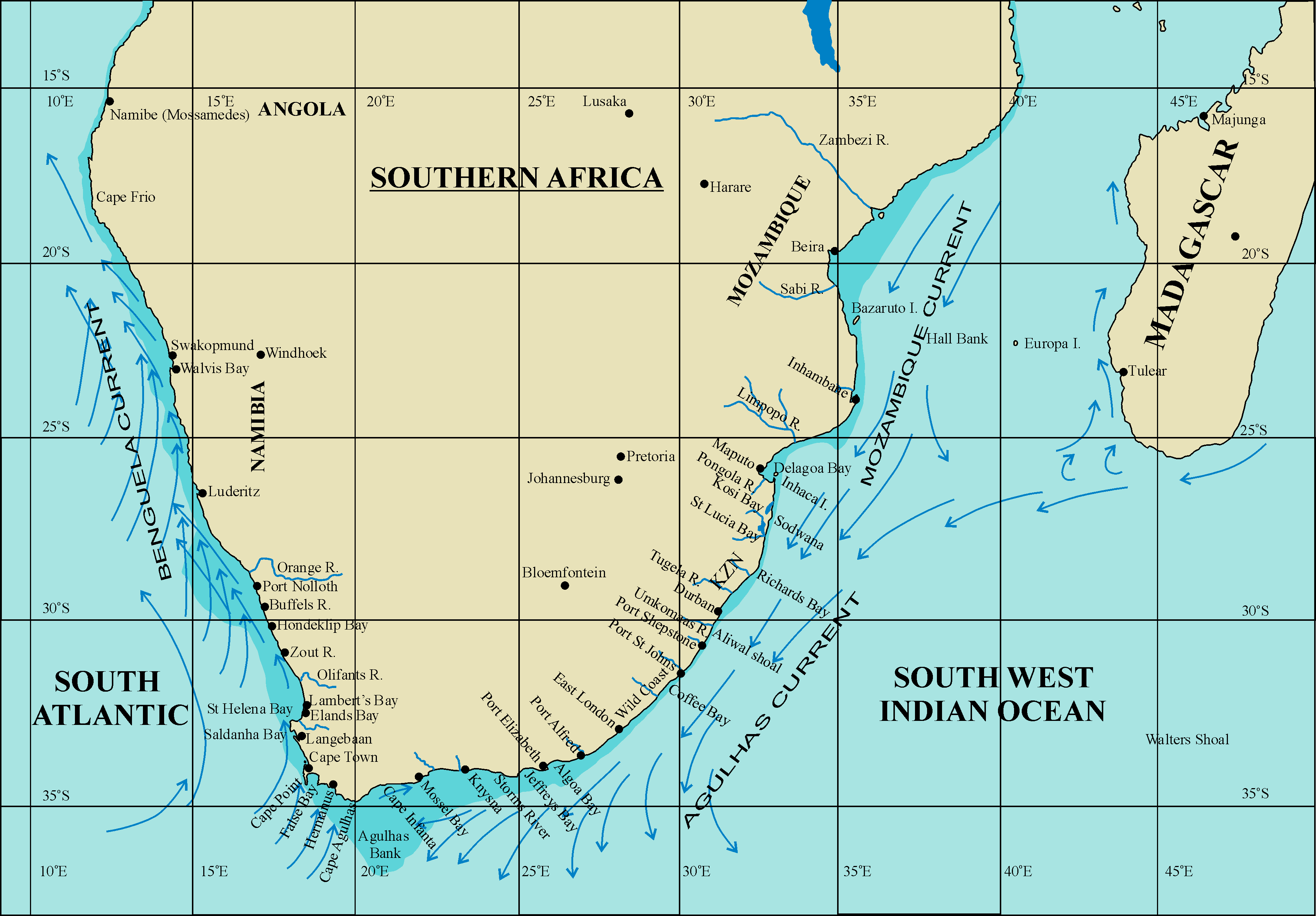
Map of the Southern African coastline showing some of the landmarks referred to in species range statements

Ecoregions of the South African exclusive economic zone

This is a list of red seaweeds (Domain: Eukaryota, Division: Rhodophyta) recorded from the oceans bordering South Africa. This list comprises locally used common names, scientific names with author citation and recorded ranges. Ranges specified may not be the entire known range for the species, but should include the known range within the waters surrounding the Republic of South Africa.

List ordering and taxonomy complies where possible with the current usage in Algaebase, and may differ from the cited source, as listed citations are primarily for range or existence of records for the region. Sub-taxa within any given taxon are arranged alphabetically as a general rule. Details of each species may be available through the relevant internal links. Synonyms may be listed where useful.

Red algae, or Rhodophyta (/roʊˈdɒfɪtə/, /ˌroʊdəˈfaɪtə/; from Ancient Greek ῥόδον (rhódon) 'rose' and φυτόν (phutón) 'plant'), make up one of the oldest and largest phyla of eukaryotic algae, containing over 7,000 recognized species within over 900 genera amidst ongoing taxonomic revisions. The majority of species (6,793) are in the class Florideophyceae, and mostly consist of multicellular marine algae, including many notable seaweeds. Red algae are abundant in marine habitats. Approximately 5% of red algae species occur in freshwater environments, with greater concentrations in warmer areas. This may be due to an evolutionary bottleneck in which the last common ancestor lost about 25% of its core genes and much of its evolutionary plasticity.

Red algae form a distinct group characterized by eukaryotic cells without flagella and centrioles, chloroplasts without external endoplasmic reticulum or unstacked (stroma) thylakoids, and use phycobiliproteins as accessory pigments, which give them their red color. Despite their name, red algae can vary in color from bright green, soft pink, resembling brown algae, to shades of red and purple, and may be almost black at greater depths and are only called red algae due to the phycobiliproteins and the reddish members. Unlike green algae, red algae store sugars as food reserves outside the chloroplasts as floridean starch, a type of starch that consists of highly branched amylopectin without amylose. Most red algae reproduce sexually. The life history of red algae is typically an alternation of generations that may have three generations rather than two. Coralline algae, which secrete calcium carbonate and play a major role in building coral reefs, belong there.

Red algae such as Palmaria palmata (dulse) and Porphyra species (laver/nori/gim) are a traditional part of European and Asian cuisines and are used to make products such as agar, carrageenans, and other food additives. (Full article...)

== Class: Bangiophyceae ==
=== Order: Bangiales ===
==== Family Bangiaceae ====
- Bangia atropurpurea (Mertens ex Roth) C.Agardh 1824, syn. Conferva atropurpurea Mertens ex Roth 1806, Oscillatoria atropurpurea (Roth) C.Agardh 1817, Bangia fuscopurpurea var. atropurpurea (Roth) Lyngbye 1819, Bangia atropurpurea (Mertens ex Roth) C.Agardh 1824, Bangiella atropurpurea (Roth) Gaillon 1833, Bangiadulcis atropurpurea (Roth) W.A.Nelson 2007, (Cosmopolitan)
- Porphyra capensis Kützing 1843, (Abundant on whole of west coast extending into Namibia and along south coast of Western and Eastern Cape. Endemic)
- Pyropia gardneri (G.M.Smith & Hollenberg) S.C.Lindstrom in Sutherland et al. 2011, syn. Porphyrella gardneri G.M.Smith & Hollenberg 1943, Porphyra gardneri (G.M.Smith & Hollenberg) M.W.Hawkes 1977, (Cape of Good Hope to Brandfontein)
- Pyropia saldanhae (Stegenga, J.J.Bolton & R.J.Anderson) J.E.Sutherland in Sutherland et al. 2011, syn. Porphyra saldanhae Stegenga, Bolton & R.J.Anderson 1997, (Hondeklip Bay and Olifantsbos, endemic)

=== Order: Porphyridiales ===
==== Family Phragmonemataceae ====
- Neevea cf. repens Batters 1900, (Hout Bay)

== Class: Compsopogonophyceae ==
=== Order: Erythropeltidales ===
==== Family Erythrotrichiaceae ====
- Erythrocladia cf. polystromatica P.J.L.Dangeard 1932, (St James, False Bay and Cape Hangklip)
- Erythrotrichia carnea (Dillwyn) J.Agardh 1883, syn. Erythrocladia carnea, Conferva carnea Dillwyn 1807, Bangia ciliaris subsp. pulchella (Harvey) De Toni 1897, (Probably fairly common, but South African distribution uncertain)
- Erythrotrichia welwitschii (Ruprecht) Batters 1902, syn. Cruoria welwitschii Ruprecht 1850, (Cape of Good Hope and False Bay extending eastwards at least as far as Port Elizabeth)
- Membranella africana Stegenga, Bolton & Anderson 1997, (Cape of Good Hope at least as far as Port Alfred)
- Porphyrostromium boryanum (Montagne) P.C.Silva in Silva, Basson & Moe 1996, Porphyra boryana Montagne 1846, Erythrotrichia boryana (Montagne) Berthold 1882, Phyllona boryana (Montagne) Kuntze 1891, Erythrotrichopeltis boryana (Montagne) Kornmann 1984, Porphyrostromium boryanum (Montagne) M.J.Wynne 1986, (Yzerfontein to Oatlands Point, False Bay)
- Sahlingia subintegra (Rosenvinge, 1909) Kornmann 1989, syn. Erythrocladia subintegra Rosenvinge 1909, Erythrocladia irregularis f. subintegra (Rosenvinge) Garbary, Hansen & Scagel 1981. Erythropeltis subintegra (Rosenvinge) Kornmann & Sahling 1985, Erythrotrichopeltis subintegra (Rosenvinge) Kornmann & Sahling 1985, (Worldwide – probably widely distributed in SA )

== Class: Florideophyceae ==
=== Order: Acrochaetiales ===
==== Family Acrochaetiaceae ====
- Acrochaetium brebneri (Batters) G.Hamel 1928, syn. Rhodochorton brebneri Batters 1897, Chantransia brebneri (Batters) Rosenvinge 1909, Audouinella brebneri (Batters) P.S.Dixon 1976, (False Bay side of the Cape Peninsula)
- Acrochaetium balliae (Stegenga), nom. illeg. syn. Audouinella balliae Stegenga 1985, (Port Nolloth to Hout Bay)
- Acrochaetium catenulatum M.A.Howe 1914, (Namibia to Eastern Cape)
- Acrochaetium endozoicum (Darbishire) Batters 1902, syn. Chantransia endozoica Darbishire 1899, Rhodochorton endozoicum (Darbishire) Drew 1928, Audouinella endozoica (Darbishire) P.S.Dixon 1976, (Cape Peninsula)
- Acrochaetium moniliforme (Rosenvinge) Børgesen 1915, Chantransia moniliformis Rosenvinge 1909, Rhodochorton moniliforme (Rosenvinge) Drew 1928, Kylinia moniliformis (Rosenvinge) Kylin 1944, Chromastrum moniliforme (Rosenvinge) Papenfuss 1945, Audouinella moniliformis (Rosenvinge) Garbary 1979, (False Bay eastward at least as far as Transkei)
- Acrochaetium plumosum (K.M.Drew) G.M.Smith 1944, syn. Colaconema plumosum (Drew) Woelkerling 1971, Rhodochorton Plumosum Drew 1928, (Hondeklip Bay to Betty's Bay)
- Acrochaetium reductum (Rosenvinge) G.Hamel 1927, syn. Chantransia reducta Rosenvinge 1909, (Between False Bay and Plettenberg Bay)
- Acrochaetium secundatum (Lyngbye) Nägeli 1858, syn. Callithamnion daviesii var. secundatum Lyngbye 1819, (Namibia to False Bay)
- Acrochaetium tenuissimum (F.S.Collins) Papenfuss 1945, syn. Chantransia virgatula f. tenuissima F.S.Collins in Collins, Holden & Setchell 1900, (Groot Bergriver estuary in Velddrif and Estuarine environment in Transkei)
- Audouinella occulta H.Stegenga 1985, (Hout Bay)
- Audouinella monorhiza (Stegenga) Garbary 1987, syn. Colaconema monorhiza Stegenga 1985, (Noordhoek and Olifantsbos, Cape Peninsula)
- Audouinella pectinata (Kylin) Papenfuss 1945, syn. Chantransia pectinata Kylin, 1906, (Doring Bay to Olifantsbos)
- Audouinella spongicola (Weber-van Bosse) Stegenga 1985, syn. Acrochaetium spongicola Weber-van Bosse 1921, (Hout Bay to Bird Island, Eastern Province)

=== Order Balliales ===
==== Family Balliaceae ====
- Ballia callitricha (C.Agardh) Kützing 1843, syn. Sphacelaria callitricha C.Agardh 1824, (West side of Cape Peninsula to Cape Agulhas)
- Ballia sertularioides (Suhr) Papenfuss 1940, syn. Callithamnion sertularioides Suhr 1840, (Lüderitz in Namibia to Hout Bay, Southern African endemic)

=== Order Bonnemaisoniales ===
==== Family Bonnemaisoniaceae ====
- Asparagopsis armata Harvey 1855syn. Falkenbergia rufolanosa (Harvey) F.Schmitz in Engler & Prantl 1897, (Platbank, Cape Peninsula eastwards)
- Asparagopsis taxiformis (Delile) Trevisan de Saint-Léon 1845, syn. Fucus taxiformis Delile 1813, Lictoria taxiformis (Delile) J.Agardh 1841, (Scottburgh, Common north of Cape Vidal)
- Bonnemaisonia hamifera Hariot 1891, (Known from one collection at Strandfontein, False Bay)
- Delisea flaccida (Suhr) Papenfuss 1940, syn. Sphaerococcus flaccidus Suhr 1834, (Olifantsbos on the Cape Peninsula eastwards)

=== Order Ceramiales ===
==== Family Callithamniaceae ====
- Aglaothamnion hookeri (Dillwyn) Maggs & Hommersand 1993, syn. Conferva hookeri Dillwyn 1809, Callithamnion hookeri (Dillwyn) S.F.Gray 1821, (Namibia to East London)
- Aglaothamnion tripinnatum (C.Agardh) Feldmann-Mazoyer 1941, syn. Callithamnion tripinnatum C.Agardh 1828, Phlebothamnion tripinnatum (C.Agardh) Kützing 1849, (Brandfontein, and south coast as far as East London)
- Callithamnion cordatum Børgesen 1909, (Cape Hangklip to Kowie River)
- Callithamnion exiguum Stegenga, Bolton & R.J.Anderson 1997, (Betty's Bay)
- Callithamnion stuposum Suhr 1840, syn. Phlebothamnion stuposum (Suhr) Kützing 1843, Spongoclonium stuposum (Suhr) De Toni 1903, (Swartklip to KwaZulu-Natal)
- Callithamnion sp. indet. (Cape Peninsula to East London)
- Heteroptilon pappeanum (Kützing) Hommersand in Hommersand, D.W. Freshwater, J. López-Bautista, & S. Fredericq 2006, syn. Euptilota pappeana Kützing 1849, (Hondeklipbaai to Cape Agulhas, endemic)
- Heteroptilon rigidulum (De Clerck, Bolton, R.J.Anderson & Coppejans) Hommersand & De Clerck in Hommersand, D.W. Freshwater, J. López-Bautista, & S. Fredericq 2006, syn. Aglaothamnion rigidulum De Clerck, Bolton, R.J.Anderson & Coppejans 2004, (as Aglaothamnium rigidulum, Port Edward to Palm Beach, endemic)

==== Family Ceramiaceae ====
- Antithamnion diminuatum var. polyglandulum Stegenga 1986, (Olifantsbos in the southern Cape Peninsula eastward to KwaZulu-Natal)
- Antithamnion pseudoarmatum Stegenga 1986, (Olifantsbos and Brandfontein, endemic)
- Antithamnion sp. indet. (Cape Hangklip)
- Antithamnionella spirographidis (Schiffner) E.M.Wollaston 1968, syn. Antithamnion spirographidis Schiffner 1916, Irtugovia spirographidis (Schiffner) Perestenko 1994, (Kraalbaai)
- Antithamnionella tasmanica Wollaston 1968, (Kalk Bay to Kowie River)
- Antithamnionella tormentosa Stegenga 1986, (Cape Peninsula from Three Anchor Bay to Muizenberg, endemic)
- Antithamnionella verticillata (Suhr) Lyle 1922, syn. Callithamnion vertillatum Suhr 1840, Antithamnion verticillatum (Suhr) De Toni 1903, (Swartklip in False Bay to Transkei)
- Balliella crouanioides (Itono) Itono & T.Tanaka 1973, syn. Antithamnion crouanioides Itono 1971, (Aliwal shoal northwards)
- Bornetia repens Stegenga 1985, (Swartklip in False Bay to Transkei, possibly KwaZulu-Natal)
- Callithamniella capensis Simons 1970, (Muizenberg to East London, endemic)
- Callithamnion stuposum Suhr 1840, syn. Phlebothamnion stuposum (Suhr) Kützing 1843, Spongoclonium stuposum (Suhr) De Toni 1903, (Rare on weat coast, common on south coast and KwaZulu-Natal at least as far north as Mabibi)
- Carpoblepharis flaccida (J.V.Lamouroux) Kützing 1849, syn. Ptilota flaccida (J.V.Lamouroux) C.Agardh 1822, Delesseria flaccida J.V.Lamouroux 1813, (Namibia to the Kei river, Southern African endemic)
- Carpoblepharis minima E.S.Barton 1893, (Möwe Bay in Namibia to Buffels Bay on the Cape Peninsula)
- Centroceras clavulatum (C.Agardh) Montagne 1846, syn. Ceramium clavulatum C.Agardh 1822, Spyridia clavulata (C.Agardh) J.Agardh 1842, (Whole southern African coast)
- Centroceras distichum Okamura 1934, (Cape Hangklip)
- Ceramium arenarium Simons 1966, (Swakopmund in Namibia to East London, Southern African endemic)
- Ceramium atrorubescens Kylin 1938, (Swakopmund to Port Nolloth, Southern African endemic)
- Ceramium aff. callipterum Mazoyer 1938, (West side of southern Cape Peninsula)
- Ceramium camouii E.Y.Dawson 1944, (Cape Point eastwards along south coast)
- Ceramium capense Kützing 1841, (Lüderitz to Kommetjie, endemic)
- Ceramium centroceratiforme Simons 1966, (Cape Hangklip to Kei River, endemic)
- Ceramium dawsonii A.B.Joly 1957, (False Bay eastward along entire Cape south coast)
- Ceramium glanduliferum Kylin 1938, (Sea Point on Cape Peninsula eastward into KwaZulu-Natal, Southern African endemic)
- Ceramium obsoletum C.Agardh 1828, (From Namibia south and eastwards along the whole Cape South coast, South African endemic)
- Ceramium papenfussianum Simons 1966, (Primarily a West Coast species, endemic)
- Ceramium poeppigianum Grunow 1868, syn. Reinboldiella poeppigiana (Grunow) Feldmann & Mazoyer 1937, (Stilbaai to KwaZulu-Natal as far as Mission Rocks)
- Ceramium planum Kützing 1849, (Swakopmund in Namibia to False Bay. Southern African endemic)
- Ceramium tenerrimum (G.Martens) Okamura 1921, syn. Hormoceras tenerrimum G.Martens 1866, (Whole of Cape west coast and east to Knysna)
- Ceramium sp. indet. (Port Nolloth, endemic?)
- Compsothamnionella sciadophila Stegenga 1990, (Found once at Muizenberg, endemic)
- Crouania attenuata (C.Agardh) J.Agardh 1842, syn. Mesogloia attenuata C.Agardh 1824, (Kalk Bay eastwaerd into tropical East Africa)
- Crouania francescoi Cormaci, G.Furnari & Scammacca 1978, (False Bay eastwards to northern KwaZulu-Natal)
- Gayliella flaccida (Harvey ex Kützing) T.O.Cho & L.J.McIvor in Cho et al. 2008, syn. Hormoceras flaccidum Harvey ex Kützing 1862, Ceramium flaccidum (Harvey ex Kützing) Ardissone 1871, (as Ceramium flaccidum, probably widespread alongmost of the South African east coast)
- Grateloupia belangeri (Bory de Saint-Vincent) De Clerck, Gavio, Fredericq, Cocquyt & Coppejans 2005, syn. Iridaea belangeri Bory de Saint-Vincent 1834, Phyllymenia belangeri (Bory de Saint-Vincent) Setchell & N.L.Gardner 1936, (Whole west coast extending into Namibia. Southernmost record from Platboombaai, endemic)
- Laurenciophila minima Stegenga 1986, (Clovelly in False Bay to Kowie river, endemic)
- Microcladia gloria-spei Stegenga 1986, (Port Nolloth to Southern Cape Peninsula),
- Platythamnion capense Stegenga 1986, (Only known from Platboombaai, endemic)
- Pterothamnion recurvatum (Wollaston) Athanasiadis & Kraft 1994, syn. Platythamnion recurvatum E.M.Wollaston 1972, (Paternoster to Olifantsbos, Port Alfred)
- Seagriefia fasciculifera Stegenga, Bolton & R.J.Anderson 1997, (Just east of Cape Hangklip, endemic)
- Syringocolax macroblepharis Reinsch 1875, (Cape Agulhas to Morgan Bay near Kei Mouth, endemic)

==== Family Callithamniaceae ====
- Callithamnion collabens (Rudolphi) L.McIvor & Maggs 2002, syn. Asperocaulon collabens Rudolphi 1831, Aristothamnion collabens (Rudolphi) Papenfuss 1968, (Namibia to Port Alfred, Southern African endemic)
- Euptilota fergusonii A.D.Cotton 1907, (Sodwana Bay northwards)
- Euptilota molle (Wollaston) O.De Clerck 2004, syn. Thamnocarpus mollis Wollaston 1992, Carpothamnion molle (Wollaston) P.C.Silva 1996, (Only reported from southern KwaZulu Natal at Protea Banks and northern Eastern Cape, endemic)

==== Family Dasyaceae ====
- Dasya echinata Stegenga, Bolton & R.J.Anderson 1997, (Brandfontein, Strandfontein in False Bay, and Waterloo Bay in Eastern Cape, endemic)
- Dasya scoparia Harvey in J. Agardh 1841, (Lambert's Bay to East London), (Lamberts Bay to Mabibi in northern KwaZulu-Natal)
- Dasya stanleyi (Weber-van Bosse) A.J.K.Millar 1996, syn. Dasyopsis stanleyi Weber-van Bosse 1913, Eupogodon stanleyi (Weber-van Bosse) P.C.Silva 1987, (Coral reef habitats in northern KwaZulu-Natal)
- Dipterocladia pinnatifolia (Suhr) Y.S.D.M.de Jong in De Jong, Prud'homme van Reine & Lokhorst 1997, (Probably restricted to Eastern Cape and extending into southern KwaZulu-Natal as far as Sottburgh, endemic)
- Heterosiphonia arenaria Kylin 1938, (Swartklip. Brandfontein, and Port Elizabeth to East London, endemic)
- Heterosiphonia crispa (Suhr) Falkenberg 1901, syn. Dasya crispa Suhr 1840, (Lamberts Bay to KwaZulu-Natal, endemic)
- Heterosiphonia dubia (Suhr) Falkenberg 1901, syn. Dasya dubia Suhr 1840, (Paternoster to KwaZulu-Natal, Southern African endemic)
- Heterosiphonia pellucida (Harvey) Falkenberg 1901, syn. Dasya pellucida Harvey 1849, (Lamberts Bay to Brandfontein, endemic)

==== Family Delesseriaceae ====
- Acrosorium acrospermum (J.Agardh) Kylin 1938, syn. Nitophyllum ascospermum J.Agardh 1852, (False Bay to Eastern Cape, endemic)
- Acrosorium maculatum (Sonder ex Kützing) Papenfuss 1940, syn. Aglaophyllum maculatum Sonder ex Kützing 1866, Nitophyllum uncinatum var. maculatum (Sonder ex Kützing) De Toni 1900, (Southern Cape Peninsula to KwaZulu-Natal)
- Acrosorium ciliolatum (Harvey) Kylin 1924, syn. Nitophyllum ciliolatum Harvey 1855, Aglaophyllum ciliolatum (Harvey) Kützing 1869, Nitophyllum venulosum Zanardini 1866, Acrosorium venulosum (Zanardini) Kylin 1924, (as A. venulosum, Kommetjie to KwaZulu-Natal) (as A. ciliatum, Kommetjie eastward extending into KwaZulu-Natal at least as far as Sodwana Bay)
- Apoglossum ruscifolium (Turner) J.Agardh 1898, syn. Fucus ruscifolius Turner 1802, Delesseria ruscifolia (Turner) J.V.Lamouroux 1813, (Oudekraal to Brandfontein)
- Augophyllum marginifructum (R.E.Norris & M.J.Wynne) S.-M.Lin, Fredericq & Hommersand 2004, syn. Myriogramme marginifructa R.E.Norris & M.J.Wynne 1987, (Leadsman shoal northwards)
- Bartoniella crenata (J.Agardh ex Mazza) Kylin 1924, syn. Phitymophora crenata J.Agardh ex Mazza 1908, (Muizenberg and Cape Hangklip at least as far as Mission Rocks, endemic)
- Botryocarpa prolifera Greville 1830, (Namibia to southern Cape Peninsula)
- Botryoglossum platycarpum (Turner) Kützing 1843, syn. Fucus platycarpus Turner 1809, Delesseria platycarpa (Turner) J.V.Lamouroux 1813, Phyllophora platycarpa (Turner) Greville ex Krauss 1846, Nitophyllum platycarpum (Turner) J.Agardh 1876, (Namibia to Cape of Good Hope. Southern African endemic)
- Caloglossa leprieurii (Montagne) G.Martens 1869, syn. Delesseria leprieurii Montagne 1840, Hypoglossum leprieurii (Montagne) Kützing 1849, Caloglossa leprieurii (Montagne) J.Agardh 1876, (Langebaan lagoon, Berg river estuary. Also known from estuarine areas and mangrove vegetations of the Eastern Cape and KwaZulu-Natal)
- Delesseria papenfussii M.J.Wynne 1984, (Port Nolloth to Brandfontein. Southern African endemic)
- Erythroglossum sp. indet. (Glencairn to Hluleka, endemic)
- Gonimophyllum africanum M.T.Martin & M.A.Pocock 1953, (Table Bay to Kei River)
- Haraldiophyllum bonnemaisonii (Kylin) A.D.Zinova 1981, syn. Myriogramme bonnemaisonii Kylin 1924, Nitophyllum bonnemaisonii (Kylin) Kylin 1934, (Kommetjie to Muizenberg on the Cape Peninsula)
- Holmesia capensis J.Agardh 1890, (Brandfontein eastward, endemic)
- Hymenena venosa (Linnaeus) Krauss 1846, syn. Fucus venosus Linnaeus 1771, Delesseria venosa (Turner) J.V.Lamouroux 1813, (Namibia to southern Cape Peninsula)
- Martensia elegans Hering 1841, syn. Capraella elegans (Harvey) J.De Toni 1936, Mesotrema elegans (Hering) Papenfuss 1942, (Common south coast species, extending into KwaZulu-Natal at least as far as Sodwana Bay)
- Martensia flabelliformis Harvey ex J.Agardh 1863, syn. Capraella flabelliformis (Harvey) J.De Toni 1936, Neomartensia flabelliformis (Harvey ex J.Agardh) Yoshida & Mikami 1996, (Collected once from Sodwana Bay)
- Myriogramme eckloniae Stegenga, Bolton & R.J.Anderson 1997, (Drift material at Muizenberg, endemic)
- Myriogramme livida (J.D.Hooker & Harvey) Kylin 1924, syn. Nitophyllum lividum J.D.Hooker & Harvey 1845, Cryptopleura livida (J.D.Hooker & Harvey) Kützing 1868, (Swakopmund to Kommetjie)
- Myriogramme prostrata (E.Y.Dawson, Neushul & Wildman) M.J.Wynne 1990, syn. Haraldia prostrata E.Y.Dawson, Neushul & Wildman 1960, (Collected only from Sodwana Bay area)
- Neuroglossum binderianum Kützing 1843, (Namibia to southern Cape Peninsula)
- Nienburgia serrata (Suhr) Papenfuss 1956, syn. Nitophyllum serratum Suhr 1836, Scutarius serratus (Suhr) Kuntze 1891, (Cape Hangklip eastwards intoKwaZulu Natal at least as far as Umhloti, north of Durban, endemic)
- Papenfussia laciniata (Harvey) M.D. Guiry 2005?, syn. Pollexfenia laciniata Harvey 1844, (Both sides of the Cape Peninsula, endemic)
- Patulophycus eclipes A.J.K.Millar & M.J.Wynne 1992, (Frequently collected on deep reef systems in southern KwaZulu-Natal)
- Platyclinia sp. (Olifantsbos)
- Platysiphonia delicata (Clemente) Cremades in Cremades & Perez-Cirera 1990, syn. Conferva delicata Clemente 1807, Polysiphonia miniata (C.Agardh) Kützing 1849, (Known from eastern Atlantic, Indian Ocean, Australia and New Zealand. South African distribution not specified, but found in KwaZulu-Natal by implication.)
- Platysiphonia intermedia (Grunow) M.J.Wynne 1983, syn. Sarcomenia intermedia Grunow 1867, (Port Nolloth to Cape Agulhas)
- Pollexfenia minuta (Kylin) Papenfuss 1942, syn. Papenfussia minuta Kylin 1938, (Cape Hangklip to East London, endemic)
- Taenioma perpusillum (J.Agardh) J.Agardh 1863, syn. Polysiphonia perpusilla J.Agardh 1847, (Langebaan lagoon, and Eastern Cape)
- Delesseriaceae vel. aff. (Oudekraal, endemic)

==== Family Inkyuleeaceae ====
- Inkyuleea beckeri (F.Schmitz ex Mazza) H.-G.Choi, Kraft & G.W.Saunders 2000, syn. Ballia beckeri F.Schmitz ex Mazza 1911, (Possibly limited to southern KwaZulu-Natal and Eastern Cape, endemic)

==== Family Rhodomelaceae ====
- Acrocystis nana Zanardini 1872, (Northern KwaZulu-Natal from Island Rock onward)
- Aiolocolax pulchellus M.A.Pocock 1956, (Blaauwberg eastwards)
- Amansia rhodantha (Harvey) J.Agardh 1841, syn. Delesseria rhodantha Harvey 1834, Rytiphlaea rhodantha (Harvey) Decaisne 1842, (Primarily distributed in northern KwaZulu-Natal from Mabibi northwards, with a single collection at Park Rynie)
- Aphanocladia cf. skottsbergii (Levring) Ardré 1969, syn. Pterosiphonia skottsbergii Levring 1941, (Cape Hangklip)
- Bostrychia intricata (Bory de Saint-Vincent) Montagne 1852, syn. Scytonema intricatum Bory de Saint-Vincent 1828, Stictosiphonia intricata (Bory de Saint-Vincent) P.C.Silva 1996, (Saldanha Bay, Kommetjie on Cape Peninsula eastward along whole of south coast)
- Bostrychia moritziana (Sonder ex Kützing) J.Agardh 1863, syn. Polysiphonia moritziana Sonder ex Kützing 1849, (Langebaan lagoon, Mangrove vegetation along Transkei and KwaZulu-Natal coasts)
- Bostrychia scorpioides (Hudson) Montagne 1842, syn. Amphibia scorpioides (Hudson) Stackhouse, Fucus scorpioides Hudson 1762, Rhodomela scorpioides (Hudson) 1822, (Langebaan lagoon. mangrove vegetation along Transkei coast. Does not appear to extend into KwaZulu-Natal)
- Bostrychia tenella (J.V.Lamouroux) J.Agardh 1863, syn. Plocamium tenellum J.V.Lamouroux 1813, (Common along most of the KwaZulu-Natal coast, extending into Mozambique.)
- Chondria armata (Kützing) Okamura 1907, syn. Lophura armata Kützing 1866, (Entire KwaZulu-Natal coast extending into Eastern Cape at learst as far south as Bird Island, Algoa Bay)
- Chondria capensis (Harvey) Askenasy 1888, syn. Laurencia capensis Harvey 1849, Chondriopsis capensis (Harvey) J.Agardh 1863, (Namibia to just east of Cape Agulhas. Southern African endemic.)
- Colacopsis velutina (M.T.Martin & M.A.Pocock) R.E.Norris 1988, syn. Melanocolax velutina M.T.Martin & M.A.Pocock 1953, (Brandfontein to East London, endemic)
- Dasyclonium palmatifidum (Grunow) Scagel 1962, syn. Polyzonia palmatifida Grunow 1874, Euzoniella palmatifida (Grunow) Cuoghi Costantini 1912, (Primarily a south coast species, extending into KwaZulu-Natal as far as Shelly Beach, endemic)
- Dictyomenia stephensonii Papenfuss 1947, (Bashee river mouth (Mbashe) eastward into KwaZulu-Natal as far north as Umhlali Beach, endemic)
- Digenea simplex (Wulfen) C.Agardh 1822, syn. Conferva simplex Wulfen 1803, (Northern KwaZulu-Natal from Mission Rocks northward)
- Falkenbergiella capensis Kylin 1938, (St James, Muizenberg and Swartklip in False Bay. Cape south coast. Endemic)
- Halopithys subopaca (Simons) L.E.Phillips & De Clerck 2005, syn. Digeneopsis subopaca Simons 1970,(Southern Mozanbique and northern KwaZulu-Natal as far south as Mapelane)
- Herposiphonia didymosporangia Stegenga & Kemperman 1987, (St James, Brandfontein and coast of De Hoop nature reserve, Southern African endemic)
- Herposiphonia falcata (Kützing) De Toni 1903, syn. Polysiphonia falcata Kützing 1863, (Brandfontein, endemic)
- Herposiphonia heringii (Harvey) Falkenberg 1901, syn. Polysiphonia heringii Harvey 1847, (Between Hondeklipbaai and St James, endemic)
- Herposiphonia prorepens (Harvey) F.Schmitz 1895, syn. Polysiphonia prorepens Harvey 1847, (Cape Hangklip, Cape south coast to KwaZulu-Natal, endemic)
- Herposiphonia secunda (C.Agardh) Ambronn 1880, syn. Hutchinsia secunda C.Agardh 1824, Polysiphonia secunda (C.Agardh) Zanardini 1840, Herposiphonia tenella f. secunda (C.Agardh) Hollenberg 1968, (Muizenberg, Cape Agulhas eastward to the tropics)
- Janczewskia meridionalis M.T.Martin & M.A.Pocock 1953, (Brandfontein to Northern KwaZulu-Natal, endemic)
- Kentrophora natalensis (J.Agardh) S.M.Wilson & Kraft in R.J.F. Henderson, S.M. Wilson & Kraft 2001, syn. Kuetzingia natalensis J.Agardh 1863, Plectrophora natalensis (J.Agardh) Wilson & Kraft 2000, (From just south of the Eastern Cape/KwaZulu-Natal border eastward into Mozambique)
- Laurencia brongniartii J.Agardh 1841,(Protea Banks in southern KwaZulu-Natal to Saxon Reef near the Mozambique border)
- Laurencia complanata (Suhr) Kützing 1849, syn. Chondria complanata Suhr 1846,(Hluleka, Eastern Cape northward to southern Mozambique, Southern African endemic)
- Laurencia flexuosa Kützing 1849, (False Bay to KwaZulu-Natal at least as far north as Mabibi, endemic)
- Laurencia glomerata (Kützing) Kützing 1849, syn. Chondria glomerata Kützing 1847, (Port Nolloth?, Melbosstrand?, Cape Peninsula eastward)
- Laurencia natalensis Kylin 1938, syn. Laurencia obtusa var. natalensis (Kylin) Børgesen 1945, (Pearly Beach to Agulhas, more abundant along south and east coast, extending into southern Mozambique)
- Laurencia obtusa (Hudson) J.V.Lamouroux 1813, syn. Fucus obtusus Hudson 1778, Chondria obtusa (Hudson) C.Agardh 1817, Sphaerococcus obtusus (Hudson) Wahlenberg 1826, (Cape Hangklip, Brandfontein)
- Laurencia peninsularis Stegenga, Bolton & R.J.Anderson 1987, (False Bay to East London, endemic)
- Laurencia pumila (Grunow) Papenfuss 1943, syn. Laurencia flexuosa var. pumila Grunow 1867, (Tsitsikamma eastward into southern Mozambique)
- Neurymenia fraxinifolia (Mertens ex Turner) J.Agardh 1863, syn. Fucus fraxinifolius Mertens ex Turner 1809, Delesseria fraxinifolia (Mertens ex Turner) C.Agardh 1817, Amansia fraxinifolia (Mertens ex Turner) C.Agardh 1822, Dictyomenia fraxinifolia (Mertens ex Turner) J.Agardh 1841, Epineuron fraxinifolium (Mertens ex Turner) Harvey ex Kützing 1849, (Widespread in Indo-Pacific region, southern limit at Sodwana Bay in KwaZulu-Natal)
- Neurymenia nigricans T.Tanaka & Itono 1969, (KwaZulu-Natal from St Lucia northwards)
- Ophidocladus simpliciusculus (P.L.Crouan & H.M.Crouan) Falkenberg in Schmitz & Falkenberg 1897, syn. Polysiphonia simpliciuscula P.L.Crouan & H.M.Crouan 1852, (Hondeklipbaai?, Platboombaai on Cape Peninsula to Mozambique)
- Osmundaria melvillii (J.Agardh) R.E.Norris 1991, syn. Amansia melvillii J.Agardh 1885, Vidalia melvillii (J.Agardh) F.Schmitz 1895, (Tropical species extending as far south as Sodwana Bay in northern KwaZulu-Natal)
- Osmundaria serrata (Suhr) R.E.Norris 1991, syn. Carpophyllum serratum Suhr 1840, Dictyomenia serrata (Suhr) J.Agardh 1841, Spirhymenia serrata (Suhr) Harvey 1847, Vidalia serrata (Suhr) J.Agardh 1863, Euspiros serratus (Suhr) Kuntze 1891, (Port St. Johns eastward into KwaZulu-Natal as far as Mission Rocks)
- Pachychaeta brachyarthra (Kützing) Trevisan 1875, syn. Griffithsia brachyarthra Kützing 1860, (Cape Agulhas eastward)
- Pachychaeta cryptoclada Falkenberg 1901, (Swartklip, Brandfontein, more common in Eastern Cape, endemic)
- Placophora binderi (J.Agardh) J.Agardh 1863, syn. Amansia binderi J.Agardh 1841, Micramansia binderi (J.Agardh) Kützing 1865, (Kalk Bay on the Cape Peninsula extending along south and east coast to southern Mozambique)
- Placophora monocarpa (Montagne) Papenfuss 1956, syn. Polysiphonia monocarpa Montagne 1842, (Melkbosstrand to Strandfontein in False Bay, possibly further east, endemic)
- Polysiphonia incompta Harvey 1847, (Namibia, the entire South African coast into Mozambique)
- Polysiphonia kowiensis Stegenga, Bolton & R.J.Anderson 1997, (Langebaan Lagoon, Kowie estuary, endemic)
- Polysiphonia namibiensis Stegenga & Engeldow in Stegenga, Bolton & Anderson 1997, (Olifantsbos, Cape Agulhas, Eastern Cape. Southern African endemic)
- Polysiphonia scopulorum Harvey 1855, syn. Vertebrata scopulorum (Harvey) Kuntze 1891, Lophosiphonia scopulorum (Harvey) Womersley 1950, (Muizenberg and Clovelly in False Bay)
- Polysiphonia urbana Harvey 1847, (Port Nolloth to Cape Agulhas. Southern African endemic)
- Polysiphonia virgata (C.Agardh) Sprengel 1827, syn. Hutchinsia virgata C.Agardh 1824, Carradoria virgata (C.Agardh) Kylin 1956, Carradoriella virgata (C.Agardh) P.C.Silva 1996, (Namibia to Brandfontein)
- Polysiphonia sp.1 (Muizenberg, endemic)
- Polysiphonia sp.2 (Betty's Bay, endemic)
- Polyzonia elegans Suhr 1834, (Port Alfred eastward through all KwaZulu-Natal into southern Mozambique)
- Pterosiphonia cloiophylla (C.Agardh) Falkenberg in Schmitz & Falkenberg 1897, syn. Rytiphlaea cloiophylla (C.Agardh) J.Agardh, Rhodomela cloiophylla C.Agardh 1822, Polysiphonia cloiophylla (C.Agardh) J.Agardh 1863, (Namibia, Cape west coast and Cape south coast)
- Pterosiphonia spinifera (Kützing) Ardré 1967, syn. Polysiphonia spinifera Kützing 1843, (Cape Hangklip, KwaZulu-Natal)
- Pterosiphonia stangeri (J.Agardh) Falkenberg 1901, syn. Polysiphonia stangeri J.Agardh 1863, Vertebrata stangeri (J.Agardh) Kuntze 1891, (Swartklip in False Bay, Cape south coast and KwaZulu-Natal. Southern African endemic)
- Pterosiphonia sp. indet. (Near Cape Hangklip, endemic)
- Rhodomelopsis africana M.A.Pocock 1953, (Brandfontein near Cape Agulhas, Cape south coast into KwaZulu-Natal and southern Mozambique.)
- Streblocladia camptoclada (Montagne) Falkenberg 1901, syn. Polysiphonia camptoclada Montagne 1837, (Yzerfontein to Clovelly in False Bay)
- Streblocladia corymbifera (C.Agardh) Kylin 1938, syn. Hutchinsia corymbifera C.Agardh 1828, Polysiphonia corymbifera (C.Agardh) Endlicher 1843, (Saldanha to St. James in False Bay)
- Stromatocarpus parasiticus Falkenberg in Schmitz & Falkenberg 1897, (Blaauwberg to Cape Hangklip, endemic)
- Symphyocladia cf. marchantioides (Harvey) Falkenberg in Schmitz & Falkenberg 1897, syn. Amansia marchantioides Harvey 1855, (Cape Hangklip, endemic)
- Tayloriella tenebrosa (Harvey) Kylin 1938, Polysiphonia tenebrosa Harvey 1847, (Doring Bay, Muizenberg and Glencairn in False Bay eastward, Southern African endemic)

==== Family Spyridiaceae ====
- Spyridia cupressina Kützing 1849, (Probably restricted to Eastern Cape and southern KwaZulu-Natal)
- Spyridia filamentosa (Wulfen) Harvey in Hooker 1833, syn. Fucus filamentosus Wulfen 1803, Hutchinsia filamentosa (Wulfen) C.Agardh 1824, Polysiphonia filamentosa (Wulfen) Sprengel 1827, Ceramium filamentosum (Wulfen) C.Agardh 1828, (Rare in Western Cape. False Bay, Eastern Cape to tropical East Africa)
- Spyridia hypnoides (Bory de Saint-Vincent) Papenfuss 1968, syn. Thamnophora hypnoides Bory de Saint-Vincent 1834, (Palm Beach to Black Rock near the Mozambican border)
- Spyridia plumosa F.Schmitz ex J.Agardh 1897, (Camps Bay, Kowie area, extending into KwaZulu-Natal as far as Shelly Beach, endemic)

==== Family Wrangeliaceae ====
- Anotrichium furcellatum (J.Agardh) Baldock 1976, syn. Griffithsia furcellata J.Agardh 1842, Neomonospora furcellata (J.Agardh) Feldmann-Mazoyer & Meslin 1939, Corynospora furcellata (J.Agardh) Levring 1974, (False Bay, Kowie)
- Anotrichium tenue (C.Agardh) Nägeli 1862, syn. Griffithsia tenuis C.Agardh 1828, (Doring Bay to Cape Agulhas and further east to KwaZulu-Natal)
- Griffithsia confervoides Suhr 1840, (Namibia to KwaZulu-Natal, Southern African endemic)
- Gymnothamnion elegans (Schousboe ex C.Agardh) J.Agardh 1892, syn. Callithamnion elegans Schousboe ex C.Agardh 1828, (Bakoven on Cape Peninsula to KwaZulu-Natal)
- Gymnothamnion elegans var. bisporum Stegenga 1986, (Hout Bay to East London, endemic)
- Hommersandiella humilis (Kützing) Alongi, Cormaci & G.Furnari 2007, syn. Callithamnion humile Kützing 1849, Lomathamnion humile (Kützing) Stegenga 1989, (Namibia to Cape Hangklip, Southern African endemic)
- Lomathamnion capense Stegenga 1984, (Cape Point to Arniston, endemic)
- Pleonosporium filicinum (Harvey ex J.Agardh) De Toni 1903, syn. Halothamnion filicinum Harvey ex J.Agardh 1876, (Swartklip in False Bay to Natal, Southern African endemic)
- Pleonosporium harveyanum (J.Agardh) De Toni 1903, syn. Halothamnion harveyanum J.Agardh 1876, (Namibia to East London, Southern African endemic)
- Pleonosporium paternoster Stegenga 1986, (Paternoster and Oudekraal, endemic)
- Pleonosporium ramulosum (J.Agardh) De Toni 1903, Corynospora ramulosa J.Agardh 1851, (Port Nolloth to southern Cape Peninsula, endemic)
- Ptilothamnion polysporum Gordon-Mills & Wollaston in Wollaston 1984; (Swartklip in False Bay to Mozambique)
- Shepleya elixithamnia Gordon-Mills & R.E.Norris 1986, (Reported only from a few places in southern KwaZulu-Natal and northern Eastern Cape, endemic)
- Spongoclonium caribaeum (Børgesen) M.J.Wynne 2005, syn. Mesothamnion caribaeum Børgesen 1917, Pleonosporium caribaeum (Børgesen) R.E.Norris 1985, (Clovelly in False Bay to KwaZulu-Natal, Widespread in tropical regions.)
- Tiffaniella cymodoceae (Børgesen) E.M.Gordon 1972, syn. Spermothamnion cymodoceae Børgesen 1952, (Platbank on Cape Peninsula to Mozambique)
- Tiffaniella schmitziana (E.S.Barton) Bolton & Stegenga 1987, syn. Spermothamnion schmitzianum E.S.Barton 1893, (Kraalbaai, Strandfontein, Port Elizabeth to Hluleka, endemic)
- Wrangelia argus (Montagne) Montagne 1856, syn. Griffithsia argus Montagne 1841, (Northern KwaZulu-Natal)
- Wrangelia penicillata (C.Agardh) C.Agardh 1828, syn. Griffithsia penicillata C.Agardh 1824, (Northern KwaZulu-Natal)
- Wrangelia purpurifera J.Agardh 1863, (Paternoster to Kowie River, endemic)

=== Order Colaconematales ===
==== Family Colaconemataceae ====
- Colaconema caespitosum (J.Agardh) Jackelman, Stegenga & J.J.Bolton 1991, (Kommetjie eastward entire south coast and Eastern Cape)
- Colaconema codicola (Børgesen) H.Stegenga, J.J.Bolton, & R.J.Anderson 1997, (Kraalbaai in Langebaan lagoon, and Transkei)
- Colaconema daviesii (Dillwyn) Stegenga 1985, (Hondeklipbaai to Transkei)
- Colaconema desmarestiae (Kylin) P.W.Gabrielson 2004, syn. Acrochaetium desmarestiae Kylin 1925, Rhodochorton desmarestiae (Kylin) Drew 1928, Audouinella desmarestiae (Kylin) Garbary, G.I.Hansen & Scagel 1983, (as Audouinella desmarestiae, Northern Cape region)
- Colaconema endophyticum (Batters) J.T.Harper & G.W.Saunders 2002, syn. Acrochaetium endophyticum Batters 1896, Chantransia endophytica (Batters) De Toni 1924, Audouinella endophytica (Batters) P.S.Dixon 1976, (Cape Hangklip)
- Colaconema interpositum (Heydrich) H.Stegenga, J.J.Bolton & R.J.Anderson 1997, (Platbank, Cape Peninsula)
- Colaconema nemalionis (De Notaris ex L.Dufour) Stegenga 1985, (Hondeklip Bay to East London)
- Colaconema panduripodium H.Stegenga, J.J.Bolton & R.J.Anderson 1997, (Hondeklip Bay and Oudekraal, endemic)

=== Order Corallinales ===
==== Family Corallinaceae ====
- Amphiroa anceps (Lamarck) Decaisne 1842, syn. Bostrychia anceps (Lamarck) Decaisne, Corallina anceps Lamarck 1815, (Stilbaai eastwards into KwaZulu-Natal as far north as Mabibi)
- Amphiroa beauvoisii J.V.Lamouroux 1816, (Cape Hangklip to tropical east Africa)
- Amphiroa bowerbankii Harvey 1849, (Stilbaai eastward into KwaZulu-Natal up to Mabibi)
- Amphiroa capensis Areschoug 1852, (Llandudno on Cape Peninsula to Kowie River, endemic)
- Amphiroa ephedraea (Lamarck) Decaisne 1842, syn. Corallina ephedraea Lamarck 1815, (Cape Hangklip to KwaZulu-Natal and Mozambique)
- Arthrocardia carinata (Kützing) Johansen 1984, syn. Corallina carinata Kützing 1858, (South and east coasts)
- Arthrocardia corymbosa (Lamarck) Decaisne 1842, syn. Corallina corymbosa Lamarck 1815, Amphiroa corymbosa (Lamarck) Decaisne 1842, Cheilosporum corymbosum (Lamarck) Decaisne 1842, (Southern Cape Peninsula eastward)
- Arthrocardia flabellata (Kützing) Manza 1940, syn. Corallina flabellata Kützing 1858, (Probably along most of the southern African coast) (Probably along the entire South African coast extending into Mozambique)
- Arthrocardia filicula (Lamarck) Johansen 1984, syn. Corallina filicula Lamarck 1815, Cheilosporum palmatum var. filicula (Lamarck) Yendo 1902, (Namibia and west coast)
- Corallina officinalis Linnaeus 1758, (Oudekraal to Kowie river) (Oudekraal eastward to Mission Rocks)
- Jania cultrata (Harvey) J.H.Kim, Guiry & H.-G.Choi 2007, syn. Amphiroa cultrata Harvey 1849, Cheilosporum cultratum (Harvey) Areschoug 1852, (as Cheilosporum cultratum, Platboombaai on Cape Peninsula to Mozambique)
- Jania adhaerens J.V.Lamouroux 1816, syn. Corallina adhaerens (J.V.Lamouroux) Kützing 1858, (Cape Hangklip eastwards)
- Hydrolithon farinosum (J.V.Lamouroux) D.Penrose & Y.M.Chamberlain 1993, syn. Melobesia farinosa J.V.Lamouroux 1816, Fosliella farinosa (J.V.Lamouroux) M.A.Howe 1920, (Lala Neck, north of Sodwana Bay, KwaZulu-Natal)
- Hydrolithon onkodes (Heydrich) D.Penrose & Woelkerling 1992, syn. Lithothamnion onkodes Heydrich 1897, Goniolithon onkodes (Heydrich) Foslie 1898, Lithophyllum onkodes (Heydrich) Heydrich 1901, Porolithon onkodes (Heydrich) Foslie 1909, Spongites onkodes (Heydrich) Penrose & Woelkerling 1988, (Sodwana Bay in northern KwaZulu-Natal.)
- Hydrolithon pellire Y.M.Chamberlain & R.E.Norris 1994, (Port Alfred in Eastern Cape to Durban in KwaZulu-Natal).
- Hydrolithon samoënse (Foslie) Keats & Y.M.Chamberlain 1994, syn. Lithophyllum samoënse Foslie 1906, Pseudolithophyllum samoënse (Foslie) Adey 1970, (Yzerfontein, Western Cape to Sodwana Bay, KwaZulu-Natal.)
- Hydrolithon superficiale Keats & Y.M.Chamberlain 1994, (Sodwana Bay, KwaZulu-Natal.)
- Jania crassa J.V.Lamouroux 1821, (St. James in False Bay, Eastern Cape and KwaZulu-Natal)
- Jania intermedia (Kützing) P.C.Silva 1996, syn. Corallina intermedia Kützing 1858, (Palm Beach northward into Mozambique)
- Jania prolifera (J.V.Lamouroux) J.H.Kim, Guiry & H.-G.Choi 2007, syn. Corallina prolifera J.V.Lamouroux 1816, Cheilosporum proliferum (J.V.Lamouroux) Hariot 1902, Cheilosporum africanum Manza 1937, (as Cheilosporum proliferum/africanum, Stilbaai eastward extending into Mozambique)
- Jania rosea (Lamarck) Decaisne 1842, syn. Corallina rosea Lamarck 1815, Cornicularia rosea (Lamarck) V.J.Chapman & P.G.Parkinson 1974, Haliptilon roseum (Lamarck) Garbary & H.W.Johansen 1982, (as Haliptilon roseum, Sodwana Bay northwards)
- Jania sagittata (J.V.Lamouroux) Blainville 1834, syn. Corallina sagittata J.V.Lamouroux 1824, Amphiroa sagittata (J.V.Lamouroux) Decaisne 1842, Arthrocardia sagittata (J.V.Lamouroux) Decaisne 1842, Cheilosporum sagittatum (J.V.Lamouroux) Areschoug 1852, (as Cheilosporum sagittatum, Melkbosstrand to northern Mabibi in KwaZulu-Natal.)
- Jania verrucosa J.V.Lamouroux 1816, syn. Corallina verrucosa (Lamouroux) Kützing 1858, (False Bay eastward)
- Lithophyllum acrocamptum Heydrich 1902, syn. Lithophyllum incrustans f. incrassatum Foslie 1900, Lithophyllum incrassatum (Foslie) Foslie 1909, Lithothamnion incrassatum (Foslie) Jadin 1935, (Seaview (Port Elizabeth) to Umdloti (Durban))
- Lithophyllum corallinae (P.L.Crouan & H.M.Crouan) Heydrich 1897, syn. Melobesia corallinae P.L.Crouan & H.M.Crouan 1867, Dermatolithon corallinae (P.L.Crouan & H.M.Crouan) Foslie 1902, Lithophyllum pustulatum var. corallinae (P.L.Crouan & H.M.Crouan) Foslie 1905, Lithophyllum macrocarpum f. corallinae (P.L.Crouan & H.M.Crouan) Foslie 1909, Tenarea corallinae (P.L.Crouan & H.M.Crouan) Notoya 1974, Titanoderma corallinae (P.L.Crouan & H.M.Crouan) Woelkerling, Y.M.Chamberlain & P.C.Silva 1985, (Kommetjie (Western Cape) to KwaZulu-Natal)
- Lithophyllum incrustans R.A.Philippi 1837, syn. Lithothamnion incrustans (Philippi) Foslie 1895, Crodelia incrustans (Philippi) Heydrich 1911, (Coffee Bay (south of Port St. Johns))
- Lithophyllum neoatalayense Masaki 1968, (as Titanoderma neoatalayense, Groenriviermond (Northern Cape) to Cape Agulhas (Western Cape))
- Lithophyllum polycephalum Foslie, syn. Titanoderma polycephalum (Foslie) Woelkerling, Y.M.Chamberlain & P.C.Silva 1985, (as Titanoderma polycephalum, False Bay to Cape Agulhas (Western Cape))
- Lithophyllum pustulatum (J.V.Lamouroux) Foslie 1904, syn. Melobesia pustulata J.V.Lamouroux 1816, Titanoderma pustulatum (J.V.Lamouroux) Nägeli 1858, Dermatolithon pustulatum (J.V.Lamouroux) Foslie 1898, Epilithon pustulatum (J.V.Lamouroux) M.Lemoine 1921, Tenarea pustulata (J.V.Lamouroux) Shameel 1983, (as Titanoderma pustulatum, Occasional throughout the west coast and increasing in abundance toward KwaZulu-Natal where it is particularly abundant.)
- Metamastophora flabellata (Sonder) Setchell 1943, syn. Melobesia flabellata Sonder 1845, Mastophora flabellata (Sonder) Harvey 1849, (Palm Beach northwards into Mozambique)
- Neogoniolithon brassica-florida (Harvey) Setchell & L.R.Mason 1943, syn. Melobesia brassica-florida Harvey 1849, Lithothamnion brassica-florida (Harvey) Areschoug 1852, Goniolithon brassica-florida (Harvey) Foslie 1898, (Algoa Bay, Eastern Cape.)
- Pneophyllum amplexifrons (Harvey) Y.M.Chamberlain & R.E.Norris 1994, syn. Melobesia amplexifrons Harvey 1849, Lithophyllum amplexifrons (Harvey) Heydrich 1897, (Palm Beach, south of Port Shepstone, KwaZulu-Natal, northward into Mozambique.)
- Pneophyllum coronatum (Rosanoff) Penrose in Chamberlain 1994, syn. Melobesia coronata Rosanoff 1866, (Oudekraal, western Cape Peninsula, Western Cape.)
- Pneophyllum fragile Kützing 1843, (Widespread along the west coast.)
- Pneophyllum keatsii Y.M.Chamberlain 1994, (Oudekraal, western Cape Peninsula, Western Cape, to Cape Agulhas, Western Cape.)
- Spongites discoidea (Foslie) D.Penrose & Woelkerling 1988, syn. Lithophyllum discoideum Foslie 1900, Hydrolithon discoideum (Foslie) M.L.Mendoza & J.Cabioch 1985, (Port Nolloth, Northern Cape, to Cape Agulhas, Western Cape.)
- Spongites impar (Foslie) Y.M.Chamberlain 1994, syn. Lithophyllum impar Foslie 1909, (Cape St. Martin just south of St. Helena Bay, Western Cape, to Oudekraal, western Cape Peninsula, Western Cape.)
- Spongites yendoi (Foslie) Y.M.Chamberlain 1993, syn. Lithophyllum yendoi (Foslie) Foslie 1900, Goniolithon yendoi Foslie 1900, Lithothamnion yendoi (Foslie) Lemoine 1965, Pseudolithophyllum yendoi (Foslie) Adey 1970, (Throughout South Africa (Namibia to the Mozambican border). Most abundant along the southern west and south coasts, becoming less common toward the east.)

=== Order Gelidiales ===
==== Family Gelidiaceae ====
- Gelidium abbottiorum R.E.Norris 1990, (Brandfontein to northern KwaZulu-Natal), (Cape Hangklip to Kosi Bay)
- Gelidium applanatum Stegenga, Bolton & R.J.Anderson 1997, (Vulcan Rock off Hout Bay and Muizenberg)
- Gelidium capense (S.G.Gmelin) P.C.Silva in P.C.Silva, E.G.Meñez, & Moe 1987, (Melkbosstrand to Kenton on Sea Eastern Cape. Endemic?)
- Gelidium foliaceum (Okamura) E.M.Tronchin 2002, syn. Gelidium pusillum f. foliaceum Okamura 1934, Onikusa foliacea (Okamura) R.E.Norris 1992,(Between Kei Mouth and Sodwana Bay)
- Gelidium micropterum Kützing 1868, (Cape Peninsula to Knysna)
- Gelidium pristoides (Turner) Kützing 1843, (Sea Point and False Bay eastwards)
- Gelidium pteridifolium R.E.Norris, Hommersand & Fredericq 1987, (Glencairn, Cape Hangklip, Eastern Cape and southern KwaZulu-Natal up to Tinley Manor just north of Durban)
- Gelidium reptans (Suhr) Kylin 1938, syn. Phyllophora reptans Suhr 1841, (Cape Peninsula and False Bay to KwaZulu-Natal and Mozambique)
- Gelidium vittatum (Linnaeus) Kützing 1843, syn. Fucus vittatus Linnaeus 1767, Suhria vittata (Linnaeus) Endlicher 1843, Chaetangium vittatum (Linnaeus) P.G.Parkinson 1981, (Möwe Bay, Nabibia to Brandfontein, drift specimens to Port Elizabeth)
- Ptilophora coppejansii E.M.Tronchin & O.De Clerck 2004, (Protea Banks, endemic)
- Ptilophora diversifolia (Suhr) Papenfuss 1940, syn. Phyllophora diversifolia Suhr 1840, Membranifolia diversifolia (Suhr) Kuntze 1891, (Port Elizabeth to just south of Durban, endemic)
- Ptilophora helenae (Dickinson) R.E.Norris 1987, basionym. Gelidium helenae Dickinson 1950, (Mission Rocks, drift between Mission Rocks and Richards Bay)
- Ptilophora hildebrandtii (Hauck) R.E.Norris 1990, basionym Thysanocladia hildebrandtii Hauck 1886, (Sodwana Bay northwards)
- Ptilophora leliaertii E.M.Tronchin & O.De Clerck 2004, (Protea Banks and drift on nearby beaches)
- Ptilophora pinnatifida J.Agardh 1885, syn. Beckerella pinnatifida (J.Agardh) Kylin 1956, (Just south of Durban in KwaZulu-Natal to Algoa Bay in Eastern Cape)

==== Family Gelidiellaceae ====
- Gelidiella acerosa (Forsskål) Feldmann & G.Hamel 1934, syn. Fucus acerosus Forsskål 1775, Echinocaulon acerosus (Forsskål) Børgesen 1932, (Just south of Sodwana Bay into Mozambique)

==== Family Pterocladiaceae ====
- Pterocladiella caerulescens (Kützing) Santelices & Hommersand 1997, syn. Gelidium caerulescens Kützing 1868, Pterocladia caerulescens (Kützing) Santelices 1976, (Sodwana Bay from 2-mile reef to 7-mile reef)

=== Order Gigartinales ===
==== Family Caulacanthaceae ====
- Caulacanthus ustulatus (Mertens ex Turner) Kützing 1843, syn. Fucus acicularis var. ustulatus Mertens ex Turner 1808, Sphaerococcus ustulatus (Mertens ex Turner) C.Agardh 1828, Gigartina ustulata (Mertens ex Turner) Greville 1830, Hypnea ustulata (Mertens ex Turner) Montagne 1840, Gelidium ustulatum (Mertens ex Turner) J.Agardh 1842, Olivia ustulata (Mertens ex Turner) Montagne 1846, (Whole South African coast)
- Heringia mirabilis (C.Agardh) J.Agardh 1846, syn. Sphaerococcus mirabilis C.Agardh 1820, (Namibia to East london, Southern African endemic)

==== Family Cystocloniaceae ====
- Hypnea ecklonii Suhr 1836, (Pearly Beach to Namibia, Southern African endemic)
- Hypnea musciformis (Wulfen) J.V.Lamouroux 1813, syn. Fucus musciformis Wulfen in Jacquin 1789, Ceramium musciforme (Wulfen) Ruchinger 1818, Sphaerococcus musciformis (Wulfen) C.Agardh 1822, Hypnophycus musciformis (Wulfen) Kützing 1843, (Brandfontein, also south and east coast)
- Hypnea rosea Papenfuss 1947, (Strand in False Bay and Die Walle, just west of Cape Agulhas, and south and east coasts, endemic)
- Hypnea spicifera (Suhr) Harvey in J. Agardh 1847, syn. Gracilaria spicifera Suhr 1834, Hypnophycus spicifera (Suhr) Kützing 1843, (virtually the entire South African coast, Southern African endemic)
- Hypnea tenuis Kylin 1938, (Mainly south and east coast, as far west as Swartklip in False Bay)
- Hypnea viridis Papenfuss 1947, (Isipingo northwards into southern Mozambique, Southern African endemic)
- Rhodophyllis reptans (Suhr) Papenfuss 1956, syn. Halymenia reptans Suhr 1834, Euhymenia reptans (Suhr) Kützing 1849, Kallymenia reptans (Suhr) E.S.Barton 1893, (Hondeklipbaai to KwaZulu-Natal, Southern African endemic)

==== Family Dumontiaceae ====
- Gibsmithia hawaiiensis Doty 1963, (Known from only a few locations in northern KwaZulu-Natal)

==== Family Gigartinaceae ====
- Chondracanthus teedei (Mertens ex Roth) Kützing 1843, syn. Ceramium teedei Mertens ex Roth 1806, Gigartina teedei (Mertens ex Roth) J.V.Lamouroux 1813, (Kraalbaai in Langebaan Lagoon, and Eastern Cape)
- Gigartina bracteata (S.G.Gmelin) Setchell & N.L.Gardner 1933, syn. Fucus bracteatus S.G.Gmelin 1768, (Namibia to Cape of Good Hope, drift material from Muizenberg, Southern African endemic)
- Gigartina insignis (Endlicher & Diesing) F.Schmitz in E.S.Barton 1896, syn. Iridaea insignis Endlicher & Diesing 1845, (Muizenberg, Cape Hangklip to Kowie River, Southern African endemic)
- Gigartina pistillata (S.G.Gmelin) Stackhouse 1809, syn. Fucus pistillatus S.G.Gmelin 1768, (Smitswinkel Bay and Swartklip east to the Kowie area)
- Gigartina tysonii Reinbold in Tyson 1912, (Three Anchor Bay to Camps Bay, drift specimens from Platboombaai and Olifantsbos, endemic)
- Iridaea convoluta (Areschoug ex J Agardh) Hewitt 1960, syn. Gigartina convoluta Areschoug ex J.Agardh 1899, (Table Bay to Cape of Good Hope, endemic)
- Mazzaella capensis (J.Agardh) Fredericq in Hommersand et al. 1993, Iridaea capensis J.Agardh 1848, Iridophycus capensis (J.Agardh) Setchell & N.L.Gardner 1936, Gigartina capensis (J.Agardh) D.H.Kim 1976, (Port Nolloth to Cape Agulhas, extending into Namibia, Southern African endemic)
- Rhodoglossum alcicorne Stegenga, Bolton & R.J.Anderson 1997, (Hout Bay, endemic)
- Sarcothalia radula (Esper) Edyvane & Womersley 1994, syn. Fucus radula Esper 1802, Sphaerococcus radula (Esper) C.Agardh 1822, Iridaea radula (Esper) Bory de Saint-Vincent 1828, Gigartina radula (Esper) J.Agardh 1851, (Port Nolloth to Cape Agulhas, rare at De Hoop, extending into Namibia)
- Sarcothalia scutellata (Hering) Leister 1993, syn. Sphaerococcus scutellatus Hering 1841, Dicurella scutellata (Hering) Papenfuss 1940, Gigartina scutellata (Hering) Simons 1983, (Namibia to Cape Hangklip)
- Sarcothalia stiriata (Turner) Leister in Hommersand, Guiry, Fredericq & Leister 1993, syn. Fucus stiriata Turner 1807, Sphaerococcus stiriatus (Turner) C.Agardh 1817, Sphaerococcus radula var. stiriatus (Turner) Rudolphi 1831, Mastocarpus stiriatus (Turner) Kützing 1843, Gigartina stiriata (Turner) J.Agardh 1851, (Namibia and Port Nolloth to Cape Agulhas)

==== Family Kallymeniaceae ====
- Kallymenia agardhii R.E.Norris 1964, (Namibia to Cape Agulhas, Southern African endemic)
- Kallymenia schizophylla J.Agardh 1848, (Namibia to southern Cape Peninsula and Cape Hangklip. Southern African endemic)
- Pugetia harveyana (J.Agardh) R.E.Norris 1964, syn. Kallymenia harveyana J.Agardh 1844, (Namibia to southern Cape Peninsula, Drift material from Muizenberg)
- Thamnophyllis discigera (J.Agardh) R.E.Norris 1964, syn. Rhodymenia discigera J.Agardh 1841, Callophyllis discigera (J.Agardh) J.Agardh 1847, (Port Nolloth to Cape Agulhas)
- Thamnophyllis pocockiae R.E.Norris 1964, (St Helena bay to East London)

==== Family Phacelocarpaceae ====
- Phacelocarpus oligacanthus Kützing 1868, syn. Phacelocarpus tortuosus var. oligacanthus (Kützing) De Toni 1900, (Cape Agulhas to Widenham near Umkomaas, endemic)
- Phacelocarpus tortuosus Endlicher & Diesing 1845, (KwaZulu-Natal, unspecified range)
- Phacelocarpus tristichus J.Agardh 1885, (Sodwana Bay northward)

==== Family Phyllophoraceae ====
- Ahnfeltiopsis complicata (Kützing) P.C.Silva & DeCew 1992, syn. Chondrus complicatus Kützing 1849, Gymnogongrus complicatus (Kützing) Papenfuss 1943, (Namibia to False Bay, Southern African endemic)
- Ahnfeltiopsis glomerata (J.Agardh) P.C.Silva & DeCew 1992, syn. Gymnogongrus glomeratus J.Agardh 1849, (Namibia to Cape Agulhas, Southern African endemic)
- Ahnfeltiopsis intermedia (Kylin) Stegenga, Bolton & R.J.Anderson 1997, syn. Gymnogongrus intermedius Kylin 1938, (Kalk Bay, Sea Point and possibly Keurboomstrand in Plettenberg Bay)
- Ahnfeltiopsis polyclada (Kützing) P.C.Silva & DeCew 1992, syn. Chondrus polycladus Kützing 1849, Gymnogongrus polycladus (Kützing) J.Agardh 1851, (False Bay to Brandfontein, possibly Melkbosstrand and Postberg)
- Ahnfeltiopsis vermicularis (C.Agardh) P.C.Silva & DeCew 1992, syn. Sphaerococcus vermicularis C.Agardh 1817, Gymnogongrus vermicularis (C.Agardh) J.Agardh 1851, (Hondeklipbaai to False Bay, South African endemic)
- Gymnogongrus dilatatus (Turner) J.Agardh 1851, syn. Fucus dilatatus Turner 1811, Sphaerococcus dilatatus (Turner) C.Agardh 1817, Pachycarpus dilatatus (Turner) Kützing 1843, (Namibia to southern Cape Peninsula, drift material from Muizenberg)
- Gymnogongrus tetrasporifer Papenfuss in R.A.Anderson & Bolton 1990, (Port Alfred eastwards extending into KwaZulu-Natal as far north as Bhanga Nek, endemic)
- Schottera nicaeensis (J.V.Lamouroux ex Duby) Guiry & Hollenberg 1975, syn. Halymenia nicaeensis J.V.Lamouroux ex Duby 1830, Rhodymenia palmetta var. nicaeënsis (Lamouroux ex Duby) J.Agardh 1842, Rhodymenia nicaeensis (J.V.Lamouroux ex Duby) Montagne 1846, Gymnogongrus nicaeënsis (J.V.Lamouroux ex Duby) Ardissone & Straforello 1877, Phyllophora nicaeënsis (J.V.Lamouroux ex Duby) F.Schmitz 1893, Petroglossum nicaeensis (Duby) Schotter 1953, (Known from several localities in southern KwaZulu-Natal)

==== Family Rhizophyllidaceae ====
- Portieria hornemannii (Lyngbye) P.C.Silva in P.C. Silva, Meñez & Moe 1987, syn. Desmia hornemannii Lyngbye 1819, Chondrococcus hornemannii (Lyngbye) F.Schmitz 1895, (Table Bay, False Bay, south and east coast, extending into Mozambique)
- Portieria tripinnata (Hering) De Clerck in De Clerck, Tronchin & Schils 2005, syn. Rhodymenia tripinnata Hering in Krauss 1846, (Haga Haga near Kei Mouth to Mission Rocks)

==== Family Solieriaceae ====
- Meristotheca papulosa (Montagne) J.Agardh 1872, syn. Kallymenia papulosa Montagne 1850, Eucheuma papulosa (Montagne) A.D.Cotton & Yendo 1914, (Protea Banks to Mabibi)

=== Order Gracilariales ===
==== Family Gracilariaceae ====
- Gracilaria aculeata (Hering) Papenfuss 1967, syn. Gelidium aculeatum Hering 1846, (Kenton near Port Alfred eastward into KwZulu-Natal as far as Cape Vidal)
- Gracilaria canaliculata Sonder 1871, (Cape Vidal northwards into Mozambique)
- Gracilaria corticata (J.Agardh) J.Agardh 1852: (1851-1863), syn. Rhodymenia corticata J.Agardh 1841, Sphaerococcus corticatus (J.Agardh) Kützing 1849, (Port Edward northwards into Mozambique)
- Gracilaria denticulata F.Schmitz ex Mazza 1907, syn. Tylotus denticulatus (F.Schmitz ex Mazza) Papenfuss, (Kenton near Port Alfred eastward into Mozanbique)
- Gracilaria salicornia (C.Agardh) E.Y.Dawson 1954, syn. Sphaerococcus salicornia C.Agardh 1820, Corallopsis salicornia (C.Agardh) Greville 1830, (Cape Vidal northwards)
- Gracilaria verrucosa (Hudson) Papenfuss 1950, syn. Fucus verrucosus Hudson 1762, (recorded from: St Helena Bay, Velddrif, Saldanha Bay, Langebaan Lagoon, Table Bay, False bay, Swartkops River)
- Gracilaria vieillardii P.C.Silva in Silva, Meñez & Moe 1987, (Most of KwaZulu-Natal coast)
- Gracilariopsis lemaneiformis(Bory de Saint-Vincent) E.Y.Dawson, Acleto & Foldvik 1964, syn. Gigartina lemaneiformis Bory de Saint-Vincent 1828, Gracilaria lemaneiformis (Bory de Saint-Vincent) Greville 1830, Cordylecladia lemanaeformis (Bory de Saint-Vincent) M.A.Howe 1914, (Simon's Town in False Bay)

==== Family Pterocladiophilaceae ====
- Gelidiocolax suhriae (M.T.Martin & M.A.Pocock) K.-C.Fan & Papenfuss 1959, syn. Choreocolax suhriae M.T.Martin & M.A.Pocock 1953, (Blaauwberg to Strandfontein, endemic)

=== Order Halymeniales ===
==== Family Halymeniaceae ====
- Carpopeltis maillardii (Montagne & Millardet) Chiang 1970. syn. Phyllophora maillardii Montagne & Millardet 1862, (Durban northwards extending into Mozambique)
- Carpopeltis phyllophora (J.D.Hooker & Harvey) F.Schmitz in Schmitz & Hauptfleish 1897, syn. Acropeltis phyllophora J.D.Hooker & Harvey 1847, Cryptonemia phyllophora (J.D.Hooker & Harvey) J.Agardh 1872, (Palm Beach northward)
- Codiophyllum natalense J.E.Gray 1872, (Probably from Port Alfred to Protea Bamks in southern KwaZulu-Natal)
- Cryptonemia natalensis (J.Agardh) Chiang 1970, syn. Meristotheca natalensis J.Agardh 1876, (Kenton on Sea eastwards extending into KwaZulu-Natal as far as Durban, endemic)
- Grateloupia doryphora (Montagne) M.A.Howe 1914, syn. Halymenia doryphora Montagne 1839, (Port Nolloth to Cape Agulhas)
- Grateloupia filicina (J.V.Lamouroux) C.Agardh 1822, syn. Delesseria filicina J.V.Lamouroux 1813, (Whole west coast and south coast to Eastern Cape as far as the Kowie area)
- Halymenia durvillei Bory de Saint-Vincent 1828, (Sodwana Bay northwards into Mozambique)
- Pachymenia orbitosa (Suhr) L.K.Russell in L.K. Russell et al. 2009' syn. Iridaea orbitosa Suhr 1840, Aeodes orbitosa (Suhr) F.Schmitz 1894, (Whole Cape west coast, extending into Namibia, and eastward at least as far as Cape Agulhas, endemic)
- Pachymenia carnosa (J.Agardh) J.Agardh 1876, syn. Platymenia carnosa J.Agardh 1848. Iridaea carnosa (J.Agardh) Kützing 1849, Schizymenia carnosa (J.Agardh) J.Agardh 1851, (Whole west coast into Namibia, eastward to Brandtfontein)
- Pachymenia cornea (Kützing) Chiang 1970, syn. Iridaea cornea Kützing 1867, Cyrtymenia cornea (Kützing) F.Schmitz 1897, Phyllymenia cornea (Kützing) Setchell & Gardner 1936, (Doring Bay to East London)
- Polyopes constrictus (Turner) J.Agardh 1851, syn. Fucus constrictus Turner 1809, Sphaerococcus constrictus (Turner) C.Agardh 1822, Gelidium constrictum (Turner) Kützing 1849, (Doring Bay to Kei River mouth)
- Prionitis filiformis Kylin 1941, (Port Elizabeth to Port Edward, endemic)
- Prionitis nodifera (Hering) E.S.Barton 1896, syn. Sphaerococcus nodifer Hering 1841, Gigartina nodifera (Hering) Hering 1846, Mammillaria nodifera (Hering) Kuntze 1891, Zanardinula nodifera (Hering) De Toni fil. 1936, (Three Sisters at Riet River, 10 km west of Port Alfred to Mission Rocks, endemic)
- Thamnoclonium dichotomum (J.Agardh) J.Agardh 1876, syn. Polyphacum dichotomum J.Agardh 1841, Thamnoclonium hirsutum var. africanum Kützing 1849, Thamnoclonium claviferum J.Agardh 1876, Thamnoclonium codioides J.Agardh 1876, (Predominantly restricted to southern KwaZulu-Natal, but extending into northern KwZulu-Natal as far as Sodwana Bay)

==== Family Tsengiaceae ====
- Tsengia lanceolata (J.Agardh) Saunders & Kraft 2002, syn. Nemastoma lanceolatum J.Agardh 1847, (Hondeklipbaai to Cape Hangklip)
- Tsengia pulchra (Baardseth) Masuda & Guiry 1994, syn. Nemastoma pulchrum Baardseth 1941, (found only once at the Cape of Good Hope)

=== Order Hildenbrandiales ===
==== Family Hildenbrandiaceae ====
- Hildenbrandia lecannellieri Hariot 1887, (Entire west coast and east coast as far as Port Elizabeth)
- Hildenbrandia rubra (Sommerfelt) Meneghini 1841, (Probably the whole of the west coast)

=== Order Nemaliales ===
==== Family Galaxauraceae ====
- Dichotomaria diesingiana (Zanardini) Huisman, J.T.Harper & G.W.Saunders 2004, syn. Galaxaura diesingiana Zanardini 1846, (Arniston eastward to Mission Rocks and Cape Vidal)
- Dichotomaria obtusata (J.Ellis & Solander) Lamarck 1816, syn. Corallina obtusata J.Ellis & Solander 1786, Galaxaura obtusata (J.Ellis & Solander) J.V.Lamouroux 1816, (as Galaxaura obtusata, Protea Banks northward)
- Dichotomaria tenera (Kjellman) Huisman, J.T.Harper & G.W.Saunders 2004, syn. Galaxaura tenera Kjellman 1900, (Isipingo northwards)
- Galaxaura rugosa (J.Ellis & Solander) J.V.Lamouroux 1816, syn. Corallina rugosa J.Ellis & Solander 1786, (Sodwana northward)
- Tricleocarpa cylindrica (J.Ellis & Solander) Huisman & Borowitzka 1990, syn. Corallina cylindrica J.Ellis & Solander 1786, Galaxaura cylindrica (J.Ellis & Solander) J.V.Lamouroux 1821, Halysium cylindricum (J.Ellis & Solander) Kützing 1843, (Jesser Point at Sodwana northwards)

==== Family Liagoraceae ====
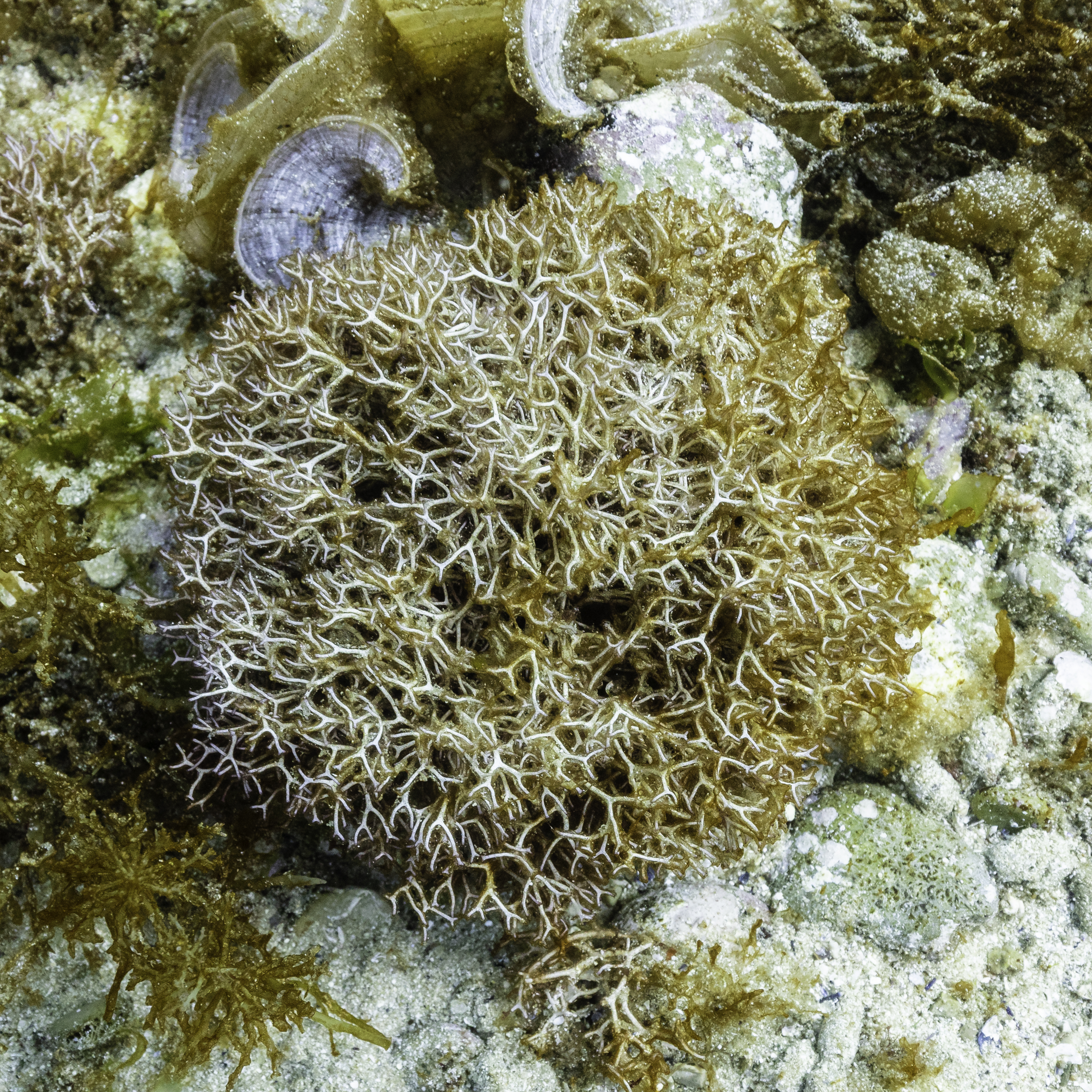
Liagora viscida.

- Helminthocladia papenfussii Kylin 1938, (Oudekraal eastward at least as far as Cape Morgan)
- Helminthora furcellata (Reinbold ex Tyson) M.T.Martin 1947, (Endemic, Three Anchor Bay to Cape Hangklip)
- Liagora ceranoides J.V.Lamouroux 1816, syn/ Liagora viscida f. ceranoides (J.V.Lamouroux) Hauck 1882, (Sodwana Bay)
- Neoizziella divaricata (C.K.Tseng) S.M.Lin, S.-Y.Yang & Huisman 2011, syn. Liagora divaricata C.K.Tseng 1941, (as Liagora divaricata, Sodwana Bay)

==== Family Scinaiaceae ====
- Nothogenia erinacea (Turner) P.G.Parkinson 1983, (Cape Fria, Namibia to East London)
- Nothogenia ovalis (Suhr) P.G.Parkinson 1983, syn. Dumontia ovalis Suhr 1840, (Endemic, Möwe Bay, Namibia to Cape Agulhas)
- Scinaia capensis (Setchell) Huisman 1985, syn. Gloiophloea capensis Setchell 1914, (Endemic, Melkbosstrand to Kowie area of Eastern Cape)
- Scinaia salicornioides (Kützing) J.Agardh 1851, syn. Ginnania salicornioides Kützing, (Endemic, Muizenberg to east coast)

=== Order Nemastomatales ===
==== Family Nemastomataceae ====
- Predaea feldmannii Børgesen 1950, (Known only from Sodwana Bay)

==== Family Schizymeniaceae ====
- Haematocelis sp. vel aff. (Melkbosstrand)
- Platoma cyclocolpum (Montagne) F.Schmitz 1894, Halymenia cyclocolpa Montagne 1841, (Only collected once at Wright Canyon in Sodwana Bay)
- Schizymenia apoda (J.Agardh) J.Agardh 1851, syn. Platymenia apoda J.Agardh 1848, Platymenia undulata var. obovata J.Agardh 1848, Schizymenia obovata (J.Agardh) J.Agardh 1851, (Port Nolloth to Cape Agulhas)

=== Order Palmariales ===
==== Family Meiodiscaceae ====
- Meiodiscus concrescens (K.M.Drew) P.W.Gabrielson in Gabrielsen et al. 2000, syn. Audouinella concrescens (K.M.Drew) P.S.Dixon 1976, Rhodochorton concrescens, K.M. Drew 1928, (Hout Bay)

==== Family Rhodophysemataceae ====
- Rhodophysema feldmannii Cabioch 1975, (Hout Bay to Platbank on Cape Peninsula)

==== Family Rhodothamniellaceae ====
- Rhodothamniella floridula (Dillwyn) Feldmann in T.Christensen 1978, (Lambert's Bay to Hluleka, Transkei)

=== Order Peyssonneliales ===
==== Family Peyssonneliaceae ====
- Peyssonnelia atropurpurea P.L.Crouan & H.M.Crouan 1867, (Yzerfontein to Brandfontein)
- Sonderophycus capensis (Montagne) M.J.Wynne 2011, Peyssonnelia capensis Montagne 1847, Pterigospermum capense (Montagne) Kuntze 1891, Sonderopelta capensis (Montagne) A.D.Krayesky 2009, (as Peyssonnelia capensis, Hout Bay on Cape Peninsula eastwards extending into Mozambique)
- Peyssonnelia replicata Kützing 1847, syn. Pterigospermum replicatum (Kützing) Kuntze 1891, (Palm Beach to St Lucia, endemic)

=== Order Plocamiales ===
==== Family Plocamiaceae ====
- Plocamiocolax papenfussianus M.F.Martin & M.A.Pocock 1953, (Melkbosstrand to East London, endemic) (Arniston north to Rabbit Rock in KwaZulu-Natal)
- Plocamium beckeri F.Schmitz ex Simons 1964, (Collected at Muizenberg, Eastern Cape and KwaZulu-Natal)
- Coral plocamium Plocamium corallorhiza (Turner) J.D.Hooker & Harvey 1845, syn. Fucus corallorhiza Turner 1808, Thamnophora corallorhiza (Turner) C.Agardh 1822, (Yzerfontein to KwaZulu-Natal extending into southern Mozambique)
- Plocamium cornutum (Turner) Harvey 1849, syn. Fucus cornutus Turner 1819, Thamnophora cornuta (Turner) Greville 1830, Thamnocarpus cornutus (Turner) Kützing 1843, (entire coastline of the Western Cape to Namibia, rarer in the Eastern Cape, Southern African endemic)
- Plocamium glomeratum J.Agardh 1851, (Namibia to Still Bay, Southern African endemic)
- Plocamium maxillosum (Poiret) J.V.Lamouroux 1813, syn. Fucus maxillosus Poiret 1808, (Hondeklipbaai to Cape Agulhas, endemic)
- Plocamium rigidum Bory de Saint-Vincent in Bélanger & Bory de Saint-Vincent 1834, syn. Nereidea rigida (Bory de Saint-Vincent) Kuntze 1891, (Namibia to Eastern Cape, Southern African endemic)
- Plocamium suhrii Kützing 1849, (False Bay eastward) (Stilbaai eastwards into KwaZulu-Natal as far north as Mission Rocks)
- Plocamium telfairiae (W.J.Hooker & Harvey) Harvey ex Kützing 1849, syn. Thamnophora telfairiae W.J.Hooker & Harvey 1834, Bonnemaisonia telfairiae (W.J.Hooker & Harvey) Endlicher 1843, Nereidea telfairiae (W.J.Hooker & Harvey) Kuntze 1891, (Cape Vidal northwards extending into southern Mozambique)
- Plocamium sp. indet. (False Bay coast, endemic?)

==== Family Sarcodiaceae ====
- Sarcodia dentata (Suhr) R.E.Norris 1987, syn. Halymenia dentata Suhr 1834, Kallymenia dentata (Suhr) J.Agardh 1848, Halymenia carnosa var. dentata (Suhr) Kützing 1849, Anatheca dentata (Suhr) Papenfuss 1940, (Swartklip, Die Walle just west of Cape Agulhas, Eastern Cape and KwaZulu-Natal, Southern African endemic)
- Trematocarpus flabellatus (J.Agardh) De Toni 1900, syn. Phyllotylus flabellatus J.Agardh 1847, Dicurella flabellata (J.Agardh) J.Agardh 1852, (Lüderitz to Port Elizabeth, Southern African endemic)
- Trematocarpus fragilis (C.Agardh) De Toni 1900, syn. Sphaerococcus fragilis C.Agardh 1822, Chondrus fragilis (C.Agardh) Greville 1830, Dicurella fragilis (C.Agardh) J.Agardh 1852, (Port Nolloth to Brandfontein, Southern African endemic)

=== Order Rhodymeniales ===
==== Family Champiaceae ====
- Champia compressa Harvey 1838, (False Bay eastward to northern KwaZulu-Natal and extending into Mozambique. Rarer on west side of Cape Peninsula and also found at Kraalbaai and Paternoster)
- Champia indica Børgesen 1933, (Known only from Sodwana Bay)
- Chylocladia capensis Harvey 1849, (Namibia to Transkei, Southern African endemic)

==== Family Faucheaceae ====
- Gloiocladia spinulosa (Okamura & Segawa) Sánchez & Rodríguez-Prieto in Rodriguez-Prieto et al. 2007, syn. Fauchea spinulosa Okamura & Segawa 1935, (as Fauchea spinulosa, Protea Banks, drift near Cape Vidal)

==== Family Hymenocladiaceae ====
- Erythrymenia obovata F.Schmitz ex Mazza 1921, (Port Alfred eastward to Shelly Beach in southern KwaZulu-Natal, endemic)

==== Family Lomentariaceae ====
- Ceratodictyon repens (Kützing) R.E.Norris 1987, syn. Gelidium repens Kützing 1868, Gelidiopsis repens (Kützing) Weber-van Bosse 1928, (as Gelidiopsis repens, Sodwana Bay northwards)
- Lomentaria diffusa Stegenga, Bolton & R.J.Anderson 1997, (Saldanha Bay and Kraalbaai to Brandfontein, endemic)

==== Family Rhodymeniaceae ====
- Botryocladia paucivesicaria Stegenga, Bolton & R.J.Anderson 1997, (Known from drift specimens collected on the west side of Cape peninsula at Noordhoek Beach and Olifantsbos, endemic)
- Botryocladia leptopoda (J.Agardh) Kylin 1931, syn. Chrysymenia uvaria var. leptopoda J.Agardh 1876, Chrysymenia leptopoda (J.Agardh) Weber-van Bosse 1928, (Collected once at 5 Mile Reef, Sodwana Bay, also from drift near Lala Nek)
- Botryocladia madagascariensis G.Feldmann 1945, (Bird Island in Algoa Bay eastwards into KwaZulu-Natal as far as Isipingo)
- Halichrysis irregularis (Kützing) A.J.K.Millar 2005, syn. Iridaea irregularis Kützing 1867, Herpophyllon coalescens Farlow 1902, Halichrysis coalescens (Farlow) R.E.Norris & A.J.K.Millar 1991, (as Halichrysis coalescens, Trafalgar northwards into Mozambique)
- Rhodymenia capensis J.Agardh 1894, syn. Epymenia capensis (J.Agardh) Papenfuss 1940,
- Rhodymenia holmesii Ardissone 1893, (drift material from Olifantsbos) (Southern half of the Cape Peninsula, endemic)
- Rhodymenia natalensis Kylin 1938, (From Namibia along the whole of the South African coast extending into southern Mozambique)
- Rhodymenia obtusa (Greville) Womersley 1996, syn. Phyllophora obtusa Greville 1831, Epymenia obtusa (Greville) Kützing 1849, (Muizenberg and the southern Cape Peninsula to Namibia)
- Rhodymenia pseudopalmata (J.V.Lamouroux) P.C.Silva 1952, syn. Fucus pseudopalmatus J.V.Lamouroux 1805, Delesseria pseudopalmata (J.V.Lamouroux) J.V.Lamouroux 1813, (From drift at Strandfontein)

== Class Rhodophyta incertae sedis ==
=== Order Rhodophycophyta incertae sedis ===
==== Family Rhodophycophyta incertae sedis ====
- Callophycus condominius R.E.Norris 1987, (Rocky Bay northwards, probably extending into southern Mozambique)
- Callophycus densus (Sonder) Kraft 1984, syn. Thysanocladia densa Sonder 1871, (Olifantsbos to southern KwaZulu-Natal)
- Callophycus tridentifer Kraft 1984, (Port Edward to Scottsburgh)

== Class: Stylonematophyceae ==
=== Order: Stylonematales ===
==== Family Stylonemataceae ====
- Stylonema alsidii (Zanardini, 1840) K.M.Drew 1956, (Saldanha Bay southward, and south coast of Western Cape, Eastern Cape to Kwa-Zulu Natal)
- Neevea cf repens Batters 1900, (Hout Bay)

== See also ==
- List of green seaweeds of South Africa
- List of brown seaweeds of South Africa

== Geographical position of places mentioned in species ranges ==
- Algoa Bay, Eastern Cape, 33°55'S 25°42'E
- Aliwal shoal, KwaZulu-Natal, 30°15'30"S 30°49'30"E
- Arniston (Waenhuiskrans), Western Cape, 34°40'S 20°14'E
- Betty's Bay, Western Cape, 34°22'S 18°56'E
- Bhanga Neck, KwaZulu-Natal, 27°01'00"S 32°50'00"E
- Bird Island, Eastern Cape, 33°50'28S 26°17'10E
- Blaauwberg, Western Cape, 33°48'S 18°27'E
- Black Rock, Northern KwaZulu-Natal, 27°08'00"S 32°50'00"E
- Brandfontein, Western Cape, 34°46'S 19°52'E
- Buffelsbaai (Cape Peninsula), Western Cape, 34°19'10"S 18°27'41"E
- Buffelsbaai (west coast), Western Cape, 33°35'S 18°21'E
- Buffelsbaai (south coast), Western Cape, 34°05'S 22°58'E
- Cape Agulhas, Western Cape, 34°50'00"S 20°00'09E
- Cape Columbine, Western Cape, 32°49'39"S 17°51'23"E
- Cape Frio, Namibia, 18°26'12"S 12°00'17"E
- Cape of Good Hope, Western Cape, 34°21'29"S 018°28'19"E (sometimes used historically to refer to the Cape Province, or South Africa)
- Cape Peninsula, Western Cape 34°12'S 18°24'E
- Cape Hangklip, Western Cape, 34°23'17" 018°49'35"
- Cape Infanta, Western Cape, 34°25'S 20°51'E
- Clovelly, False Bay, Western Cape, 34°09'29"S 18°26'11"E
- Dalebrook, False Bay, Western Cape, 34°07'29"S 18°27'11"E
- Danger Point, Western Cape, 34°37'55"S 19°17'34"E
- De Hoop, Western Cape, (just west of Cape Infanta) 32°26'03S 20°32'52E
- De Walle, (Die Walle), (Just west of Agulhas) °'S °'E
- Die Dam (Quoin Point), Western Cape, 34°46'S 19°41'E
- Doring Bay (Doringbaai), Western Cape, 31°49'S 18°14'E
- Durban, KwaZulu-Natal, 29°51'S 31°01'00"E
- Dwesa, Eastern Cape, 32°15'36"S 28°53'42"E
- East London, Eastern Cape, 32°59'S 027°52'E
- False Bay, Western Cape, 34°14'S 18°39'E
- Glencairn, False Bay, Western Cape, 34°09'50"S 18°26'00"E
- Groenrivier (Groen River), 30°50'55"S 17°34'20"E
- Groot Bergrivier estuary (Berg River, Velddrif), Western Cape, 32°47'S 18°10'E
- Haga Haga, Eastern Cape (N of E.London) 32°46'S 28°15'E
- The Haven, Eastern Cape, 150 km west of Port St. Johns, 32°14'50 28°55'15"E
- Hermanus, Western Cape, 34°25'S 19°14'E
- Hluleka, Eastern Cape, 31°49'S 29°18'E
- Hondeklipbaai, Northern Cape, 30°19'S 17°16'E
- Hout Bay, Cape Peninsula, Western Cape, 34°03'30"S 18°21'20"E
- Isipingo, KwaZulu-Natal, 29°59'50"S 30°57'20"E
- Island Rock, KwaZulu-Natal, 27°17'00"S 32°46'00"E
- Kalk Bay, False Bay, Western Cape, 34°07'40"S 18°27'00"E
- Kei River, Eastern Cape, 32°40'35"S 28°23'10"E
- Kenton-on-Sea, Eastern Cape, 33°42'S 26°41'E
- Keurboomstrand, Plettenberg Bay, Western Cape, 34°02'17"S 23°23'31"E
- Knysna, Western Cape, 34°05'02"S 23°03'37"E
- Kommetjie, Western Cape, 34°08'S 18°19'E
- Koppie Alleen, De Hoop, Western Cape, °'S °'E
- Kosi Bay, Kwa-Zulu-Natal, 26°54'06"S 32°51'59"E
- Kowie River, Eastern Cape, 33°36'15"S 26°54'12"E
- Kraalbaai, Langebaan lagoon, Western Cape, 33°08'30"S 18°01'45"E
- Lala Nek, KwaZulu-Natal, 27°13'00S 32°48'00E
- Lamberts Bay, Western Cape, 32°05'24"S 18°18'10"E
- Leadsman shoal, KwaZulu-Natal, 28°23'00S 32°25'15E
- Langebaan Lagoon, Western Cape, 33°09'S 18°04'E
- Llandudno, Cape Peninsula, Western Cape, 34°00'30"S 18°20'20"E
- Lüderitz, Namibia, 26°38'53"S 15°9'34"E
- Mabibi, Kwa-Zulu-Natal, 29°20'10"S 32°45'10"E
- Mapelane, Maphelana, KwaZulu-Natal, near St. Lucia, 28°24'28"S 32°25'44"E
- Melkbosstrand, Western Cape, 33°43'38"S 18°26'06"E
- Mission Rocks, KwaZulu-Natal, 28°16'23"S 32°29'55"E
- Mkambati, KwaZulu-Natal, 31°17'S 29°57'E
- Morgan's Bay, Eastern Cape, (Near Kei mouth) 32°42'0"S 28°21'0"E
- Möwe Bay, Namibia, 19°22′47.85″S 12°42′29.02″E (Möwe Point lighthouse)
- Mtwalume river, KwaZulu-Natal, °'S °'E
- Noordhoek, Cape Peninsula, Western Cape, 34°07'S 18°21'E
- Muizenberg, False Bay, Western Cape, 34°07'S 018°28'E
- Oatlands Point, False Bay, Western Cape, 34°12'30"S 18°27'44"E
- Oudekraal, Cape Peninsula, Western Cape, 33°59'09"S 18°20'55"E
- Olifantsbos, Cape Peninsula, Western Cape, 34°16'23"S 18°22'45"E
- Palm Beach, South Africa, 30°59'S 30°16'E
- Park Rynie, KwaZulu-Natal, 30°19'S 30°44'E
- Paternoster, Western Cape, 32°49'S 17°53'E
- Papenkuilsfontein, Western Cape, 10 km west of Agulhas °'S °'E
- Pearly Beach, Western Cape, 34°39'S 19°29'E
- Platbank, Cape Peninsula, Western Cape, 34°20'5"S 18°29'09E
- Platboombaai, 34°20'20"S 18°27'08"E
- Plettenberg Bay, Western Cape, 34°03'S 023°22'E
- Ponta do Ouro, Mozambique border, 26°50'36"S 32°53'48"E
- Port Alfred, Eastern Cape, 33°36'15"S 26°54'12"E
- Port Edward, KwaZulu-Natal 31°03'S 30°13'E
- Port Elizabeth, Eastern Cape, 33°58'S 25°35'E
- Port Nolloth, Northern Cape, 22°15'S 16°52'E
- Port St. Johns, KwaZulu-Natal, 31°37'40"S 29°33'20"E
- Postberg, Western Cape, 33°07'S 18°00'E
- Protea Banks, KwaZulu-Natal, 30°50'S 30°28'E
- Rabbit Rock, KwaZulu-Natal, °'S °'E
- Robberg, Western Cape, 34°06'30"S 23°24'45"E
- Rocky Point, Namibia, °'S °'E
- Saldanha Bay, Western Cape, 33°01'S 17°59'E
- Saxon Reef, KwaZulu-Natal, (near Mozambique border), °'S °'E
- Scarborough, Cape Peninsula, Western Cape, 34°12'00"S 18°22'13"E
- Scottburgh, KwaZulu-Natal, 30°17′S 30°45′E
- Sea Point, Cape Peninsula, Western Cape, 33°55'19"S 18°22'37"E
- Shelly Beach, KwaZulu-Natal, KwaZulu-Natal, 30°48'S 30°25'E
- Simon's Town, Western Cape, 34°11'S 18°26'E
- Smitswinkel Bay, False Bay, Western Cape, 34°16'S 18°28'E
- Sodwana Bay, KwaZulu-Natal, 27°32'S 32°41'E
- Soetwater, °'S °'E
- Stilbaai (Still Bay), Western Cape, 34°22'S 21°25'E
- St Helena Bay, Western Cape, 32°43'S 18°06'E
- St. James, False Bay, Western Cape, 34°07'29"S 18°27'11"E
- St Lucia, KwaZulu-Natal, 28°23'03"S 32°25'46"E
- Strand, Western Cape, 34°07'S 18°49'E
- Strandfontein, False Bay, Western Cape, 34°05'22"S 18°33'18"E
- Strandfontein, Western Cape, 31°45'20"S 18°13'38"E
- Swakopmund, Namibia, 22°41'S 14°32'E
- Swartklip, False Bay, Western Cape, 34°04'30"S 18°41'10"E
- Swartkops River, 33°51'56"S 25°37'58"E
- Table Bay, Western Cape, 33°53'S 18°27'E
- Three Anchor Bay, Cape Peninsula, Western Cape, 33°54'22"S 19°23'51"E
- Three Sisters (Eastern Cape), Riet River, 10 km west of Port Alfred, Eastern Cape, °'S °'E
- Trafalgar, KwaZulu-Natal, 30°58'S 30°18'E
- Tsitsikamma, Eastern Cape, 34°01'18"S 22°53'44"E
- Umhlali, KwaZulu-Natal, (mHlali river mouth) 29°27'45"S 31°16'45"E
- Umpangazi, KwaZulu-Natal, (Cape Vidal?) 28°07'45"S 32°33'50"E
- Uvongo, KwaZulu-Natal, 30°49'S 30°23'E
- Waterloo Bay, Eastern Cape, 33°29'S 27°10'E
- Yzerfontein, Western Cape, 33°20'S 18°10'E
