= Griffithsia elegans =

Scientific classification
- Clade: Archaeplastida
- Division: Rhodophyta
- Class: Florideophyceae
- Order: Ceramiales
- Family: Wrangeliaceae
- Genus: Griffithsia
- Species: G. elegans

Binomial name
- Griffithsia elegans Baldock, 1976

Species of alga

Griffithsia elegans is a species of red algae in the family Wrangeliaceae. It is found in Australia and New Zealand. The type locality is Robe, South Australia.
