= Plumaria =

Plumaria may refer to:

- a synonym for Eriophorum, a plant genus
- Plumaria (alga), a red algae genus in the family Wrangeliaceae
- The pre-Hispanic artistic practice of using feathers in artwork, particularly headdresses in Latin America, most prominently Mexico (see Mexican featherwork)
