= Teges =

Teges may refer to:

- Teges, an individual from Tegea
- Teges, Clay County, Kentucky
- Griffithsia teges, a species in the alga genus Griffithsia
- Polysiphonia teges, a species in the alga genus Polysiphonia
- Teges Satriaji Cahyo Hutomo, an Indonesian badminton player; see Indonesian National Badminton Championships
