= Gymnothamnion =

Scientific classification
- Clade: Archaeplastida
- Division: Rhodophyta
- Class: Florideophyceae
- Order: Ceramiales
- Family: Wrangeliaceae
- Genus: Gymnothamnion; J.Agardh

Genus of algae

Gymnothamnion is a red alga genus in the family Wrangeliaceae.

== Species ==
- Gymnothamnion bipinnatum F.S.Collins & Hervey
- Gymnothamnion elegans (Schousboe ex C.Agardh) J.Agardh - type
  Gymnothamnion elegans var. bisporum Stegenga
- Gymnothamnion nigrescens (J.Agardh) Athanasiadis
- Gymnothamnion pteroton (Schousboe ex Bornet) Athanasiadis
