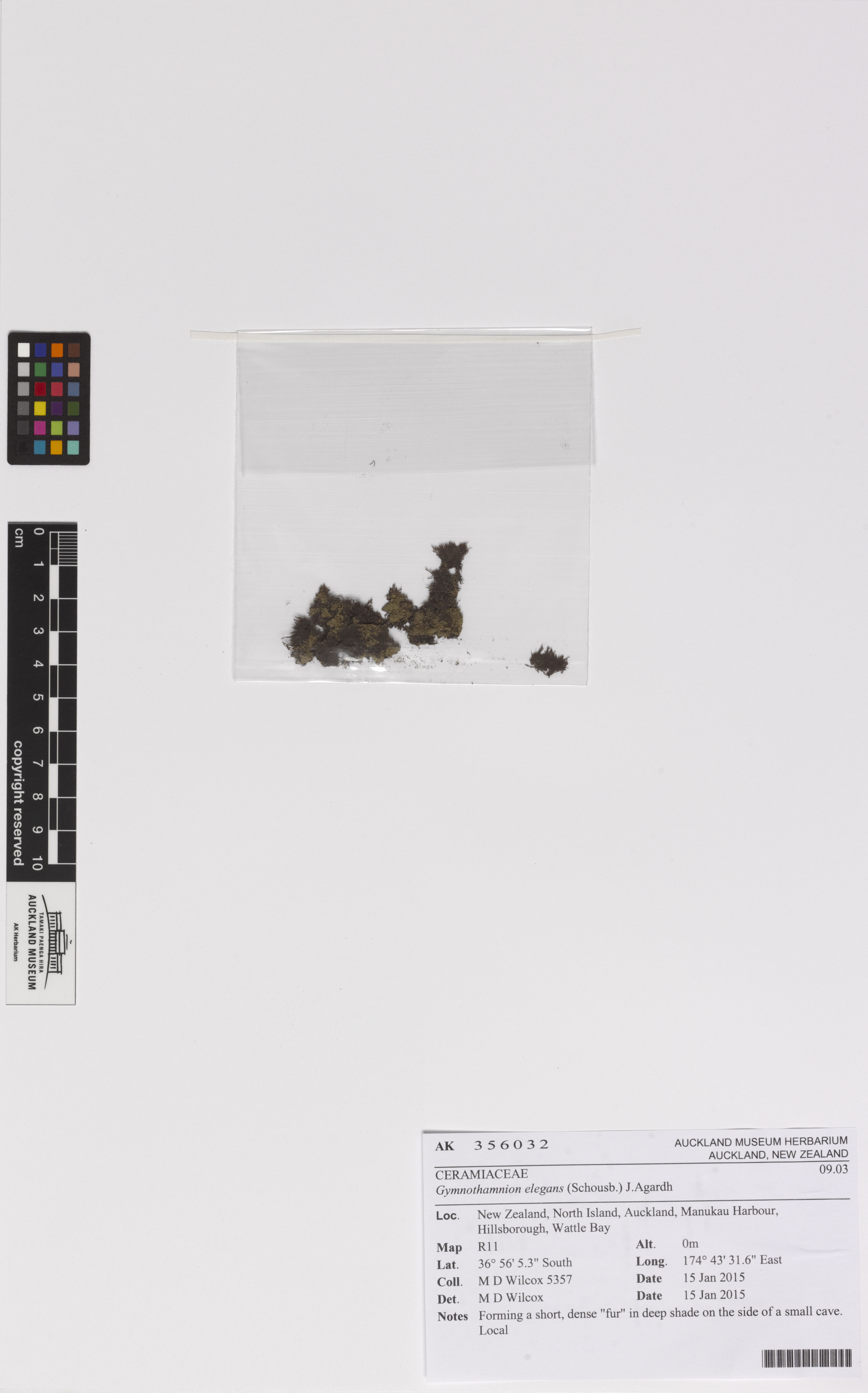

Scientific classification
- Clade: Archaeplastida
- Division: Rhodophyta
- Class: Florideophyceae
- Order: Ceramiales
- Family: Wrangeliaceae
- Genus: Gymnothamnion
- Species: G. elegans

Binomial name
- Gymnothamnion elegans (Schousboe ex C.Agardh) J.Agardh

Synonyms
- Callithamnion elegans Schousboe ex C.Agardh, 1828

= Gymnothamnion elegans =

Species of alga

Gymnothamnion elegans (syn. Callithamnion elegans Schousboe ex C.Agardh 1828) is a red alga species in the genus Gymnothamnion found in South Africa from Bakoven on Cape Peninsula to KwaZulu-Natal.

== Subspecies ==
- Gymnothamnion elegans var. bisporum Stegenga 1986, (Hout Bay to East London, endemic)

== See also ==
- List of seaweeds of South Africa
