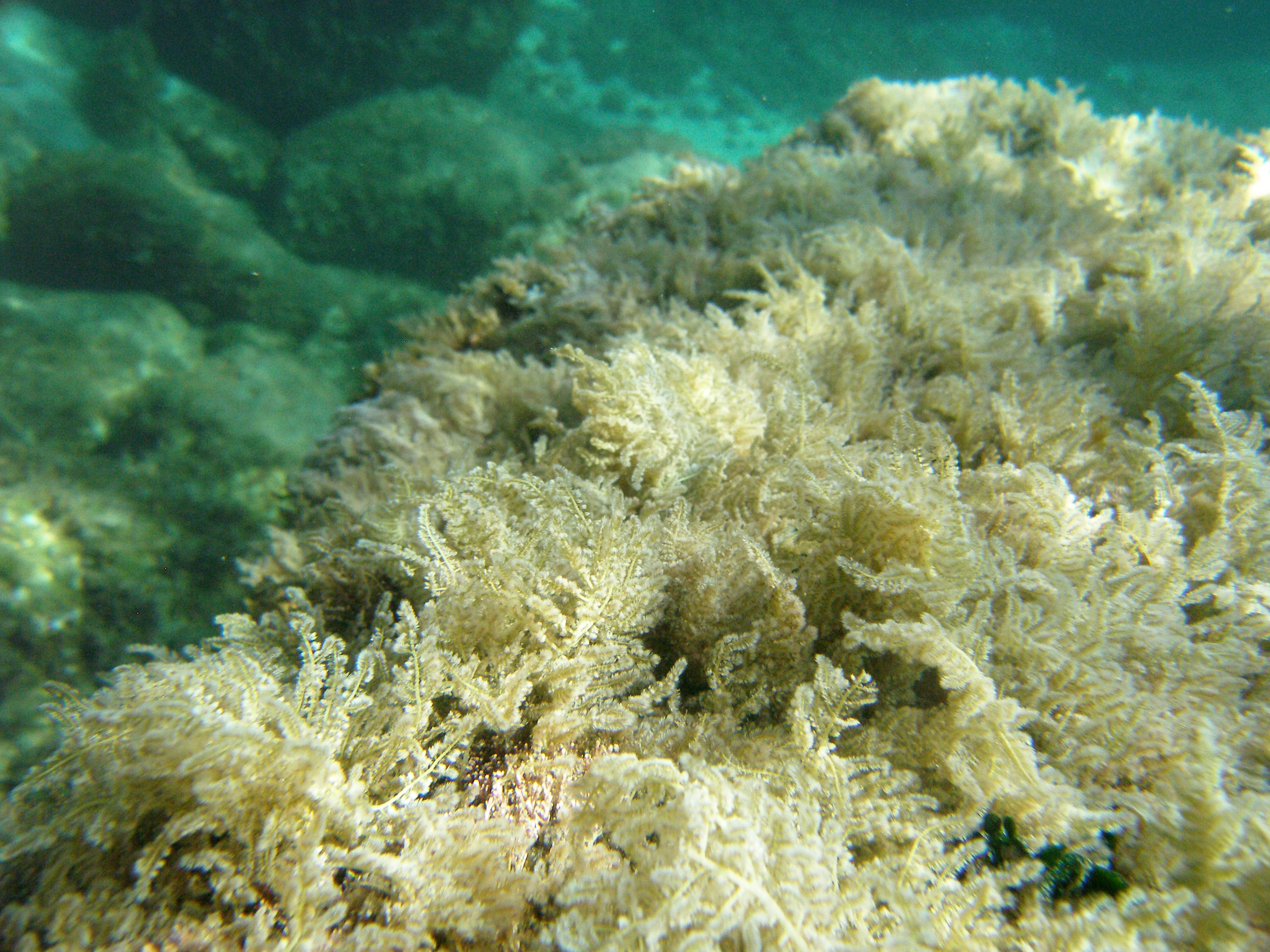
- Wrangelia penicillata

Scientific classification
- Domain: Eukaryota
- Clade: Archaeplastida
- Division: Rhodophyta
- Class: Florideophyceae
- Order: Ceramiales
- Family: Wrangeliaceae
- Genus: Wrangelia; C. Agardh, 1867

Type species
- Wrangelia penicillata J.Agardh, 1842

Species
- See text

Synonyms
- Bracebridgea J.Agardh, 1894 unaccepted Haliacantha J.Agardh, 1899

= Wrangelia =

Genus of algae

Wrangelia is a genus of red algae in the family Wrangeliaceae.

The genus was circumscribed by Carl Adolf Agardh in his book Species algarum rite cognitae, cum synonymis, differentiis specificis et descriptionibus succinctis. Voluminis secundi. Sectio prior. pp. [i]-lxxvi, [i]-189. in 1828.

The genus name of Wrangelia is in honour of Fredrik Anton von Wrangel (1786–1842), who was a Danish-Swedish Chamberlain, and also a botanist and alga specialist.

The type species, Wrangelia penicillata is also commonly called Pink bush alga. They form bushy plants, growing up to 20 cm (8 in) in height. They have small branches which travel outwards alternately from either side of the main branches in a single plane. They are light pink purple in colour. The species grows in shallow waters to moderate depths, while attached to nearly any hard substrate Generally, the species has 5 whorl branchlets per segment and a cortex that partially or wholly covers their axes.

== Distribution ==
The genus has almost cosmopolitan distribution. Such as Wrangelia penicillata can be found off the coast of Florida, the Bahamas and the Caribbean. As well as near Mauritius. It has also been found in the Mediterranean (off the coasts of Spain, France, Corsica, Italy, Sicily, Greece, Turkey, Israel and Libya) as well as in the Adriatic Sea. While Wrangelia gordoniae is found in the tropical western Atlantic Ocean. 5 species of Wrangelia are found near Australia. Species of Wrangelia are also found near Puerto Rico, and Brazil.

They can often be found growing on limestone (rock or soils) or be epiphytic on seagrass and seaweeds.

== Species ==
As accepted by WoRMS;

- Wrangelia abietina Harvey, 1855
- Wrangelia anastomosans Yamada, 1941
- Wrangelia argus (Montagne) Montagne, 1856
- Wrangelia australis (J.Agardh) E.M.Gordon, 1972
- Wrangelia balakrishnanii B.Subramanian, 1985
- Wrangelia bicuspidata Børgesen, 1916
- Wrangelia confluens J.Agardh
- Wrangelia dumontii (E.Y.Dawson) I.A.Abbott, 1979
- Wrangelia elegantissima R.E.Norris, 1994
- Wrangelia galeae Sonder, 1881
- Wrangelia globifera Meneghini
- Wrangelia gordoniae K.E.Bucher, D.L.Ballantine, C.Lozada-Troche & J.N.Norris, 2014
- Wrangelia hainanensis C.K.Tseng, 1942
- Wrangelia incurva J.Agardh
- Wrangelia nigrescens Meneghini
- Wrangelia nobilis J.D.Hooker & Harvey, 1847
- Wrangelia penicillata (C.Agardh) C.Agardh, 1828
- Wrangelia penicillta
- Wrangelia plebeja J.Agardh, 1852
- Wrangelia plumosa Harvey, 1844
- Wrangelia purpurifera J.Agardh, 1863
- Wrangelia sceptrifera J.Agardh, 1894
- Wrangelia sporigera Meneghini
- Wrangelia sundaralingamii B.Subramanian, 1985
- Wrangelia tagoi (Okamura) Okamura & Segawa, 1936
- Wrangelia tanegana Harvey, 1860
- Wrangelia tenuis Noda, 1964
- Wrangelia variabilis Derb. & Sol.
- Wrangelia velutina (Sonder) Harvey, 1855
- Wrangelia verticillata Kützing, 1847

== Other sources ==
- Dawes, C.J. and A.C. Mathieson (2008). Seaweeds of Florida. University Press of Florida (592 pp).
- Gray, Samuel Octavius, British Sea-Weeds: An Introduction to the Study of the Marine Algae of Great Britain, Ireland, and the Channel Islands, 1867
- Schneider, C. W. (2003). An annotated checklist and bibliography of the marine macroalgae of the Bermuda Islands. Nova Hedwigia, 76(3-4): 275-361
- Silva, P. C.; Basson, P. W.; Moe, R. L. (1996). Catalogue of the benthic marine algae of the Indian Ocean. University of California Publications in Botany. 79: 1-1259
