= Rhodothamniella =

Scientific classification
- Clade: Archaeplastida
- Division: Rhodophyta
- Class: Florideophyceae
- Order: Palmariales
- Family: Rhodothamniellaceae
- Genus: Rhodothamniella; Feldmann
- Species: R. floridula

Binomial name
- Rhodothamniella floridula (Dillwyn) Feldmann

Synonyms
- Conferva floridula Dillwyn; Audouinella floridula (Dillwyn) Woelkerling; Callithamnion floridulum (Dillwyn) Lyngbye; Ceramium floridulum (Dillwyn) Agardh; Chromastrum floridulum (Dillwyn) Papenfuss; Kylinia floridula (Dillwyn) Papenfuss; Rhodochorton floridulum (Dillwyn) Nägeli

Genus of algae

Rhodothamniella floridula is a small red seaweed detectable more easily with the feet than with the eyes. It thrives only where sand and rock occur together: anchored to the rock, it accumulates sand to form a slightly soft irregular carpet a centimetre or so in thickness. Although the surface is a dull red colour, in cross section the appearance is of a miniature sand dune with no visible algal component. Unable to stand significant desiccation, it prefers locations from the mid-shore downwards.

It is to be found on most suitable shorelines around Britain and northern Europe.

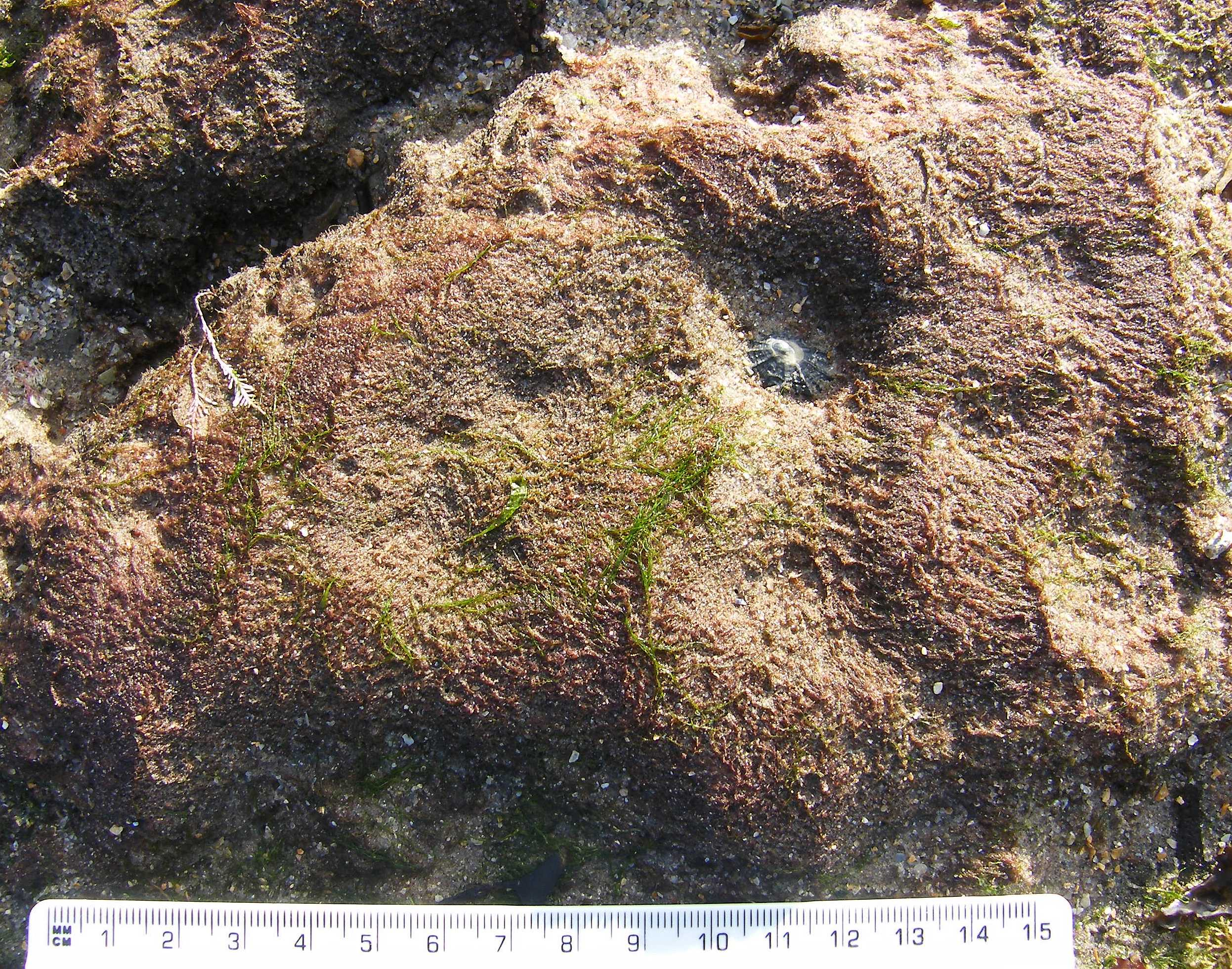
Picture of Rhodothamniella

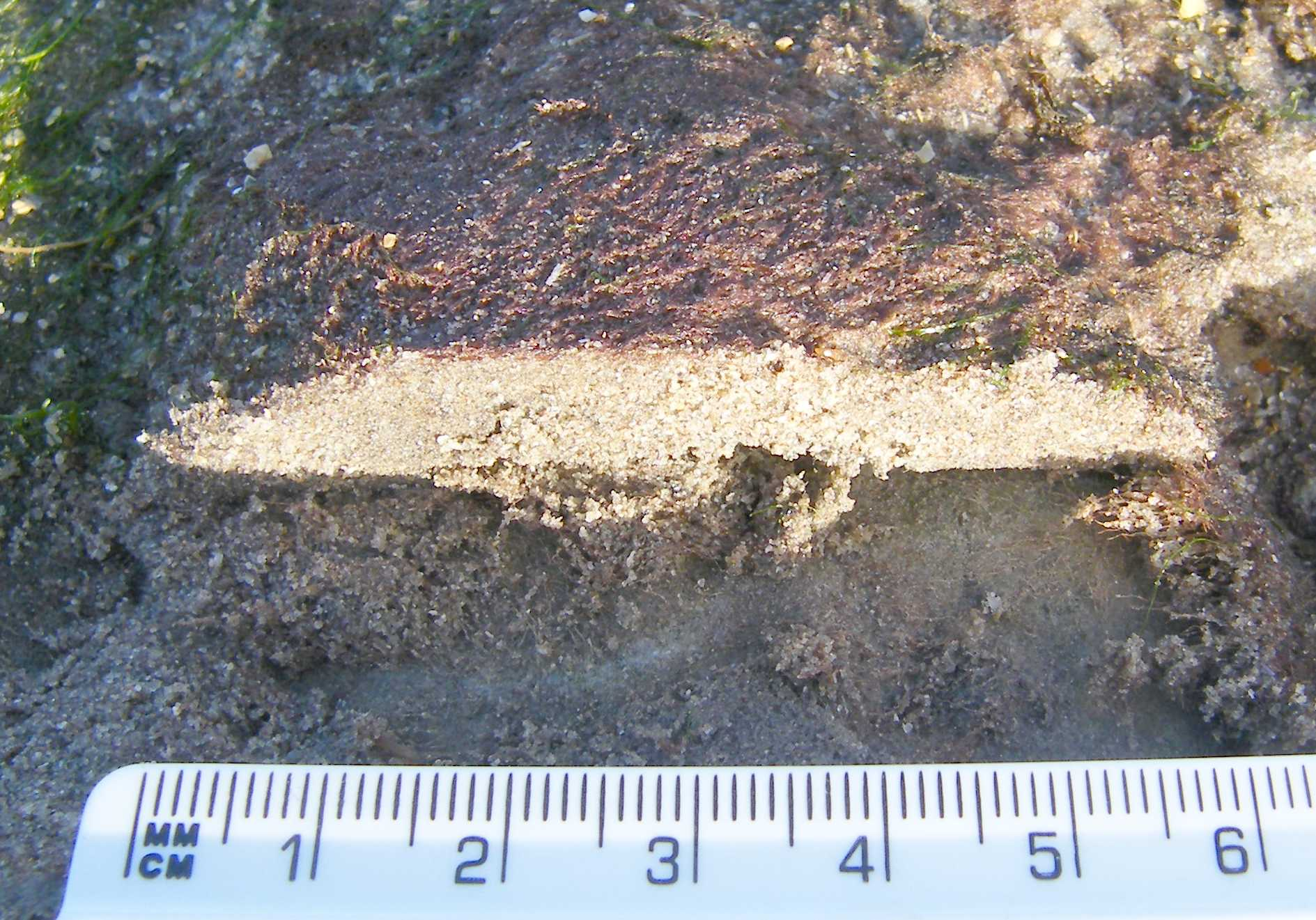
Picture of Rhodothamniella
