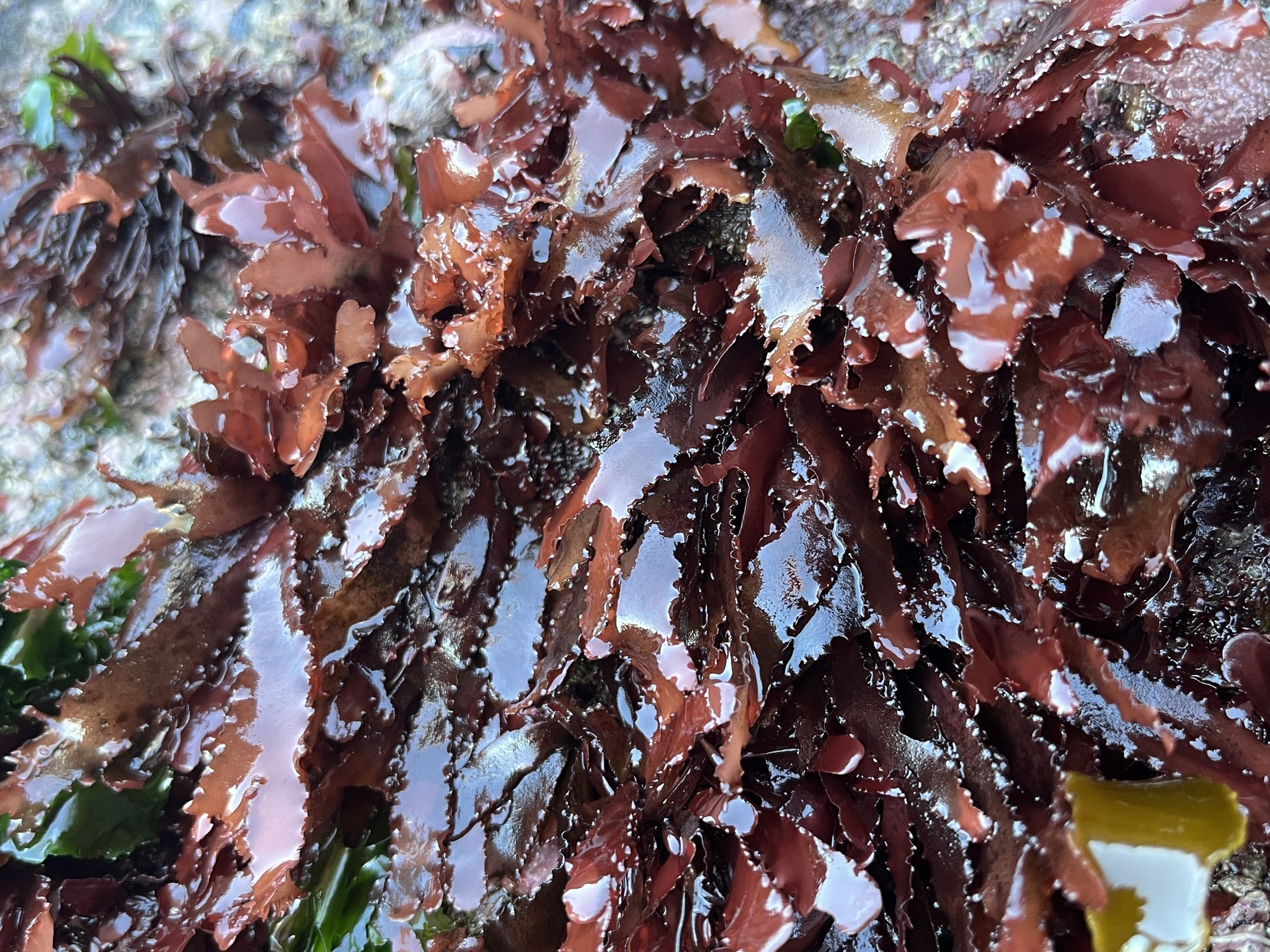

Scientific classification
- Domain: Eukaryota
- Clade: Archaeplastida
- Division: Rhodophyta
- Class: Florideophyceae
- Order: Gigartinales
- Family: Phyllophoraceae
- Genus: Schottera
- Species: S. nicaeensis

Binomial name
- Schottera nicaeensis (J.V.Lamouroux ex Duby) Guiry & Hollenberg

= Schottera nicaeensis =

Species of alga

Schottera nicaeensis is a species of red algae (Rhodophyta) similar to other small red algae particularly Phyllophora.

== Description ==
The thallus consists of short flat fronds rising from a prostrate terete branched holdfast and growing to a length of about 10 cm. It branches once or twice and bears terete proliferations at the tips.

== Distribution ==
In Ireland, S. nicaeensis occurs in Portmuck, in Island Magee. On the western shores of Great Britain, Portugal and in the Mediterranean.
