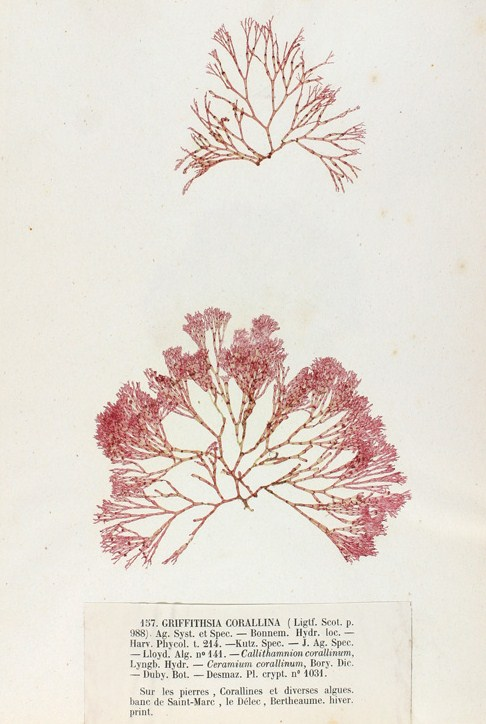
- « Griffithsia corallina » = Griffithsia corallinoides - Illustration in Alguier des frères Crouan, Université de Bourgogne, 1852

Scientific classification
- Domain: Eukaryota
- Clade: Archaeplastida
- Division: Rhodophyta
- Class: Florideophyceae
- Order: Ceramiales
- Family: Wrangeliaceae
- Genus: Griffithsia; C. Agardh, 1817, nom. cons.

Species
- See text

Synonyms
- Heterosphondylium Nägeli, 1862; Pandorea J.Agardh, 1876, nom. illeg. (later homonym of Pandorea Spach 1840, Bignoniaceae); Polychroma Bonnemaison, 1822, nom. illeg.

= Griffithsia =

Genus of algae

Griffithsia is a genus of red algae in the family Wrangeliaceae.

Carl Adolph Agardh named Griffithsia in the honour of phycologist Amelia Griffiths (1768–1858).

Griffithsin is a protein isolated from species of Griffithsia.

== Species ==
Griffithsia aestivana - Griffithsia antarctica - Griffithsia balara - Griffithsia capitata - Griffithsia caribaea - Griffithsia caudata - Griffithsia chilensis - Griffithsia coacta - Griffithsia confervoides - Griffithsia corallinoides - Griffithsia crassiuscula - Griffithsia devoniensis - Griffithsia elegans - Griffithsia genovefae - Griffithsia globulifera - Griffithsia grandis - Griffithsia gunniana - Griffithsia heteroclada - Griffithsia heteromorpha - Griffithsia intertexta - Griffithsia intricata - Griffithsia japonica - Griffithsia metcalfii - Griffithsia monilis - Griffithsia myriophyllum - Griffithsia okiensis - Griffithsia opuntioides - Griffithsia ovalis - Griffithsia pacifica - Griffithsia phyllamphora - Griffithsia pilalyea - Griffithsia pulvinata - Griffithsia radicans - Griffithsia redicata - Griffithsia rhizophora - Griffithsia schousboei - Griffithsia secundiramea - Griffithsia subcylindrica - Griffithsia teges - Griffithsia tingitana - Griffithsia tomo-yamadae - Griffithsia torulosa - Griffithsia traversii - Griffithsia venusta - Griffithsia weber-van-bosseae
