= Wrangeliaceae =

Scientific classification
- Clade: Archaeplastida
- Division: Rhodophyta
- Class: Florideophyceae
- Order: Ceramiales
- Family: Wrangeliaceae; J. Agardh

Family of algae

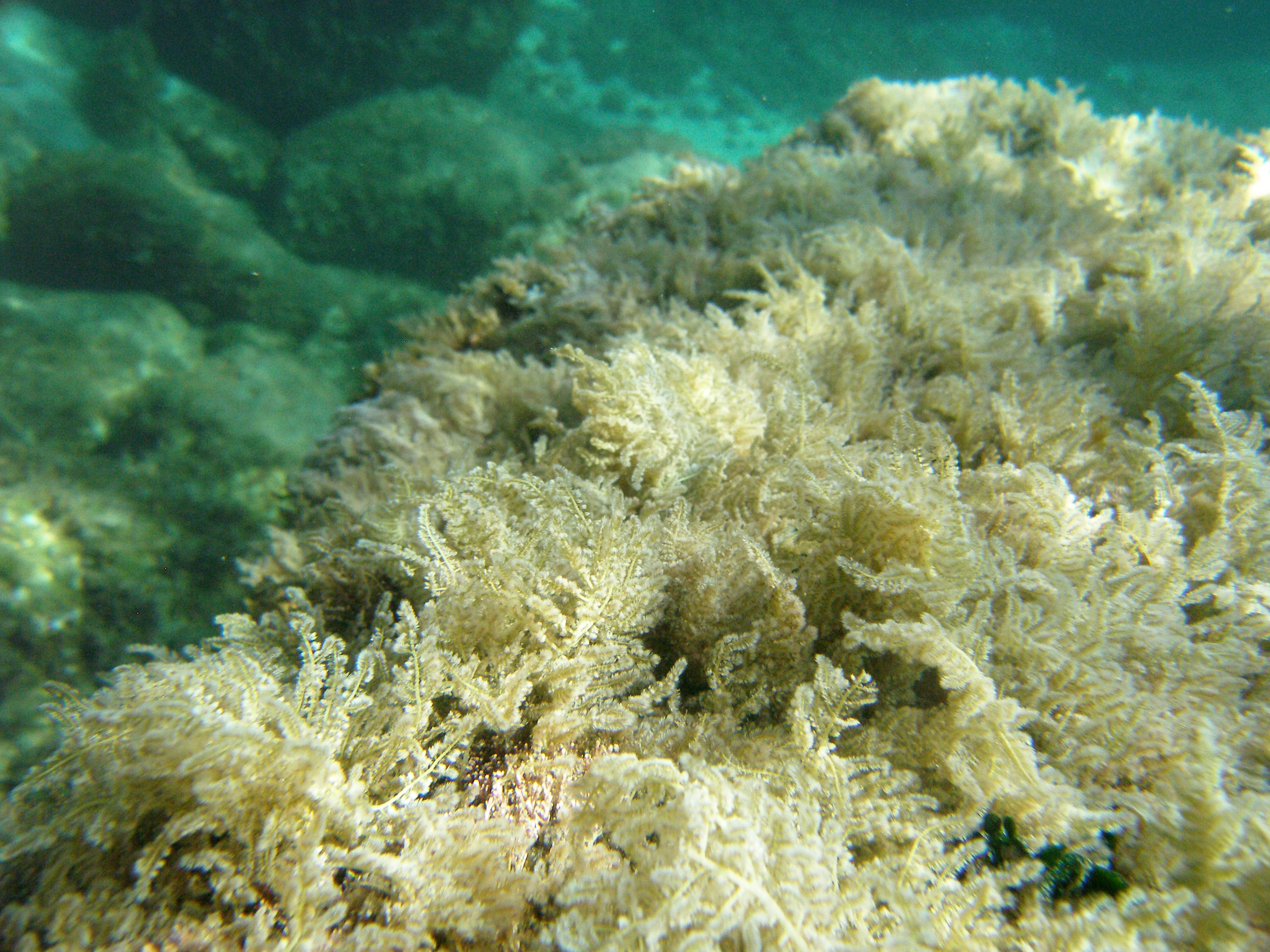
Wrangelia penicillata at 2m depth.

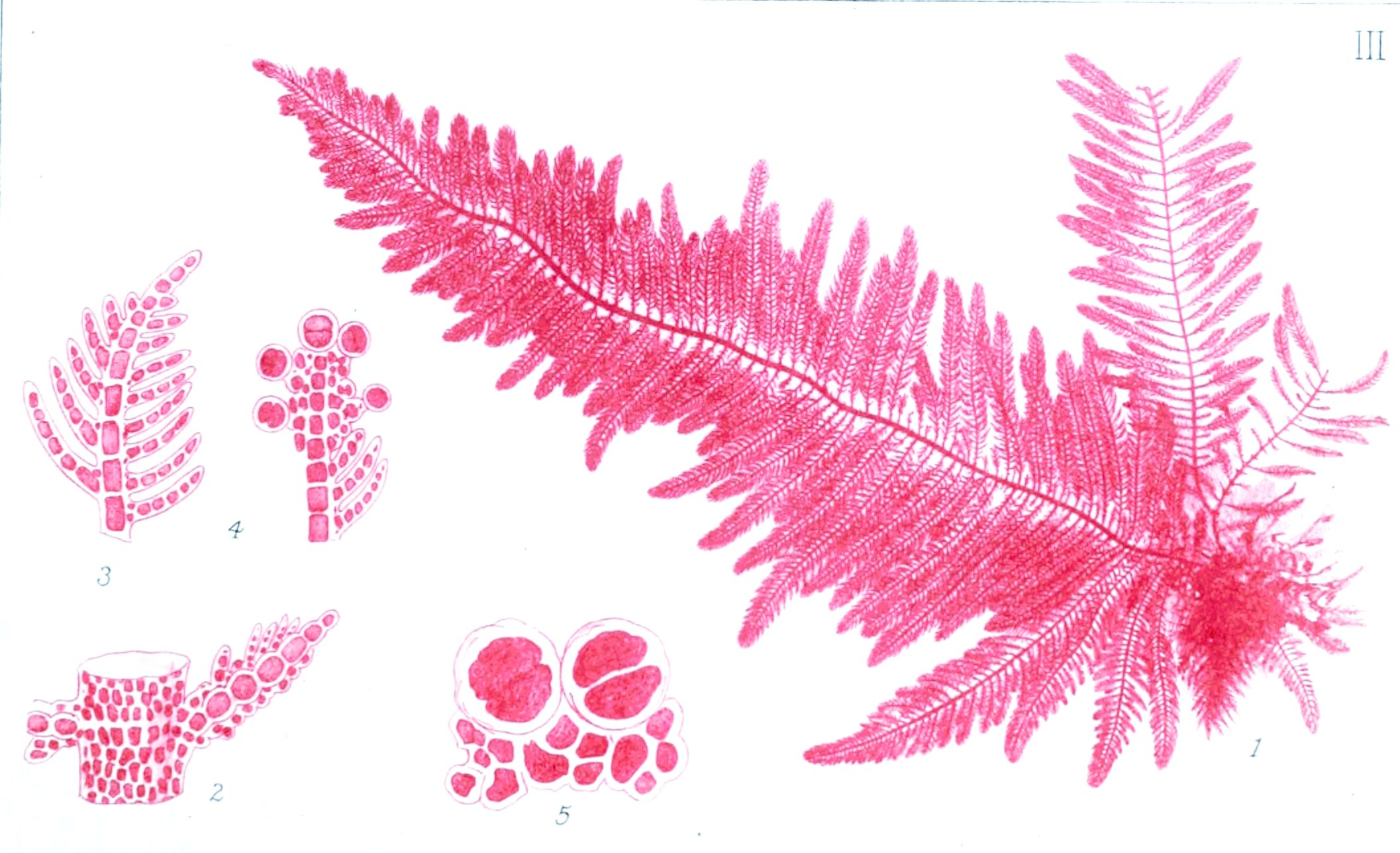
Ptilota eatoni Dickie, now Plumariopsis eatonii (Dickie) De Toni 1 partial frond, 2 section of stem with young branch, 3 tip of full-grown branch, 4 branch tip with sphaerospores, 5 sphaerospores.

Wrangeliaceae is a red alga family in the order Ceramiales. It was published by J.Agardh in 1851 (originally as 'Wrangelieae') in his book Species, genera et ordines algarum : seu descriptiones succinctae specierum.

== Genera ==
As accepted by Algaebase; (with approx. no of species per genera)

- Subfamilia Compsothamnioideae De Toni (21)
- Tribus Compsothamnieae F.Schmitz & Hauptfleisch (17)
  - Antarcticothamnion R.L.Moe & P.C.Silva (1)
  - Compsothamnion (Nägeli) F.Schmitz (4)
  - Dasythamniella P.C.Silva (5)
  - Gymnophycus Huisman & Kraft (3)
  - Mortensenia Weber Bosse (1)
  - Rhododictyon W.R.Taylor (1)
  - Scagelonema R.E.Norris & M.J.Wynne (1)
  - Spencerella Darbishire (1)
  - Lasiothalieae H.B.S.Womersley (1)
    - Lasiothalia Harvey (1)
  - Radiathamnieae Gordon-Mills & Kraft (3)
    - Laurenciophila Stegenga (1)
    - Ochmapexus Womersley (1)
- Subfamilia Spongoclonioideae De Toni (42)
  - Spongoclonieae F.Schmitz & Hauptfleisch (42)
    - Lophothamnion J.Agardh (1)
    - Pleonosporium Nägeli (31)
    - Spongoclonium Sonder (10)
- Tribus Dasyphileae F.Schmitz & Hauptfleisch (5)
  - Dasyphila Sonder (4)
  - Muellerena F.Schmitz (1)
- Tribus Griffithsieae Schmitz & Hauptfleisch (64)
  - Anotrichium Nägeli (14)
  - Baldockia A.J.K.Millar (1)
  - Bornetia Thuret (5)
  - Griffithsia C.Agardh (42)
  - Halurus Kützing (2)
  - Vickersia Karsakoff (1)
- Tribus Halosieae M.Cormaci & G.Furnari (1)
  - Halosia Cormaci & G.Furnari (1)
- Tribus Lejolisieae Feldmann-Mazoyer (20)
  - Lejolisia Bornet (7)
  - Ptilothamnion Thuret (13)
- Tribus Monosporeae F.Schmitz & Hauptfleisch (17)
  - Anisoschizus Huisman & Kraft (1)
  - Desikacharyella B.Subramanian (2)
  - Deucalion Huisman & Kraft (1)
  - Guiryella Huisman & Kraft (1)
  - Mazoyerella Gordon-Mills & Womersley (4)
  - Monosporus Solier (5)
  - Tanakaella Itono (3)
- Tribus Ptiloteae F.Schmitz & Hauptfleisch (25)
  - Boreothamnion M.J.Wynne (1)
  - Dasyptilon G.Feldmann (3)
  - Plumaria F.Schmitz (1)
  - Plumariopsis De Toni (2)
  - Ptilota C.Agardh (14)
  - Tokidaea Yoshida (4)
- Tribus Spermothamnieae F.Schmitz & Hauptfleisch (38)
  - Gordoniella Itono (1)
  - Hommersandiella Alongi, Cormaci & G.Furnari (1)
  - Interthamnion E.M.Gordon (1)
  - Lomathamnion E.M.Gordon (1)
  - Ptilothamnionopsis P.S.Dixon (1)
  - Rhipidothamnion Huisman (1)
  - Spermothamnion Areschoug (17)
  - Stegengaea Alongi, Cormaci & G.Furnari (1)
  - Tiffaniella Doty & Meñez (12)
  - Woelkerlingia Alongi, Cormaci & G.Furnari (2)
- Tribus Sphondylothamnieae Feldmann-Mazoyer (22)
  - Diplothamnion A.B.Joly & Yamaguishi (3)
  - Grallatoria M.Howe (2)
  - Involucrana Baldock & Womersley (2)
  - Medeiothamnion Pujals (6)
  - Shepleya E.M.Gordon (5)
  - Sphondylothamnion Nägeli (1)
  - Wollastoniella E.M.Gordon (2)
- Tribus Wrangelieae Schmitz & Hauptfleisch (27)
  - Plumariella Okamura (2)
  - Wrangelia C.Agardh (25)
