= Nereoginkgo populifolia =

Scientific classification
- Clade: Archaeplastida
- Division: Rhodophyta
- Class: Florideophyceae
- Order: Gigartinales
- Family: Kallymeniaceae
- Genus: Nereoginkgo
- Species: N. populifolia

Binomial name
- Nereoginkgo populifolia Hommersand et al., 2009

Species of alga

Nereoginkgo populifolia is a species of Antarctic marine red alga.
