= Kallymenia ercegovicii =

Scientific classification
- Clade: Archaeplastida
- Division: Rhodophyta
- Class: Florideophyceae
- Order: Gigartinales
- Family: Kallymeniaceae
- Genus: Kallymenia
- Species: K. ercegovicii

Binomial name
- Kallymenia ercegovicii Vergés et al., 2014

Species of alga

Kallymenia ercegovicii a red algae species first discovered in the Mediterranean Sea, in the coast of Croatia.

== Description ==
This species is distinguished from other Kallymenia species by a deeply lobed thallus, its large inner cortical cells, stellate but non-ganglionic medullary cells and non-ostiolate cystocarps which are surrounded by a filamentous net, itself composed of elongated cells forming fascicles.
