= Varimenia macropustulosa =

Scientific classification
- Domain: Eukaryota
- Clade: Archaeplastida
- Division: Rhodophyta
- Class: Florideophyceae
- Order: Gigartinales
- Family: Kallymeniaceae
- Genus: Varimenia
- Species: V. macropustulosa

Binomial name
- Varimenia macropustulosa Hommersand et al., 2009

Species of alga

Varimenia macropustulosa is a species of Antarctic marine red alga.
