= Leniea lubrica =

Scientific classification
- Clade: Archaeplastida
- Division: Rhodophyta
- Class: Florideophyceae
- Order: Gigartinales
- Family: Kallymeniaceae
- Genus: Leniea
- Species: L. lubrica

Binomial name
- Leniea lubrica R.L. Moe, 2009

Species of alga

Leniea lubrica is a species of Antarctic marine red alga.
