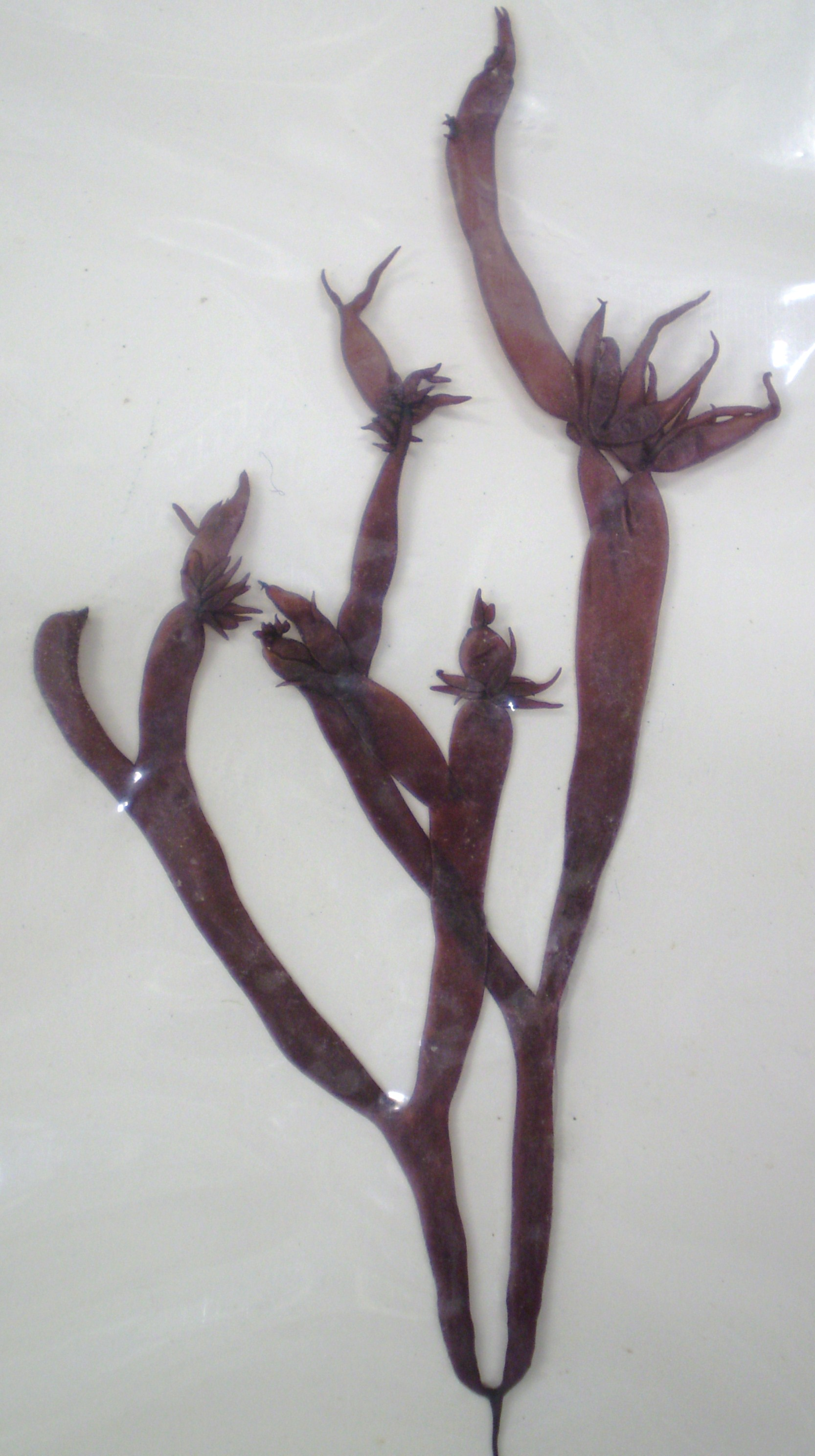

Scientific classification
- Clade: Archaeplastida
- Division: Rhodophyta
- Class: Florideophyceae
- Order: Gigartinales
- Family: Endocladiaceae
- Genus: Gloiopeltis
- Species: G. furcata

Binomial name
- Gloiopeltis furcata (Postels & Ruprecht) J. Agardh 1851

Synonyms
- Dumontia furcata

= Gloiopeltis furcata =

Glueweed

Species of alga

Gloiopeltis furcata, commonly known as glueweed, jelly moss and fukuro-funori (Japan), is a marine alga that is widely distributed in the North Pacific Ocean, along the shorelines of China, Taiwan, Korea, Japan, and the Pacific shores of Russia; and from the Aleutian Islands south to Baja California. G. furcata has long been utilized as a food source in Asia, where it is also used as a sizing material in silk and other textiles. G. furcata is also a raw material for textile binders. Studies show that extracts of G. furcata inhibit the growth of several human cancer cell lines, and can significantly lower blood glucose levels.

G. furcata's thallus is reddish brown to golden yellow, up to 5 cm (2 in) tall. The plant appears black when dry. The cylindrical branches are smooth. The basal crust is perennial, and produces a new crop of branches every year.

Gloiopeltis furcata inhabits the mid to high intertidal zone of rocky coasts where it grows abundantly, on the tops and sides of rocks and rocky ledges. G. furcata is very similar to Gloiopeltis tenax and Gloiopeltis complanata. The three species are grown, harvested, and often used interchangeably. G. furcata is commercially harvested in China and Japan.

== See also ==
- Endocladia muricata (sea moss) may appear similar, and also grows in the high intertidal zone.
