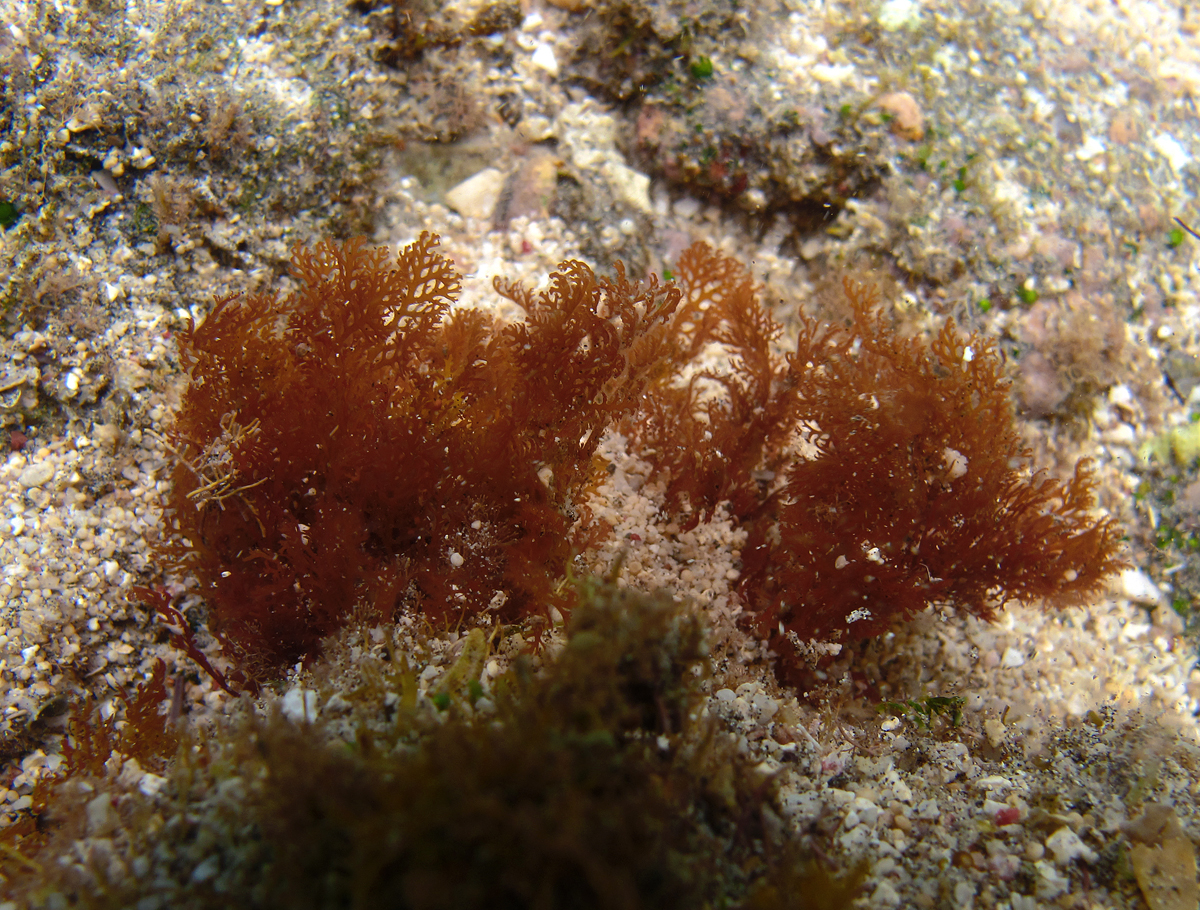
- Portieria hornemannii

Scientific classification
- Domain: Eukaryota
- Clade: Archaeplastida
- Division: Rhodophyta
- Class: Florideophyceae
- Order: Gigartinales
- Family: Rhizophyllidaceae
- Genus: Portieria
- Species: P. hornemannii

Binomial name
- Portieria hornemannii (Lyngbye) P.C.Silva

Synonyms
- Desmia hornemannii Lyngbye, 1819

= Portieria hornemannii =

Species of alga

Portieria hornemannii is a species of red algae in the family Rhizophyllidaceae. The chemical halomon was discovered in this species.
