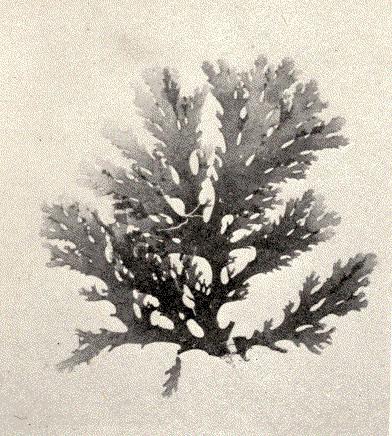

Scientific classification
- Clade: Archaeplastida
- Division: Rhodophyta
- Class: Florideophyceae
- Order: Gigartinales
- Family: Kallymeniaceae
- Genus: Callophyllis
- Species: C. variegata

Binomial name
- Callophyllis variegata (Bory de Saint-Vincent) Kützing

= Callophyllis variegata =

Species of seaweed

Callophyllis variegata, commonly known as carola, is a type of edible seaweed, a member of the genus Callophyllis. Callophyllis variegata occurs in Concepción de Chile and other parts of South America such as Peru, the Falkland Islands, Tierra del Fuego. But also in New Guinea, South Africa, Australia, New Zealand, Alaska, St. Paul Island (Indian Ocean), Antarctic and subantarctic islands such as the Graham Land, Kerguelen, Macquarie Island, South Georgia, and the South Orkney Islands.
