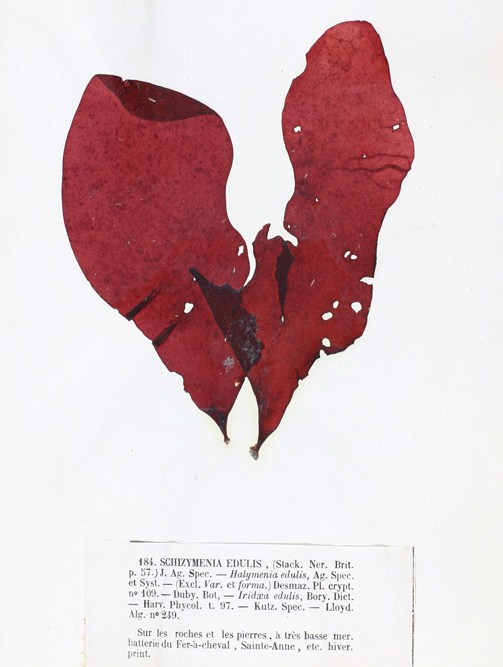

Scientific classification
- Clade: Archaeplastida
- Division: Rhodophyta
- Class: Florideophyceae
- Order: Gigartinales
- Family: Dumontiaceae
- Genus: Dilsea
- Species: D. carnosa

Binomial name
- Dilsea carnosa (Schmidel) Kuntze (1898)

Synonyms
- Fucus carnosus Schmidel (1794); Fucus edulis Stackhouse (1801); Dilsea edulis Stackhouse (1809); Ulva edulis (Stackhouse) Lyngbye (1819); Halymenia edulis (Stackhouse) C.Agardh (1822); Iridaea edulis (Stackhouse) Bory de Saint-Vincent (1830); Schizymenia edulis (Stackhouse) Kleen (1874); Sarcophyllis edulis (Stackhouse) J.Agardh (1876)

= Dilsea carnosa =

Species of alga

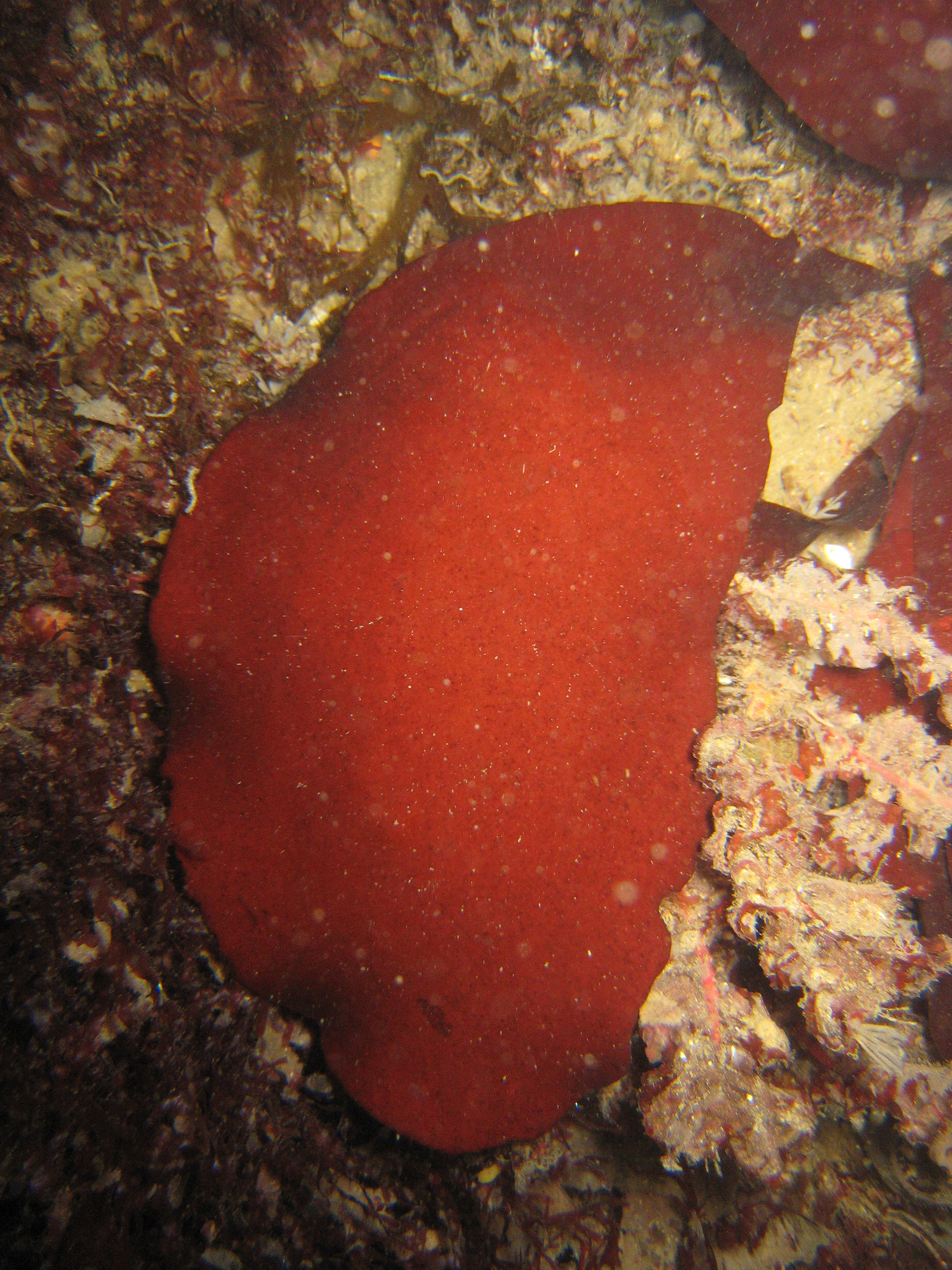
Dilsea carnosa, in Carantec

Dilsea carnosa, commonly known as the poor man's weather glass or the sea belt, is a species of red algae in the Dumontiaceae family of the order Gigartinales.

== Taxonomy ==
The species was first described scientifically by Schmidel in 1794, under the name Fucus carnosus. The German botanist Otto Kuntze transferred the species to Dilsea in 1898.

== Description ==
This large alga is dark red, flattened and somewhat leathery. It may be 30 cm or more long and 15 cm wide. It is usually not branched but may split. It grows from a small discoid base. The mature blade has a compact medulla enclosed within a cortex of rounded cells inwards and outwards of close radial filaments of about 6 cells. It grows from a discoid holdfast with a short stipe.

== Habitat ==
Attached to rock in the lower littoral, to a depth of 24 m or more. It grows from a discoid holdfast with a short stipe.

== Reproduction ==
The gametangial plants are dioecious, with male and female gametangia on separate plants. The spermatangia, male gametes, occur in patches near the edges of the fronds. Carposporangia release spores. Tetraspores occur near the margins and consist of four spores.

== Distribution ==
Generally distributed around the British Isles including the Shetland Isles and Isle of Man; from Portugal to Arctic Russia.
