= Hypnea cervicornis =

Scientific classification
- Clade: Archaeplastida
- Division: Rhodophyta
- Class: Florideophyceae
- Order: Gigartinales
- Family: Cystocloniaceae
- Genus: Hypnea
- Species: H. cervicornis

Binomial name
- Hypnea cervicornis J.Agardh, 1851

Species of red algae

Hypnea cervicornis is a species of marine red algae found in warm waters worldwide.
