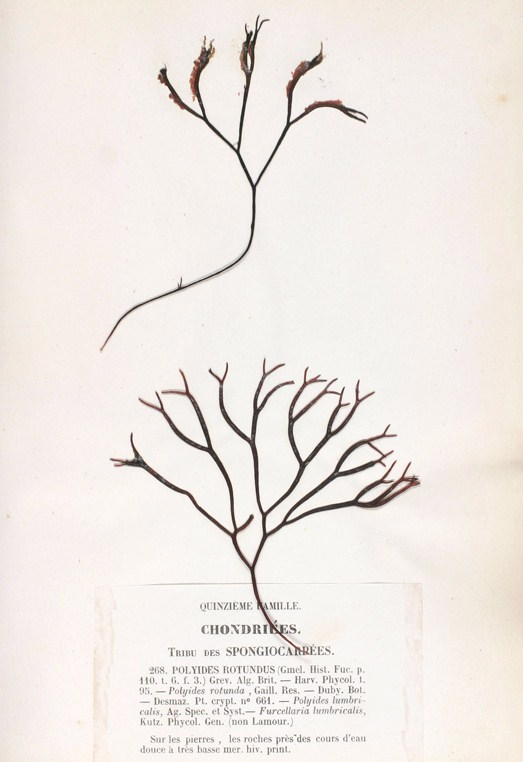

Scientific classification
- Domain: Eukaryota
- Clade: Archaeplastida
- Division: Rhodophyta
- Class: Florideophyceae
- Order: Gigartinales
- Family: Polyidaceae
- Genus: Polyides
- Species: P. rotunda

Binomial name
- Polyides rotunda C. A. Agardh (1822)

= Polyides rotunda =

Species of alga

Polyides rotunda is a species of small red marine alga in the family Polyidaceae.

== Description ==
Polyides rotunda grows to 20 cm (7.9 in) in length, its cartilaginous, terete and branches two or three times dichotomously. The branches are about 2 mm (0.079 in) in diameter reaching a uniform height. The holdfast is disc like. In colour it is purplish red.

They are exclusively multicellular, like all Polyidaceae.

== Habitat ==
Generally epilithic in rock pools in the littoral and upper sublittoral. Sand tolerant.

== Distribution ==
Generally distributed around Ireland, Great Britain, the Isle of Man and the Channel Islands.

== Reproduction ==
Polyides rotunda is dioecious. The spermatangial cells develop in swollen areas near the apices. Cystocarps develop near the apices. The tetrasporangia are cruciate, that is cross-shaped.

== Similar species ==
Furcellaria lumbricalis (Hudson) Lamouroux is very similar but can be distinguished by the holdfast which has claw-like branches while that of Polyides being disc-like.
