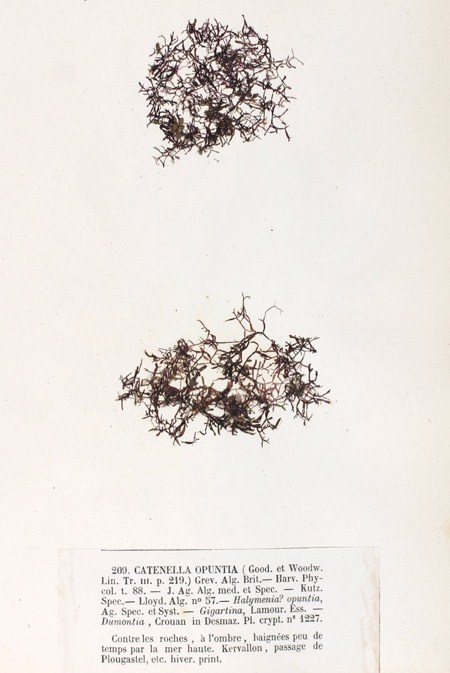

Scientific classification
- Clade: Archaeplastida
- Division: Rhodophyta
- Class: Florideophyceae
- Order: Gigartinales
- Family: Caulacanthaceae
- Genus: Catenella
- Species: C. caespitosa

Binomial name
- Catenella caespitosa (Withering) L.M.Irvine

= Catenella caespitosa =

Species of alga

Catenella caespitosa is a small red marine alga.

== Description ==
This small alga grows to 20 mm high from a discoid holdfast and dark brown in colour. Very irregularly branched, creeping moss-like and terete. Branches easily seen to be constricted at intervals. Medulla, the inner cells, formed of thick-walled filaments and with a cortex of rows of elongated cells radially arranged compact cells.

== Habitat, ecology ==
Catanella caespitosa occurs in shaded sites on rock and around the holdfasts of the fucoids of the upper littoral.

== Distribution ==
Recorded around the British Isles, from Norway to the Mediterranean and further from the Indian and Pacific Oceans.

== Reproduction ==
The alga is monoecious, that is both male and female parts to be found on the same plant. The spermatangia, the male gametes, and carposporophytes, the diploid phase, grouped together in sori. Tetrasporangia occur scattered towards the tips of the filaments of separate plants.
