= Hypnea chordacea =

Scientific classification
- Clade: Archaeplastida
- Division: Rhodophyta
- Class: Florideophyceae
- Order: Gigartinales
- Family: Cystocloniaceae
- Genus: Hypnea
- Species: H. chordacea

Binomial name
- Hypnea chordacea Kützing, 1847

Species of red algae

Hypnea chordacea is a species of marine red algae found in the Indo-Pacific including Hawaiʻi. It serves as an important food source for various marine organisms.

== Description ==
Hypnea chordacea can grow up to 8 cm (3.1 in) tall. Hypnea chordacea has a textured surface that can appear soft and spongy. Its color is typically green, but can also appear reddish-brown in deeper waters.

== Distribution and habitat ==
It is mostly common on rocks in the intertidal and shallow subtidal areas of the ocean as a turf-forming species found in the tropical Indo-Pacific including Hawaii.
