= Dumontia =

Dumontia may refer to:

- Dumontia (alga), a genus of algae in the family Dumontiaceae
- Dumontia (crustacean), a genus of crustaceans in the family Dumontiidae
