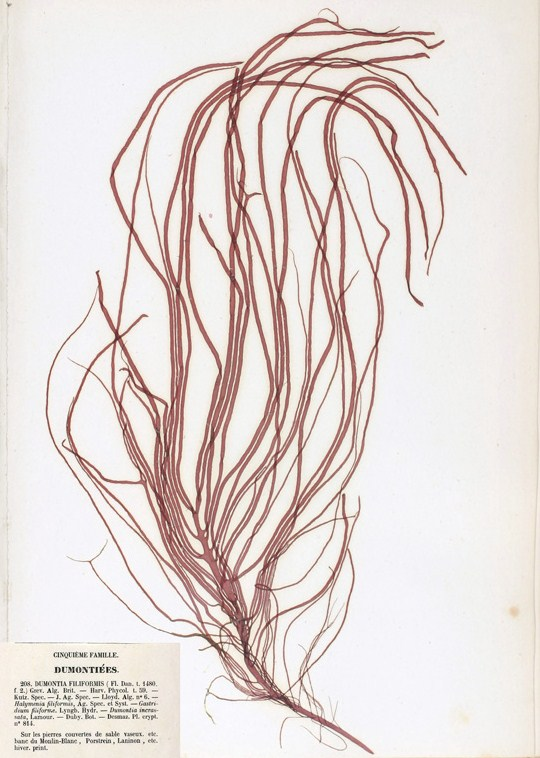

Scientific classification
- Domain: Eukaryota
- Clade: Archaeplastida
- Division: Rhodophyta
- Class: Florideophyceae
- Order: Gigartinales
- Family: Dumontiaceae
- Genus: Dumontia
- Species: D. contorta

Binomial name
- Dumontia contorta (S.G. Gmelin) Ruprecht

= Dumontia contorta =

Species of algae

Dumontia contorta is a relatively small epiphytic algae of the sea-shore.

== Description ==
The thallus grows from a discoid holdfast to a length of about 23 centimetres (9.1 in). The fronds branch irregularly and sparingly. The branches are hollow, soft and twisted, dark reddish brown in colour which bleach towards the tips, they clearly taper at their junction.

== Reproduction ==
The plants are dioecious (sexes separate) with microscopic spermatangia, carposporangia, and tetrasporangia developing in the surface layer, cruciate.

== Habitat ==
Generally epilithic in rock pools of the littoral zone.

== Distribution ==
Common around the British Isles. Europe from Russia to Portugal and Canada to United States. In the NW Pacific and Alaska.
