= Michael Jung =

Michael Jung may refer to:

- Michael Jung (equestrian) (born 1982), German equestrian
- Michael E. Jung (born 1947), Professor of Chemistry at the University of California
