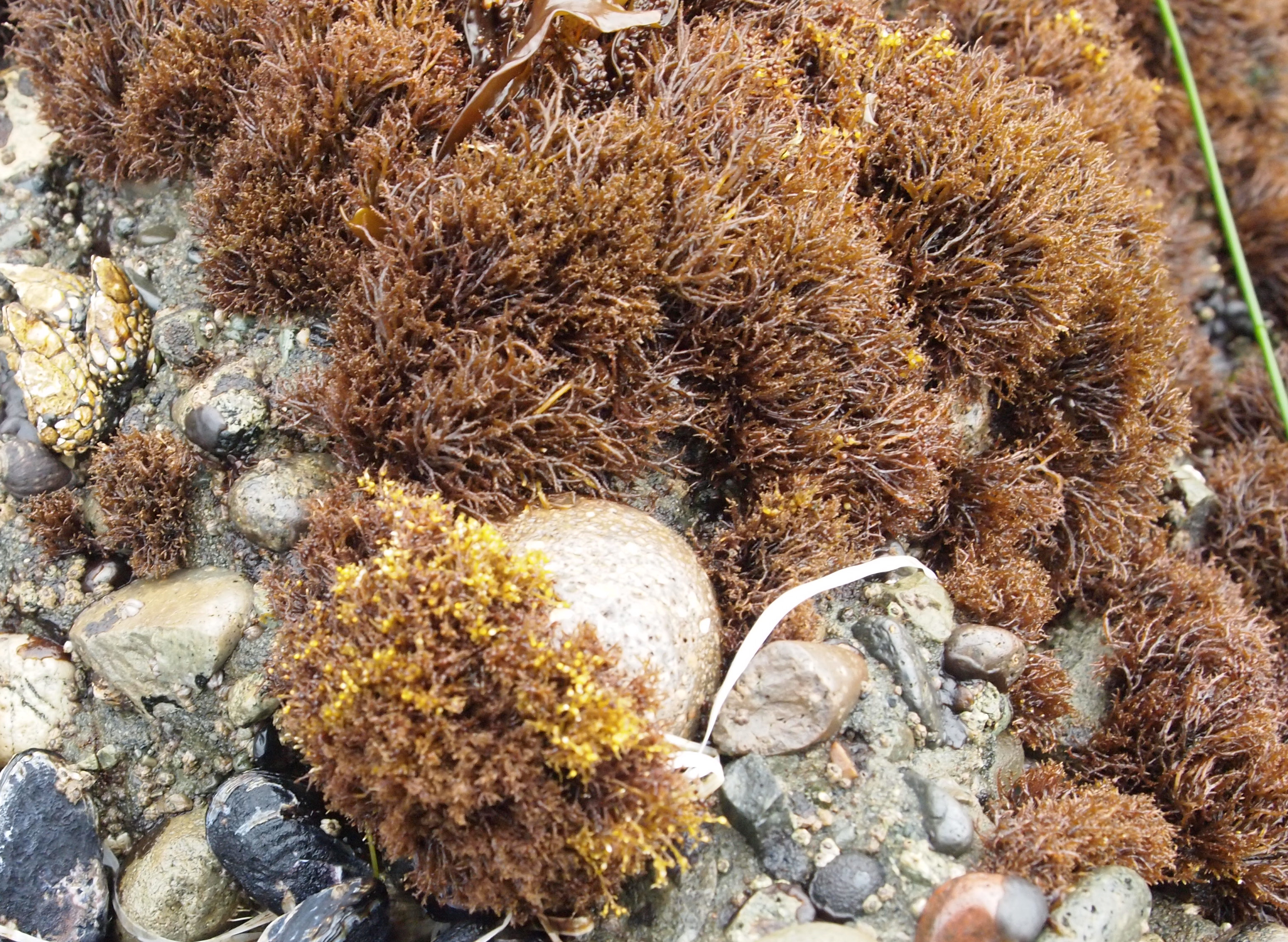
- Endocladia muricata

Scientific classification
- Clade: Archaeplastida
- Division: Rhodophyta
- Class: Florideophyceae
- Order: Gigartinales
- Family: Endocladiaceae
- Genus: Endocladia; J.Agardh, 1841

= Endocladia =

Genus of algae

Endocladia is a genus of red algae belonging to the family Endocladiaceae.

The species of this genus are found in Northern America.

Species:

- Endocladia muricata (Endlichter) J.Agardh
- Endocladia vagans (Borgesen) Taylor
- Endocladia vernicata J.G.Agardh
- Endocladia viridis
