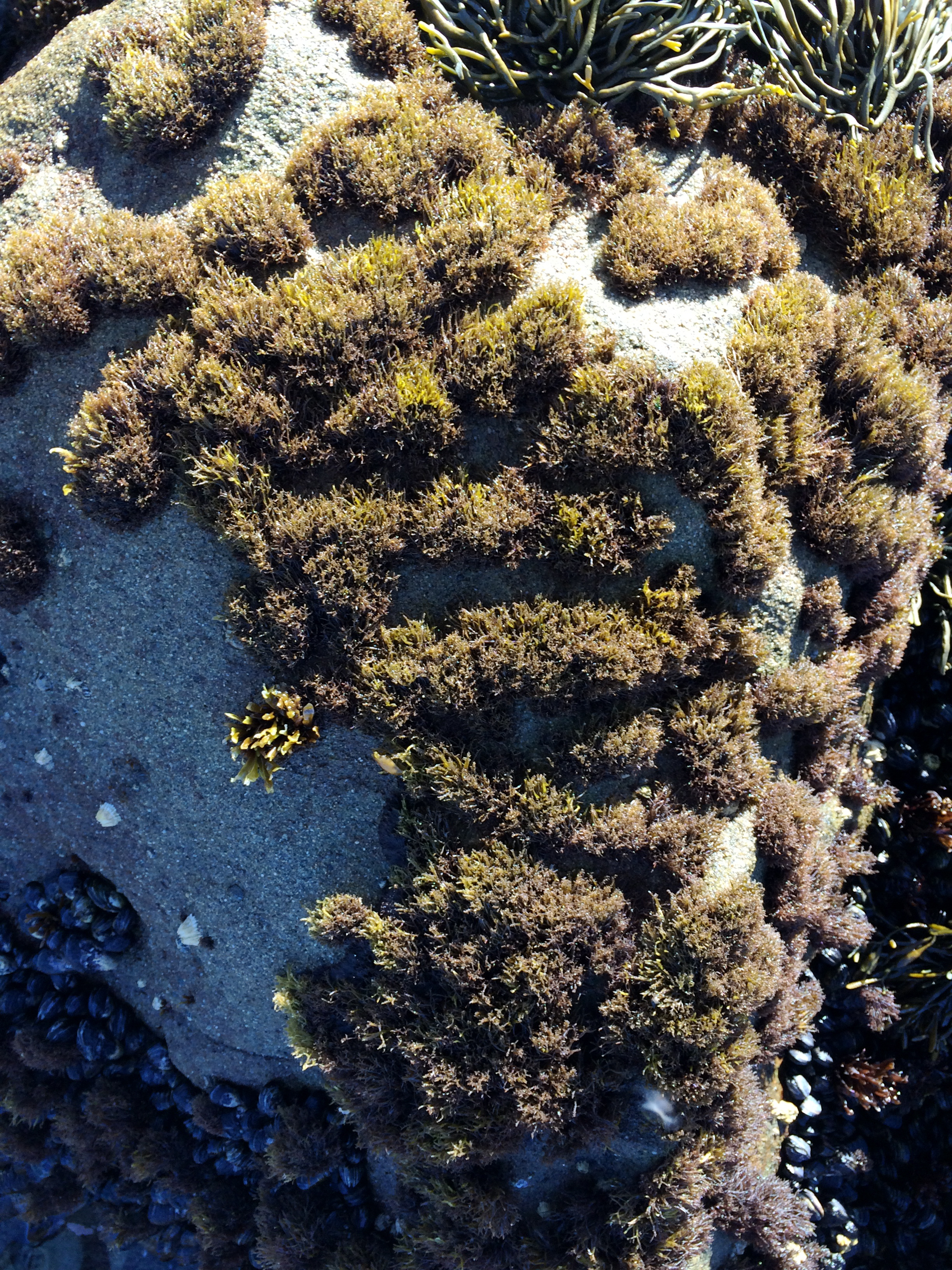
- Endocladia muricata, on a boulder in the upper intertidal zone, near Cambria, California

Scientific classification
- Domain: Eukaryota
- Clade: Archaeplastida
- Division: Rhodophyta
- Class: Florideophyceae
- Order: Gigartinales
- Family: Endocladiaceae
- Genus: Endocladia
- Species: E. muricata

Binomial name
- Endocladia muricata J. Agardh 1841

Synonyms
- Gigartina muricata

= Endocladia muricata =

Species of alga

Endocladia muricata, commonly known as nailbrush seaweed or turfweed, is a marine alga that is widely distributed along the shores of the North Pacific Ocean, from Alaska to Punto Santo Tomas, Baja California.

E. muricata is common north of Point Conception, and is one of the most common algae in the high intertidal zone of the central California, coast. It commonly forms the top-most conspicuous band of seaweed along that coast. E. muricata often grows with Pelvetiopsis limitata (dwarf rockweed) and Mastocarpus papillatus (Turkish washcloth), on rocks in the high intertidal.

E. muricata's thallus is 4–8 cm tall, short & bushy; branches cylindrical with sub-dichotomous branching; covered with minute, soft conical spines; blackish-brown to dark red to yellow. Dries to almost black. It is usually not slippery to walk on, dry or wet.
