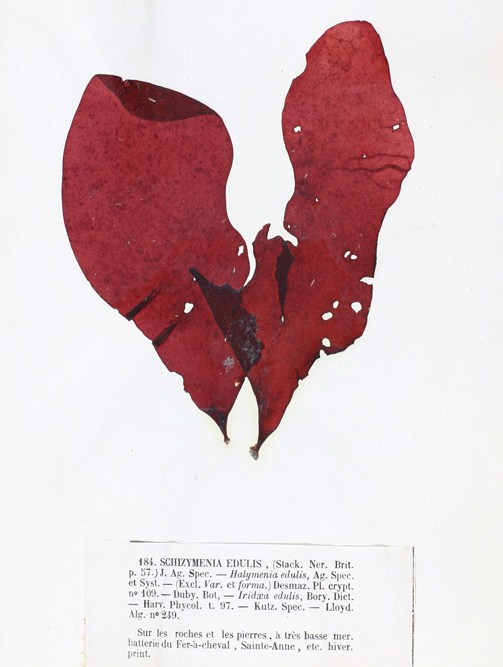
- Dilsea carnosa

Scientific classification
- Clade: Archaeplastida
- Division: Rhodophyta
- Class: Florideophyceae
- Order: Gigartinales
- Family: Dumontiaceae; Bory de Saint-Vincent

Genera
- See text

= Dumontiaceae =

Family of algae

Dumontiaceae is a red alga family in the order Gigartinales.

Species in the British Isles, includes Dumontia contorta (S.G.Gmelin) Ruprecht.

== Genera ==
According to WoRMS;

- Andersoniella F.Schmitz
- Constantinea Postels & Ruprecht, 1840
- Cryptosiphonia J.Agardh, 1876
- Dasyphloea Montagne, 1842
- Dilsea Stackhouse, 1809
- Dudresnaya P.L.Crouan & H.M.Crouan, 1835
- Dumontia J.V.Lamouroux, 1813
- Farlowia J.Agardh, 1876
- Gibsmithia Doty, 1963
- Hyalosiphonia Okamura, 1909
- Kraftia Shepley & Womersley, 1983
- Leptocladia J.Agardh, 1892
- Masudaphycus S.C.Lindstrom, 1988
- Neodilsea Tokida, 1943
- Orculifilum Lindstrom, 1987
- Pikea Harvey, 1853
- Rhodopeltis Harvey, 1863
- Thuretellopsis Kylin, 1925
- Waernia R.T.Wilce, Maggs & Sears, 2003
- Weeksia Setchell, 1901

Also;

- Former genus Borrichius S.F.Gray, 1821 now accepted as synonym of Dudresnaya
- Former genus Litharthron Weber-van Bosse, 1904, now accepted as synonym of Rhodopeltis
