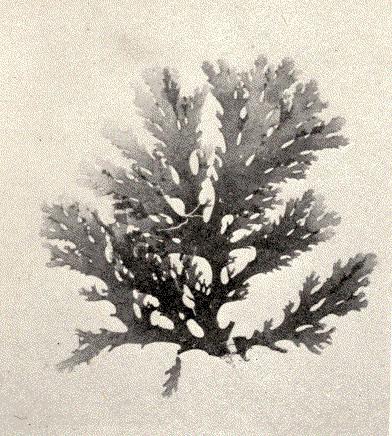
- Callophyllis variegata

Scientific classification
- Domain: Eukaryota
- Clade: Archaeplastida
- Division: Rhodophyta
- Class: Florideophyceae
- Order: Gigartinales
- Family: Kallymeniaceae
- Genus: Callophyllis; Kützing, 1843

Species
- Callophyllis acrocarpa; Callophyllis adhaerens; Callophyllis adnata; Callophyllis angustifrons; Callophyllis atrosanguinea; Callophyllis beringensis; Callophyllis calliblepharoides; Callophyllis centrifuga; Callophyllis cervicornis; Callophyllis coccinia; Callophyllis crassifolia; Callophyllis crenulata; Callophyllis crispata; Callophyllis decumbens; Callophyllis depressa; Callophyllis dissecta; Callophyllis divaricata; Callophyllis edentata; Callophyllis elongata; Callophyllis fastigiata; Callophyllis filicina; Callophyllis gardneri; Callophyllis haenophylla; Callophyllis hayamensis; Callophyllis heanophylla; Callophyllis japonica; Callophyllis laciniata; Callophyllis laingiana; Callophyllis lambertii; Callophyllis lecomtei; Callophyllis ligulata; Callophyllis linearis; Callophyllis linguata; Callophyllis mageshimensis; Callophyllis marginifructa; Callophyllis megalocarpa; Callophyllis microdonta; Callophyllis nana; Callophyllis obtusifolia; Callophyllis odonthalioides; Callophyllis ornata; Callophyllis palmata; Callophyllis papulosa; Callophyllis phyllohaptera; Callophyllis pinnata; Callophyllis platyna; Callophyllis plumosa; Callophyllis radula; Callophyllis rangiferina; Callophyllis rhynchocarpa; Callophyllis stenophylla; Callophyllis tenera; Callophyllis thompsonii; Callophyllis variegata; Callophyllis violacea

= Callophyllis =

Genus of algae

Callophyllis is a red algae genus in the family Kallymeniaceae. Several species are exploited as edible seaweeds under the common name carola, most commonly Callophyllis variegata.
