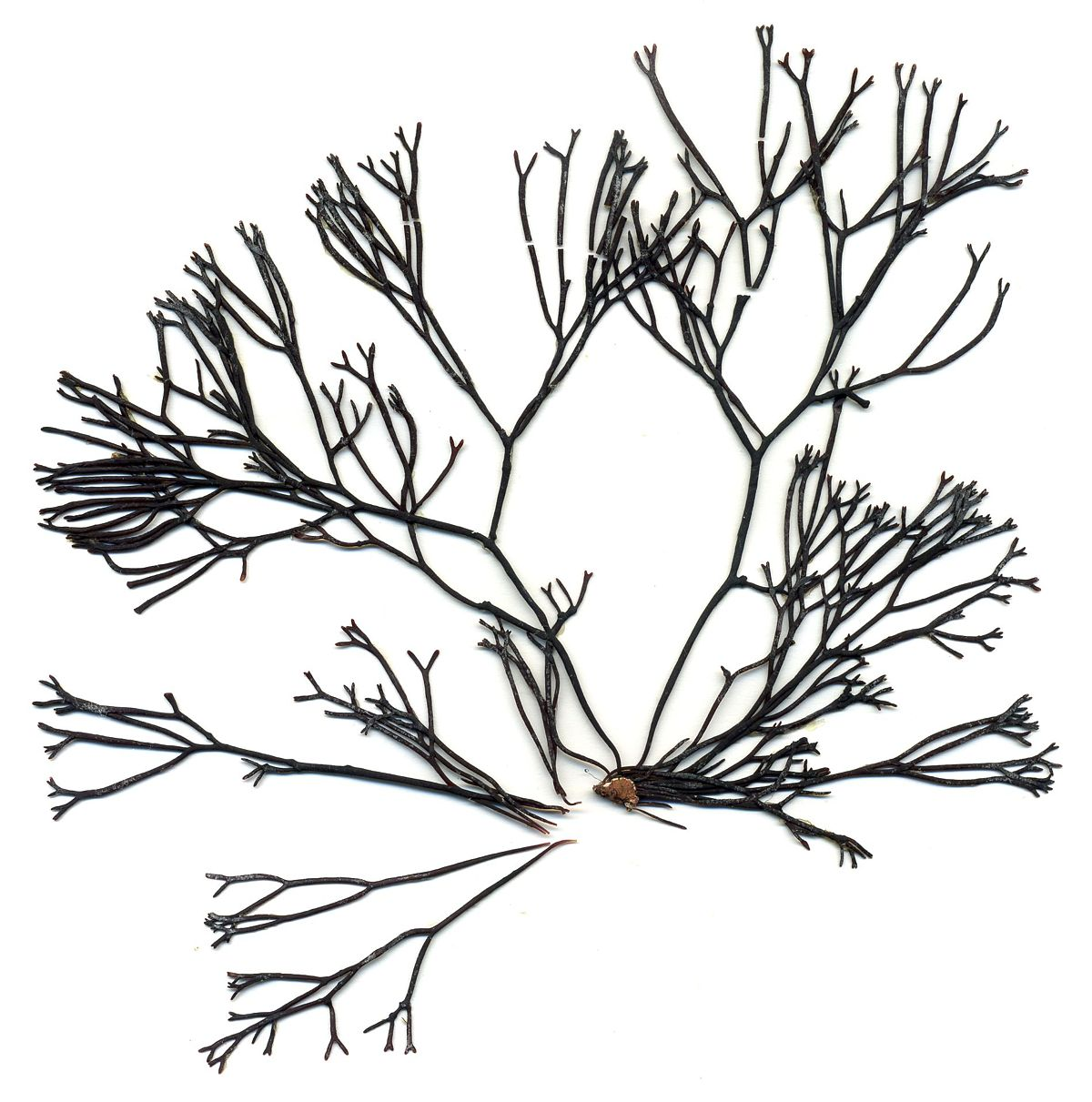
- Polyidaceae

Scientific classification
- Clade: Archaeplastida
- Division: Rhodophyta
- Class: Florideophyceae
- Order: Gigartinales
- Family: Polyidaceae; Harald Kylin, 1956

Genera
- Polyides

= Polyidaceae =

Family of algae

Polyidaceae is a red algae family in the order Gigartinales.

Gigartinales, like all Florideophyceae, are exclusively multicellular. This order, including almost half of the florideophycidaean families, consists of some 100 genera and 700 species.

The Polyidaceae family includes Polyides rotunda.
