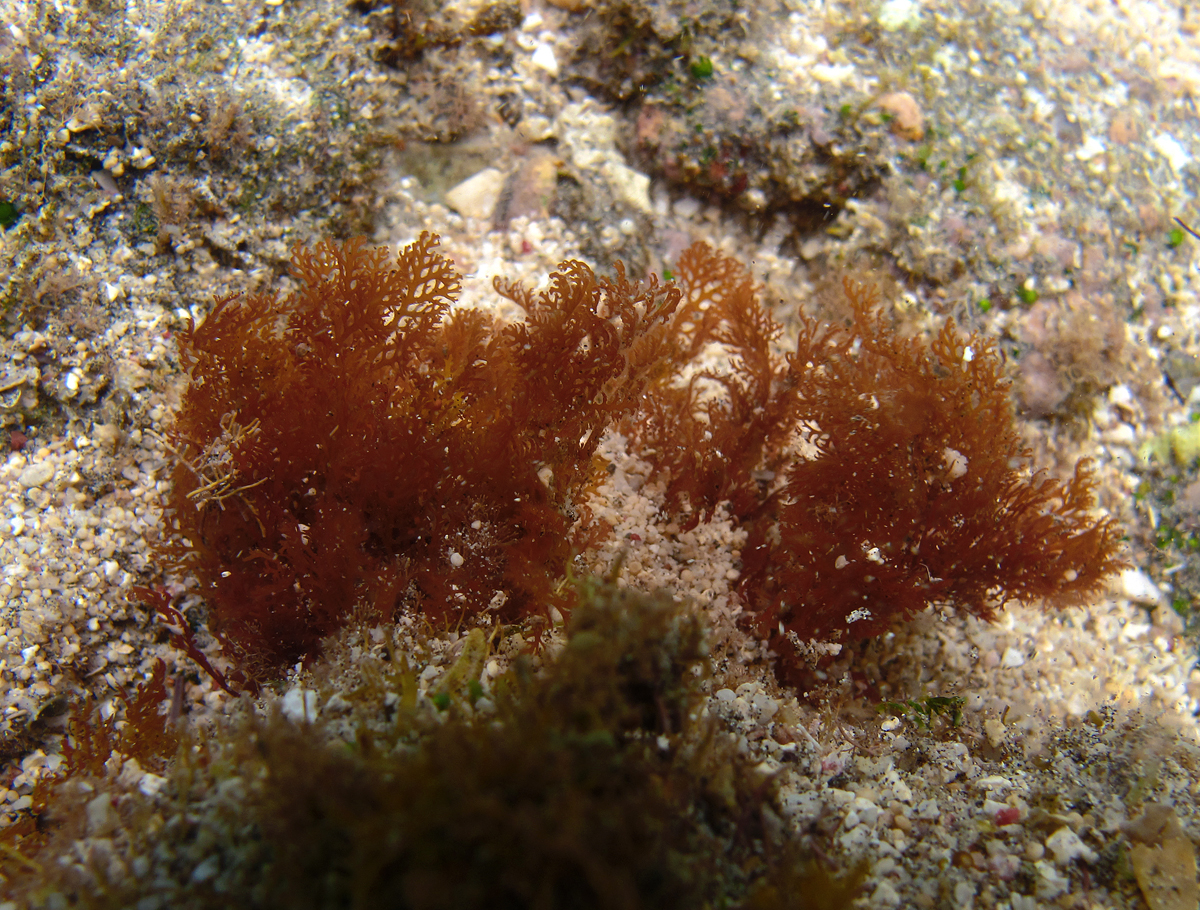
- Portieria hornemannii

Scientific classification
- Domain: Eukaryota
- Clade: Archaeplastida
- Division: Rhodophyta
- Class: Florideophyceae
- Order: Gigartinales
- Family: Rhizophyllidaceae
- Genus: Portieria; Zanardini, 1851

= Portieria =

Genus of algae

Portieria is a genus of red algae in the family Rhizophyllidaceae.

== Species ==
The following species are recognised in the genus Portieria:

- Portieria dichotoma (Hauck) P. C. Silva
- Portieria harveyi (J. Agardh) P. C. Silva
- Portieria hornemannii (Lyngbye) P. C. Silva
- Portieria japonica (Harvey) P. C. Silva
- Portieria spinulosa (Kützing) P. C. Silva
- Portieria tripinnata (Hering) P. C. Silva
