= Antrocentrum =

Scientific classification
- Clade: Archaeplastida
- Division: Rhodophyta
- Class: Florideophyceae
- Order: Gigartinales
- Family: Acrotylaceae
- Genus: Antrocentrum; Kraft & Min-Thein, 1983

Genus of algae

Antrocentrum is a genus of red algae belonging to the family Acrotylaceae.

The species of this genus are found in Australia.

== Species ==
Species:

- Antrocentrum nigrescens (Harvey) Kraft & Min-Thein, 1983
