= Dudresnaya =

Scientific classification
- Clade: Archaeplastida
- Division: Rhodophyta
- Class: Florideophyceae
- Order: Gigartinales
- Family: Dumontiaceae
- Genus: Dudresnaya; P.Crouan & H.Crouan

Genus of algae

Dudresnaya is a genus of red algae.

The genus name of Dudresnaya is in honour of Guy-Ambroise Dudresnay (1770 - 1837), a French soldier interested in Botany and correspondent with Bonnemaison.

The genus was circumscribed by Théophile Bonnemaison in J. Phys. Chim. Hist. Nat. Arts Vol.94 on page 180 in 1822.

== Taxonomy ==
Dudresnaya contains the following species:

- Dudresnaya verticillata
- Dudresnaya bermudensis
