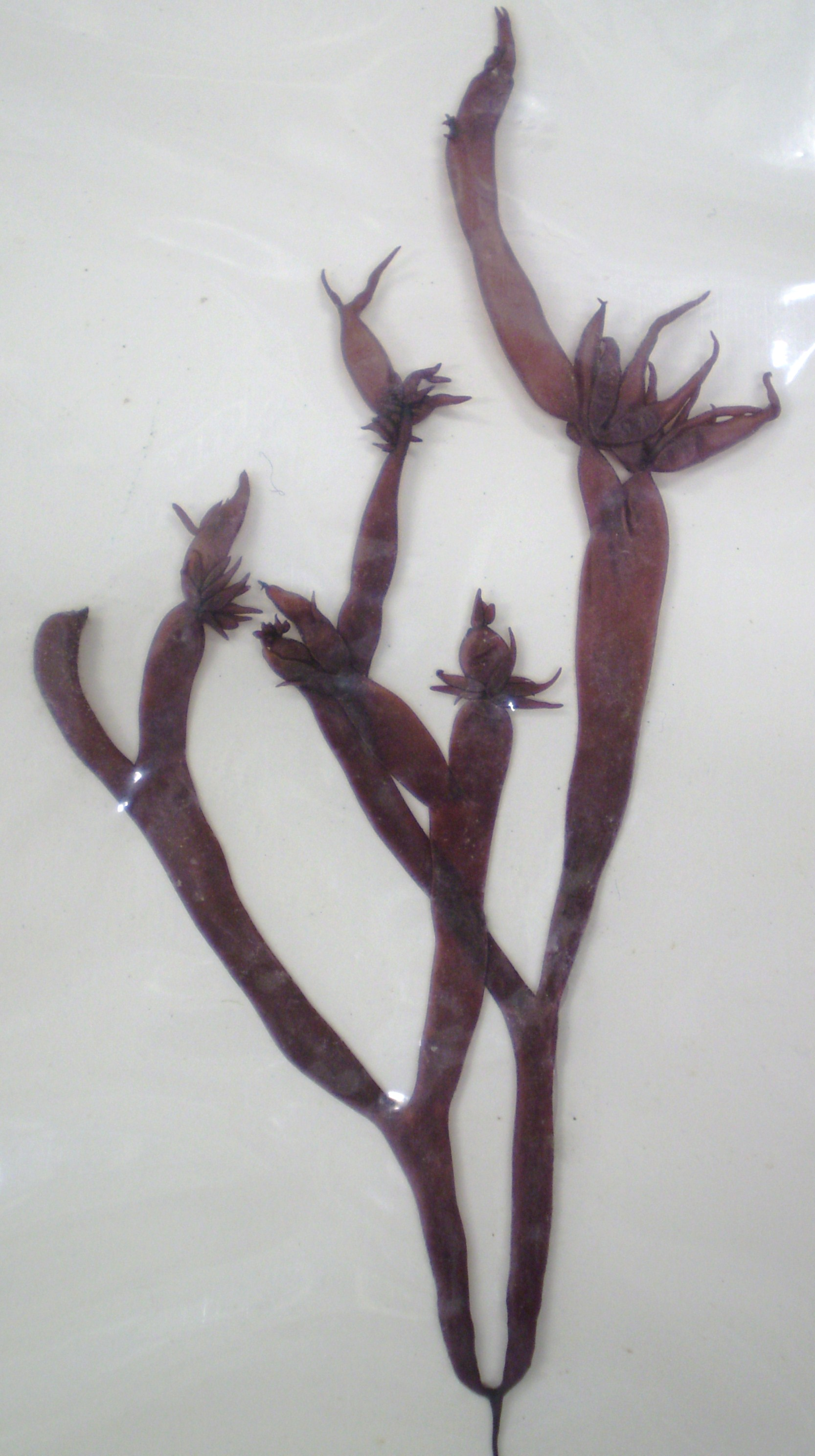
- Gloiopeltis furcata

Scientific classification
- Domain: Eukaryota
- Clade: Archaeplastida
- Division: Rhodophyta
- Class: Florideophyceae
- Order: Gigartinales
- Family: Endocladiaceae
- Genus: Gloiopeltis; J.Agardh, 1842

= Gloiopeltis =

Genus of algae

Gloiopeltis is a genus of red algae belonging to the family Endocladiaceae.

The species of this genus are found in Northern America and Eastern Asia.

Species:

- Gloiopeltis complanata (Harvey) Yamada, 1932
- Gloiopeltis furcata (Postels & Ruprecht) J.Agardh
- Gloiopeltis tenax (Turner) Agardh
