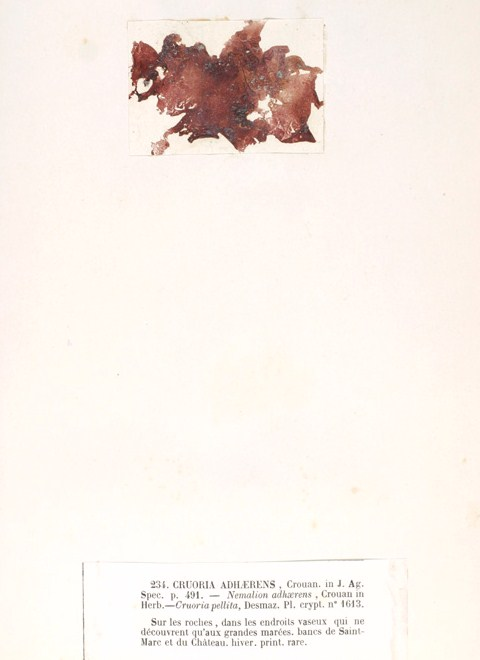
- Cruoria pellita

Scientific classification
- Clade: Archaeplastida
- Division: Rhodophyta
- Class: Florideophyceae
- Order: Gigartinales
- Family: Cruoriaceae
- Genus: Cruoria

Species
- C. adhaerens C. arctica C. areschougii C. australis C. cruoriaeformis C. firma C. indica C. middendorfii C. pacifica C. pellita C. profunda C. purpurea C. rivularis C. rosea C. sachalinensis C. stilla C. verrucosa

= Cruoria =

Genus of algae

Cruoria is a genus of crustose red alga – that is, a seaweed.

It resembles the genera Ralfsia, Lithoderma and Hildenbrandtia.
