= Huonia melvillensis =

Forestwatcher

Conservation status
- Vulnerable (IUCN 3.1)

Scientific classification
- Kingdom: Animalia
- Phylum: Arthropoda
- Clade: Pancrustacea
- Class: Insecta
- Order: Odonata
- Suborder: Anisoptera
- Superfamily: Libelluloidea
- Family: Libellulidae
- Genus: Huonia
- Species: H. melvillensis

Binomial name
- Huonia melvillensis Brown & Theischinger, 1998

Species of dragonfly

Huonia melvillensis is a species of dragonfly of the family Libellulidae, known as the forestwatcher. It is the only species of Huonia in Australia, where it has been found on Melville Island, Northern Territory. It inhabits pools in streams. It is a small dragonfly with black and pale green markings and a clubbed abdomen.

== Etymology ==
The genus name Huonia is named for Huon Gulf in eastern Papua New Guinea, where the original specimens of the genus were collected.

The species name melvillensis is named for Melville Island, Northern Territory, where the original specimens of the species were collected.

== Gallery ==
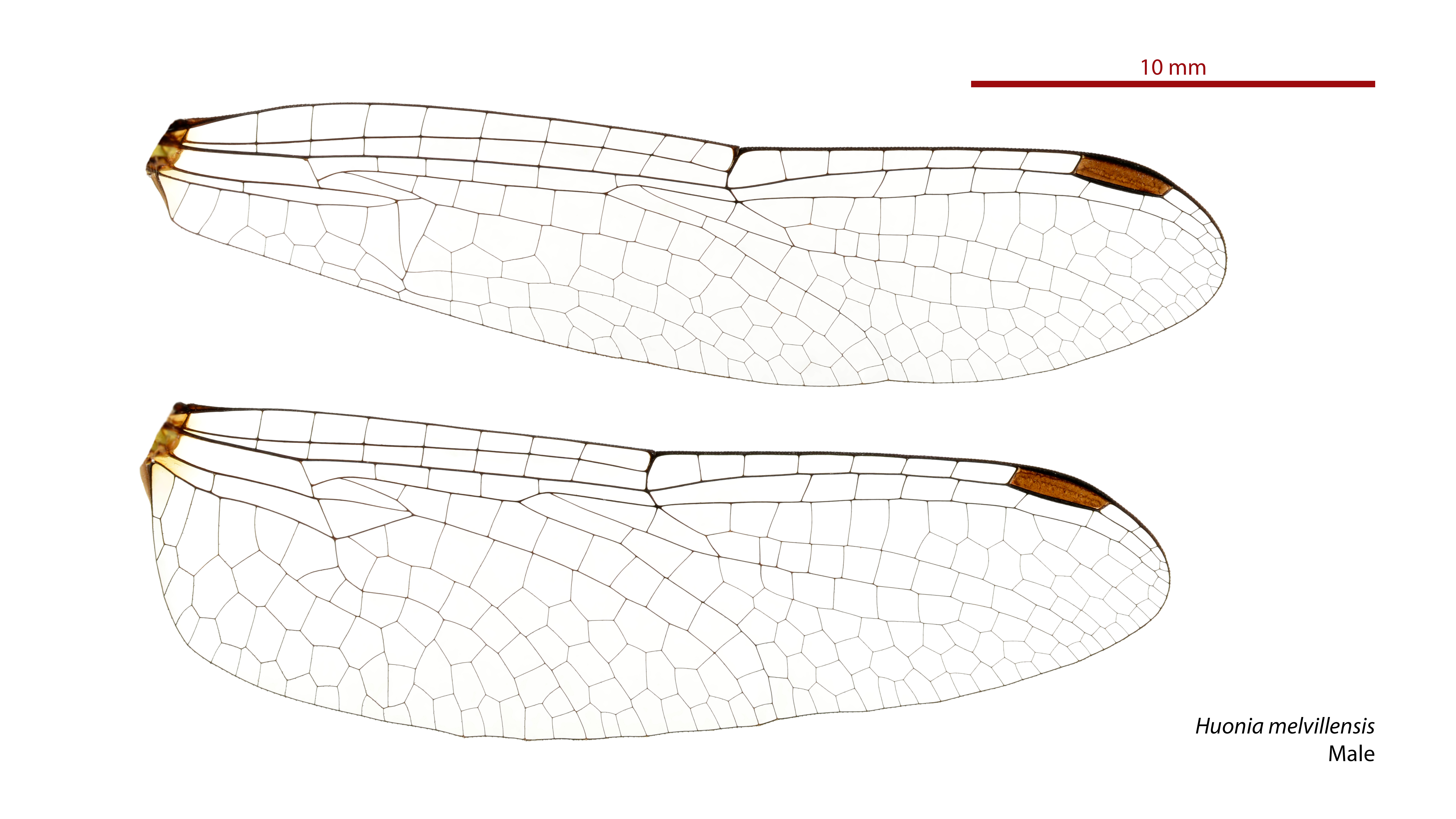
Male wings

== See also ==
- List of Odonata species of Australia
