= Antoine Risso =

Niçard naturalist (1777–1845)

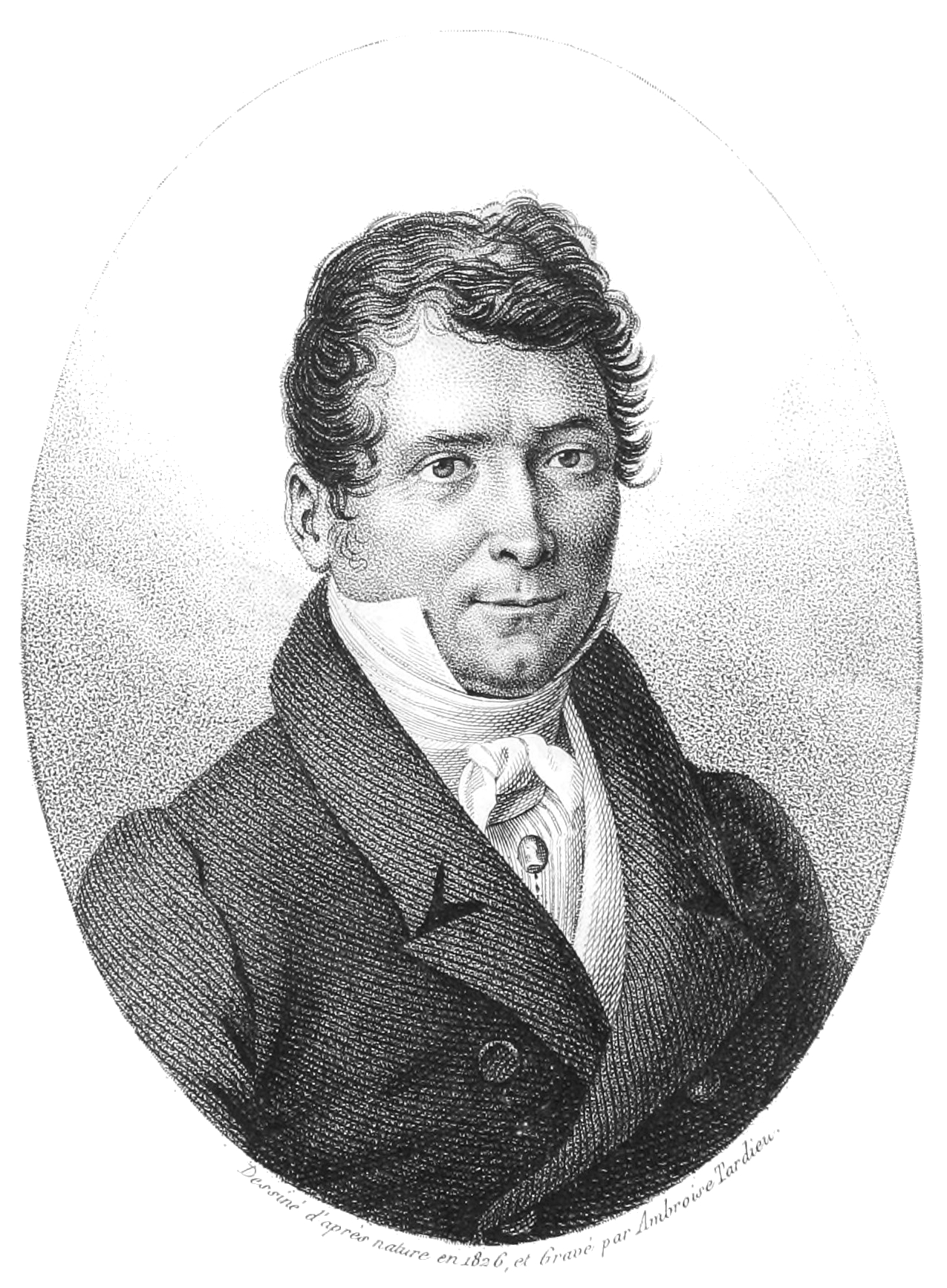
- Antoine Risso
- Born: 8 April 1777; Nice, Duchy of Savoy, Kingdom of Sardinia (in modern France)
- Died: 25 August 1845 (aged 68); Nice, Kingdom of Sardinia
- Scientific career
- Fields: natural history
- Author abbrev. (botany): Risso
- Author abbrev. (zoology): Risso

Giuseppe Antonio Risso (8 April 1777 – 25 August 1845), called Antoine Risso (French pronunciation: [ɑ̃twan ʁiso]), was a naturalist from Nice.

Risso was born in the city of Nice in the Duchy of Savoy, and studied under Giovanni Battista Balbis. He published Ichthyologie de Nice (1810), Histoire naturelle de l'Europe méridionale (1826) and Histoire Naturelle des Orangers (1818–1822). Risso's dolphin was named after him. He is denoted by the author abbreviation Risso when citing a botanical name; the same abbreviation is used for zoological names.

== Genera and species named after him ==
- Rissoa Freminville in Desmarest, 1814: a genus of gastropods
- Rissoella Gray, 1847: a genus of gastropods
- Rissoina d’Orbigny, 1840: a genus of gastropods
- Rissoella J.Agardh, 1849: a genus of red algae
- Electrona risso (Cocco, 1829): a lanternfish
- Polyacanthonotus rissoanus (De Filippi & Vérany, 1857): smallmouth spiny eel

== Genera and species named by him ==
He named 549 marine genera and species. IPNI gives 81 records for Risso.

== Bibliography ==
- (in French) Risso A. (1818). "Memoire sur quelques Gasteropodes nouveaux, Nudibranches et Tectibranches observes dans la Mer de Nice". Journal de Physique, de Chimie, d'Histoire Naturelle et des Arts 87: 368–377.
- (in French) Risso A. (1826–1827). Histoire naturelle des principales productions de l'Europe Méridionale et particulièrement de celles des environs de Nice et des Alpes Maritimes. Paris, Levrault.
  - (1826). Vol. 1: XII + 448 pp., 1 plate.
  - (November 1827). Vol. 2: VII + 482 pp., 8 pl. (flowers).
  - (September 1827). Vol. 3: XVI + 480 pp., 14 pl. (fishes).
  - (November 1826). Vol. 4: IV + 439 pp., 12 pl. (molluscs).
  - (November 1827). Vol. 5: VIII + 400 pp., 10 pl. (other invertebrates).
- Emig C. C., 2012. Révision des espèces de brachiopodes décrites par A. Risso. Carnets de Géologie / Notebooks on Geology, Article 2012/02 (CG2012_A02) with the scientific bibliography of A. Risso in an appendix
