= Leniea =

Scientific classification
- Domain: Eukaryota
- Clade: Archaeplastida
- Division: Rhodophyta
- Class: Florideophyceae
- Order: Gigartinales
- Family: Kallymeniaceae
- Genus: Leniea; R.L. Moe, 2009

Species
- Leniea lubrica R.L. Moe, 2009; Leniea kylinii (Baardseth) G.W.Saunders, 2017

Species of alga

Leniea is a genus of Antarctic marine red alga.

The genus name of Leniea is in honour of Pieter J. Lenie (1923–2015) (Belgian-) American (captain of the American Antarctic research ship RV Hero).

The genus was circumscribed by Richard Lee Moe in Bot. Mar. vol.52 on page 523 in 2009.
