= Michael E. Jung =

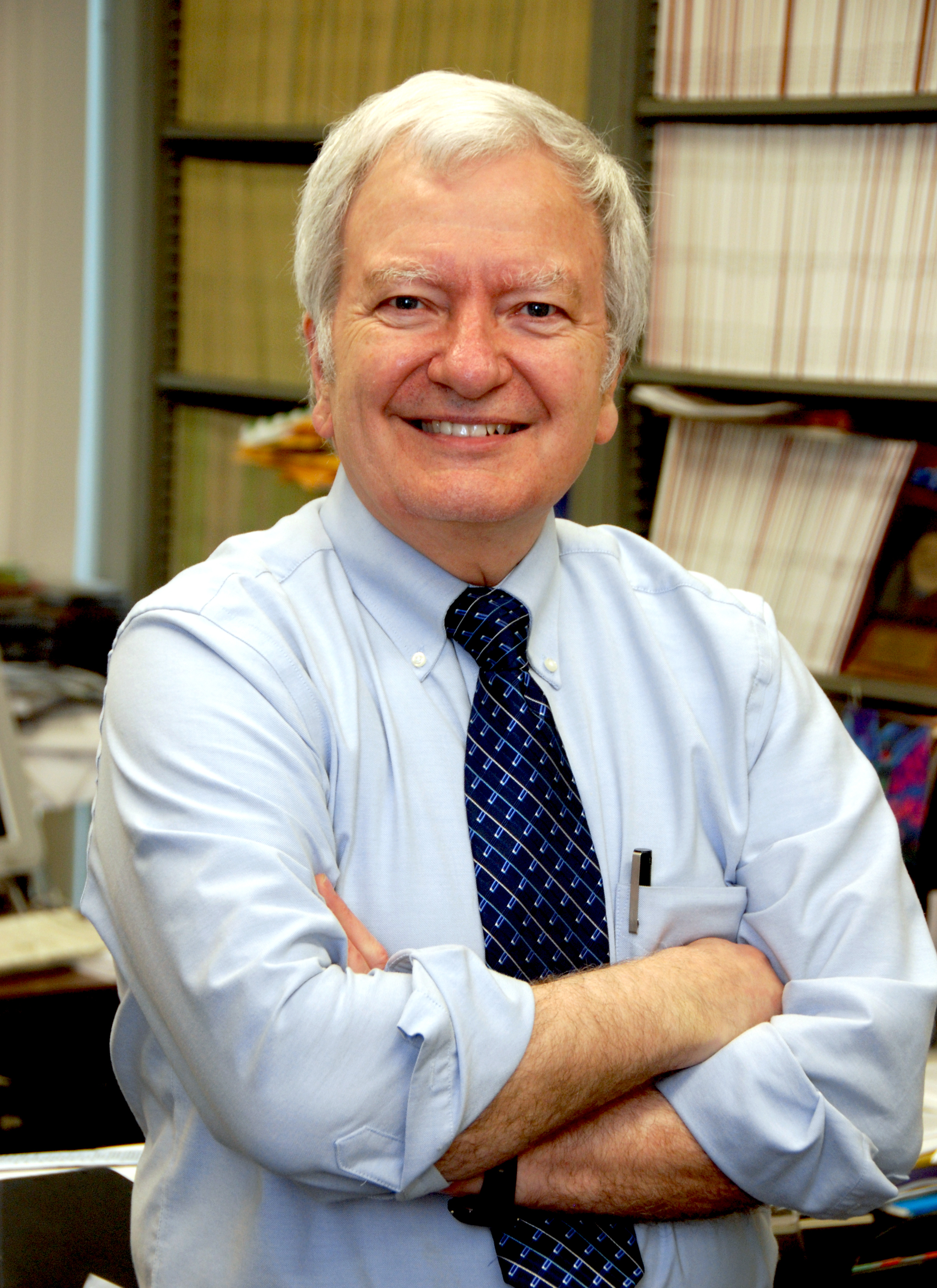
- Jung in 2016
- Born: May 14, 1947 (age 77); New Orleans
- Occupation: Professor

Michael E. Jung is a Professor of Chemistry in the Department of Chemistry and Biochemistry at the University of California at Los Angeles.

Michael Jung was born May 14, 1947, in New Orleans, Louisiana.

== Early life and education ==
Jung received a B.A. from Rice University in Houston, Texas, in 1969 and a Ph.D. from Columbia University in New York City in 1973 where he did research with Gilbert Stork.

== Career ==
Oxetanocin A

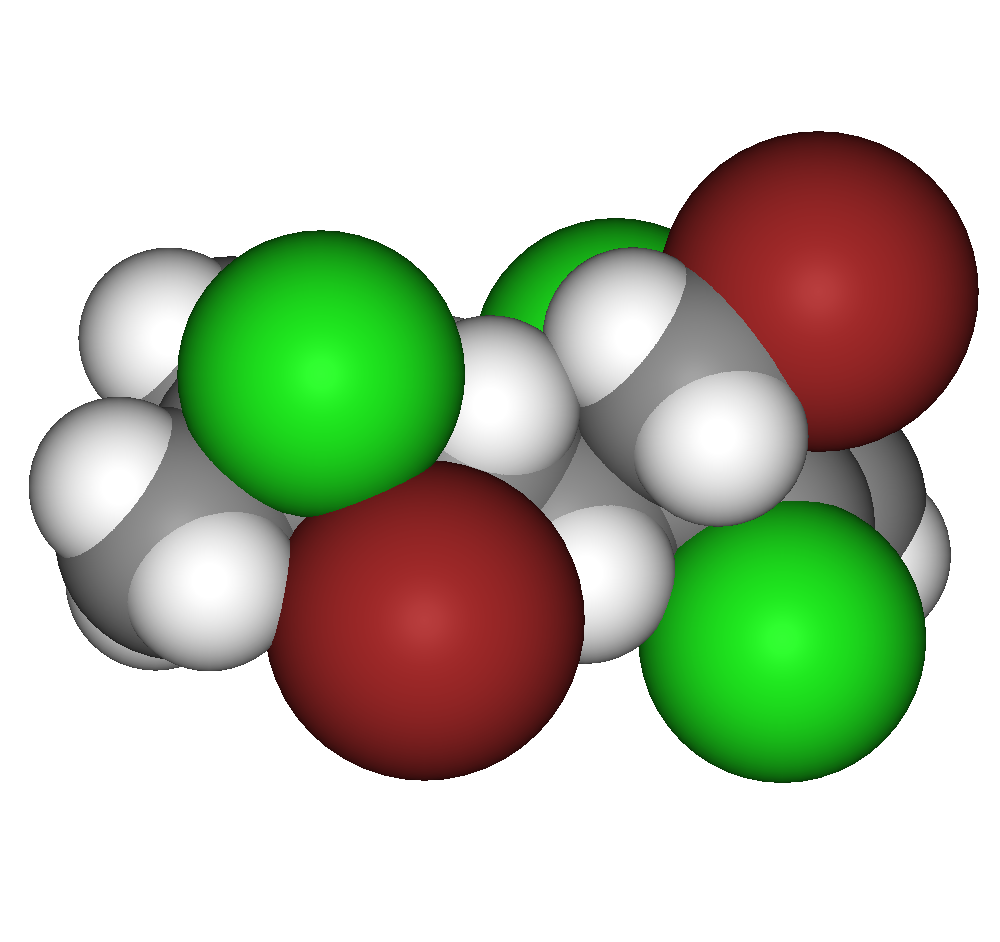
Halomon

Enzalutamide

Jung then obtained a NATO Postdoctoral Fellowship to work with Albert Eschenmoser at the Eidgenössische Technische Hochschule in Zürich, Switzerland. In 1974, he joined the faculty at UCLA, where he has spent his career. In 1979 Jung was awarded a Sloan research fellowship.

Jung's research is focused on the development of new reactions for organic synthesis, including the Jung "non-aldol aldol" protocol, an alternate method for obtaining aldol products without using the classical aldol reaction. He has also developed chemical syntheses for a variety of natural products with antitumor and antiviral properties including tedanolides, oxetanocin, halomons, and xestobergsterol. Other research interests include the bridged Robinson annulation and the mixed Lewis acid Diels-Alder process.

Apalutamide

Jung's research group developed an antagonist of the androgen receptor enzalutamide, which is a pharmaceutical drug used for the treatment of hormone refractory prostate cancer. An analog of enzalutamide, apalutamide, was also FDA approved.

== Awards ==
- 2022 IUPAC-Richter Prize
- 2016 Glenn T. Seaborg Medal, UCLA
- 2016 Richard C. Tolman Award, Southern California Section of the American Chemical Society
- 2015 American Association for Cancer Research AACR Awards Team Science Award
- 1995 American Chemical Society Arthur C. Cope Scholar Award
