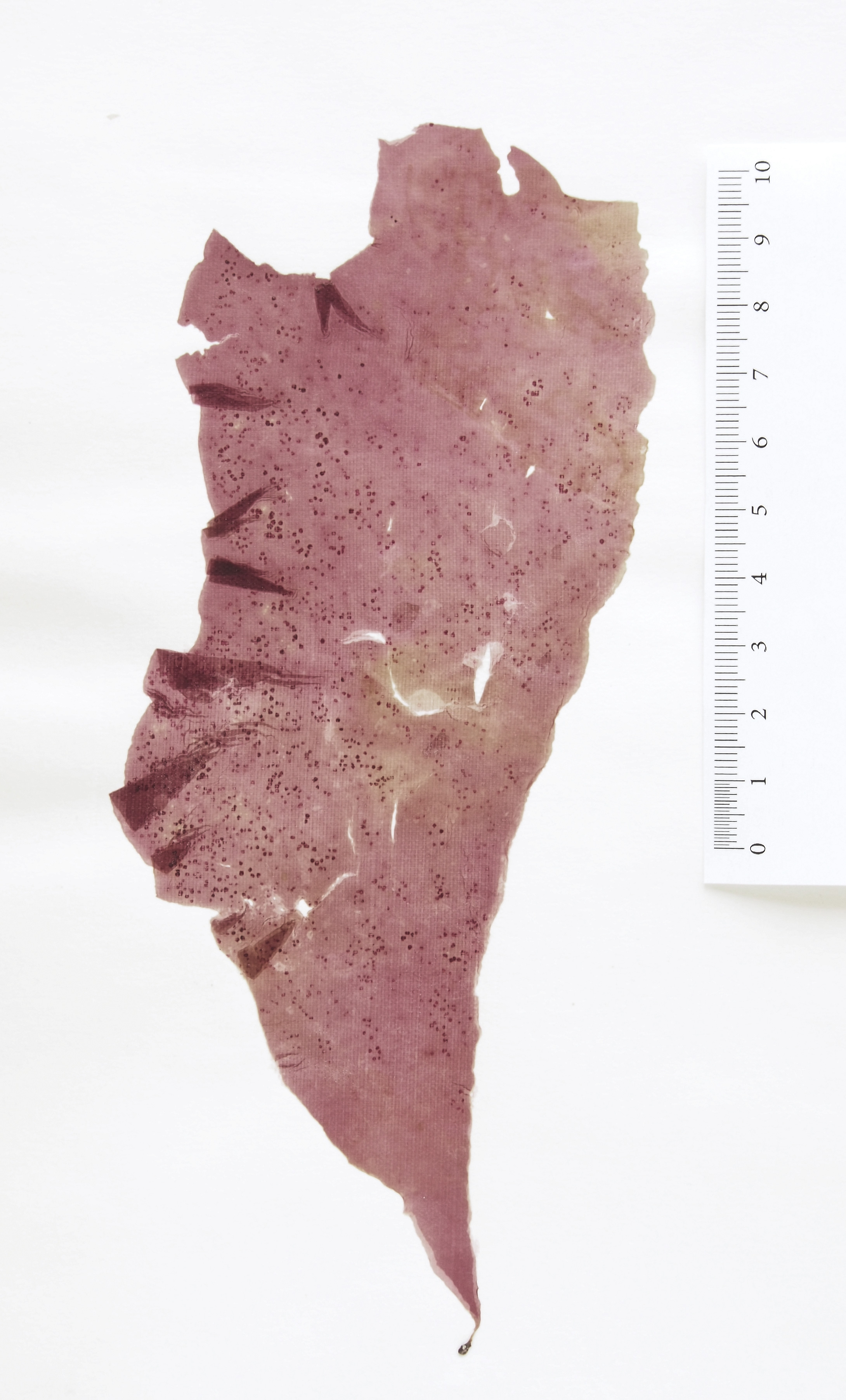
- Kallymenia reniformis

Scientific classification
- Domain: Eukaryota
- Clade: Archaeplastida
- Division: Rhodophyta
- Class: Florideophyceae
- Order: Gigartinales
- Family: Kallymeniaceae
- Genus: Kallymenia; J.Agardh, 1842

= Kallymenia =

Genus of algae

Kallymenia is a genus of red algae belonging to the family Kallymeniaceae.

The genus has cosmopolitan distribution.

== Species ==
Species:

- Kallymenia agardhii R.E.Norris, 1964
- Kallymenia baldwinii E.Y.Dawson, 1966
- Kallymenia bleckii E.Y.Dawson, 1966
- Kallymenia ercegovicii Vergés et al., 2014
- Kallymenia feldmannii Codomier, 1972
- Kallymenia lacerata Feldmann, 1942
- Kallymenia lacinifolia Levring, 1944
