= Leptocladia =

Scientific classification
- Domain: Eukaryota
- Clade: Archaeplastida
- Division: Rhodophyta
- Class: Florideophyceae
- Order: Gigartinales
- Family: Dumontiaceae
- Genus: Leptocladia; J.Agardh, 1892

Genus of algae

Fig. 2. Leplocladia binghamiae J. Agardh. A tetrasporic plant from Punta Descanso, Baja Calif., D. 5299.

Leptocladia is a genus of red algae known from the warm temperate eastern Pacific.

== Species ==
Some species include:

- L. binghamiae
- L. binhamiae
- L. laxa
- L. peruviana
