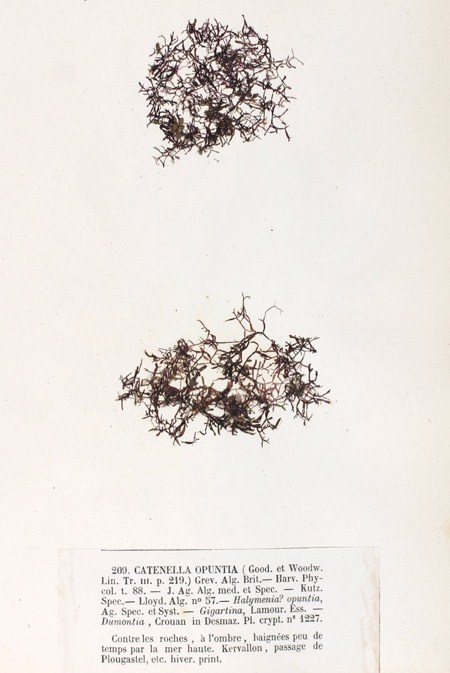
- Catenella caespitosa

Scientific classification
- Clade: Archaeplastida
- Division: Rhodophyta
- Class: Florideophyceae
- Order: Gigartinales
- Family: Caulacanthaceae
- Genus: Catenella; Greville, 1830

= Catenella =

Genus of algae

Catenella is a genus of red algae belonging to the family Caulacanthaceae.

The genus has almost cosmopolitan distribution.

Species:

- Catenella caespitosa (With.) L.M.Irvine
- Catenella impudica (Mont.) J.Agardh
