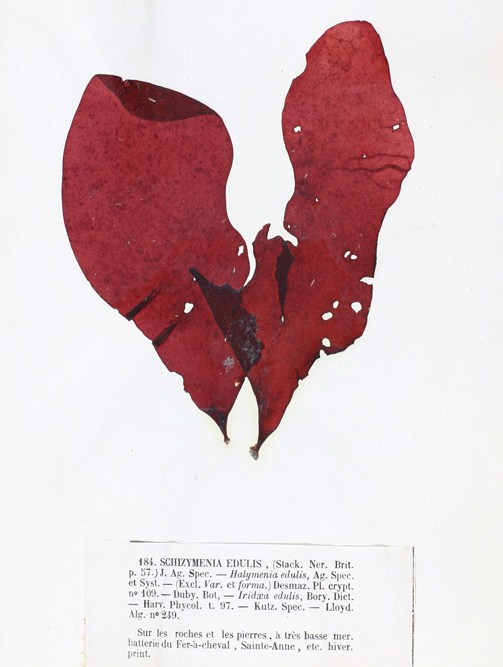
- Dilsea carnosa

Scientific classification
- Domain: Eukaryota
- Clade: Archaeplastida
- Division: Rhodophyta
- Class: Florideophyceae
- Order: Gigartinales
- Family: Dumontiaceae
- Genus: Dilsea; Stackhouse, 1809

Species
- Dilsea californica (J.Agardh) Kuntze; Dilsea carnosa (Schmidel) Kuntze; Dilsea edulis Stackhouse S - type species Dilsea integra (Kjellman) Rosenvinge; Dilsea lindstromiae G.W.Saunders; Dilsea natashae (S.C.Lindstrom) G.W.Saunders & S.C.Lindstrom; Dilsea pygmaea (Setchell) Setchell; Dilsea socialis (Postels & Ruprecht) Perestenko

= Dilsea =

Genus of algae

Dilsea is a red algae genus in the Dumontiaceae family.

== Habitat ==
Dilsea carnosa has been located along the coasts of several countries within the United Kingdom in high frequencies.
