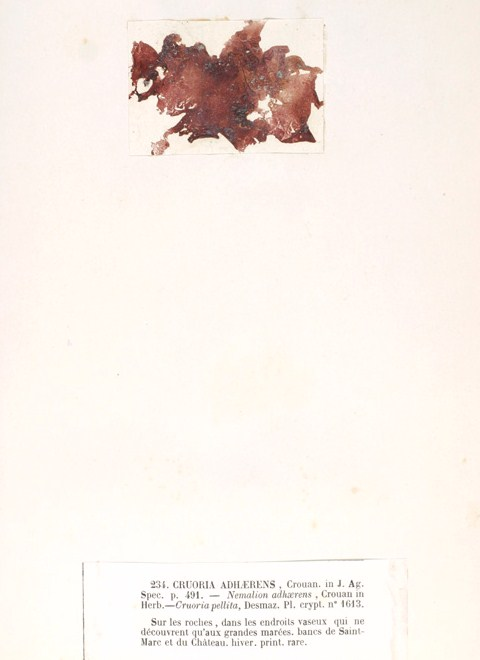
- Cruoria pellita

Scientific classification
- Domain: Eukaryota
- Clade: Archaeplastida
- Division: Rhodophyta
- Class: Florideophyceae
- Order: Gigartinales
- Family: Cruoriaceae (J.Agardh) Kylin

Genera
- Cruoria; Erythroclathrus; Pseudopolyides

= Cruoriaceae =

Family of algae

Cruoriaceae is a family of crustose red algae – that is, a seaweed.
