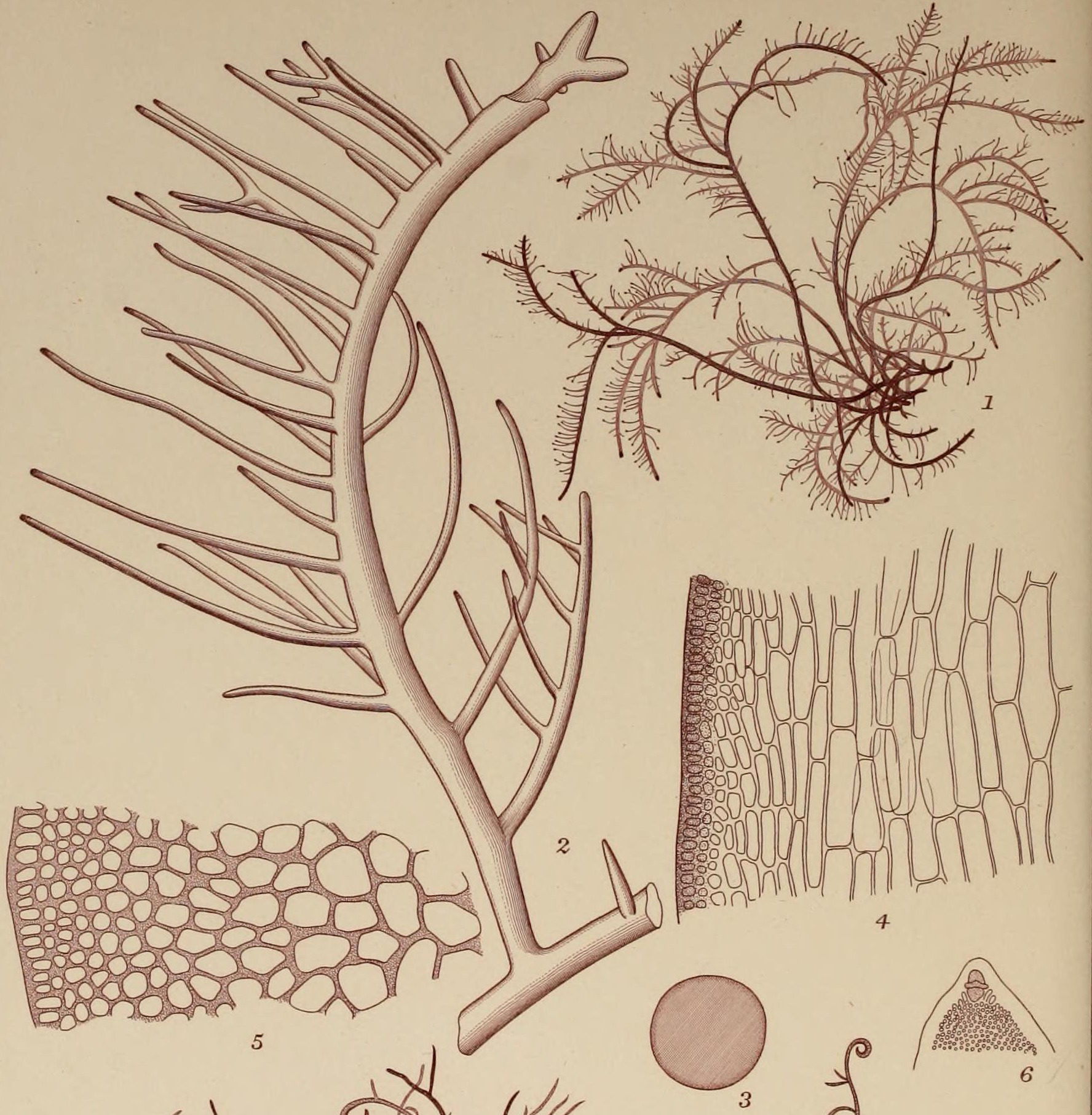
- Hypnea musciformis

Scientific classification
- Domain: Eukaryota
- Clade: Archaeplastida
- Division: Rhodophyta
- Class: Florideophyceae
- Order: Gigartinales
- Family: Cystocloniaceae
- Genus: Hypnea; J.V.Lamouroux, 1813

Species
- See text

= Hypnea =

Genus of algae

Hypnea is a genus of red algae, and a well known carrageenophyte (plant producing polysaccharide carrageenan).

== Taxonomy and nomenclature ==
Hypnea is a genus of red seaweed under class Florideophyceae, order Gigartinales, and family Cystocloniaceae. There are 99 species listed on Algaebase with 78 being accepted taxonomically. The genus was originally classified under family Hypneaceae, which was considered distinct from Cystoclonoiaceae on the basis of differences in their carposporophyte structure, and the shape of the thalli and cortical cells. Differences in carrageenan chemistry, with Hypneaceae species producing kappa-carrageenan and Cystocloniaceae producing lambda-carrageenan, was another reason for their distinction. However, these criteria were questioned and molecular analysis later showed that the two families had similar vegetative and reproductive characters. Furthermore, it was proven that lambda-carrageenan and kappa-carrageen coexist within the Gigartinales order. This led to the two families being merged into simply Cystocloniaceae.

=== Phylogenetics ===
Phylogeography of Hypnea valentiae in India indicates that nuclear ribosomal DNA Internal transcribed spacer-1 (ITS1) sequences had 4.35 x 10-1 Tamura 3-parameter (T3P) pairwise distance between them, which indicate significant evolutionary differences accumulated over time. In comparison, T3P distance between related genera Kappaphycus and Eucheuma was 1.85 x 10–1. In phylogeny reconstruction using Bayesian inference, both the isolates formed a well-supported clade along with the only available accession of this genus at ITS1 locus, indicating affiliation of both the isolates in this genus. The isolate from the west coast was more basal in the phylogram, which suggests phylogenetically primitive position of this population. Newly generated DNA barcodes of the geographic isolates of this native carrageenophyte in this study is expected to be a key in tracing its further dispersal routes, either natural or deliberate. This is the first report on the comparative morphological and molecular assessment of Hypnea from India.

== Morphology ==
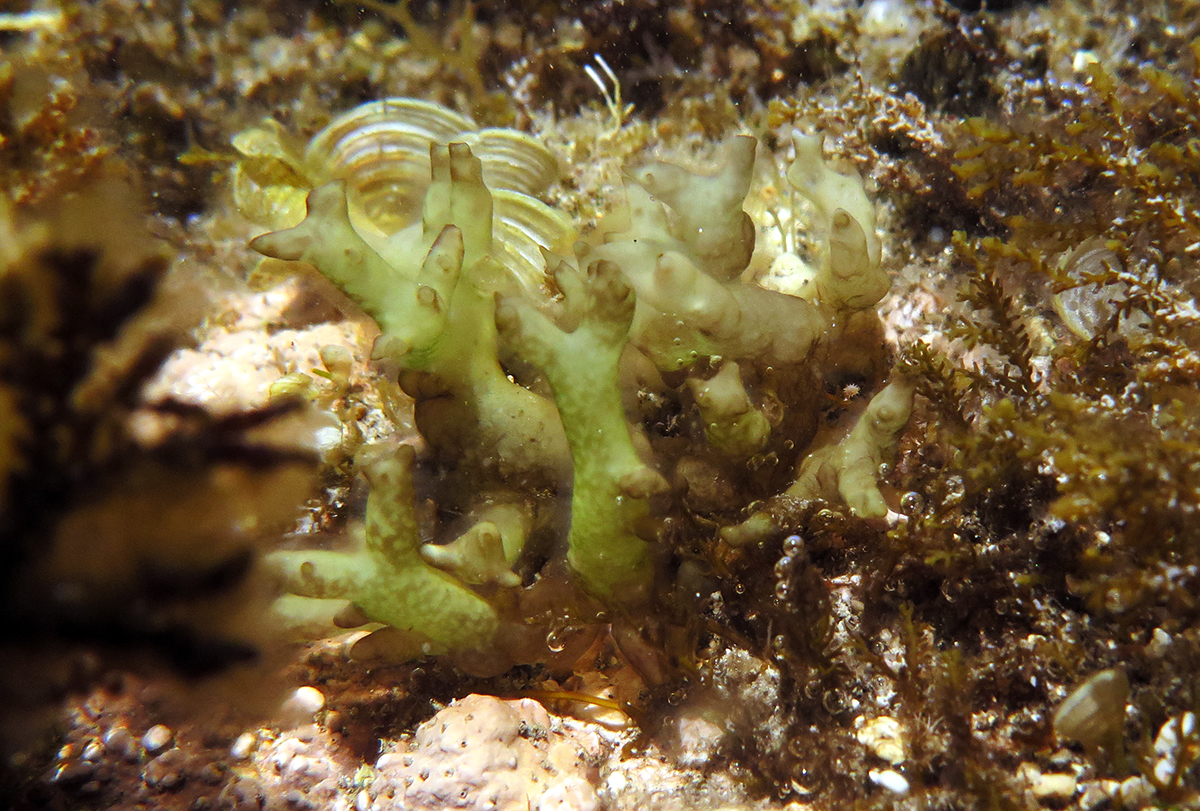
Hypnea cf. pannosa (Quod, 2016)

Hypnea is characterized by membranous or cartilaginous thalli which can be either erect or prostrate. The thallus features a main axis with an apex of varying shapes (straight, curved, tendril or bifurcated). Various forms of branching occur, with the irregular type being most common, with dichotomous or lateral branching occurring in some species. Thallus color is highly variable, with yellow, green, pink, red, brown and black being observed. Habitat type can influence thallus length, which varies from 0.5 to 50 cm. The habit of the thallus is used to divide species into two major groups: those with >10 cm thallus height, and those that measure between 2–3 cm. Like many other algal species, Hypnea exhibits a high degree of phenotypic plasticity and cryptic diversity which makes species difficult to distinguish from each other morphologically since they share many characters.

== Distribution ==
The genus is found in the Atlantic, Pacific, and Indian Oceans, with the Atlantic having the most species. In terms of countries, China has the most number of species although none are endemic. Other countries with many endemic species of Hypnea include South Africa, Australia, Japan, Indonesia, Mauritius, the Philippines, India, and Brazil. Hypnea musciformis has the widest geographical distribution.

== Ecology ==
Hypnea is commonly present in various habitats, from intertidal and subtidal zones, as well as in sites with varying degrees of exposure. They can also be found growing as epiphytes on other organisms such as the brown alga Sargassum. The genus exhibits seasonal abundance which is highly influenced by similarly seasonal variations in light, temperature, and tidal levels.

== Life history ==
Hypnea exhibits a dioecious thallus and a triphasic life cycle consisting of two diploid phases and a haploid phase. The diploid carposporophyte releases carpospores that develop into a diploid tetrasporophyte which undergoes meiosis to form four haploid tetraspores which will form 50/50 male and female gametophytes. After fertilization of gametes, the carposporophyte is formed and the cycle begins again.

== Chemical composition ==
Carrageenans are abundant in the cell walls of some red algae, where they provide the thallus with additional flexibility to protect it from the impacts of herbivory, wave action, and desiccation. Environmental variables such as temperature, amount of rainfall, and salinity likely influence the yield and viscosity of the carrageenan.

== Cultivation and utilization ==
Hypnea is cultivated in many tropical countries such as the Philippines, Brazil, Bangladesh, India and Vietnam for food and for their kappa- carrageenan extracts. After Eucheuma/Kappaphycus, it is the second most important source of carrageenan in the tropics, however it is only cultivated in experimental settings and not commercially. The technology needed to do this is still being developed and requires further investigation. Most experimental cultivation activities have been done using Hypnea musciformis, and its highly variable morphology may be partly responsible for the inconsistency in the results of these experiments.

Carrageenan has a wide range of applications from food to pharmaceutical uses. The extracts of various Hypnea species have been investigated for their antiviral, antibacterial, antioxidant and antifungal properties.

== Known species ==
- Hypnea musciformis
- Hypnea valentiae
- Hypnea adunca J.Agardh S
- Hypnea alopecuroides Kützing C
- Hypnea anastomosans Papenfuss, Lipkin & P.C.Silva C
- Hypnea arborescens P.Crouan & H.Crouan S
- Hypnea arbuscula P.J.L.Dangeard C
- Hypnea arenaria Kylin C
- Hypnea armata (C.Agardh) J.Agardh S
- Hypnea asiatica P.J.L.Geraldino, E.C.Yang & S.M.Boo C
- Hypnea aspera Kützing S
- Hypnea boergesenii T.Tanaka S
- Hypnea brasiliensis P.B.Jesus, Nauer & J.M.C.Nunes C
- Hypnea bryoides Børgesen C
- Hypnea bullata P.Kundu & F. Bast C
- Hypnea caespitosa P.J.L.Geraldino & S.M.Boo C
- Hypnea californica Kylin S
- Hypnea caraibica Nauer, Cassano & M.C.Oliveira C
- Hypnea cenomyce J.Agardh C
- Hypnea ceramioides Kützing C
- Hypnea cervicornis J.Agardh C
- Hypnea charoides J.V.Lamouroux C
- Hypnea chordacea Kützing C
- Hypnea coccinea (Clemente) Cremades C
- Hypnea compressa Papenfuss C
- Hypnea conferta (Schousboe ex Montagne) Kützing S
- Hypnea confervoides (C.Agardh) J.Agardh S
- Hypnea congesta Papenfuss C
- Hypnea cornuta (Kützing) J.Agardh C
- Hypnea corona Huisman & Petrocelli C
- Hypnea coulteri Harvey S
- Hypnea cryptica P.B.Jesus & J.M.C.Nunes C
- Hypnea cystoclonioides Sonder S
- Hypnea divaricata (C.Agardh) Greville C
- Hypnea divergens (C.Agardh) J.Agardh S
- Hypnea ecklonii Suhr C
- Hypnea edeniana F.Nauer, V.Cassano & M.C.Oliveira C
- Hypnea episcopalis Hooker f. & Harvey S
- Hypnea esperi Bory U
- Hypnea evermannii Setchell & N.L.Gardner C
- Hypnea fastigiata Harvey S
- Hypnea filiformis (Harvey) Womersley C
- Hypnea flagelliformis Greville ex J.Agardh C
- Hypnea flava Nauer, Cassano & M.C.Oliveira C
- Hypnea flexicaulis Y.Yamagishi & M.Masuda S
- Hypnea flexuosa A.C.Brown & N.Jarman C
- Hypnea fruticulosa Kützing C
- Hypnea furcellata Hooker f. & Harvey S
- Hypnea furnariana Cormaci, Alongi and Dinaro C
- Hypnea hamulosa (Esper) J.V.Lamouroux C
- Hypnea harveyi Kützing S
- Hypnea hippuroides Kützing S
- Hypnea horrida (C.Agardh) J.Agardh S
- Hypnea indica P.Kundu & F.Bast C
- Hypnea intricata Kylin C
- Hypnea japonica Tanaka C
- Hypnea johnstonii Setchell & N.L.Gardner C
- Hypnea krugiana Hauck C
- Hypnea mamillosa Zanardini U
- Hypnea marchantiae Setchell & N.L.Gardner C
- Hypnea multicornis (Montagne) Montagne C
- Hypnea musciformis (Wulfen) J.V.Lamouroux C
- Hypnea nidifica J.Agardh U Hypnea nidulans Setchell C
- Hypnea nigrescens Greville ex J.Agardh C
- Hypnea pannosa J.Agardh C
- Hypnea pectinella Børgesen C
- Hypnea planicaulis Harvey S
- Hypnea platyclada Barreto de Jesus & Castro Nunes C
- Hypnea pseudomusciformis Nauer, Cassano & M.C.Oliveira C
- Hypnea purpurascens (Hudson) Harvey S
- Hypnea ramentacea (C.Agardh) J.Agardh C
- Hypnea rangiferina (R.Brown ex Turner) Greville S
- Hypnea reptans Papenfuss C
- Hypnea rigens Sonder S
- Hypnea rissoana J.Agardh S
- Hypnea rosea Papenfuss C
- Hypnea rugulosa Montagne C
- Hypnea saidana Holmes S
- Hypnea schneideri Nauer, Cassano & M.C.Oliveira C
- Hypnea secundiramea Montagne S
- Hypnea seticulosa J.Agardh S
- Hypnea simpliciuscula Okamura ex De Toni S
- Hypnea spicifera (Suhr) Harvey C
- Hypnea spicigera Harvey S
- Hypnea spinella (C.Agardh) Kützing C
- Hypnea spongiiformis Zanardini U
- Hypnea stellulifera (J.Agardh) Yamagishi & Masuda C
- Hypnea tenuis Kylin C
- Hypnea unilateralis P.J.L.Dangeard C
- Hypnea ustulata (Turner) Montagne S
- Hypnea vaga Kützing C
- Hypnea valentiae (Turner) Montagne C
- Hypnea valida J.Agardh S
- Hypnea variabilis Okamura C
- Hypnea viridis Papenfuss C
- Hypnea volubilis Searles C
- Hypnea wurdemannii Harvey S
- Hypnea wynnei Nauer, Cassano & M.C.Oliveira C
- Hypnea yamadae Tanaka C
- Hypnea yokoyana Nauer, Cassano & M.C.Oliveira C
