= Austropugetia =

Scientific classification
- Clade: Archaeplastida
- Division: Rhodophyta
- Class: Florideophyceae
- Order: Gigartinales
- Family: Kallymeniaceae
- Genus: Austropugetia; R.L.Moe in Hommersand et al., 2009
- Species: A. crassa

Binomial name
- Austropugetia crassa R.L.Moe in Hommersand et al., 2009

Genus of algae

Austropugetia is a genus of marine red alga. It is monotypic, containing only the species Austropugetia crassa.
