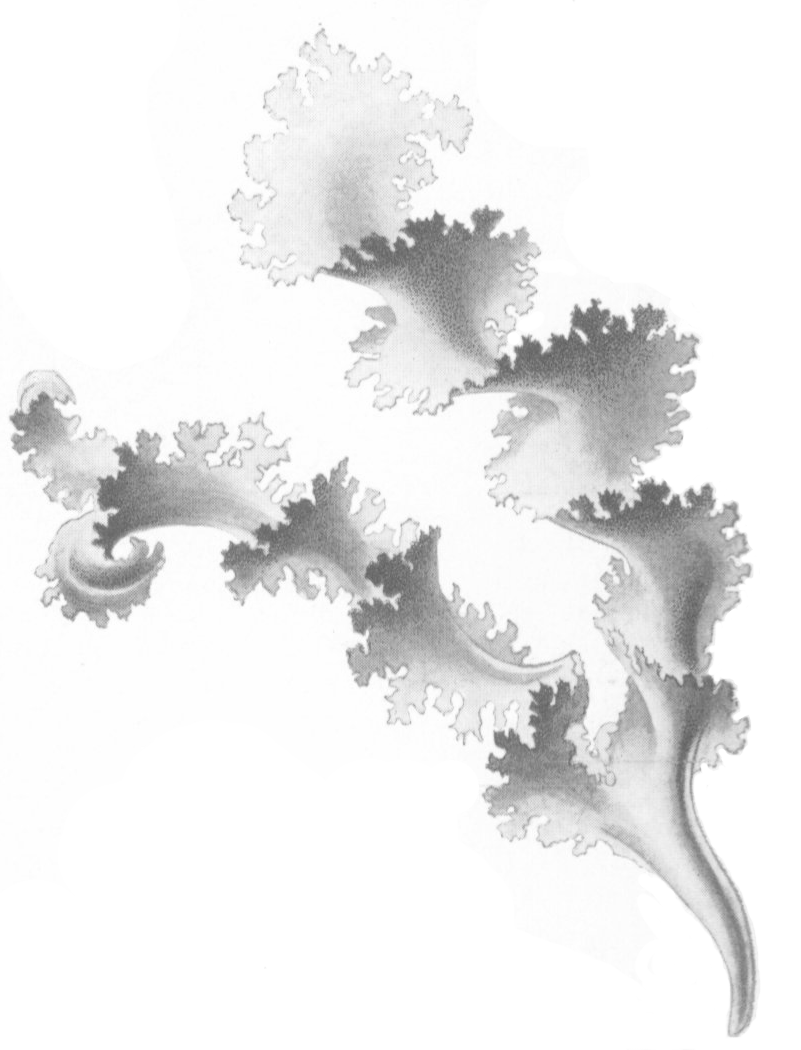

Scientific classification
- Clade: Archaeplastida
- Division: Rhodophyta
- Class: Florideophyceae
- Order: Gigartinales
- Family: Rissoellaceae
- Genus: Rissoella
- Species: R. verruculosa

Binomial name
- Rissoella verruculosa J.Agardh, 1849

= Rissoella verruculosa =

Species of alga

Rissoella verruculosa is a species of red algae, the only accepted species in the genus Risoella and the family Rissoellaceae. This species is endemic to the Mediterranean Sea.

The genus name of Rissoella is in honour of Giuseppe Antonio Risso (1777–1845) and generally called Antoine Risso, who was a Niçard and a naturalist.

Rissoella verruculosa has an amino acid composition with relatively high levels of lysine and methionine for a plant.

Former species Rissoella denticulata (Montagne) J.Agardh, 1851, now accepted as a synonym for Neorubra denticulata (Montagne) M.S.Calderon, G.H.Boo & S.M.Boo, 2014

== Description ==
Rissoella verruculosa consists of simple or unbranched ribbon-like slings that are often twisted with wavy and denticulated borders. It has slingshots measuring 0.5 to 2cm wide and 5 to 20 cm in length. A stipe connects the slings to a discoid base and attaches them to the rock.

The consistency of the seaweed is rubbery, yellow more or less orange or reddish, varies with lighting and moistening. It turns brown when it is long outside the water and returns to its normal initial state when wet.

The blades of the seaweed has on both sides small warts on.

== Alimentation ==
It is an autotrophic plant that creates its organic matter by photosynthesis from water, carbon dioxide and mineral salts with green chlorophyll and with other pigments such as red phycoyerythrin that capture light.

== Reproduction ==
The reproductive cycle of Rissoella verruculosa is made up of three generations and is trigenetic.

Gametophyte carries the sexual organs that produce globular cystocarpes and contain a second generation that comes from the development of the fertilized egg.

The third generation is diploid and will carry tetrasporocysts that are included in the cortex.

== Environment ==
Rissoella verruculosa is visible at the end of the winter season until summer when it extends over the meliottoral rock.

It is found especially on silica substrates and very rare on limestone coasts that are calcifuge exposed to sun and water, which will allow it to withstand temperature, salinity

== Other sources ==
- De Reviers B., 2002, BIOLOGIE ET PHYLOGENIE DES ALGUES, Tome 1 : BIOLOGIE, ed. Belin Sup., 352p.
- Augier H., 2007, GUIDE DES FONDS MARINS DE MEDITERRANEE. ECOLOGIE, FLORE, FAUNE, PLONGEES, Guides du naturaliste, ed. Delachaux et Niestlé, 456p.
- Harmelin J.-G., Bassemayousse F., 2008, MEDITERRANEE, A LA DECOUVERTE DES PAYSAGES SOUS-MARINS, ed. Glénat, 192p.
- De Reviers B., 2002, BIOLOGIE ET PHYLOGENIE DES ALGUES, Tome 2 : EMBRANCHEMENTS, ed. Belin Sup., 255p.
