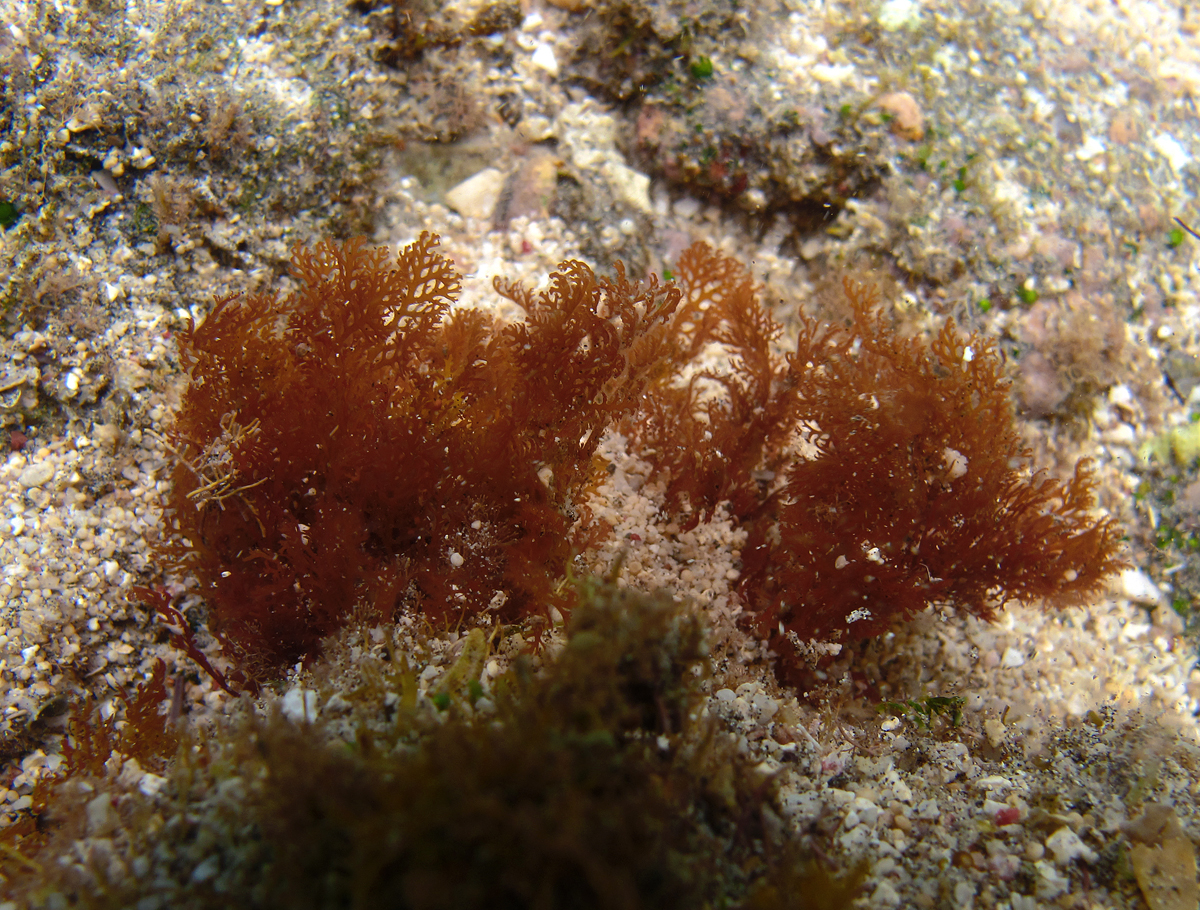
- Portieria hornemannii

Scientific classification
- Domain: Eukaryota
- Clade: Archaeplastida
- Division: Rhodophyta
- Class: Florideophyceae
- Order: Gigartinales
- Family: Rhizophyllidaceae; F.Schmitz, 1889

= Rhizophyllidaceae =

Family of algae

Rhizophyllidaceae is a family of red algae in the order Gigartinales.

== Genera ==
The following genera are recognised in the family Rhizophyllidaceae:

- Contarinia Zanardini, 1843
- Nesophila W.A.Nelson & N.M.Adams , 1993
- Ochtodes J.Agardh, 1872
- Portieria Zanardini, 1851
