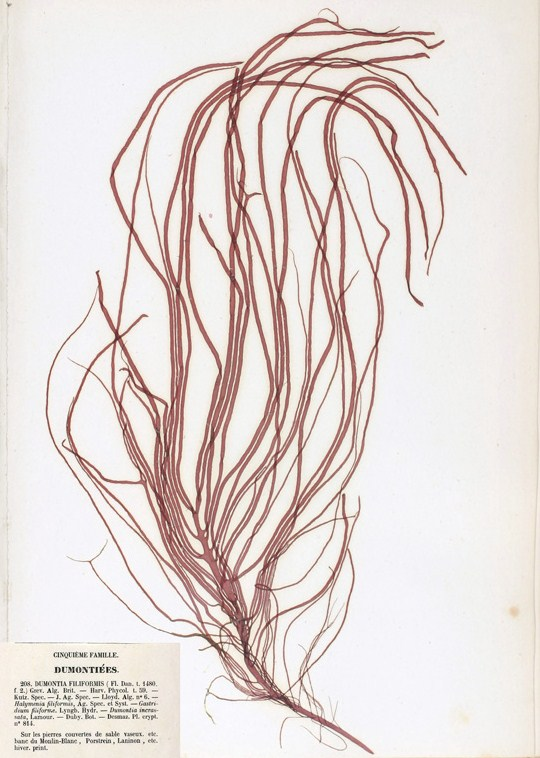
- Dumontia contorta

Scientific classification
- Domain: Eukaryota
- Clade: Archaeplastida
- Division: Rhodophyta
- Class: Florideophyceae
- Order: Gigartinales
- Family: Dumontiaceae
- Genus: Dumontia; J.V.F.Lamouroux, 1813

= Dumontia (alga) =

Genus of algae

Dumontia is a genus of red algae belonging to the family Dumontiaceae.

The species of this genus are found in Eurasia, Northern America and Australia.

The genus name of Dumontia is in honour of Charles Dumont de Sainte-Croix (1758 – 1830), was a French zoologist.

The genus was circumscribed by Jean Vincent Félix Lamouroux in Ann. Mus. Natl. Hist. Nat. Vol.20 on page 133 in 1813.

== Species ==
Known:

- Dumontia alaskana
- Dumontia contorta (S.G.Gmelin) Ruprecht
- Dumontia simplex A.D.Cotton, 1906
