= Halomon =

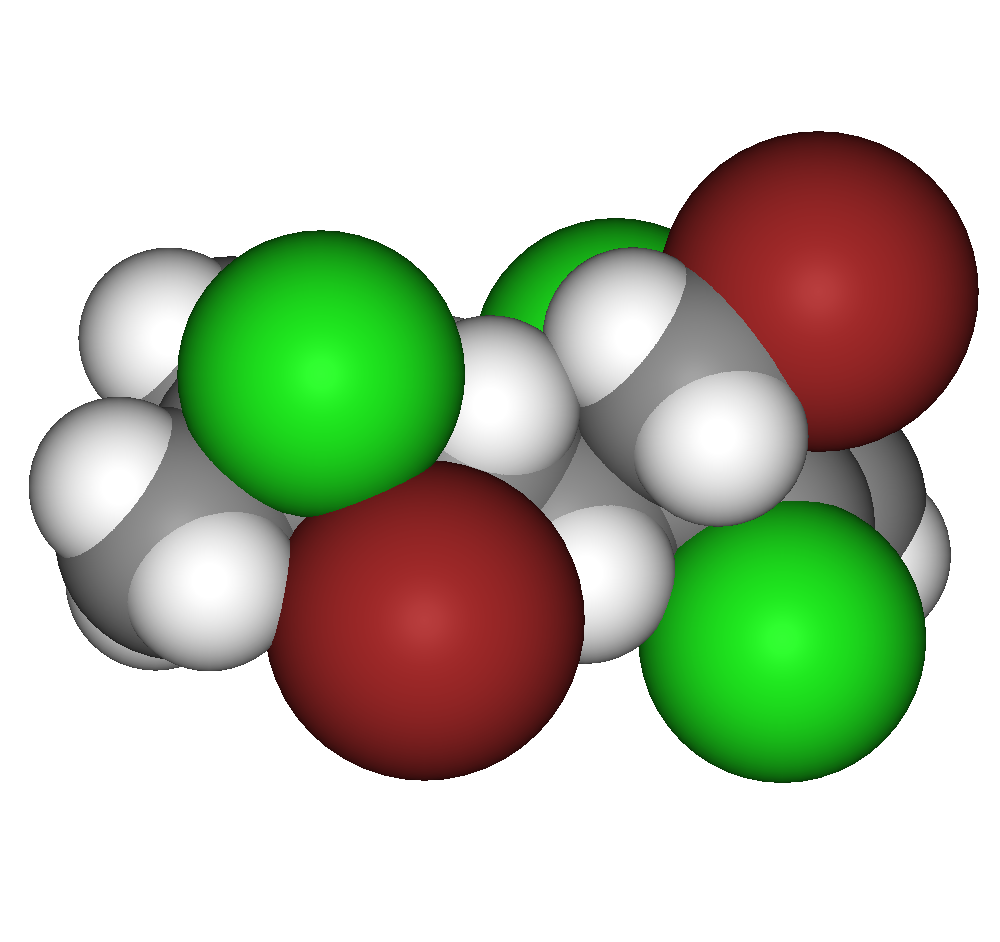
- Halomon

Names
- Preferred IUPAC name (3S,6R)-6-Bromo-3-(bromomethyl)-2,3,7-trichloro-7-methyloct-1-ene
- Other names (−)-Halomon

Identifiers
CAS Number	142439-86-9
3D model (JSmol)	Interactive image
ChEMBL	ChEMBL136685
ChemSpider	116941
PubChem CID	132430
UNII	77KCC2N62J
CompTox Dashboard (EPA)	DTXSID80895855
- InChI: InChI=1S/C10H15Br2Cl3/c1-7(13)10(15,6-11)5-4-8(12)9(2,3)14/h8H,1,4-6H2,2-3H3/t8-,10-/m1/s1 Key: OVLCIYBVQSJPKK-PSASIEDQSA-N; InChI=1/C10H15Br2Cl3/c1-7(13)10(15,6-11)5-4-8(12)9(2,3)14/h8H,1,4-6H2,2-3H3/t8-,10-/m1/s1 Key: OVLCIYBVQSJPKK-PSASIEDQBC
- SMILES: Cl[C@](C(Cl)=C)(CC[C@@H](Br)C(Cl)(C)C)CBr

Properties
Chemical formula	C_{10}H_{15}Br_{2}Cl_{3}
Molar mass	401.3931 g/mol
Density	1.824 g/cm^{3}
Melting point	56 to 57 °C (133 to 135 °F; 329 to 330 K)
- Except where otherwise noted, data are given for materials in their standard state (at 25 °C [77 °F], 100 kPa). verify (what is ?) Infobox references

Halomon is a polyhalogenated monoterpene first isolated from the marine red algae Portieria hornemannii. Halomon has attracted research interest because of its promising profile of selective cytotoxicity that suggests its potential use as an antitumor agent.

Halomon is in a class of chemical compounds known as halocarbons, which are often potent alkylating agents which may be toxic to individual cells or to living organisms. The red algae that naturally produce halomon and other related compounds probably do so as a poisonous defense against fish or other marine life that may see it as a potential source of food. Halomon, however, is a selective toxin; studies at the National Cancer Institute have indicated that it is more toxic to certain types of tumor cells than to other cells.

The algae that produces halomon is difficult to locate, identify, and collect and the concentration of halomon in the organism is extremely low. Therefore, obtaining a sufficient amount of halomon to conduct preclinical research has been difficult. Consequently, there has been active interest in developing synthetic methods in the laboratory for the preparation of halomon and related compounds.

Recent research has shown that halomon and a related halogenated monoterpene may act as demethylating agents, suggesting a possible mechanism of action for the pharmacological effects of halomon.
