= Huonia =

Scientific classification
- Kingdom: Animalia
- Phylum: Arthropoda
- Clade: Pancrustacea
- Class: Insecta
- Order: Odonata
- Infraorder: Anisoptera
- Family: Libellulidae
- Subfamily: Trithemistinae
- Genus: Huonia; Förster, 1903

Genus of dragonflies

Huonia is a genus of dragonfly in the family Libellulidae. Species of this genus are found in Indonesia, New Guinea and Australia.

== Species ==
The genus Huonia includes the following species:

- Huonia arborophila Lieftinck, 1942
- Huonia aruana Lieftinck, 1935
- Huonia daphne Lieftinck, 1953
- Huonia epinephela Förster, 1903
- Huonia ferentina Lieftinck, 1953
- Huonia hylophila Lieftinck, 1942
- Huonia hypsophila Lieftinck, 1963
- Huonia melvillensis Brown & Theischinger, 1998
- Huonia moerens Lieftinck, 1963
- Huonia oreophila Lieftinck, 1935
- Huonia rheophila Lieftinck, 1935
- Huonia silvicola Lieftinck, 1942
- Huonia thais Lieftinck, 1953
- Huonia thalassophila Förster, 1903
- Huonia thisbe Lieftinck, 1953

== Etymology ==
The genus name Huonia is named for Huon Gulf in eastern Papua New Guinea, where the original specimens of the genus were collected.
