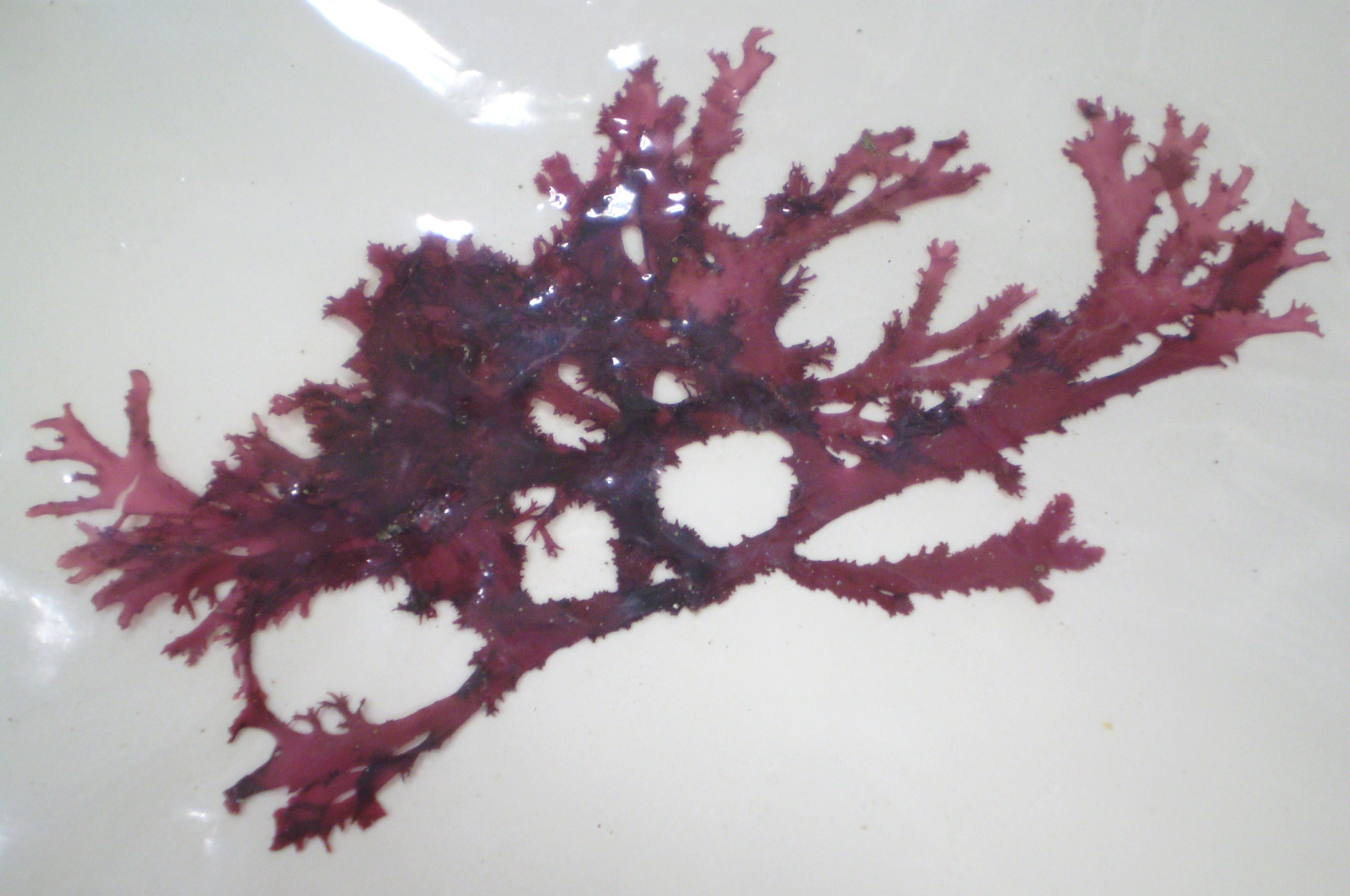
- Callophyllis japonica

Scientific classification
- Clade: Archaeplastida
- Division: Rhodophyta
- Class: Florideophyceae
- Order: Gigartinales
- Family: Kallymeniaceae (J.Agardh) Kylin

Genera
- See text

= Kallymeniaceae =

Family of algae

Kallymeniaceae is a red algae family in the order Gigartinales.

== Genera ==
The following genera are accepted within Kallymeniaceae:

- Austrokallymenia Huisman & G.W.Saunders, 2017
- Austrophyllis Womersley & R.E.Norris, 1971
- Austropugetia R.L.Moe, 2009
- Beringia Perestenko, 1975
- Blastophyllis D'Archino & W.A.Nelson, 2017
- Callocolax F.Schmitz ex Batters, 1895
- Callophyllis Kützing, 1843
- Cirrulicarpus Tokida & Masaki, 1956
- Crossocarpus Ruprecht, 1850
- Ectophora J.Agardh, 1876
- Erythrophyllum J.Agardh, 1872
- Euthora J.Agardh, 1847
- Glaphyrymenia J.Agardh, 1885
- Glaphyrymeniopsis Kraft & G.W.Saunders, 2017
- Hommersandia G.I.Hansen & S.C.Lindstrom, 1984
- Hormophora J.Agardh, 1892
- Huonia G.W.Saunders, 2017
- Ionia Perestenko, 1996
- Judithia D'Archino & S.-M.Lin, 2016
- Kallymenia J.Agardh, 1842
- Kallymeniopsis Perestenko, 1977
- Leiomenia Huisman & G.W.Saunders, 2017
- Leniea R.L.Moe, 2009
- Meredithia J.Agardh, 1892
- Metacallophyllis A.Vergés & L.Le Gall, 2017
- Nothokallymenia A.Vergés & L.Le Gall, 2017
- Nereoginkgo Kylin, 1919
- Polycoelia J.Agardh, 1849
- Psaromenia D'Archino, W.A.Nelson & Zuccarello, 2001
- Pugetia Kylin, 1925
- Rhipidomenia G.W.Saunders, 2017
- Rhizopogonia Kylin, 1934
- Rhytimenia Huisman & G.W.Saunders, 2016
- Salishia Clarkston & G.W.Saunders, 2012
- Stauromenia D'Archino & W.A.Nelson, 2012
- Thalassiodianthus G.W.Saunders & Kraft, 2017
- Thamnophyllis R.E.Norris, 1964
- Tytthomenia G.W.Saunders, 2017
- Varimenia R.L.Moe, 2009
- Velatocarpus Perestenko, 1986
- Verlaquea Le Gall & Vergés, 2017
- Wendya D'Archino & S.-M.Lin, 2016
- Zuccarelloa D'Archino & W.A.Nelson, 2017
