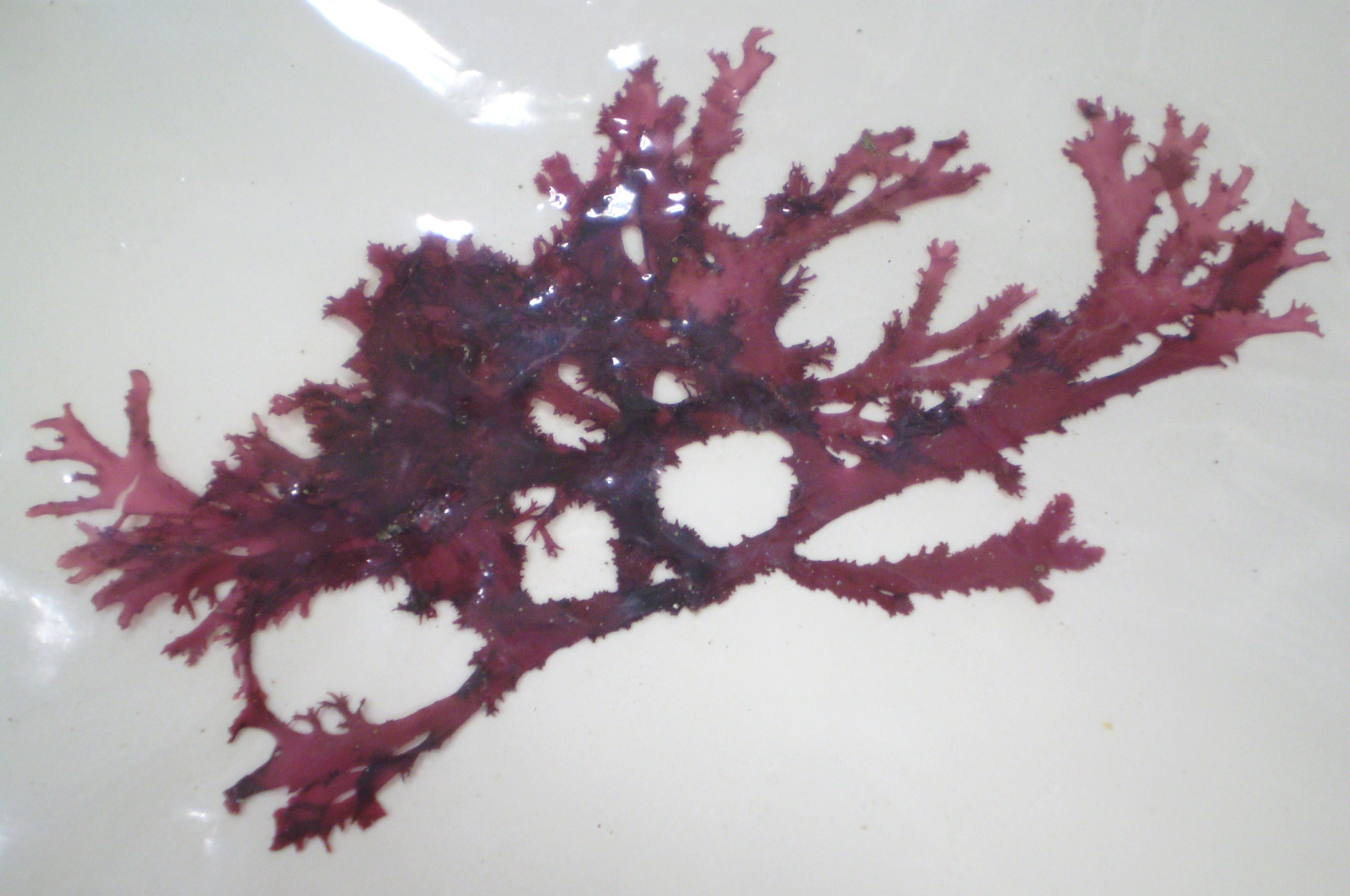
- Callophyllis japonica

Scientific classification
- Domain: Eukaryota
- Clade: Archaeplastida
- Division: Rhodophyta
- Class: Florideophyceae
- Subclass: Rhodymeniophycidae
- Order: Gigartinales; F.Schmitz

Families
- See text.

= Gigartinales =

Order of algae

Gigartinales is a red algae order in the class Florideophyceae.

== Systematics ==
- Family Acrotylaceae
  - Genus Acrotylus
  - Genus Amphiplexia
  - Genus Antrocentrum
  - Genus Binderella
  - Genus Claviclonium
  - Genus Hennedya
  - Genus Ranavalona
  - Genus Reinboldia
- Family Areschougiaceae
  - Genus Anatheca
  - Genus Areschougia
  - Genus Axosiphon
  - Genus Erythroclonium
  - Genus Meristiella
  - Genus Neoareschougia
  - Genus Notophycus
  - Genus Reticulobotrys
  - Genus Rhabdonia
  - Genus Thysanocladia
- Family Blinksiaceae
  - Genus Blinksia
- Family Calosiphoniaceae
  - Genus Bertholdia
  - Genus Calosiphonia
  - Genus Schmitzia
- Family Catenellopsidaceae
  - Genus Catenellopsis
- Family Caulacanthaceae
  - Genus Catenella
  - Genus Catenellocolax
  - Genus Caulacanthus
  - Genus Feldmannophycus
  - Genus Heringia
  - Genus Montemaria
  - Genus Sterrocladia
  - Genus Taylorophycus
- Family Chondriellaceae
  - Genus Chondriella
- Family Choreocolacaceae
  - Genus Leachiella
- Family Corynocystaceae
  - Genus Corynocystis
- Family Crossocarpaceae
  - Genus Crossocarpus
  - Genus Erythrophyllum
  - Genus Ionia
  - Genus Kallymeniopsis
  - Genus Velatocarpus
- Family Cruoriaceae
  - Genus Cruoria
  - Genus Erythroclathrus
- Family Cubiculosporaceae
  - Genus Cubiculosporum
- Family Cystocloniaceae
  - Genus Acanthococcus
  - Genus Austroclonium
  - Genus Bifida
  - Genus Calliblepharis
  - Genus Craspedocarpus
  - Genus Cystoclonium
  - Genus Dictyopsis
  - Genus Erythronaema
  - Genus Fimbrifolium
  - Genus Gloiophyllis
  - Genus Hypnea
  - Genus Hypneocolax
  - Genus Leptophyllium
  - Genus Peltasta
  - Genus Rhodophyllis
  - Genus Stictophyllum
  - Genus Stictosporum
- Family Dicranemataceae
  - Genus Dicranema
  - Genus Pinnatiphycus
  - Genus Reptataxis
  - Genus Tenaciphyllum
  - Genus Tylotus
- Family Dumontiaceae
  - Genus Andersoniella
  - Genus Borrichius
  - Genus Constantinea
  - Genus Cryptosiphonia
  - Genus Dasyphloea
  - Genus Dilsea
  - Genus Dudresnaya
  - Genus Dumontia
  - Genus Farlowia
  - Genus Gibsmithia
  - Genus Hyalosiphonia
  - Genus Kraftia
  - Genus Leptocladia
  - Genus Litharthron
  - Genus Masudaphycus
  - Genus Neodilsea
  - Genus Orculifilum
  - Genus Pikea
  - Genus Rhodopeltis
  - Genus Thuretellopsis
  - Genus Waernia
  - Genus Weeksia
- Family Endocladiaceae
  - Genus Acanthobolus
  - Genus Endocladia
  - Genus Gloiopeltis
- Family Furcellariaceae
  - Genus Fastigiaria
  - Genus Furcellaria
  - Genus Halarachnion
  - Genus Neurocaulon
  - Genus Opuntiella
  - Genus Turnerella
- Family Gainiaceae
  - Genus Gainia
- Family Gigartinaceae
  - Genus Chondracanthus
  - Genus Chondroclonium
  - Genus Chondrodictyon
  - Genus Chondrus
  - Genus Gigartina
  - Genus Iridaea
  - Genus Iridophycus
  - Genus Iridophycus
  - Genus Oncotylus
  - Genus Ostiophyllum
  - Genus Polymorpha
  - Genus Psilophycus
  - Genus Rhodoglossum
  - Genus Sarcothalia
- Family Gloiosiphoniaceae
  - Genus Baylesia
  - Genus Capillaria
  - Genus Gloeophycus
  - Genus Gloiosiphonia
  - Genus Peleophycus
  - Genus Plagiospora
  - Genus Rhododiscus
  - Genus Thuretella
- Family Haemeschariaceae
  - Genus Haemescharia
- Family Hypneaceae
- Family Kallymeniaceae
  - Genus Austrophyllis
  - Genus Austropugetia
  - Genus Beringia
  - Genus Callocolax
  - Genus Callophyllis
  - Genus Cirrulicarpus
  - Genus Crossocarpus
  - Genus Ectophora
  - Genus Erythrophyllum
  - Genus Euhymenia
  - Genus Euthora
  - Genus Glaphyrymenia
  - Genus Hommersandia
  - Genus Hormophora
  - Genus Ionia
  - Genus Kallymenia
  - Genus Kallymeniopsis
  - Genus Lecithites
  - Genus Leniea
  - Genus Meredithia
  - Genus Nereoginkgo
  - Genus Polycoelia
  - Genus Psaromenia
  - Genus Pugetia
  - Genus Rhizopogonia
  - Genus Rhodocladia
  - Genus Salishia
  - Genus Stauromenia
  - Genus Thamnophyllis
  - Genus Varimenia
  - Genus Velatocarpus
- Family Mychodeaceae
  - Genus Ectoclinium
  - Genus Mychodea
- Family Mychodeophyllaceae
  - Genus Mychodeophyllum
- Family Nizymeniaceae
  - Genus Amylophora
  - Genus Nizymenia
  - Genus Stenocladia
- Family Phacelocarpaceae
  - Genus Ctenodus
  - Genus Euctenodus
  - Genus Phacelocarpus
- Family Phyllophoraceae
  - Genus Actinococcus
  - Genus Ahnfeltiopsis
  - Genus Archestenogramma
  - Genus Besa
  - Genus Ceratocolax
  - Genus Coccotylus
  - Genus Epiphylla
  - Genus Erythrodermis
  - Genus Gymnogongrus
  - Genus Lukinia
  - Genus Mastocarpus
  - Genus Microgongrus
  - Genus Ozophora
  - Genus Pachycarpus
  - Genus Petrocelis
  - Genus Petroglossum
  - Genus Phyllophora
  - Genus Phyllotylus
  - Genus Prolifera
  - Genus Reingardia
  - Genus Schottera
  - Genus Stenogramma
- Family Polyidaceae
  - Genus Polyides
- Family Rhizophyllidaceae
  - Genus Chondrococcus
  - Genus Contarinia
  - Genus Nesophila
  - Genus Ochtodes
  - Genus Portieria
  - Genus Rhizophyllis
- Family Rissoellaceae
  - Genus Rissoella
- Family Schmiziellaceae
  - Genus Schmitziella
- Family Solieriaceae
  - Genus Agardhiella
  - Genus Betaphycus
  - Genus Eucheuma
  - Genus Euryomma
  - Genus Flahaultia
  - Genus Gardneriella
  - Genus Kappaphycus
  - Genus Melanema
  - Genus Meristotheca
  - Genus Neoagardhiella
  - Genus Placentophora
  - Genus Sarcodiotheca
  - Genus Sarconema
  - Genus Solieria
  - Genus Tikvahiella
  - Genus Wurdemannia
- Family Sphaerococcaceae
  - Genus Coronopifolia
  - Genus Rhynchococcus
  - Genus Sphaerococcus
- Family Tichocarpaceae
  - Genus Tichocarpus
