= Mazzaella =

Mazzaella may refer to:

- Mazzaella (alga), a genus of algae in the family Gigartinaceae
- Mazzaella (conodont), an extinct genus of ozarkodinid conodonts in the family Gondolellidae
