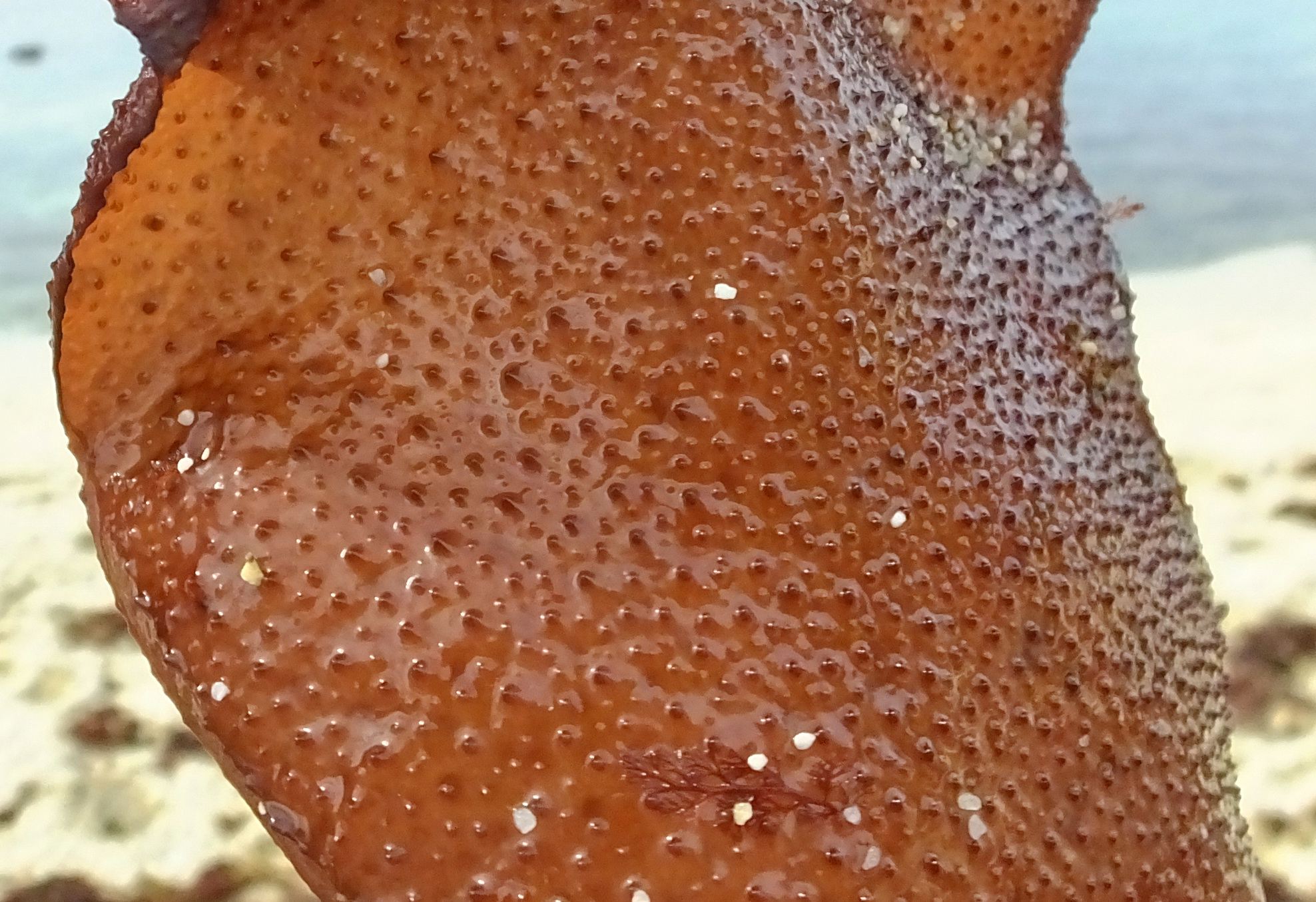
- Turkish towel

Scientific classification
- Domain: Eukaryota
- Clade: Archaeplastida
- Division: Rhodophyta
- Class: Florideophyceae
- Order: Gigartinales
- Family: Gigartinaceae
- Genus: Chondracanthus
- Species: C. exasperatus

Binomial name
- Chondracanthus exasperatus (Harvey & Bailey) Hughey 1996

Synonyms
- Chondracanthus binghamiae; Chondracanthus californicus; Gigartina binghamiae J. Agardh, 1899; Gigartina californica J. Agardh, 1899; Gigartina exasperata Harvey & Bailey 1851; Gigartina radula f. exasperata (Harvey & Bailey) Setchell & N.L.Gardner 1903

= Chondracanthus exasperatus =

Species of alga

Chondracanthus exasperatus, commonly called Turkish towel, is a species of seaweed in the family Gigartinaceae. The specific epithet exasperatus (lit. 'roughened') refers to the bumpy texture of the blades (leaf-like structures). This texture also leads to the common name which evokes the luxurious feel of a towel from a Turkish bathhouse. The rough, papillae-strewn blade surface even makes it difficult to measure the temperature using infrared thermometers.

== Description ==
It is a perennial species. Like many species in Gigartinaceae, the appearance of C. exasperatus can vary depending upon grown conditions. It can be confused with Chondracanthus spinosus and Gigartina binghamiae, and it might take RFLP analysis to be sure of the species. In addition, the names of the species in the genera Gigartina and Chondracanthus have been adjusted several times since 1961. It is also similar to Mastocarpus species, known as Turkish washcloths, but is smaller, with branched blades. The leaf margins of the blades are smooth in cooler water and then become toothed and jagged as the temperature increases. In more exposed areas, the blades are thicker. Increased water velocity will cause the blades to change shape. The color of the thallus is greenish when exposed to ultraviolet light, but when it grows in deeper water it is darker red to purple. Though it prefers lower water temperatures it can grow at 25 °C, but ends up dark red to black in color and having flat or cylindrical branch clusters.

As originally described, C. exasperatus has a leafy stipe, with large 2–3 feet (0.61–0.91 m) long leathery-membranaceous blades that are lanceolate and simple. The blade, and the majority of the thallus, is purplish-red. Blade margins are thick, with rounded teeth, and appendiculate. The thallus has simple, ramenta-like spiny projections (papillae) thickly strewn on both sides. Coccoid pedicels are in marginal spines emerging from the thallus.

C. exasperatus grows the fastest in the summer and slowest near the winter solstice. Thalli have a moisture content of about 81.4% and protein content of 1.59-1.97%.

== Distribution and habitat ==
C. exasperatus is found on the Pacific coast of North America from Baja California north to Sitka Sound. The type locality is in Puget Sound opposite Fort Nisqually. It grows on rocks in semi-exposed or semi-protected areas of the upper subtidal to lower intertidal zone, down to a depth of 20m.

== Ecology ==
Proliferation of invasive species such as Mazzaella japonica have a negative impact on the growth of C. exasperatus. C. exasperatus is also susceptible to infection by the parasitic oomycete Pythium marinum.

C. exasperatus decomposes quickly, faster than most other species, indicating its importance to detritivores and to nutrient cycling. The high rate of decomposition also means that it is harder to find washed ashore as wrack and that its importance in the ecosystem may be underrepresented in research.

However, amphipods such as Megalorchestia californiana and Traskorchestia spp. (including Traskorchestia traskiana) will avoid C. exasperatus. The isopod Ligia pallasii and the green sea urchin (Strongylocentrotus droebachiensis) also seems to prefer to eat other seaweed species. A diet of C. exasperatus can slow or decrease shell length in juvenile white abalone (Haliotis sorenseni) at extreme water temperatures, and possibly can be deadly at 18 °C or above raising concerns related to global warming.

== Use by humans ==
Commercial aquaculture in both tanks and on nets of C. exasperatus was attempted as early as the 1970s in Washington state. It can also be grown in the air if sprayed with sea water, which conserves water but risks losing the crop if the pumps fail. The gel within the blades has also been harvested to make cosmetics. Intact blades are used in baths or for thalassotherapy, along with species such as feather boa (Egregia menziesii), finger kelp (Laminaria digitata), and Fucus.

== Gallery ==
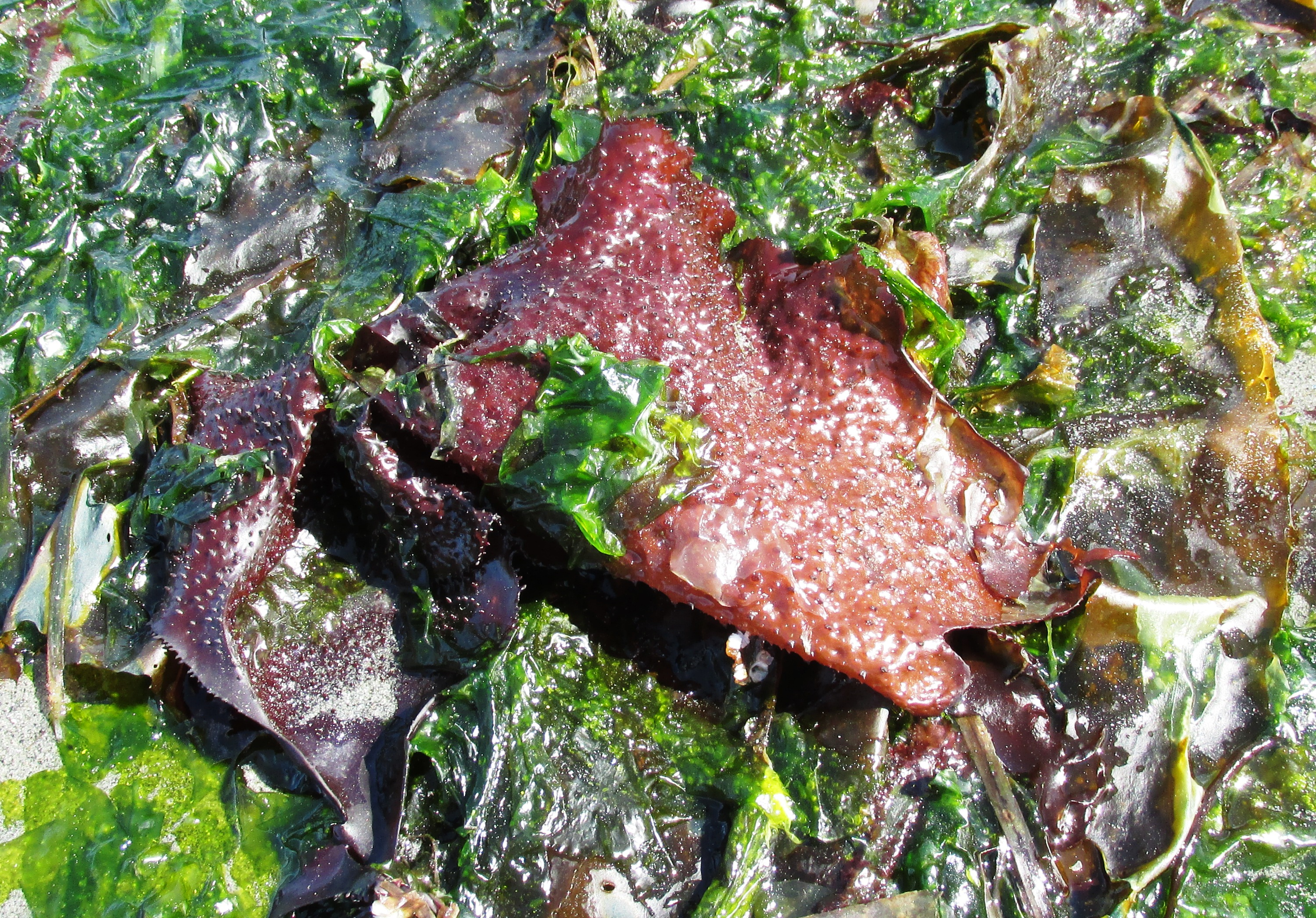
In Golden Gardens Park

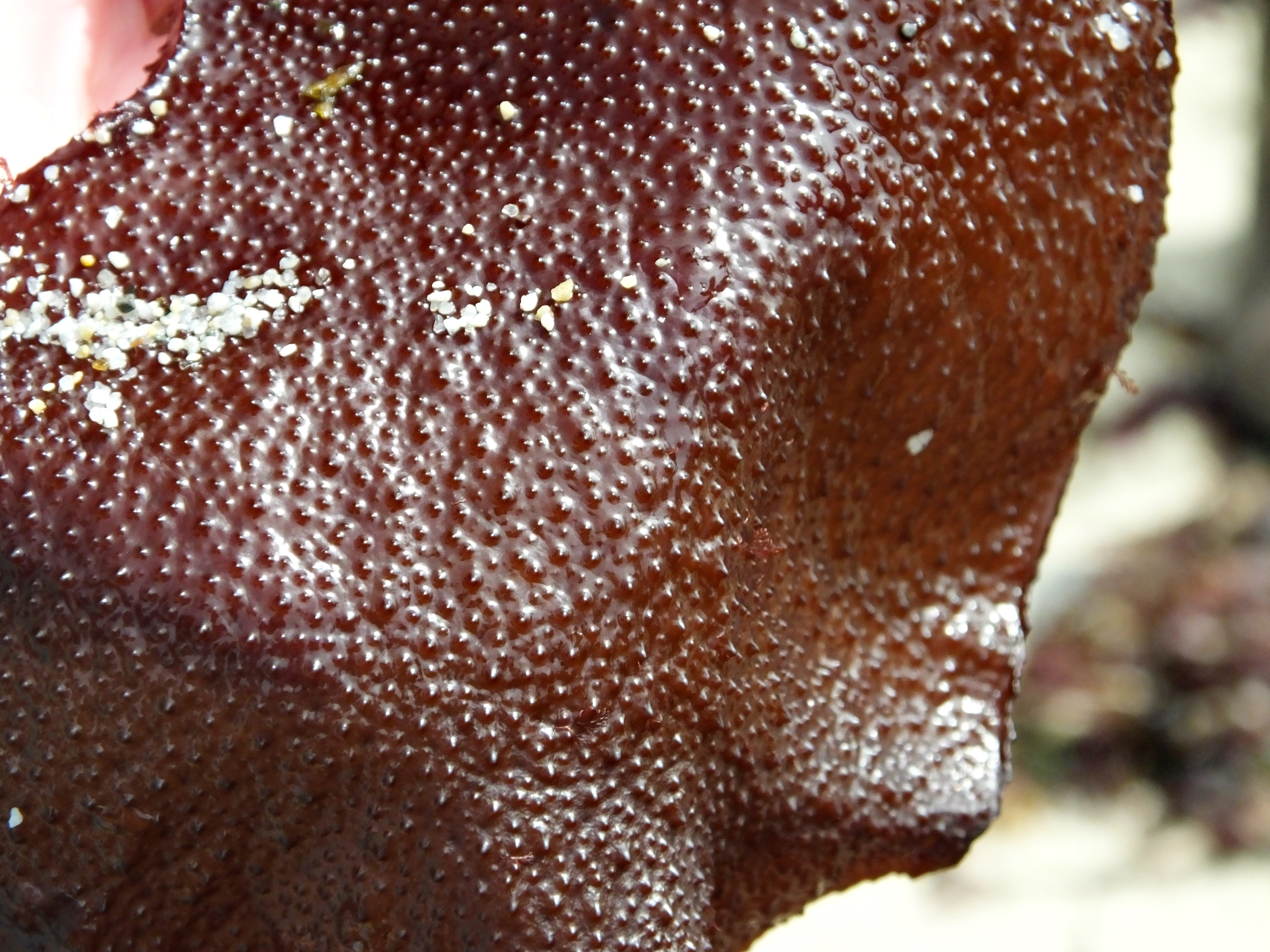
At Fitzgerald Marine Reserve
