= C. exasperatus =

C. exasperatus may refer to a few different species. The specific epithet exasperatus means 'roughened.'

- Callinectes exasperatus, a crab in the family Portunidae
- Campylopus exasperatus, a moss in the family Dicranaceae
- Cantharidus exasperatus, a sea snail in the family Trochidae
- Carabus exasperatus, a beetle in the family Carabidae
- Centropogon exasperatus, a plant in the family Campanulaceae
- Chiton exasperatus, a marine mollusk in the family Chitonidae
- Chondracanthus exasperatus, a seaweed in the family Gigartinaceae
- Clavus exasperatus, a sea snail in the family Drilliidae
- Coccotrypes exasperatus, a bark beetle in the family Curculionidae
- Colostethus exasperatus, a synonym for Hyloxalus exasperatus, a frog in the family Dendrobatidae
- Conotrachelodes exasperatus, a weevil in the family Curculionidae
- Conotrachelus exasperatus, a weevil in the family Curculionidae
- Cryptorhynchus exasperatus, a weevil in the family Curculionidae
