= Chondracanthus elegans =

Scientific classification
- Domain: Eukaryota
- Clade: Archaeplastida
- Division: Rhodophyta
- Class: Florideophyceae
- Order: Gigartinales
- Family: Gigartinaceae
- Genus: Chondracanthus
- Species: C. elegans

Binomial name
- Chondracanthus elegans (Greville) Guiry 1993

Synonyms
- Gigartina elegans Greville 1833

Species of alga

Chondracanthus elegans is a red algae species in the genus Chondracanthus. The name elegans is Latin for 'elegant.'
