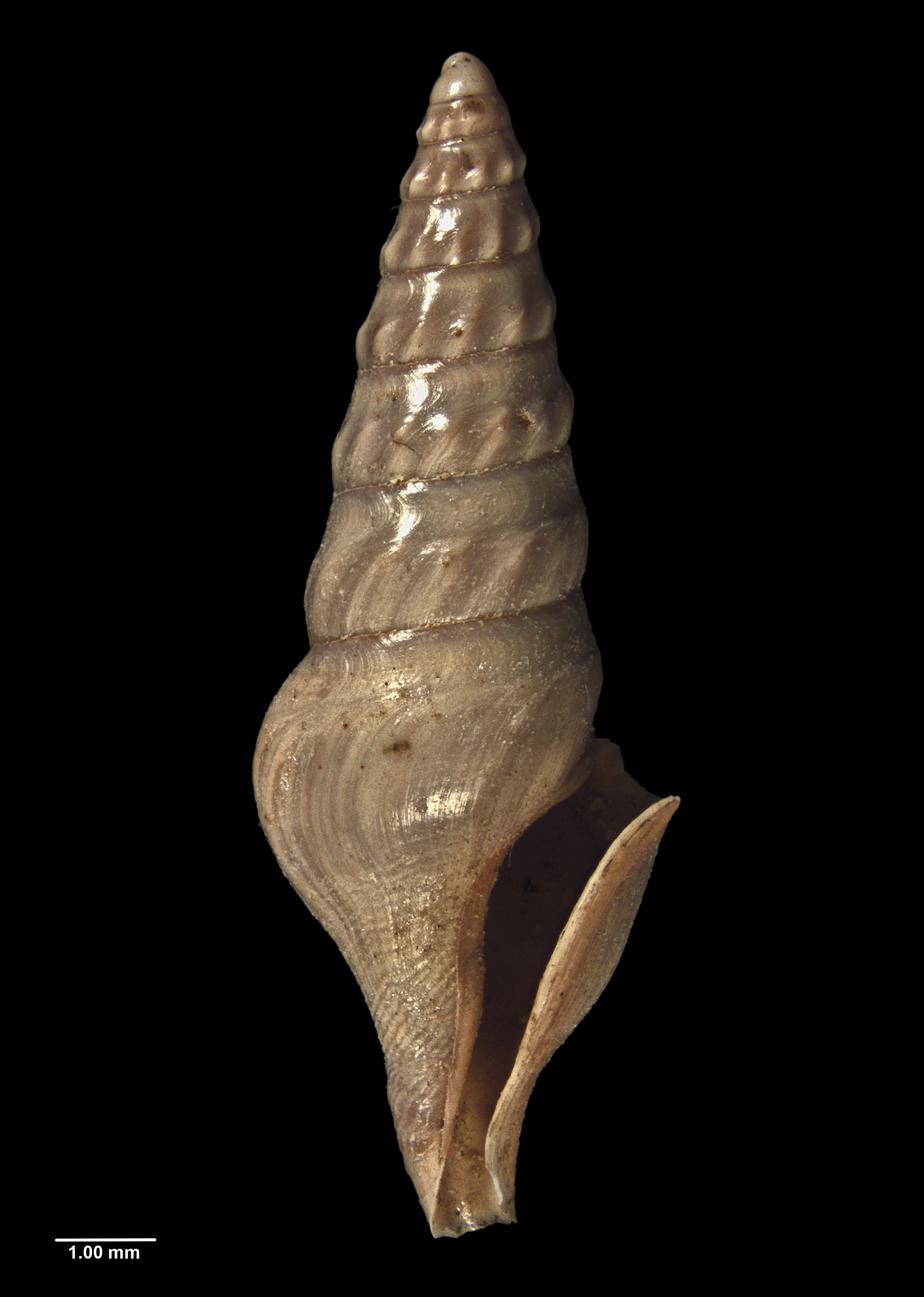
- Austroclavus glaber

Scientific classification
- Kingdom: Animalia
- Phylum: Mollusca
- Class: Gastropoda
- Subclass: Caenogastropoda
- Order: Neogastropoda
- Superfamily: Conoidea
- Family: incertae sedis
- Genus: †Austroclavus; Powell, 1942

Type species
- † Drillia tenuispiralis P. Marshall, 1918

= Austroclavus =

Genus of gastropods

Austroclavus is a genus of sea snails, marine gastropod mollusks, unassigned to a family within the superfamily Conoidea.

== Taxonomy ==
The genus was first described by A. W. B. Powell in 1942, who named Drillia tenuispiralis (current name Austroclavus tenuispiralis) as the type species.

== Species ==
Species within the genus Austroclavus include:

- † Austroclavus awakinoensis Powell, 1942
- † Austroclavus clifdenensis Powell, 1942
- † Austroclavus famelicus (Marwick, 1931)
- † Austroclavus finlayi Powell, 1942
- † Austroclavus glaber Powell, 1944
- † Austroclavus kaipara (Laws, 1939)
- † Austroclavus marshalli Powell, 1942
- † Austroclavus nitens (P. Marshall, 1918)
- † Austroclavus nodulatus Laws, 1948
- † Austroclavus tenuispiralis (P. Marshall, 1918)
- Austroclavus undatus (Hedley, 1907)

Species brought into synonymy

- Austroclavus aeneus (Hedley, 1922): synonym of Antiguraleus aeneus (Hedley, 1922)
- † Austroclavus brevicaudalis A. W. B. Powell, 1944: synonym of Austroclavus glaber A. W. B. Powell, 1944
- Austroclavus exasperatus (Reeve, 1843): synonym of Clavus exasperatus (Reeve, 1843)
- † Austroclavus lygdinopsis A. W. B. Powell, 1944: synonym of Austroclavus glaber A. W. B. Powell, 1944
- † Austroclavus teres A. W. B. Powell, 1944: synonym of Austroclavus glaber A. W. B. Powell, 1944

== Gallery ==
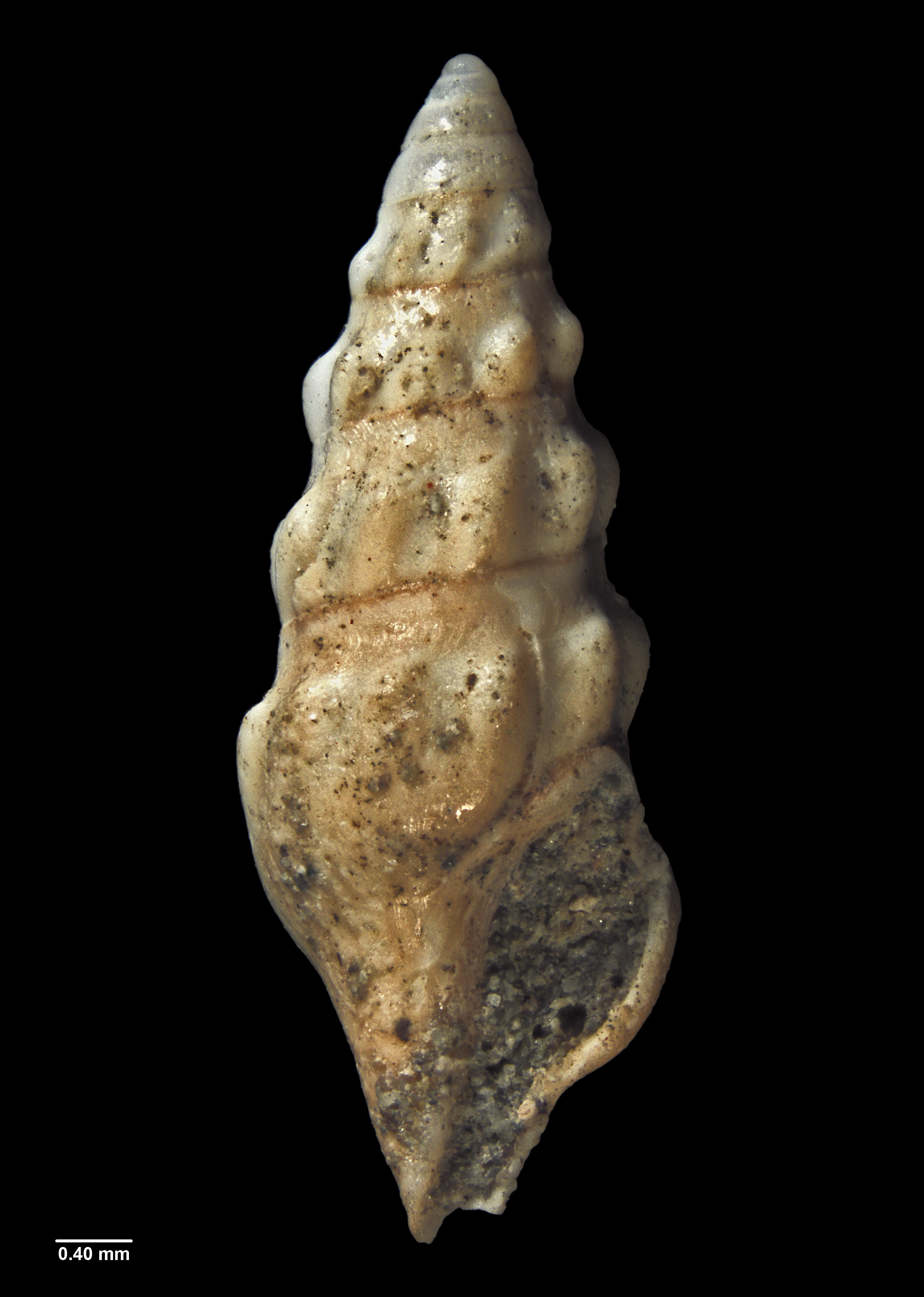
Austroclavus awakinoensis

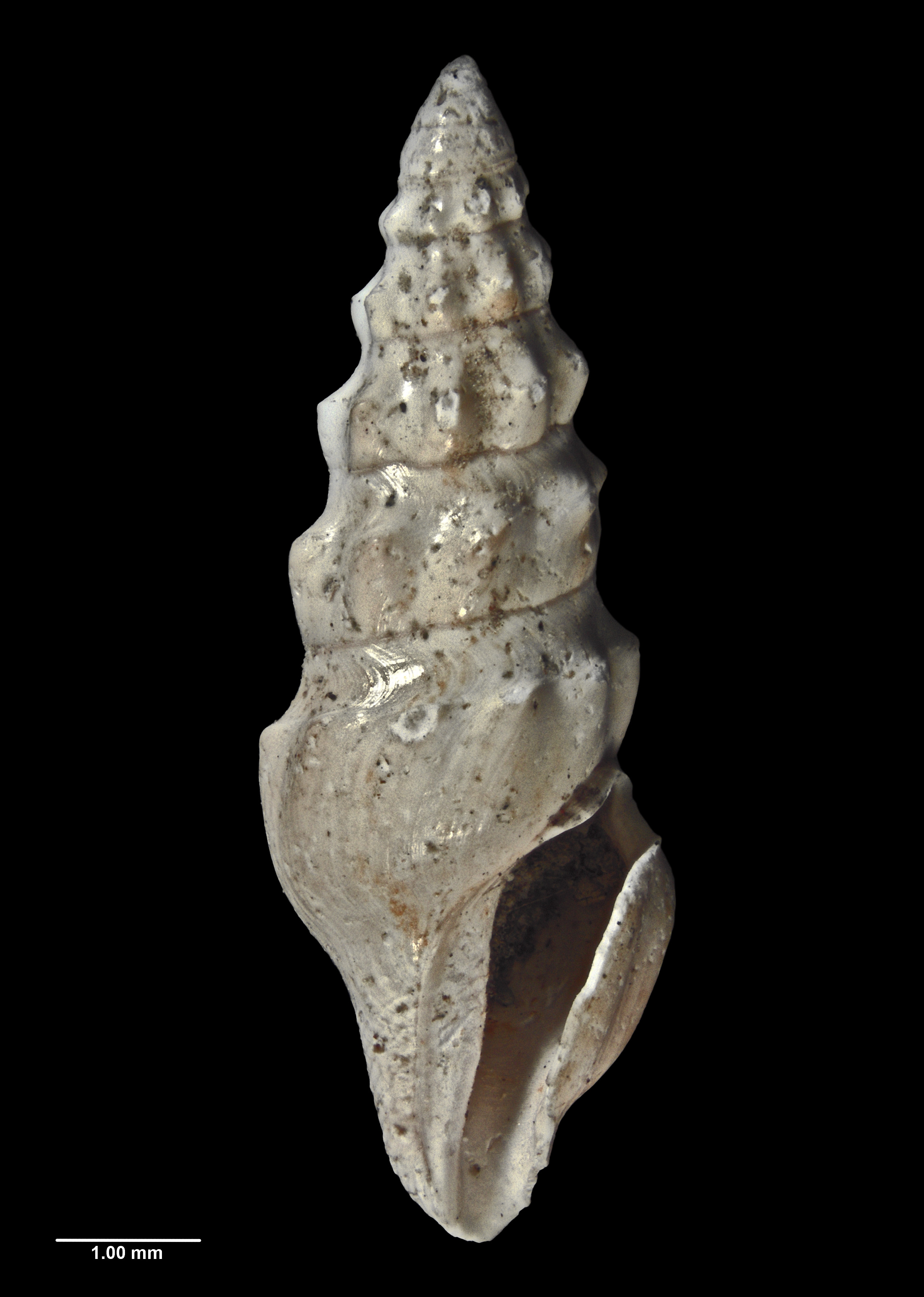
Austroclavus clifdenensis

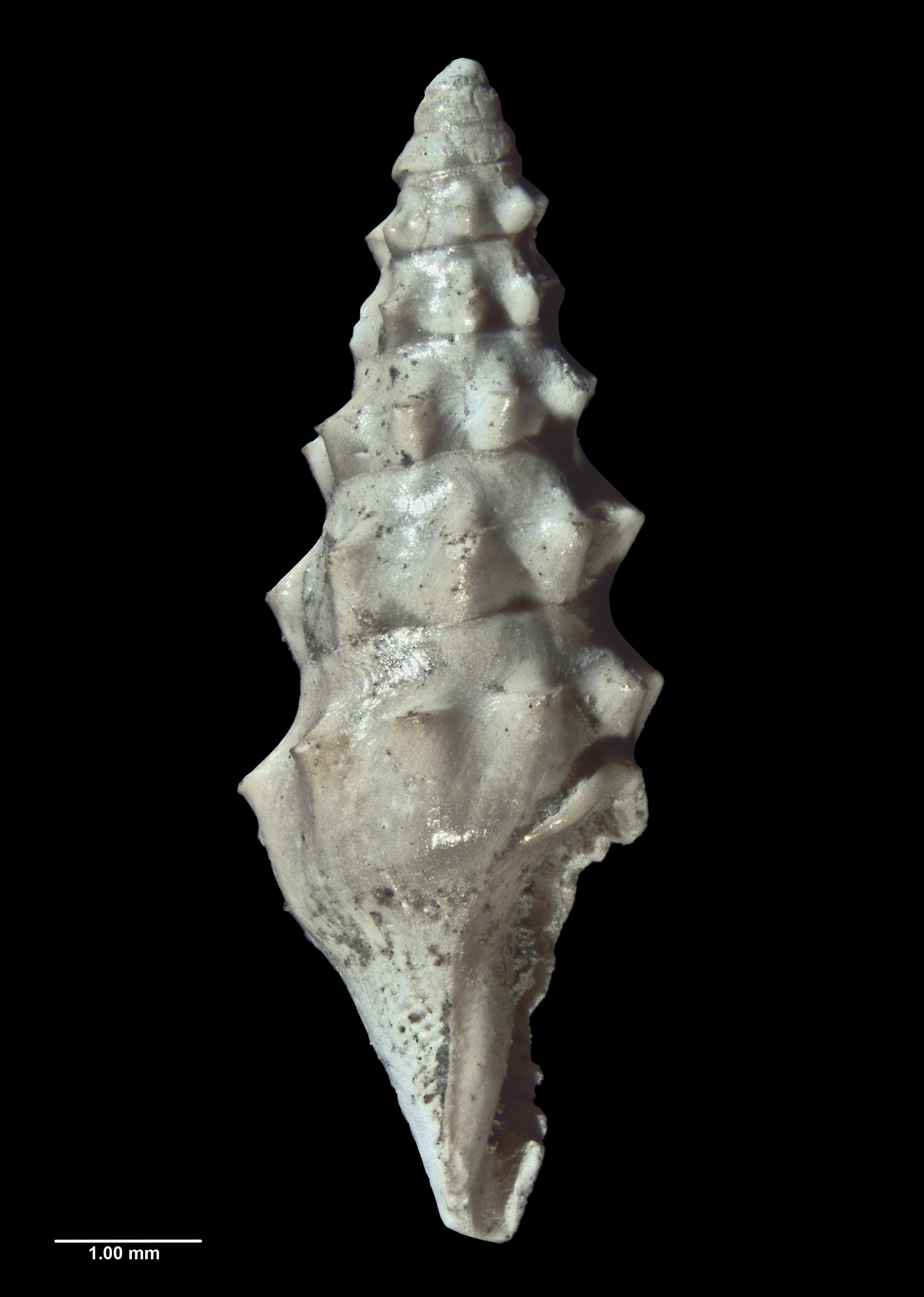
Austroclavus finlayi

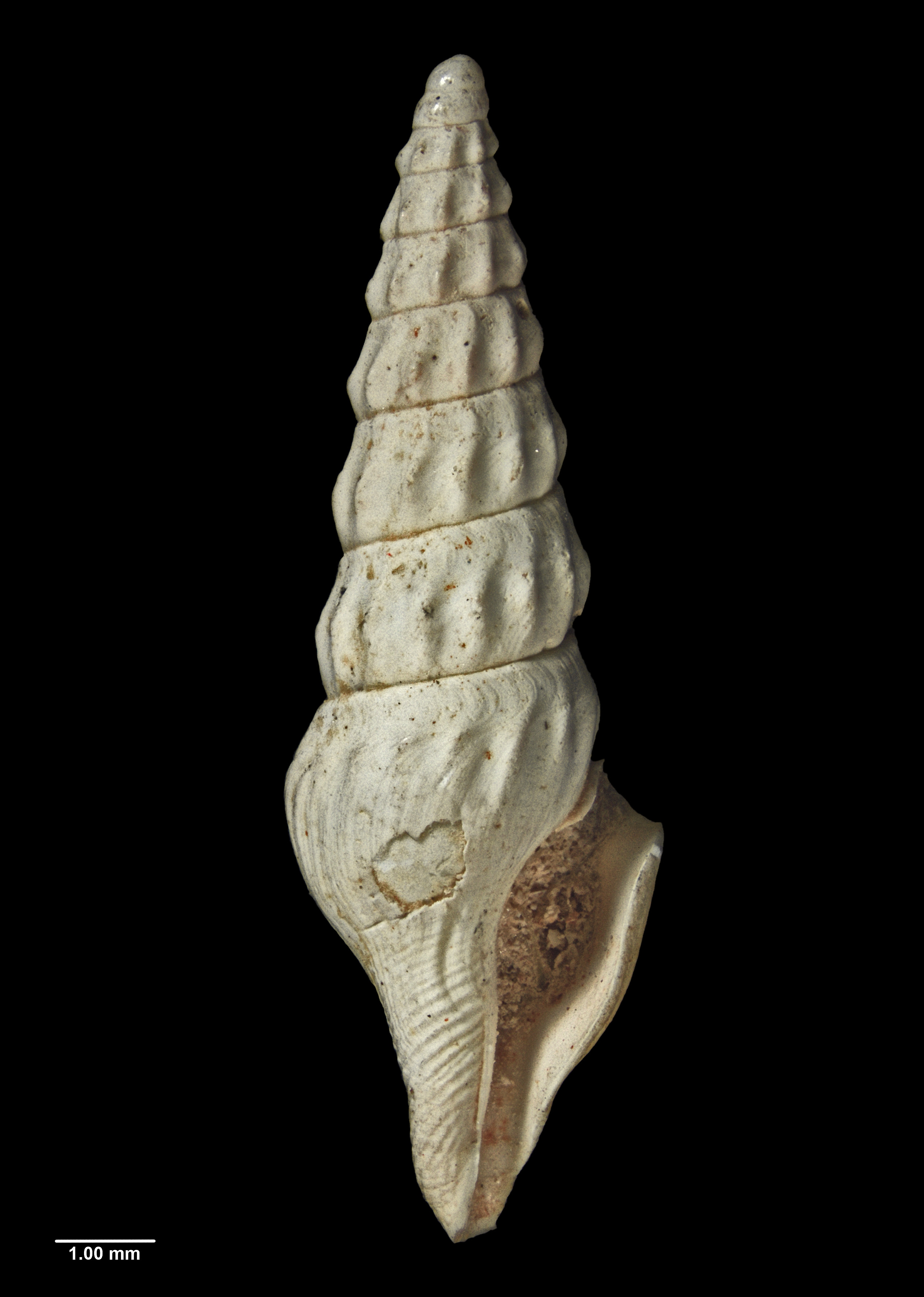
Austroclavus glaber

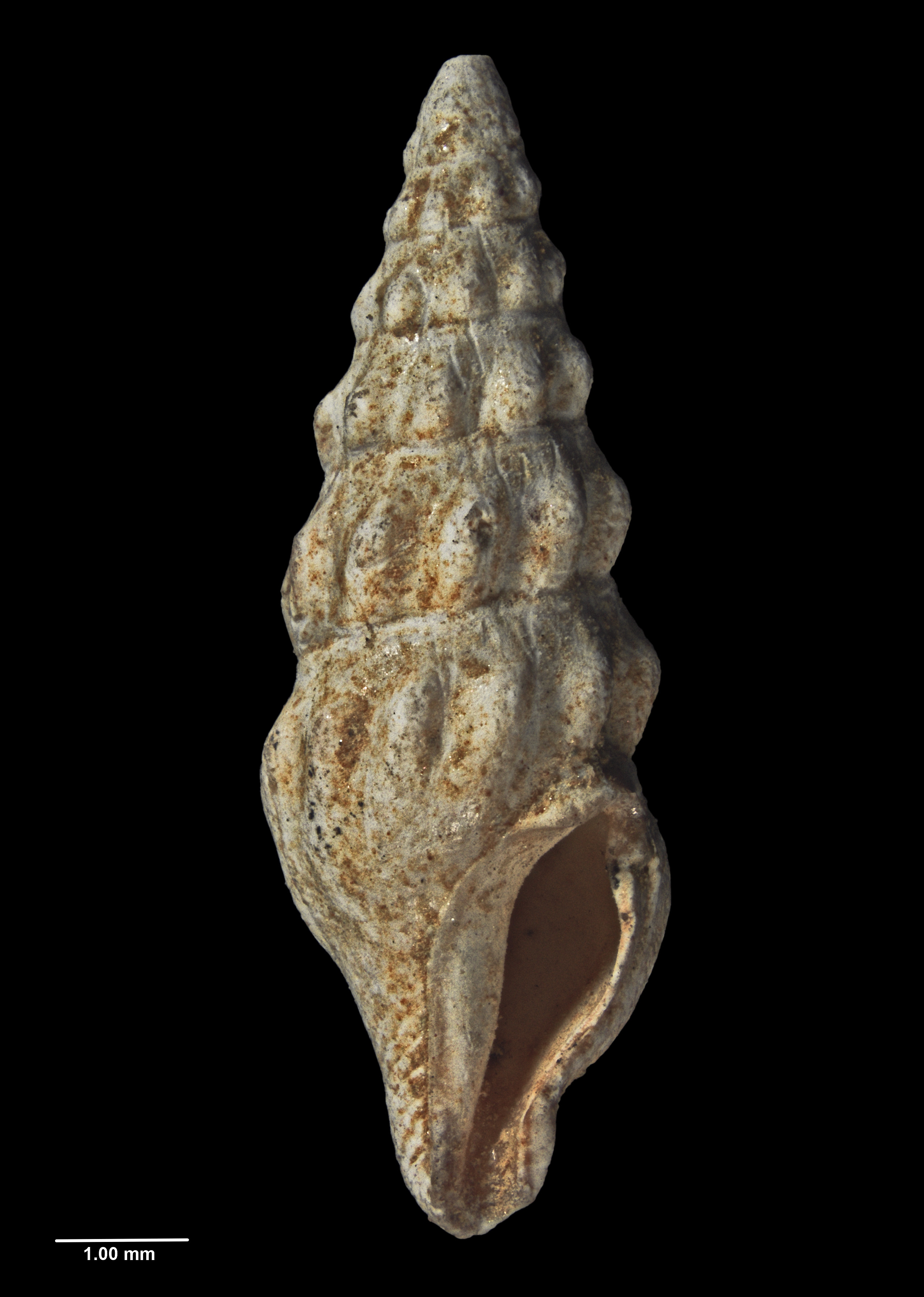
Austroclavus marshalli
