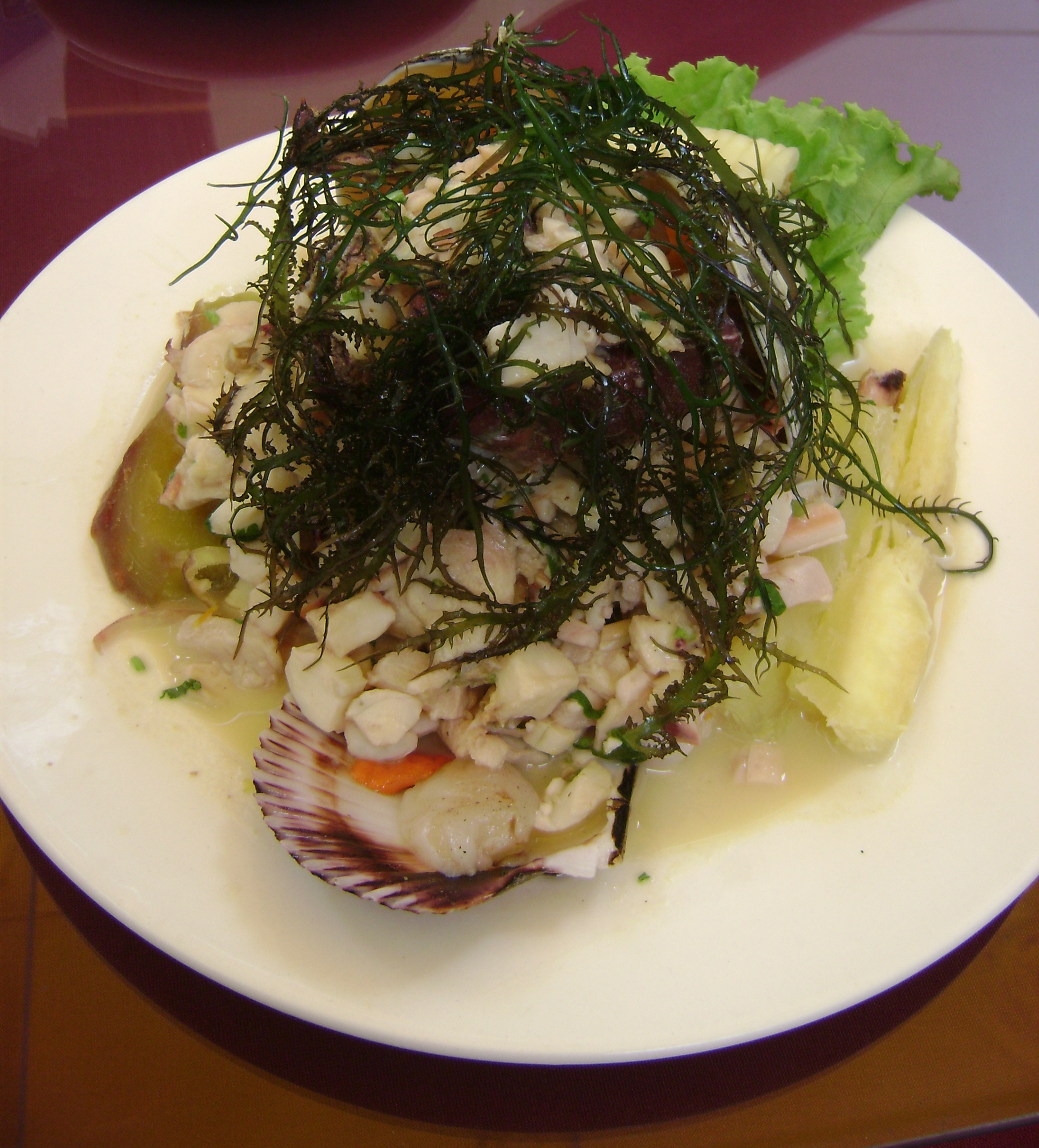

Scientific classification
- Domain: Eukaryota
- Clade: Archaeplastida
- Division: Rhodophyta
- Class: Florideophyceae
- Order: Gigartinales
- Family: Gigartinaceae
- Genus: Chondracanthus
- Species: C. chamissoi

Binomial name
- Chondracanthus chamissoi (C. Agardh) Kützing,

Synonyms
- Sphaerococcus chamissoi C. Agardh

= Chondracanthus chamissoi =

Species of alga

Chondracanthus chamissoi, commonly referred to as sea chicory, is a red algae species in the genus Chondracanthus. It is edible and has been consumed by Peruvians and Chileans since Pre-Hispanic times.
