= Austroclavus undatus =

Scientific classification
- Kingdom: Animalia
- Phylum: Mollusca
- Class: Gastropoda
- Subclass: Caenogastropoda
- Order: Neogastropoda
- Family: incertae sedis
- Genus: †Austroclavus
- Species: †A. undatus

Binomial name
- †Austroclavus undatus (Hedley, 1907)

Synonyms
- Austroclavus undatus auct.; Aspella undata Hedley, 1907; Clavus undatus (Hedley, 1907)

Species of gastropod

Austroclavus undatus is a species of sea snail, a marine gastropod mollusc in the superfamily Conoidea, unassigned to a family.

== Distribution ==
This marine species is endemic to Australia and occurs off New South Wales and Western Australia
