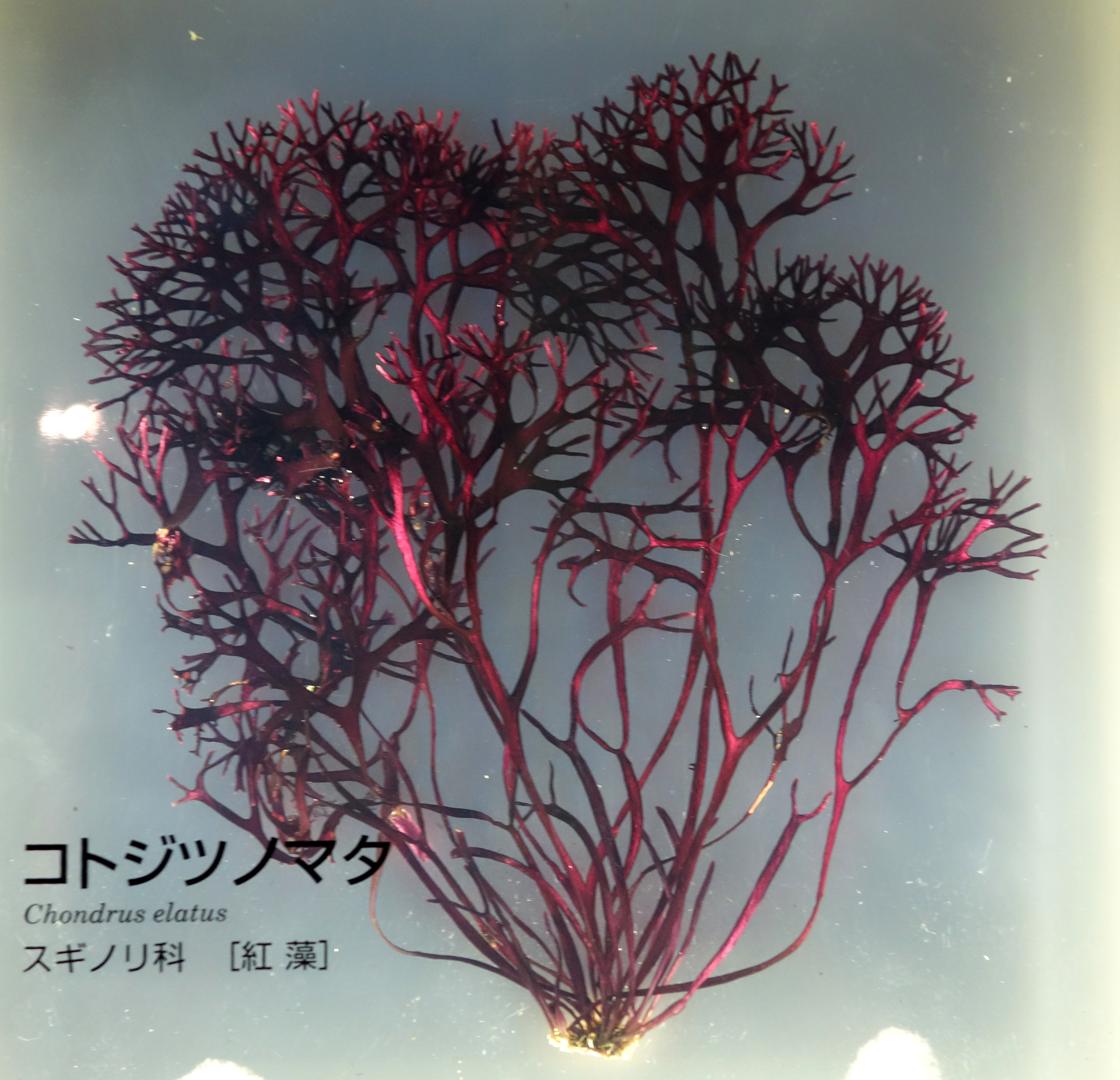
- Chondrus elatus

Scientific classification
- Clade: Archaeplastida
- Division: Rhodophyta
- Class: Florideophyceae
- Order: Gigartinales
- Family: Gigartinaceae
- Genus: Chondrus; Stackhouse [1797]

= Chondrus =

Genus of algae

Chondrus is a genus of red algae containing 11 accepted species:

- Chondrus armatus (Harvey) Okamura
- Chondrus canaliculatus (C.Agardh) Greville
- Chondrus crispus Stackhouse
- Chondrus elatus Holmes
- Chondrus giganteus Yendo
- Chondrus ocellatus Holmes
- Chondrus pinnulatus (Harvey) Okamura
- Chondrus uncialis Harvey & Bailey
- Chondrus verrucosus Mikami
- Chondrus yendoi Yamada & Mikami

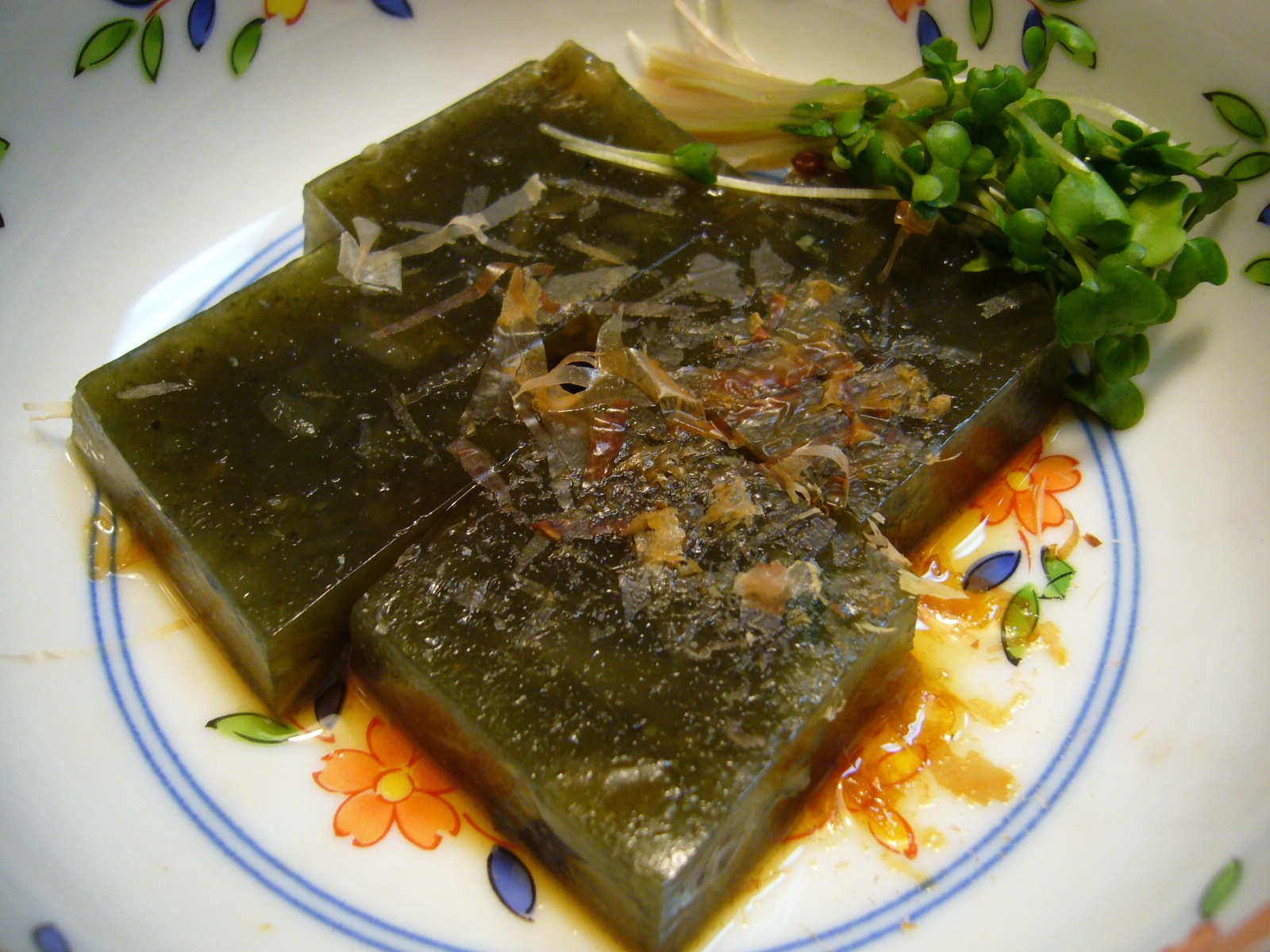
Japanese kaisō, a jelly-like food made from Chondrus elatus
