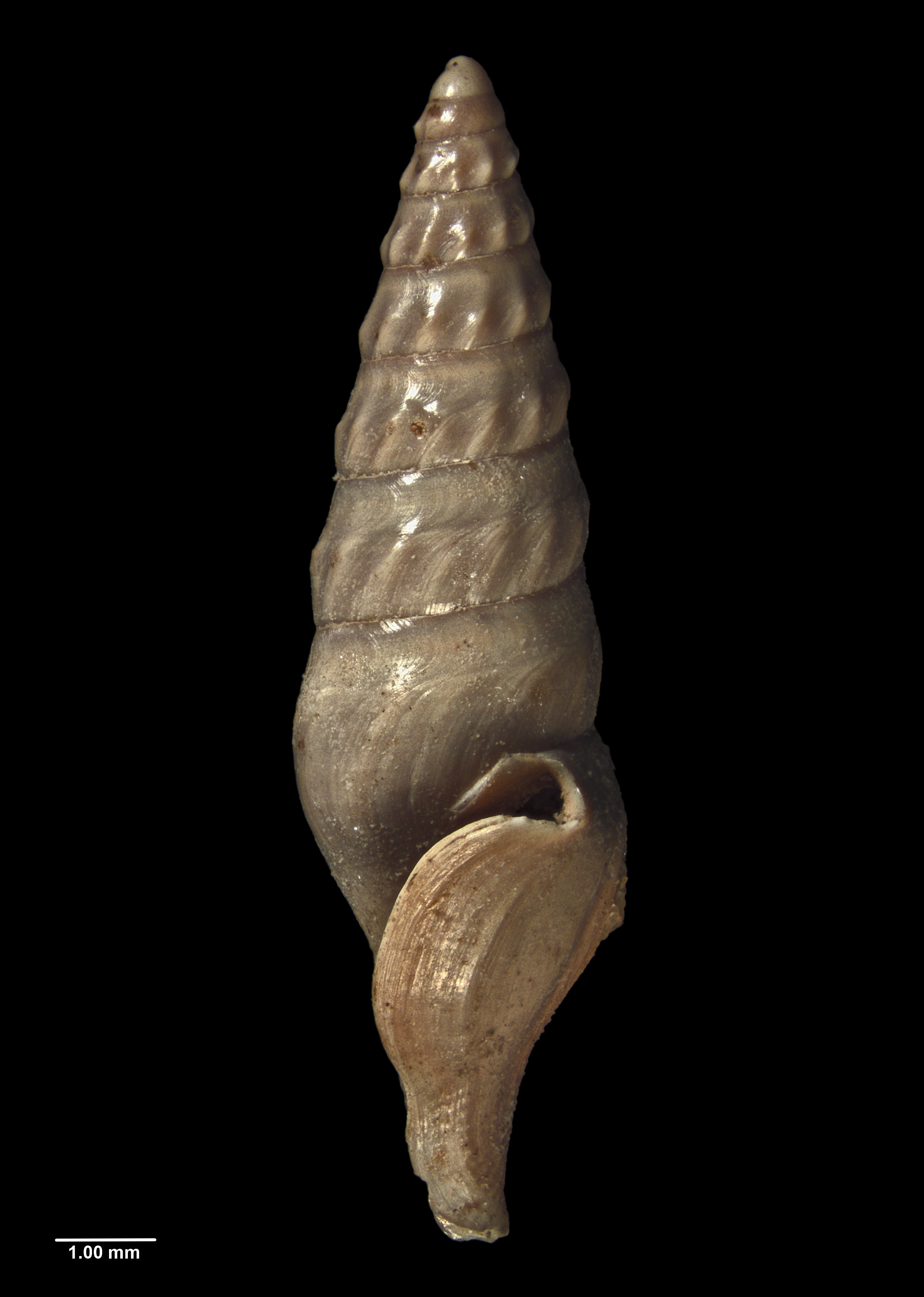
- Holotype from Auckland War Memorial Museum

Scientific classification
- Kingdom: Animalia
- Phylum: Mollusca
- Class: Gastropoda
- Subclass: Caenogastropoda
- Order: Neogastropoda
- Family: incertae sedis
- Genus: †Austroclavus
- Species: †A. glaber

Binomial name
- †Austroclavus glaber Powell, 1944

Synonyms
- † Austroclavus brevicaudalis A. W. B. Powell, 1944; † Austroclavus lygdinopsis A. W. B. Powell, 1944; † Austroclavus teres A. W. B. Powell, 1944

= Austroclavus glaber =

Austroclavus glaber Temporal range: middle Miocene

Extinct species of gastropod

Austroclavus glaber is an extinct species of sea snail, a marine gastropod mollusc in the superfamily Conoidea, currently not assigned to a family. Fossils of the species date to the middle Miocene, and have been found in the strata of the Otway Basin and Port Phillip Basin of Victoria, Australia.

== Description ==
In the original description, Powell described the species as follows:

Slender, attenuated spired, smooth and polished; whorls weakly angulate above the middle. Protoconch smooth, conical, of 2½ whorls, with a small tip, ending abruptly in a thin "Sinusigera" varix. Post-nuclear sculpture of weak, very oblique, axial folds, 13 per whorl, strongest on the early whorls and obsolete after the fifth whorl. Spiral sculpture restricted to about 24 weak threads on the anterior canal. Outer lip tilted forwards in an arcuate sweep, deeply excavated above by the rounded shoulder sinus and indented below by a pronounced "Stromboid"-notch. There is a strong parietal callus-pad. Canal moderately long, unnotched.

The holotype of the species measures 12.25 mm (0.482 in) in height and 4.6 mm (0.18 in) in diameter.

== Taxonomy ==
The species was first described by A.W.B. Powell in 1944. The holotype was collected from Fossil Beach, Balcombe Bay, Victoria, Australia, at an unknown date prior to 1944, and is held by the Auckland War Memorial Museum. In 2024, Thomas A. Darragh synonymised A. brevicaudalis, A. lygdinopsis and A. teres with A. glaber, as junior subjective synonyms.

== Distribution ==
This extinct marine species dates to the middle Miocene, and occurs in the strata of the Otway Basin of South Australia and Victoria, and the Port Phillip Basin of Victoria, including the Muddy Creek Formation, Gellibrand Formation.

== Gallery ==
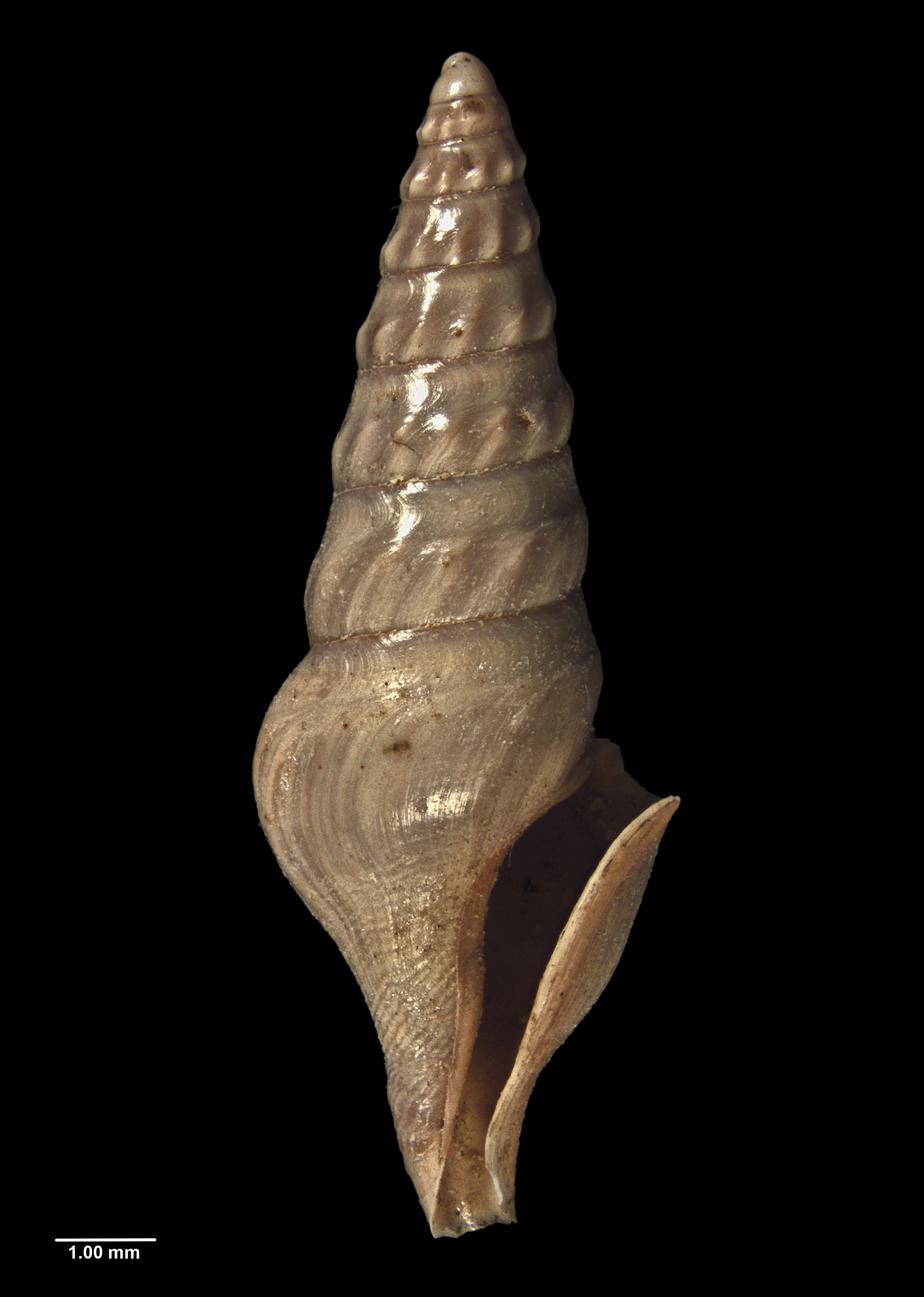
Side view of holotype

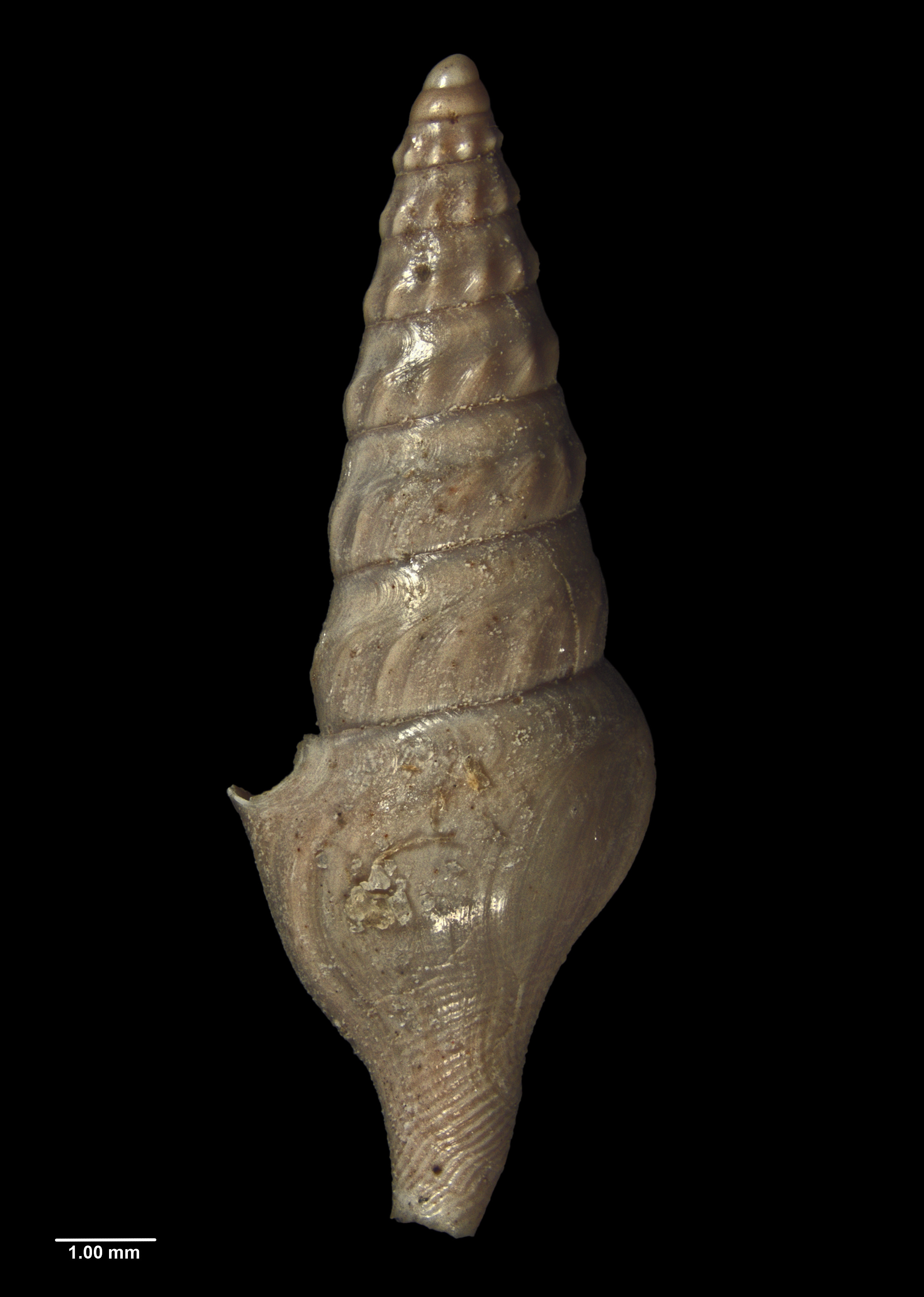
Reverse view of holotype

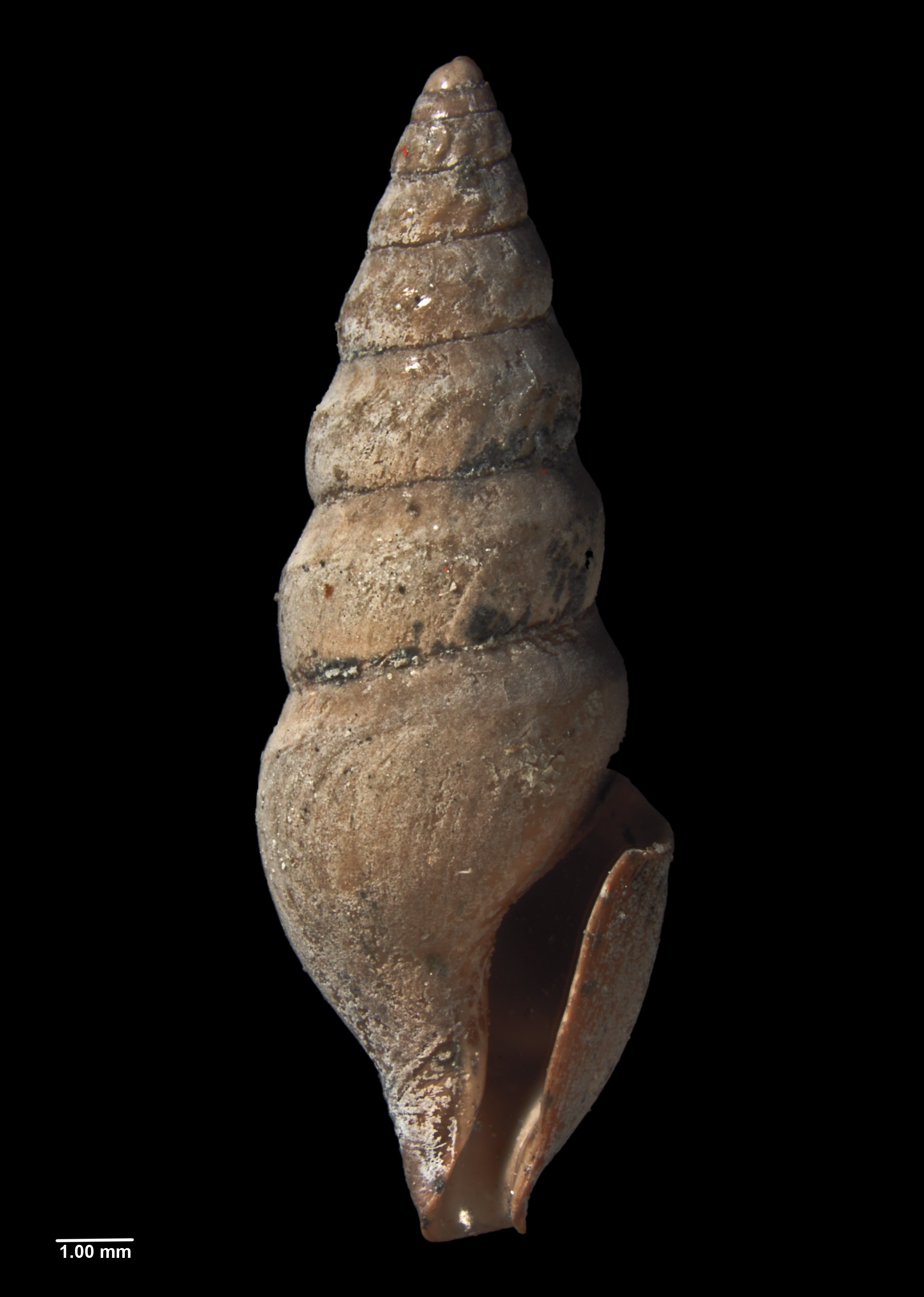
Type specimen (holotype of A. brevicaudalis)

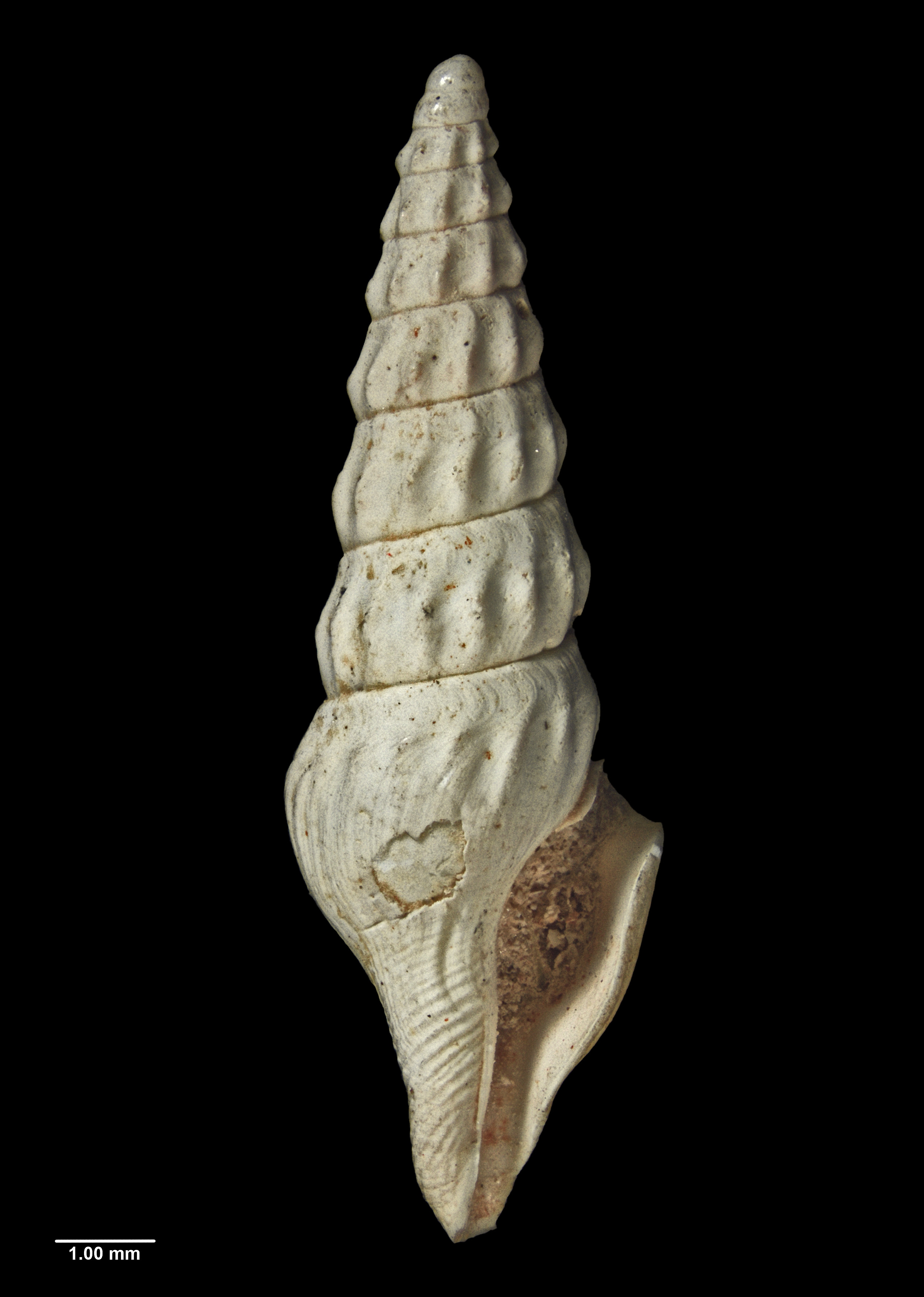
Type specimen (holotype of A. lygdinopsis)

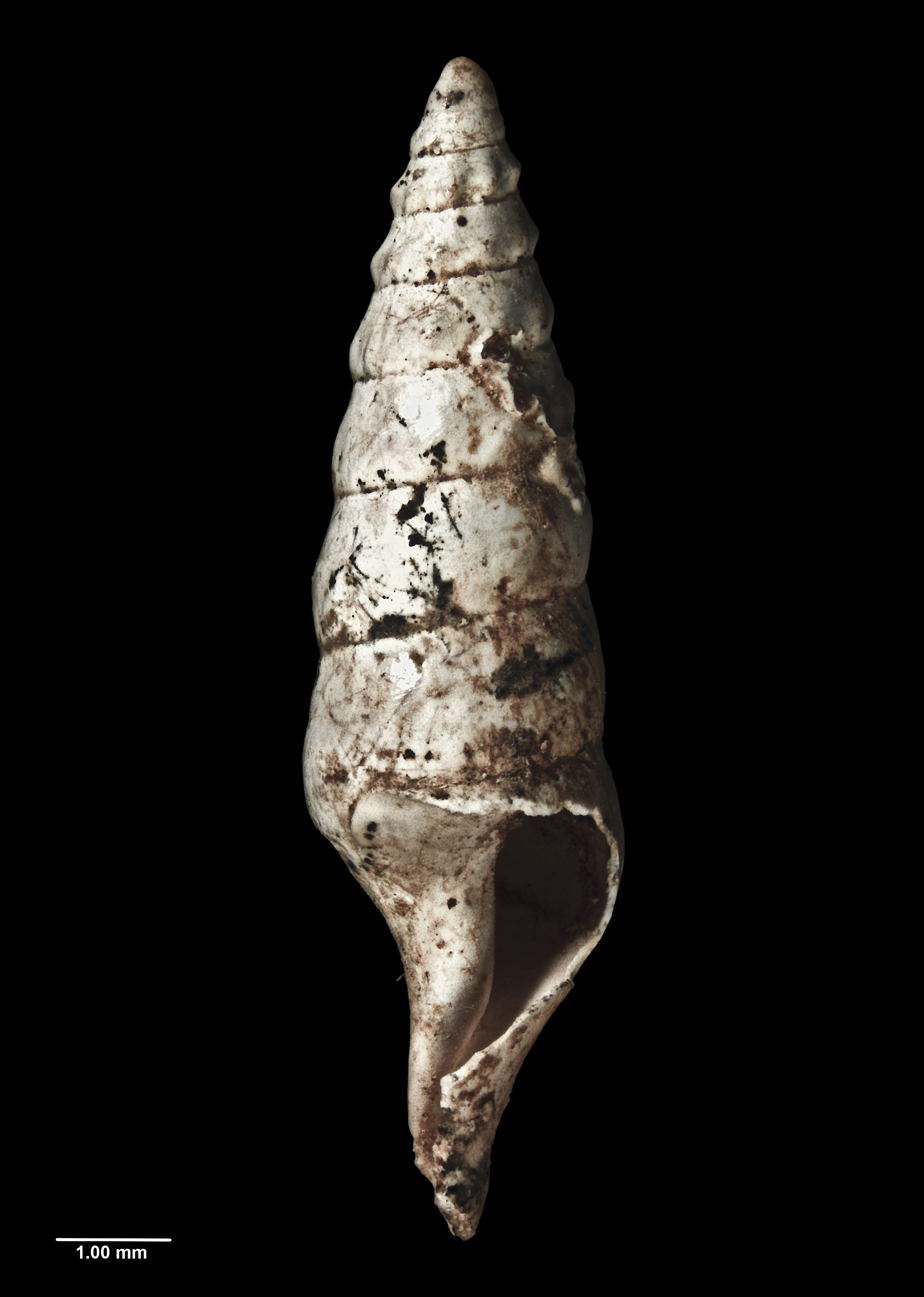
Type specimen (holotype of A. teres)
