= Carrageen pudding =

Milk-based dessert from Scotland and Ireland

- Type: Dessert
- Place of origin: Scotland, Ireland
- Region or state: Europe
- Main ingredients: Milk, red algae

Carrageen pudding or carrageen moss pudding (Scottish Gaelic: carran, pronounced [ˈkʰarˠan]) is a milk-based dessert akin to blancmange, eaten in coastal areas of Scotland (particularly the Outer Hebrides) and Ireland.

== History ==
Chondrus crispus, or carrageen moss, a type of red algae widely found on the coasts of these countries, is added to boiled milk as a thickening agent and simmered until the mixture becomes gelatinous. The moss is a source of carrageenan. The pudding is often eaten with sugar and sometimes eggs, cream, lemon, vanilla or whisky.

Carrageen pudding is traditionally considered to have medicinal value, being given to people suffering from bronchitis.

Myrtle Allen is credited with making the pudding famous in Ireland by including it on the menu at her restaurant at Ballymaloe House. Florence Irwin's 1949 The Cookin' Woman: Irish Country Recipes includes a recipe for the pudding from Donegal.
