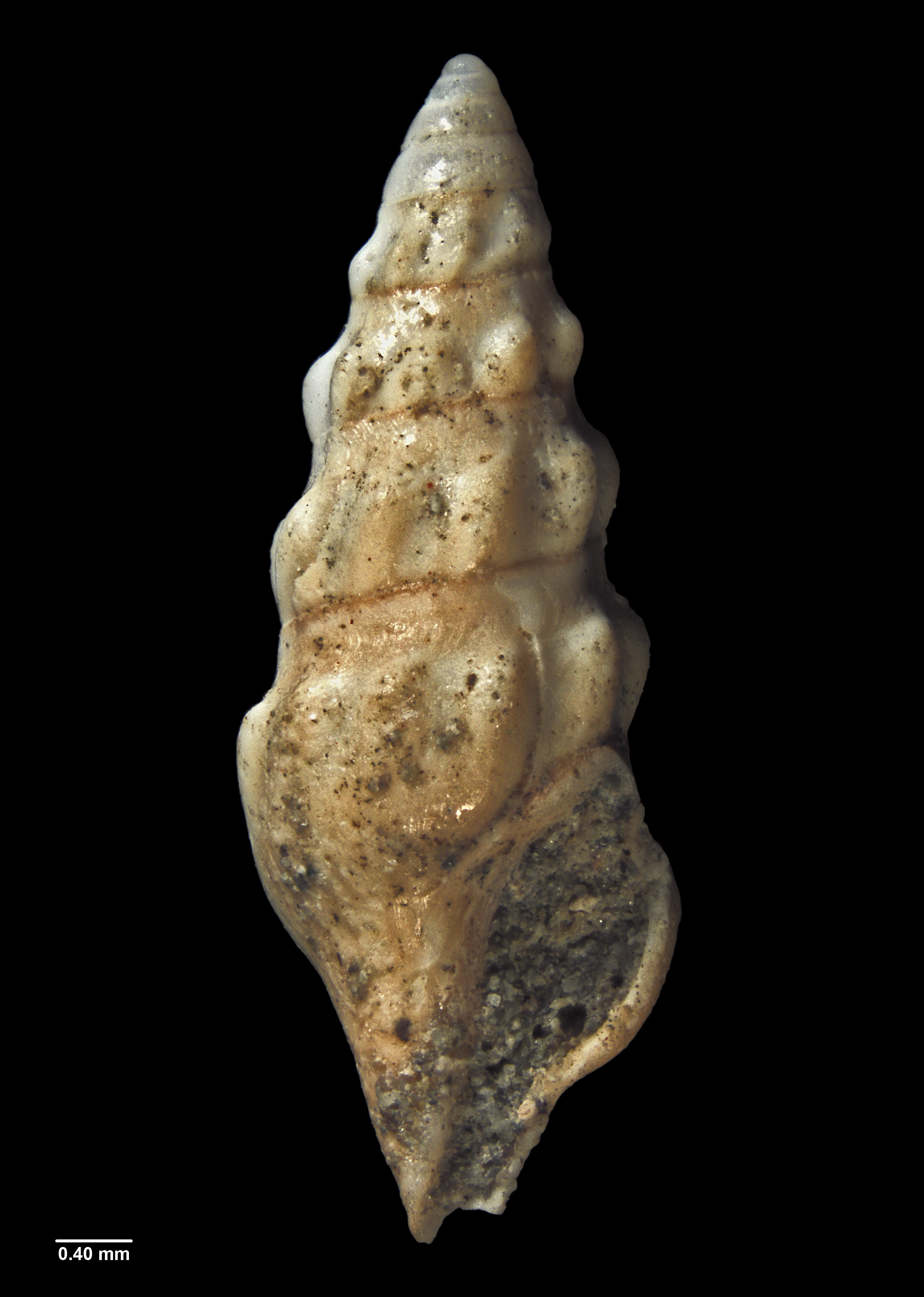
- Holotype from Auckland War Memorial Museum

Scientific classification
- Kingdom: Animalia
- Phylum: Mollusca
- Class: Gastropoda
- Subclass: Caenogastropoda
- Order: Neogastropoda
- Family: incertae sedis
- Genus: †Austroclavus
- Species: †A. awakinoensis

Binomial name
- †Austroclavus awakinoensis Powell, 1942

= Austroclavus awakinoensis =

Austroclavus awakinoensis Temporal range: early Miocene

Extinct species of gastropod

Austroclavus awakinoensis is an extinct species of sea snail, a marine gastropod mollusc in the superfamily Conoidea, currently not assigned to a family. Fossils of the species date to the early Miocene, and have been found near Awakino in the Waikato Region, New Zealand.

== Description ==
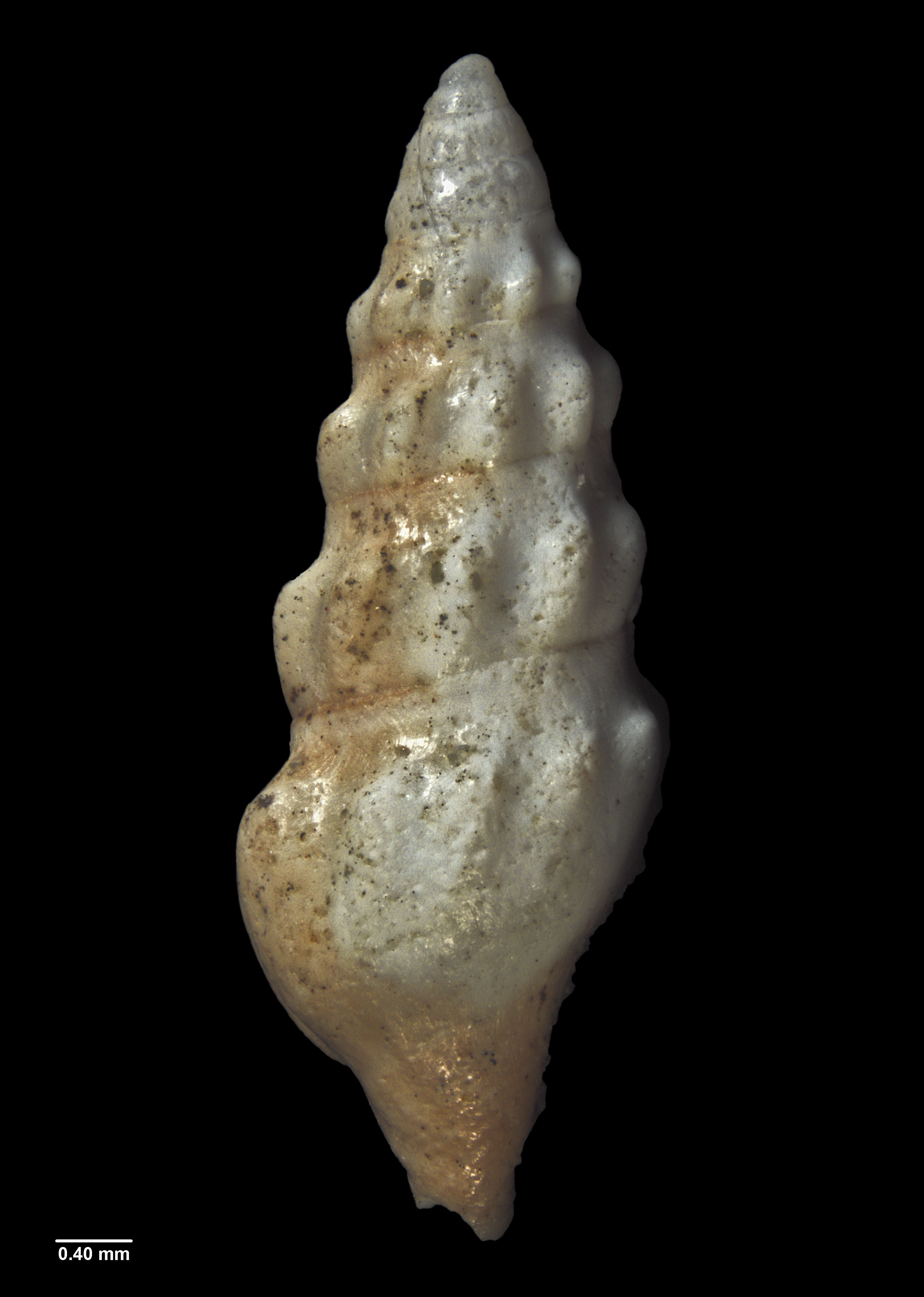
Reverse view of holotype

The species has a small shell, a protoconch with five whorls with a lightly margined suture. The shell has eight whorls in total, which are angled at the middle. The holotype of the species measures 6.5 mm (0.26 in) in height and 2.4 mm (0.094 in) in diameter.

== Taxonomy ==
The species was first described by A.W.B. Powell in 1942. The holotype was collected from near Awakino in the Waitomo District, 3 km (1.9 mi) east of the Awakino Gorge road tunnel by C. R. Laws, at an unknown date prior to 1942. It is held by the Auckland War Memorial Museum.

== Distribution ==
This extinct marine species dates to the early Miocene (Otaian), and occurs in the Mahoenui Formation east of the Awakino Gorge in the southwestern Waikato Region, New Zealand.
