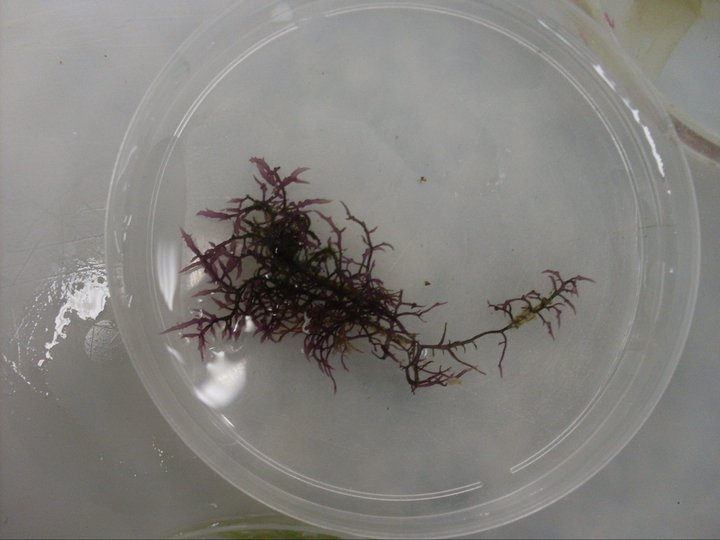
- Chondracanthus sp.

Scientific classification
- Clade: Archaeplastida
- Division: Rhodophyta
- Class: Florideophyceae
- Order: Gigartinales
- Family: Gigartinaceae
- Genus: Chondracanthus; Kützing 1843

Species
- See text

= Chondracanthus (alga) =

Genus of algae

Chondracanthus is a red algae genus in the family Gigartinaceae. The name Chondracanthus is from χόνδρος} (khóndros or chondrus) meaning 'cartilage' and ακανθα (acantha) meaning 'spine or thorn,' together meaning 'with cartilaginous spines.' This refers to the rubbery papillae on the surface of the blades containing the reproductive structures.

== Species ==
- Chondracanthus acicularis
- Chondracanthus bajacalifornicus
- Chondracanthus canaliculatus
- Chondracanthus chamissoi
- Chondracanthus chapmanii
- Chondracanthus chauvinii
- Chondracanthus corymbiferus
- Chondracanthus elegans
- Chondracanthus exasperatus (Harvey & Bailey) Hughey 1996 - Turkish towel
- Chondracanthus glomeratus
- Chondracanthus harveyanus
- Chondracanthus intermedius
- Chondracanthus johnstonii
- Chondracanthus kjeldsenii
- Chondracanthus saundersii
- Chondracanthus serratus
- Chondracanthus spinosus
- Chondracanthus squarrulosus
- Chondracanthus teedei
- Chondracanthus tenellus
- Chondracanthus tepidus

== Phylogeny ==
A 2008 assessment of the genus showed the following phylogenetic tree:

- C. acicularis
- - - C. chapmanii
    - - C. intermedius
      - C. tenellus
  - - - C. harveyanus
      - - C. corymbiferus
        - - C. serratus
          - - C. bajacalifornicus
            - - C. kjeldsenii
              - C. canaliculatus
    - - - C. chamissoi
        - C. tepidus
      - - C. teedei
        - - C. squarrulosus
          - - C. spinosus
            - C. exasperatus
