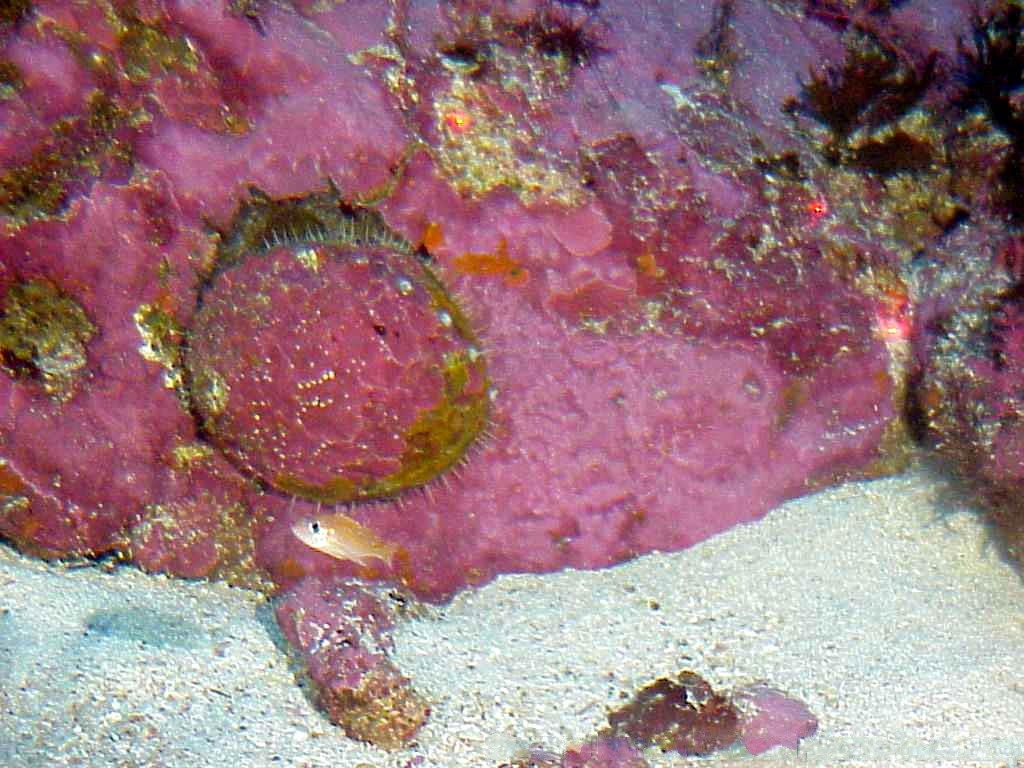
- A live individual of Haliotis sorenseni, left of center. The shell and the rock are covered with red coralline algae.

Conservation status
- Critically Endangered (IUCN 3.1)

- Endangered (ESA)

Scientific classification
- Kingdom: Animalia
- Phylum: Mollusca
- Class: Gastropoda
- Subclass: Vetigastropoda
- Order: Lepetellida
- Superfamily: Haliotoidea
- Family: Haliotidae
- Genus: Haliotis
- Species: H. sorenseni

Binomial name
- Haliotis sorenseni Bartsch, 1940

= Haliotis sorenseni =

Species of gastropod

The white abalone, scientific name Haliotis sorenseni, is a species of large sea snail, a marine gastropod mollusk in the family Haliotidae, the abalone.

The white abalone is an endangered species in the United States; it may now have the smallest population of all eight of the abalone species on the west coast of North America.

== Distribution ==
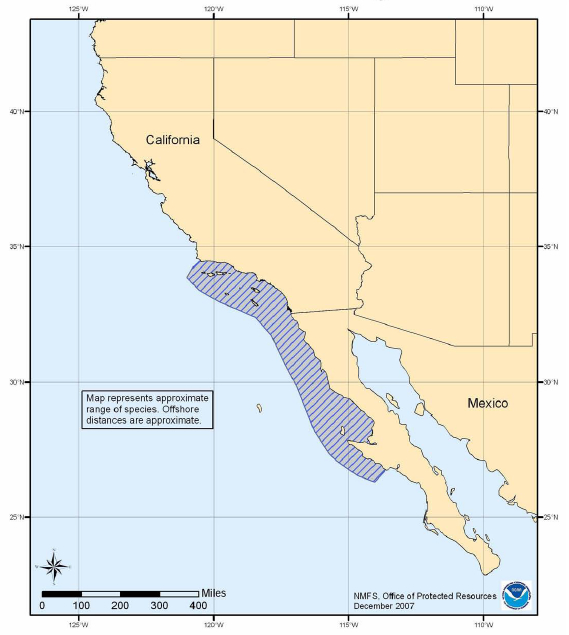
A map of the distribution of the White abalone, Haliotis sorenseni

Historically the white abalone ranged from Point Conception, California, to Baja California, Mexico, and was found especially on the offshore islands.

In the most northerly part of the California range, white abalone were reported as being more common along the mainland coast. However, in the middle portion of the California range, they were noted to occur more frequently at the offshore islands, especially San Clemente and Santa Catalina Islands. At the more southerly end of the range, in Baja California, Mexico, white abalone were reported to occur more commonly along the mainland coast, but were also found at a number of islands including Isla Cedros and Isla Natividad.

It remains unknown whether this distribution pattern was a result of lack of suitable habitat along the mainland coast in the mid portion of the range, or was instead due to overfishing in these more accessible mainland regions.

Since the mid-1990s, extremely low numbers of isolated survivors have been identified along the mainland coast in Santa Barbara County and at some of the offshore islands and banks in the middle portion of the range, indicating the current range of white abalone in California may be similar to what it was historically.

No recent information on current range is available for Baja California. The white abalone population in Mexico is thought to be depleted based on commercial fishery data, but the status of the species in Mexico remains largely unknown.

== Description ==
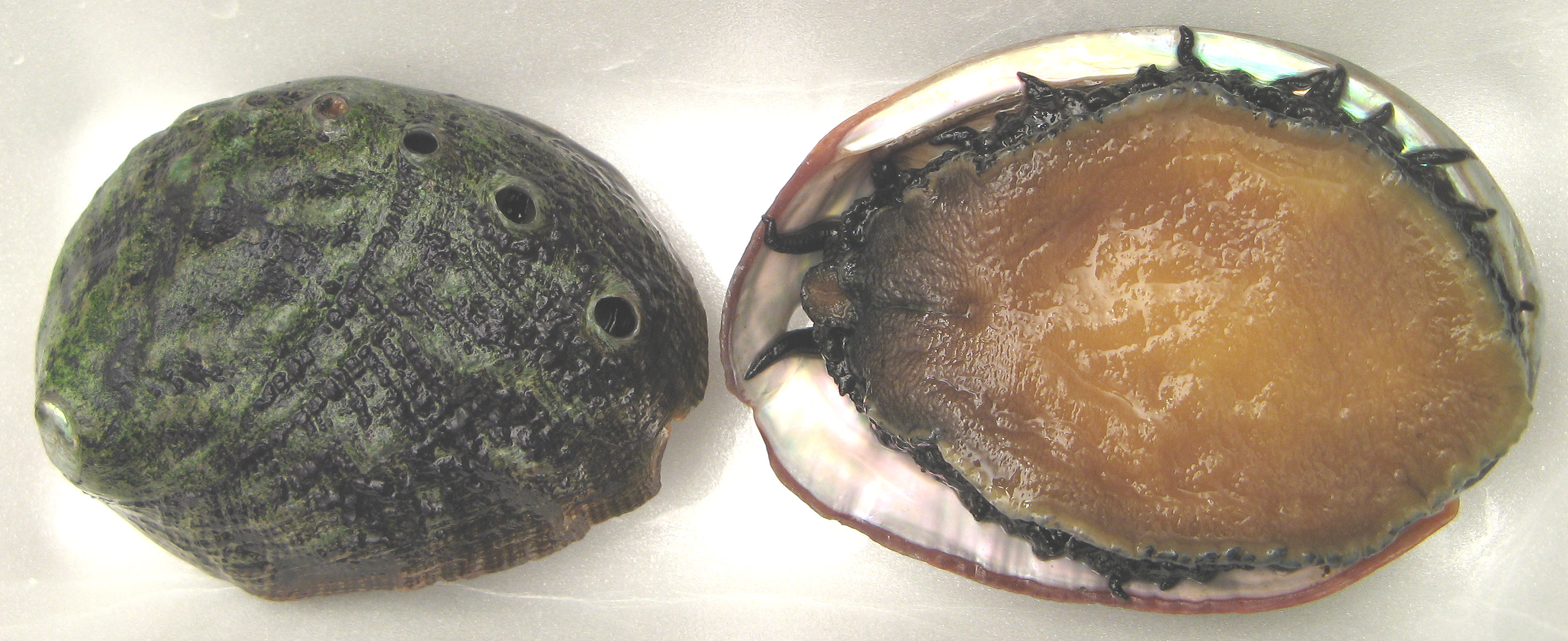
Two White Abalones. Left: dorsal view; Right: ventral view, showing the large muscular foot

=== Shell ===
The white abalone usually has between 3–5 open holes (respiratory pores) in its shell. These holes collectively make up what is known as the selenizone which form as the shell grows. The shell is oval-shaped, very thin and deep. White abalone can grow to about 10 in (25 cm), but are usually 5–8 in (13–20 cm).

=== Anatomy ===
The epipodial tentacles are lacy, beige and yellow-green in color. The bottom of its foot is orange, and the epipodium (a sensory structure and extension of the foot that bears tentacles) is a mottled orange tan.

== Ecology ==
=== Habitat ===
The white abalone is the deepest dwelling of eight species of California abalone, living at depths from 80 to 200 ft (24–61 m). White abalone are found in open low and high relief rock or boulder habitat that is interspersed with sand channels. Sand channels may be important for the movement and concentration of drift macroalgae, and a variety of red algae, upon which white abalone are known to feed.

=== Feeding habits ===
The white abalone is known to be a herbivore, grazing mainly on macroalgae, such as Laminaria farlowii and Agarum fimbriatum, and also several species of red algae. Other species it eats include Chondracanthus exasperatus, Laminaria farlowii, Macrocystis pyrifera, and Palmaria mollis.

=== Life cycle ===
Like many gastropods, white abalone have a complex life cycle involving larval stages. Fertilized eggs hatch into larvae; these larvae eventually settle from the plankton to a hard substrate and metamorphose into the adult form. As a broadcast spawning gastropod, white abalone reproduce by releasing their eggs and sperm into the surrounding water. If fertilized, the eggs hatch after only one day, but sperm is required in order for an egg to be fertilized. Therefore, aggregations of adult male and female abalone are observed to improve fertilization.

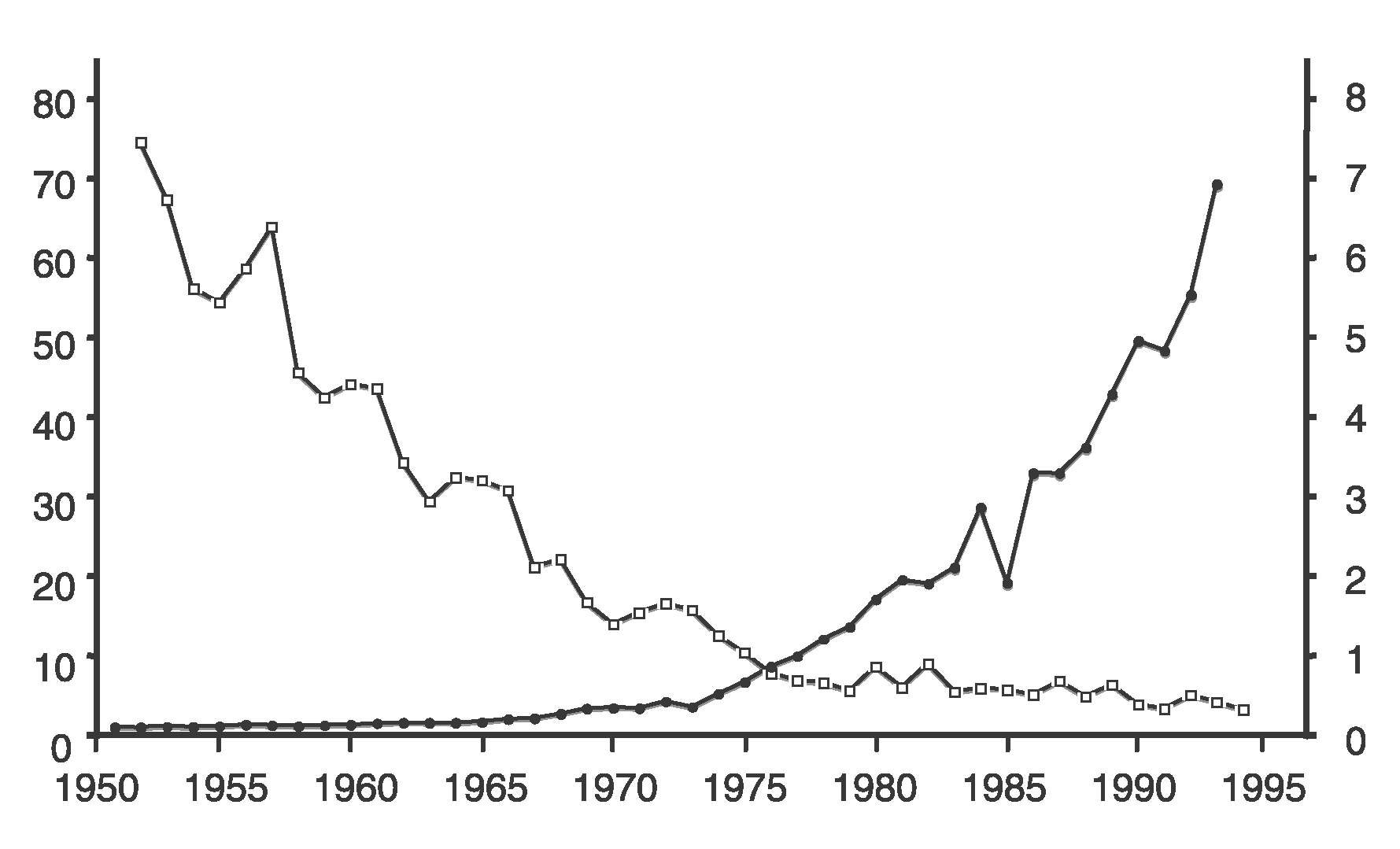
California Commercial White Abalone Haliotis sorenseni Landings for 1972–1992. The price exponentially increased as catch decreased. Even taking fishing effort into account, the volume of abalone fished is inversely proportional to the price (power regression model, F40,2 = 139.96; p < 0.0001). open squares – commercial catch per unit effort left y axis – thousands of pounds of shell per vessel filled circles – price of Haliotis sorenseni right y axis – US$ per pound.

== Human use ==
Scripps Institution of Oceanography biologists conducted surveys of white abalone deep water habitat in the early 1970s, finding high concentrations of about one white abalone per square meter. Such densities were comparable to abundance of shallower species of abalone found in previously unfished or protected areas. Unfortunately, the high demand for the species led to a "boom-and-bust" fishery, which reduced the populations of this species in seven years.

Considered a delicacy in California, white abalone, the rarest of the eight abalone species in the state, have declined due to poaching – the fishery was closed in 1996 – while at the same time, prices have escalated. Although white abalone were the first marine invertebrate on the United States Federal List of Endangered Species in 2001, the species could nevertheless become extinct unless extraordinary recovery measures are implemented. White abalone is being maricultured in order to produce young that can be placed back in the ocean, in hopes of bringing this species back to secure population levels before it becomes extinct. The White Abalone Restoration Consortium is a partnership with the Bodega Marine Laboratory [University of California, Davis], The Cultured Abalone Farm, the Santa Barbara Museum of Natural History Sea Center and the National Oceanic and Atmospheric Administration Southwest Fisheries Science Center on the Gaviota Coast which is studying the marine snail and restoring the wild populations. They are also collaborating in developing curriculum to educate the next generation about sustainable aquaculture and conservation.
