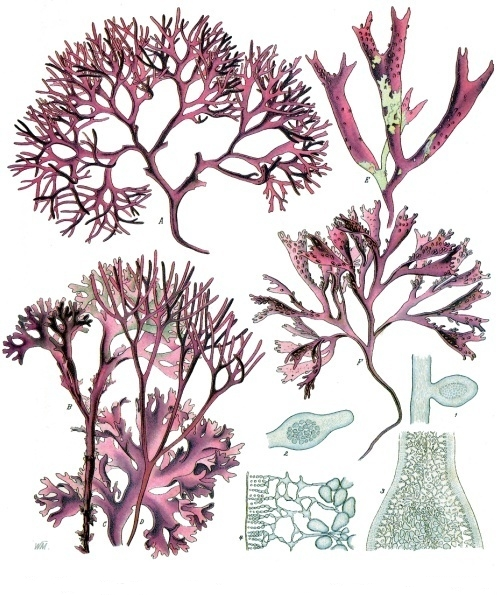
- A-D Chondrus crispus; E-F Mastocarpus stellatus

Scientific classification
- Domain: Eukaryota
- Supergroup: Archaeplastida
- Division: Rhodophyta
- Class: Florideophyceae
- Order: Gigartinales
- Family: Gigartinaceae
- Genus: Chondrus
- Species: C. crispus

Binomial name
- Chondrus crispus Stackh.

= Chondrus crispus =

Irish moss

Species of edible alga

Chondrus crispus—commonly called Irish moss or carrageenan moss (Irish carraigín, "little rock")—is a species of red algae which grows abundantly along the rocky parts of the Atlantic coasts of Europe and North America. In its fresh condition it is soft and cartilaginous, varying in color from a greenish-yellow, through red, to a dark purple or purplish-brown. The principal constituent is a mucilaginous body, made of the polysaccharide carrageenan, which constitutes 55% of its dry weight. The organism also consists of nearly 10% dry weight protein and about 15% dry weight mineral matter, and is rich in iodine and sulfur. When softened in water it has a sea-like odour. Because of the abundant cell wall polysaccharides, it will form a jelly when boiled, containing from 20 to 100 times its weight of water.

== Description ==
Chondrus crispus is a relatively small sea alga, reaching up to a little more than 20 centimetres (7 3/4 in) in length. It grows from a discoid holdfast and branches four or five times in a dichotomous, fan-like manner. The morphology is highly variable, especially the broadness of the thalli. The branches are 2–15 mm broad and firm in texture, and the color ranges from bright green towards the surface of the water, to deep red at greater depths. The gametophytes (see below) often show a blue iridescence at the tip of the fronds which is attributed to structural coloration and fertile sporophytes show a spotty pattern. Mastocarpus stellatus (Stackhouse) Guiry is a similar species which can be readily distinguished by its strongly channelled and often somewhat twisted thalli.

Irish moss undergoes an alternation of generation lifecycle common in many species of algae. The two distinct stages are the sexual haploid gametophyte stage and the asexual diploid sporophyte stage. In addition, a third stage – the carposporophyte – is formed on the female gametophyte after fertilization. The male and female gametophytes produce gametes which fuse to form a diploid carposporophyte, which forms carpospores, which develops into the sporophyte. The sporophyte then undergoes meiosis to produce haploid tetraspores (which can be male or female) that develop into gametophytes. The three stages (male, female, and sporophyte) are difficult to distinguish when they are not fertile; however, the gametophytes often show a blue iridescence.

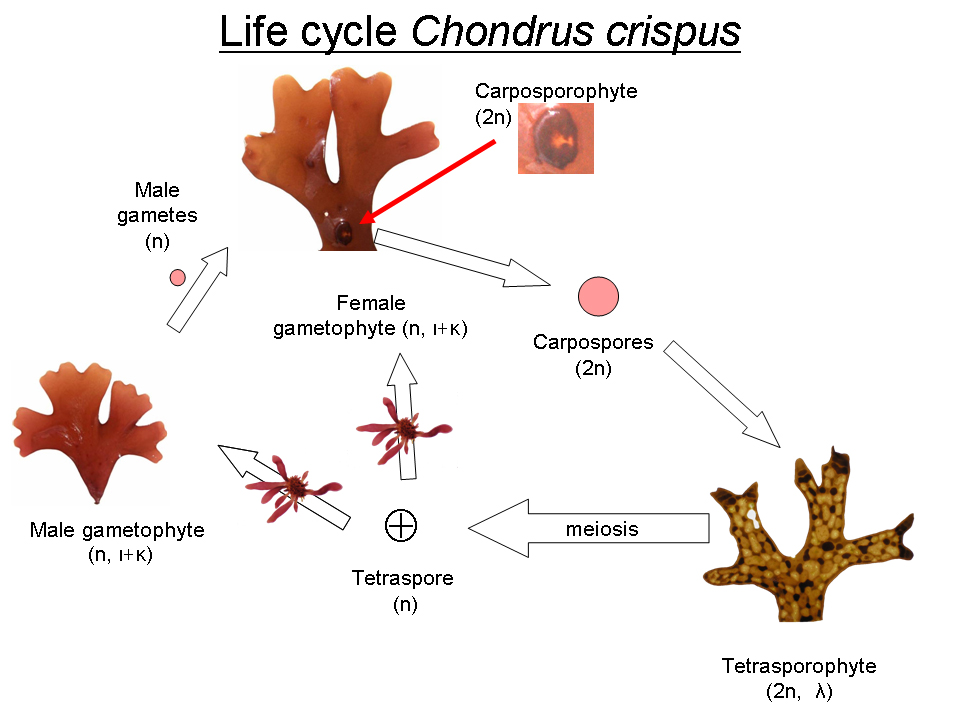
Lifecycle of C. crispus: Below the life stages are indicated if the life stage is haploid(n) or diploid (2n) and the type of carrageenan present.

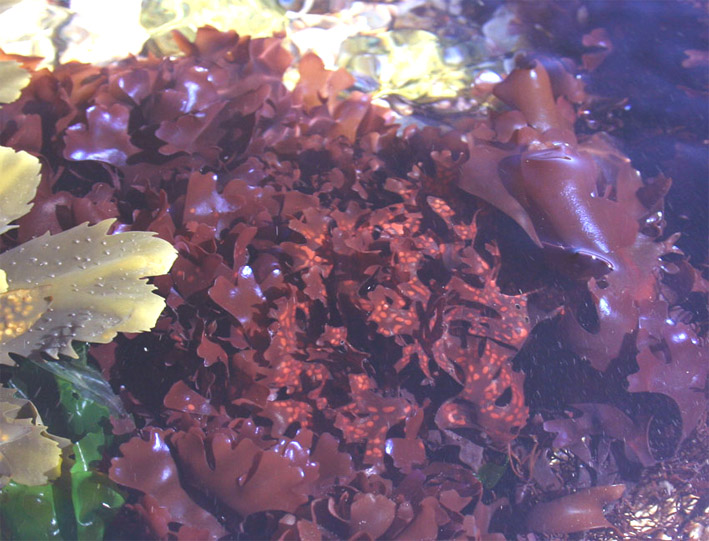
How the lifecycles of C. crispus might look in nature: The gametophytes show blue iridescence and the fertile sporophytes exhibit a spotty pattern.

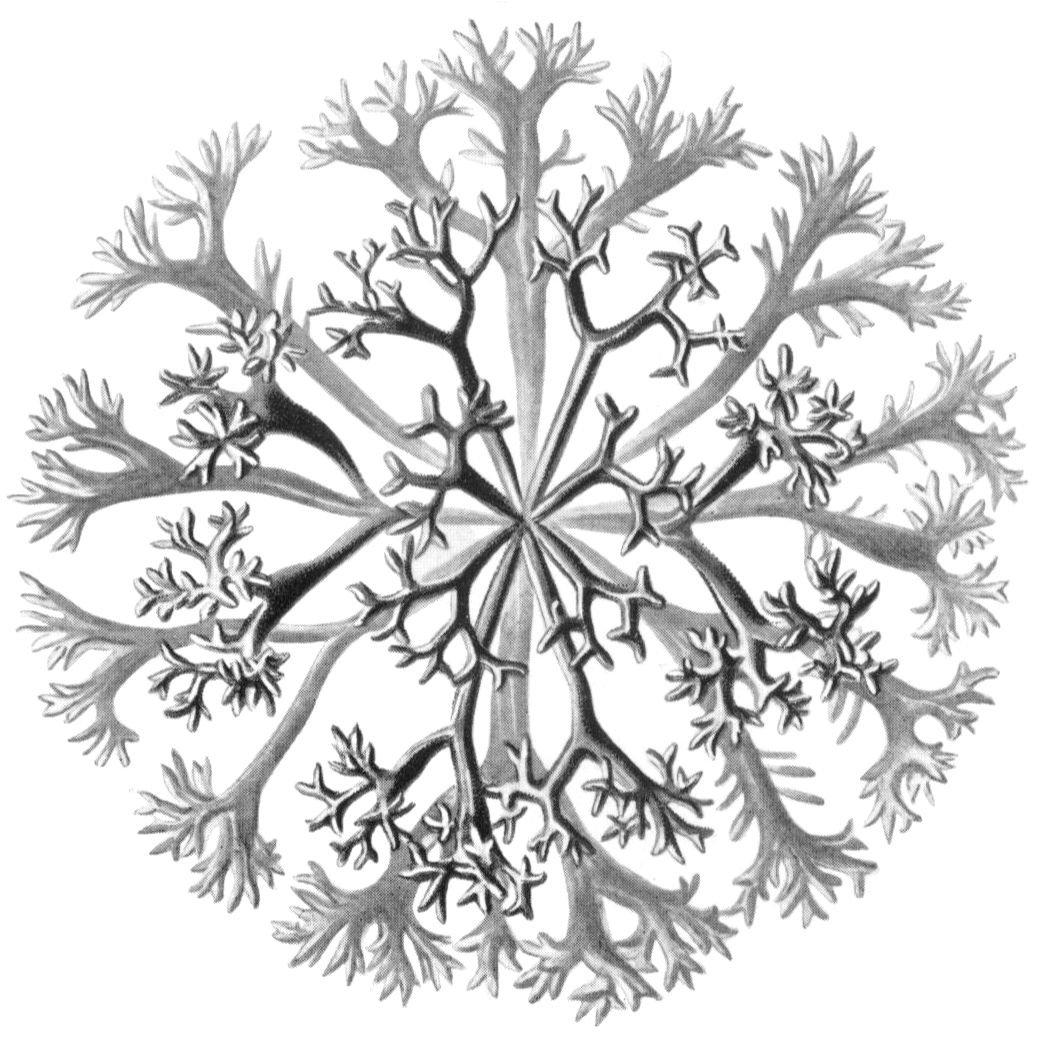
Illustration from Kunstformen der Natur (1904)

Laboratory-grown specimen displaying high symmetry.

== Distribution ==
Chondrus crispus is commonly found along the shores of Ireland and the coast of Europe including Iceland, the Faroe Islands, western Baltic Sea to southern Spain. It is found on the Atlantic coasts of Canada and recorded from California in the United States to Japan. However, any distribution outside the Northern Atlantic needs to be verified. There are also other species of the same genus in the Pacific Ocean, for example, C. ocellatus Holmes, C. nipponicus Yendo, C. yendoi Yamada et Mikami, C. pinnulatus (Harvey) Okamura and C. armatus (Harvey) Yamada et Mikami.

== Ecology ==
Chondrus crispus is found growing on rock from the middle intertidal zone into the subtidal zone, all the way to the ocean floor. It is able to survive with minimal sunlight.

C. crispus is susceptible to infection from the oomycete Pythium porphyrae.

Seaweed, irishmoss, raw
Nutritional value per 100 g (3.5 oz)
- Energy: 205 kJ (49 kcal)
- Carbohydrates: 12.29 g
- Sugars: 0.61 g
- Dietary fiber: 1.3 g
- Fat: 0.16 g
- Protein: 1.51 g
Vitamins and minerals
Vitamins	Quantity %DV^{†}
Riboflavin (B2)	36% 0.466 mg
Niacin (B3)	4% 0.593 mg
Pantothenic acid (B5)	4% 0.176 mg
Vitamin B6	4% 0.069 mg
Folate (B9)	46% 182 μg
Vitamin C	3% 3 mg
Vitamin E	6% 0.87 mg
Vitamin K	4% 5 μg
Minerals	Quantity %DV^{†}
Calcium	6% 72 mg
Iron	49% 8.9 mg
Magnesium	34% 144 mg
Manganese	16% 0.37 mg
Phosphorus	13% 157 mg
Sodium	3% 61 mg
Zinc	18% 1.95 mg
- Link to USDA Database entry
- ^{†}Percentages estimated using US recommendations for adults.

== Uses ==
C. crispus is traditionally used fresh as a thickening agent in carrageen pudding, a milk-based dish eaten in Scotland and Ireland.

Likewise, it is an industrial source of carrageenan commonly used as a thickener and stabilizer in milk products, such as ice cream and processed foods. During World War 2 the allies used carageenan as an alternative to agar which had been cut off due to Japan being the sole producer. In Europe, it is indicated as E407 or E407a. It may also be used as a thickener in calico printing and paper marbling, and for fining beer. Irish moss is frequently used with Mastocarpus stellatus (Gigartina mamillosa), Chondracanthus acicularis (G. acicularis), and other seaweeds, which are all commonly found growing together. Carrageenan may be extracted from tropical seaweeds of the genera Kappaphycus and Eucheuma.

== Scientific interest ==
C. crispus, compared to most other seaweeds, is well-investigated scientifically. It has been used as a model species to study photosynthesis, carrageenan biosynthesis, and stress responses. The nuclear genome was sequenced in 2013. The genome size is 105 Mbp and is coding for 9,606 genes. It is characterised by relatively few genes with very few introns. The genes are clustered together, with normally short distances between genes and then large distances between groups of genes.

== See also ==
- Gelidium amansii
- Eucheuma
