= Mazzaella (alga) =

Scientific classification
- Clade: Archaeplastida
- Division: Rhodophyta
- Class: Florideophyceae
- Order: Gigartinales
- Family: Gigartinaceae
- Genus: Mazzaella; G.De Toni 1936

Species
- See text

Genus of algae

Mazzaella is a red algae genus in the family Gigartinaceae.

High concentrations of taurine have been found in Mazzaella species.

== Species ==
- Mazzaella affinis
- Mazzaella californica
- Mazzaella canaliculata
- Mazzaella capensis
- Mazzaella convoluta
- Mazzaella denticulata
- Mazzaella flaccida
- Mazzaella japonica
- Mazzaella laminarioides
- Mazzaella leptorhynchos
- Mazzaella linearis
- Mazzaella membranacea
- Mazzaella minima
- Mazzaella oregona
- Mazzaella parksii
- Mazzaella phyllocarpa
- Mazzaella rosea
- Mazzaella splendens
- Mazzaella volans
