= Traskorchestia traskiana =

Scientific classification
- Domain: Eukaryota
- Kingdom: Animalia
- Phylum: Arthropoda
- Class: Malacostraca
- Order: Amphipoda
- Family: Talitridae
- Genus: Traskorchestia
- Species: T. traskiana

Binomial name
- Traskorchestia traskiana (Stimpson, 1857)

Species of crustacean

Traskorchestia traskiana, the Pacific beach hopper, is a species of beach hopper in the family Talitridae.
