= Traskorchestia =

Scientific classification
- Domain: Eukaryota
- Kingdom: Animalia
- Phylum: Arthropoda
- Class: Malacostraca
- Order: Amphipoda
- Family: Talitridae
- Genus: Traskorchestia; Bousfield, 1982

Genus of crustaceans

Traskorchestia is a genus of beach hoppers in the family Talitridae. There are at least three described species in Traskorchestia.

== Species ==
These three species belong to the genus Traskorchestia:

- Traskorchestia georgiana (Bousfield, 1958)
- Traskorchestia ochotensis (Brandt, 1851)
- Traskorchestia traskiana (Stimpson, 1857) (Pacific beach hopper)
