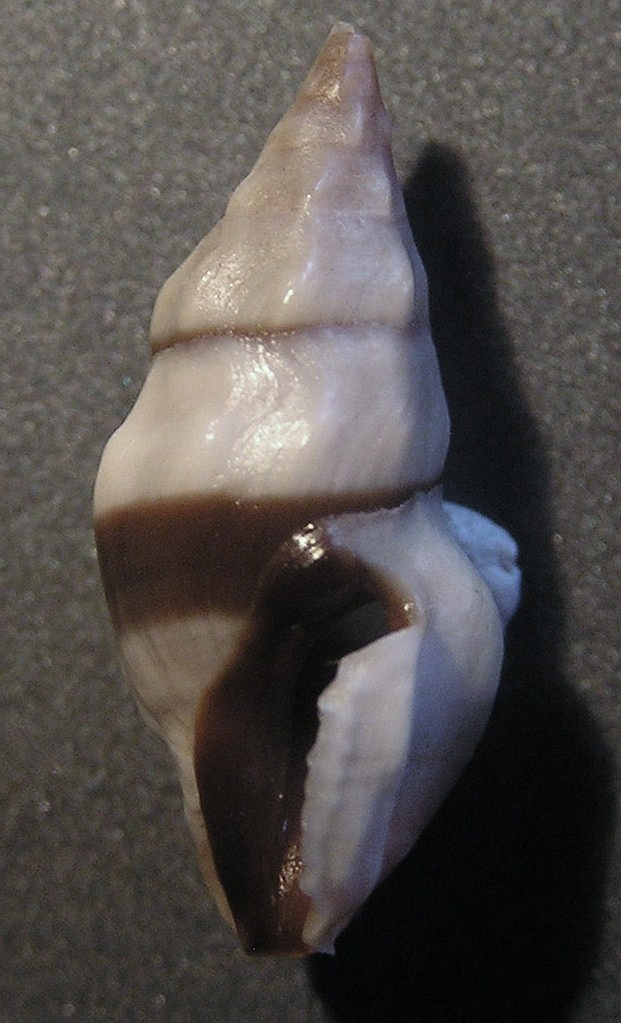

Scientific classification
- Kingdom: Animalia
- Phylum: Mollusca
- Class: Gastropoda
- Subclass: Caenogastropoda
- Order: Neogastropoda
- Superfamily: Conoidea
- Family: Drilliidae
- Genus: Clavus
- Species: C. exasperatus

Binomial name
- Clavus exasperatus (Reeve, 1843)

Synonyms
- Austroclavus exasperatus (Reeve, 1843); Clavus (Tylotia) exasperatus (Reeve, 1843); Drillia auriculifera var. exasperata Bouge & Dautzenberg, 1913; Drillia exasperata Smith, 1903; Drillia livida Hedley, 1909; Pleurotoma exasperata Reeve, 1843; Pleurotoma exigua Hombron, J.B. & C.H. Jacquinot, 1854

= Clavus exasperatus =

Species of gastropod

Clavus exasperatus, common name the exasperating turrid, is a species of sea snail, a marine gastropod mollusk in the family Drilliidae.

== Description ==
The size of an adult shell varies between 15 mm and 30 mm. The shell is white, with a broad chestnut band below the periphery. The tuberculations of the periphery are short. There is usually a revolving row of nodules below the middle of the body whorl.

== Distribution ==
This species occurs in the demersal zone of tropical waters in the Indo-Pacific and off the Mascarene Basin and Réunion and Mozambique; also off Papua New Guinea and Australia (Northern Territory, Queensland, Western Australia).
