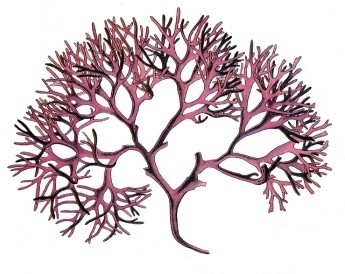
- Chondrus crispus

Scientific classification
- Domain: Eukaryota
- Clade: Archaeplastida
- Division: Rhodophyta
- Class: Florideophyceae
- Order: Gigartinales
- Family: Gigartinaceae; Kützing

Genera
- Chondracanthus; Chondrus; Gigartina; Psilophycus

= Gigartinaceae =

Family of algae

Gigartinaceae is a red algae family in the order Gigartinales.

== Genera ==
Genera in the family Gigartinaceae include:

- Chondracanthus Kützing, 1843
- Chondrus Stackhouse, 1797
- Gigartina Stackhouse, 1809
- Iridaea Bory de Saint-Vincent, 1826
- Mazzaella G. De Toni, 1936
- Ostiophyllum Kraft, 2003
- Psilophycus W.A.Nelson, Leister & Hommersand, 2011
- Rhodoglossum J.Agardh, 1876
- Sarcothalia Kützing, 1849
