= Culdaff Lifeboat Station =

Former RNLI lifeboat station in County Donegal, Ireland

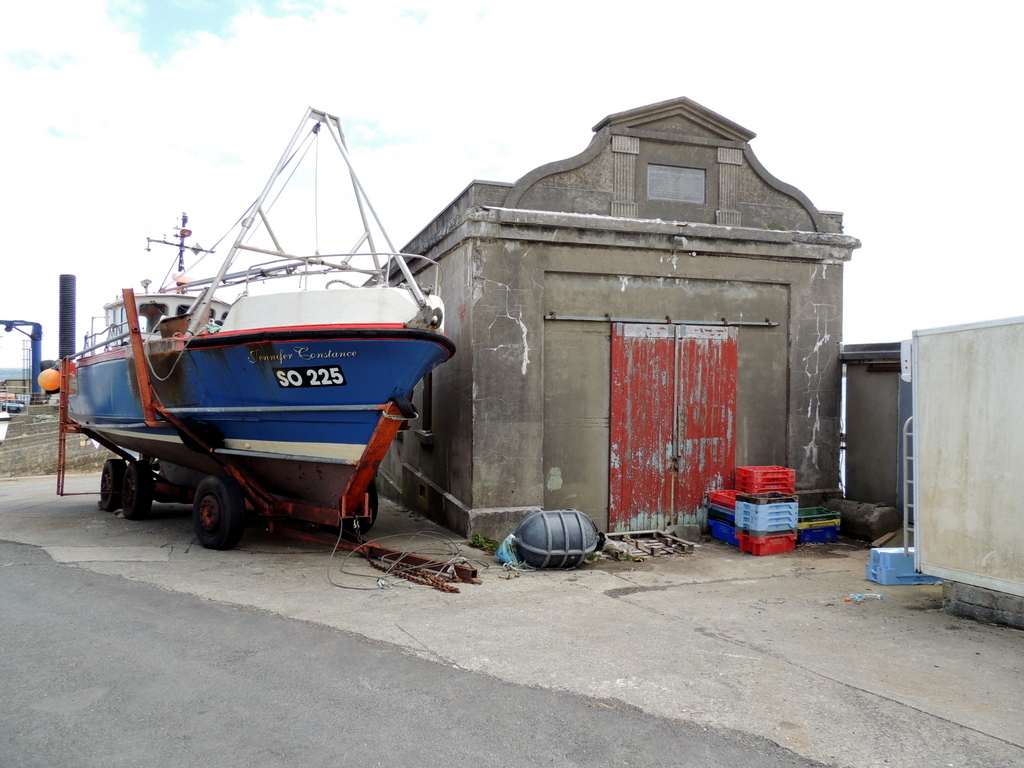
- Former Culdaff Lifeboat Station

- Culdaff, County Donegal

General information
- Status: Closed
- Type: RNLI Lifeboat Station
- Location: The Harbour, Bunnagee, Culdaff, County Donegal, Ireland
- Coordinates: 55°17′59.2″N 7°09′16.0″W
- Opened: 1892
- Closed: 1913

Culdaff Lifeboat Station was located at Bunnagee Port, overlooking Culdaff Bay, approximately 11 nautical miles (20 km) south-east of Malin Head, on the north-east coast of the Inishowen Peninsula, in County Donegal, Ireland.

A lifeboat station was first established at Bunnagee Port in 1892 by the Royal National Lifeboat Institution (RNLI).

After operating for just 21 years, Culdaff Lifeboat Station closed in 1913.

== History ==
On the 30 January 1854, the brig Lady Octavia, on passage to Glasgow from Brazil, was wrecked at Malin Head, in a south-west gale. Ten crew got away in the ship's boat, but it was overturned and smashed before they reached the shore, and one boy was drowned. The Master and three crew were rescued after a line was brought to the ship by Coastguard James Fitzpatrick, who waded out through the surf at great personal risk.

Ever since its founding in 1824, the Royal National Institution for the Preservation of Life from Shipwreck (RNIPLS), later to become the RNLI in 1854, would award medals for deeds of gallantry at sea, even if no lifeboats were involved. James Fitzpatrick, Chief Boatman, H.M. Coastguard, Malin Head, was awarded the RNIPLS Silver Medal.

It was 37 years later, at a meeting of the RNLI committee of management on 6 Aug 1891, that it was decided to establish a lifeboat station at Culdaff.

In the RNLI journal 'The Lifeboat' of 1 February 1893, it was reported that the station at Culdaff had been established, "...for the benefit of the coasting vessels trading to and from Culdaff Bay, and to assist the fishing-boats when they are overtaken by sudden gales of wind and heavy seas. A fine new boat-house and a launching slipway have accordingly been constructed at a considerable expense, and a new Life-boat, a transporting and launching carriage, and the usual full equipment of stores have been despatched to the station."

The most modern type of lifeboat of the day, a 34-foot x 8-foot self-righting 'Pulling and Sailing' (P&S) Lifeboat, one with both sails and 10 oars, double-banked, along with two water-ballast tanks, and a drop-keel, was delivered to Culdaff.

The complete cost had been covered by the gift of Mrs Montgomery of Littleover, Derbyshire, in memory of her son William Arthur Patrick Montgomery, who died on 12 April 1891 aged 37. A stone tablet recording the details was fixed in the boathouse. At a service of dedication and naming ceremony on 8 December 1892, with crowds of spectators taking every available vantage point, the lifeboat was named William Montgomery (ON 336), in accordance with her wishes.

The lifeboat was then let down the slipway to the water by means of the windlass, and boarded by the crew, wearing their blue jerseys, red caps and life-belts. A demonstration of the boat then followed, amid considerable interest and excitement from the assembled crowd, many it was thought may have never witnessed such an event. After 30 minutes, the boat was brought ashore and returned to the boat house, and the event was completed with a lunch for invited guests.

On 12 February 1894, the Culdaff lifeboat was launched, not to a vessel in trouble, but to an Island in trouble. Distress signals were seen flying on Inishtrahull Island on 11 February 1894, the most northerly of all the Irish islands, 5 nmi (9.3 km) north-east of Malin Head, and the location of Inishtrahull Lighthouse. Fishermen from the island had headed over to the mainland for provisions three weeks earlier, but had been unable to return due to the poor weather, leaving the remaining residents desperately short of food and fuel. Supplies were obtained, and the lifeboat crew assembled, but it was clear that conditions were just too bad to set out. At 05:00 on 12 February, the crew assembled again, and set out, but were forced back to the harbour, after only getting half-way. Launched a second time at 15:35, the lifeboat finally made it to the island, landing with considerable difficulty in dark and rough conditions. The lifeboat returned home the following morning. 35-years later, in 1929, the island of Inishtrahull was abandoned by the population, just leaving the lighthouse keepers. They too left when the light was finally automated in 1987.

At a meeting of the RNLI committee of management on Thursday 13 February 1913, it was decided to close the lifeboat station at Culdaff. The best thanks of the Institution were accorded to Honorary Secretary Mr. R. M. Fleming in recognition of his long and valuable services.

The lifeboat house at Bunnagee still stands, and is currently used as a store. The lifeboat on station at the time of closure, and the only lifeboat to have been stationed at Culdaff, William Montgomery (ON 336), was transferred to the relief fleet, and used for demonstration purposes, until being sold in 1917.

== Station honours ==
The following are awards made at Culdaff.

- RNIPLS Silver Medal

James Fitzpatrick, Chief Boatman, H.M. Coastguard, Malin Head – 1854

== Culdaff lifeboat ==
ON (Note: ON is the RNLI's Official Number of the boat.)	Name	Built	On station	Class	Comments
336	William Montgomery	1892	1892–1913	34-foot Self-righting (P&S)	(Note: 34-foot x 8-foot (10-oared) self-righting (P&S) lifeboat, gift of Mrs Montgomery of Derby, built by Forrestt of Limehouse, London, costing £413.)

Station Closed, 1913

== See also ==
- List of RNLI stations
- List of former RNLI stations
- Royal National Lifeboat Institution lifeboats
