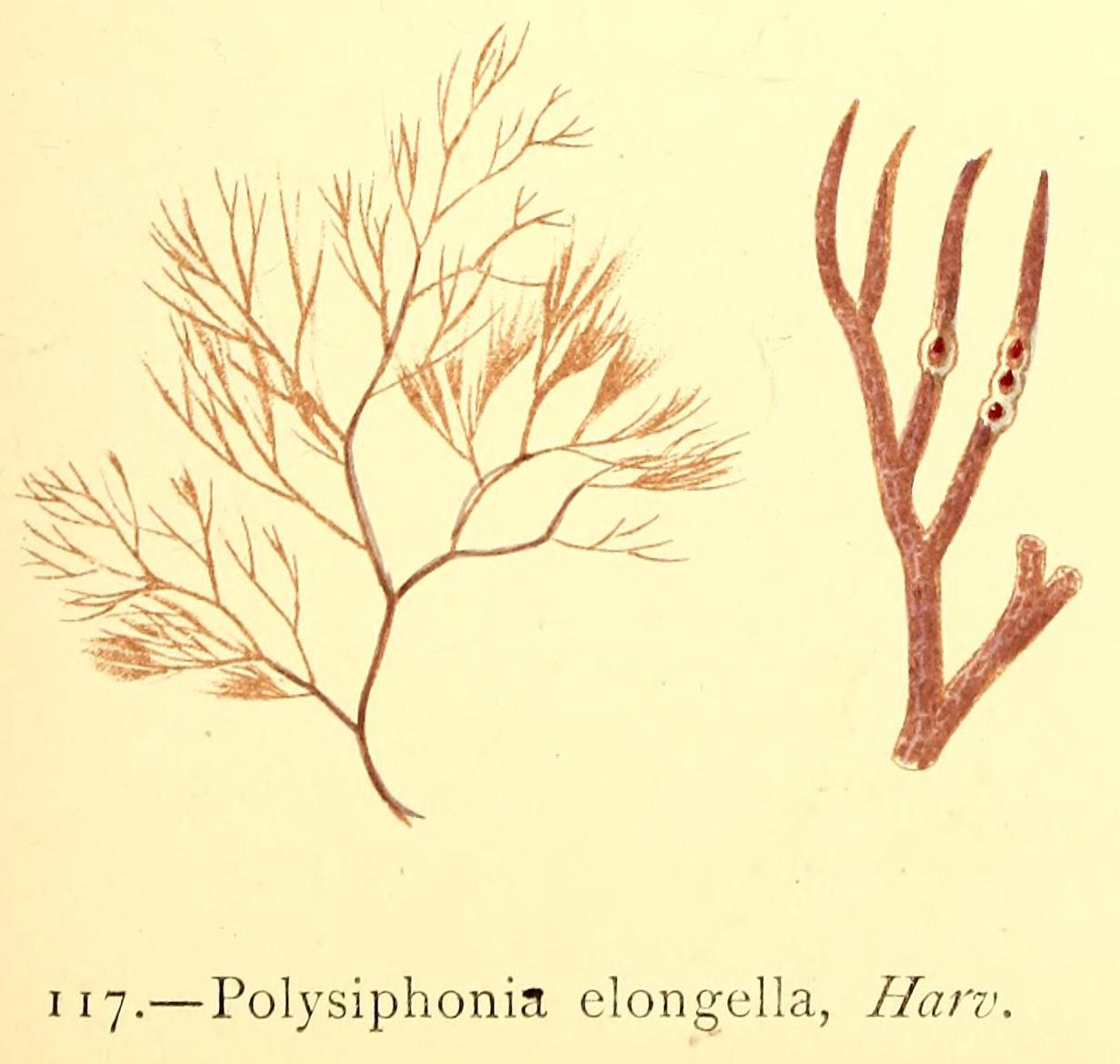
- Illustration of Polysiphonia elongella

Scientific classification
- Clade: Archaeplastida
- Division: Rhodophyta
- Class: Florideophyceae
- Order: Ceramiales
- Family: Rhodomelaceae
- Genus: Polysiphonia
- Species: P. elongella

Binomial name
- Polysiphonia elongella Harvey

= Polysiphonia elongella =

Species of algae

Polysiphonia elongella Harvey in W.J. Hooker is a branched species of marine red algae in the genus in the Polysiphonia in the Rhodophyta.

== Description ==
This marine alga grows as small cylindrical thalli branching to about 10 cm long. It grows as an erect axis attached by a disk-like holdfast. The main axis is unbranched towards the base but bears lateral branches higher up. Each erect axes is composed of a polysiphonous axis with a central row of cells surrounded 4 perixial cells all of the same length. The branches, unlike Polysiphonia elongate, are only slightly constricted at their base. Cortication filaments grow downwards in the grooves between the periaxial cells and lower down these form a complete cortication. Trichoblasts are borne near the apices.

== Reproduction ==
Globose cystocarps and bisporangia are recorded, the tetrasporangia are sparse.

== Habitat ==
Grows below low-water on sheltered shores.

== Distribution ==
The species is recorded from Ireland, Great Britain, including the Isle of Man, the Shetland Islands and the Channel Islands. The few records from Northern Ireland are old and require confirmation. Also recorded from France and the Mediterranean.
