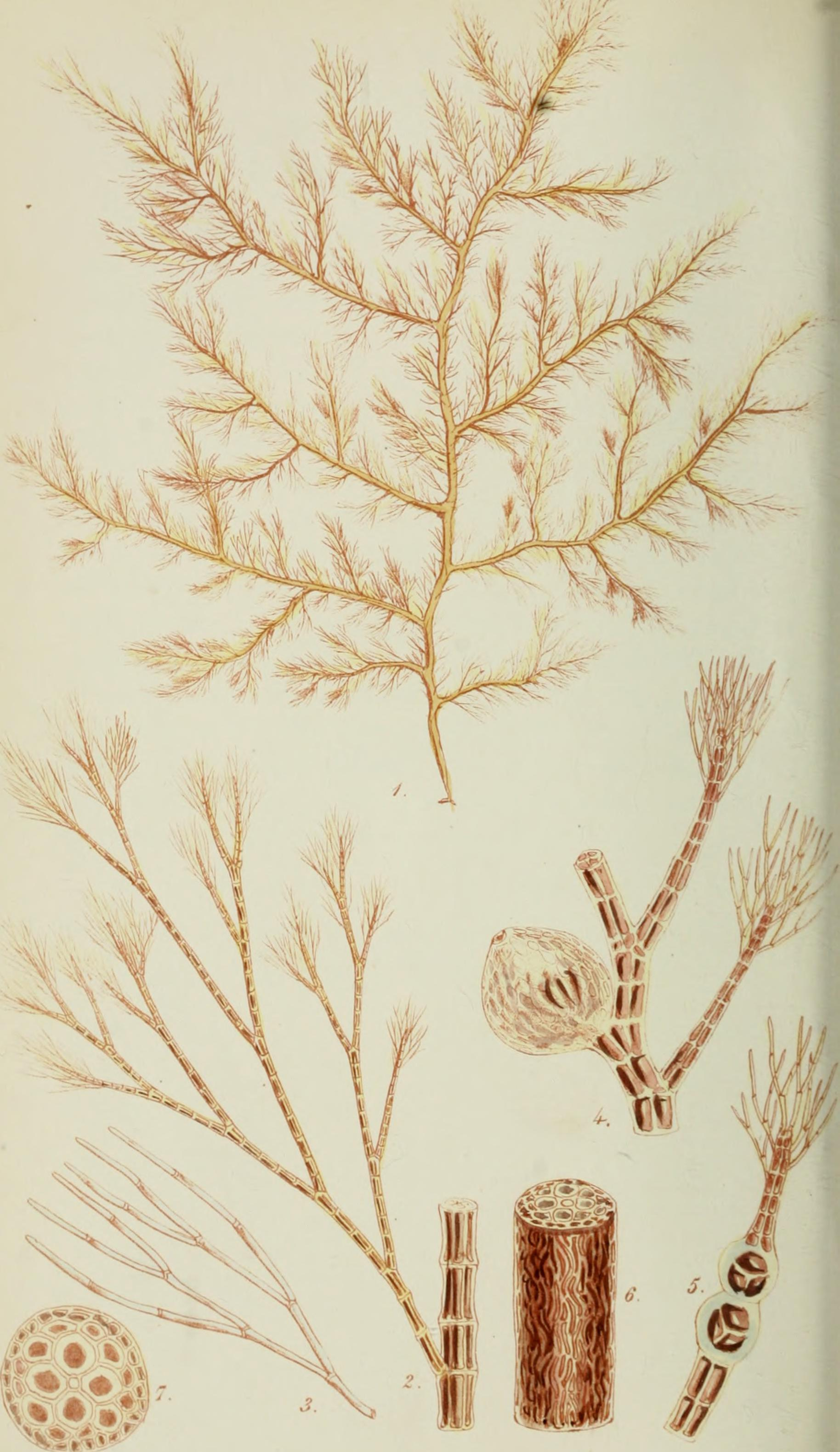
- Illustration of Polysiphonia fibrillosa. 1. natural size. 2. A small branch. 3. Fibril from one of the tips of the same. 4. Branchlets with a capsule. 5. Branchlet with tetraspores. 6. Portion of the lower part of the stem. 7. Transverse section of the same.

Scientific classification
- Clade: Archaeplastida
- Division: Rhodophyta
- Class: Florideophyceae
- Order: Ceramiales
- Family: Rhodomelaceae
- Genus: Polysiphonia
- Species: P. fibrillosa

Binomial name
- Polysiphonia fibrillosa (Dillwyn) Sprengel

= Polysiphonia fibrillosa =

Species of alga

Polysiphonia fibrillosa (Dillwyn) Sprengel is a species of marine red alga in the Rhodophyta.

== Description ==
Polysiphonia fibrillose is a fine red alga which grows to 25 cm long. The erect cylindrical branches are themselves branched and are attached by a discoid holdfast. The branches consist of a central axis of cells each surrounded by 4 (or 5) pericentral cells of equal length and all elongate and of the same length. Corticating filaments grow down in the grooves between the pericentral cells. Rhizoids grow from the pericentral cells. Trichoblasts are numerous. Other similar species include: P. rhunensis Thuret et Bornet, P.orthocarpa Rosenvinge. P.sertularioides and P.sanguinea C.Agardh.

== Reproduction ==
The plants are dioecious and bear spermatangia near the apices of the branches. Cystocarps are ovoid or globular and tetrasporangia are formed in series near the apices.

== Habitat ==
Common on rocky shores both in the littoral to the sublittoral 10 m or more. Also grows epiphytically,

== Distribution ==
The species is widespread around Great Britain, including Shetland, and Ireland. In Europe it is recorded from Norway, the Baltic and France.
