= Brongniartella byssoides =

Scientific classification
- Domain: Eukaryota
- Clade: Archaeplastida
- Division: Rhodophyta
- Class: Florideophyceae
- Order: Ceramiales
- Family: Rhodomelaceae
- Genus: Brongniartella
- Species: B. byssoides

Binomial name
- Brongniartella byssoides (Goodenough & Woodward) F.Schmitz

Synonyms
- Vertebrata byssoides

Species of alga

Brongniartella byssoides is a small red marine alga.

== Description ==
Brongniartella byssoides is a small brownish-red marine alga which grows to a length of about 30 cm. It consists of tufts of erect axes. The erect axes are polysiphonous, that is each axes is composed of axial cells each covered with periaxial cells without cortication. All the branches produce secondary lateral branches which produce the ultimate final monosiphonous ramuli. The mature thallus pyramidal in shape. The plants are attacked by rhizoids with disc-like bases.

== Reproduction ==
The species is dioecious, the sexes occur on separate plants, with clusters of spermatangial branches, sessile cystocarps and tetrasporangia.

== Distribution ==
Widespread around the British Isles including the Isle of Man and the Shetland Islands. Recorded also from Norway to Portugal and the Mediterranean.
