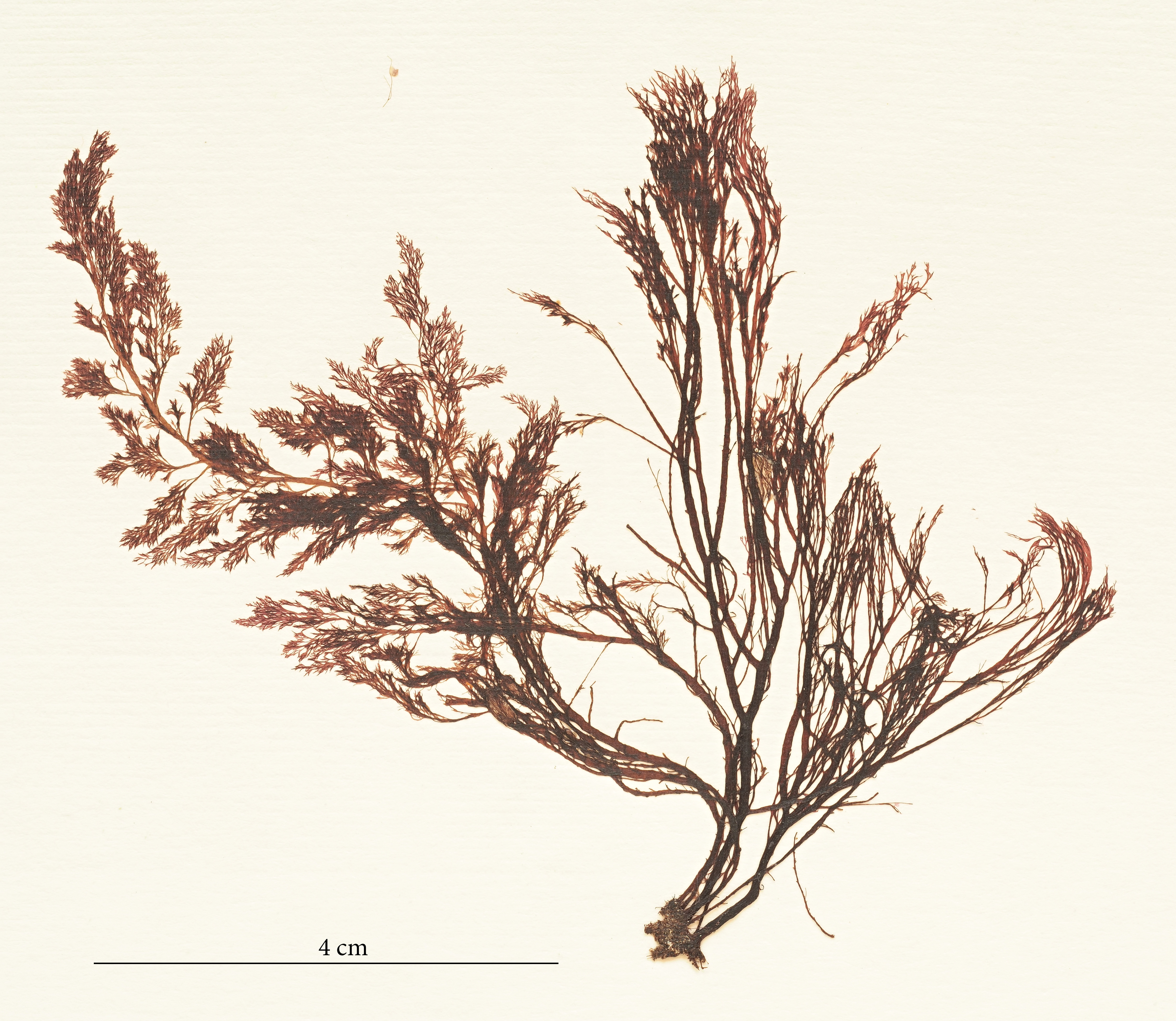
- herbarium specimen of Polysiphonia elongata

Scientific classification
- Clade: Archaeplastida
- Division: Rhodophyta
- Class: Florideophyceae
- Order: Ceramiales
- Family: Rhodomelaceae
- Genus: Polysiphonia
- Species: P. elongata

Binomial name
- Polysiphonia elongata (Hudson) Sprengel

= Polysiphonia elongata =

Species of alga

Polysiphonia elongata is a small red marine algae in the Rhodophyta.

== Description ==
Polysiphonia elongata is a small red alga which, unlike some other species of Polysiphonia, does not grow as tufts. It has erect cylindrical main branches and is densely branched growing to a height of 30 cm. The main branches bear lateral branches, each branch consists of a central axes of cells with four periaxial cells. These periaxial cells are arranged in an elongated manner all of the same length around the central axial cells. Cortical branches develop growing downwards in the grooves between the periaxial cells and increasing the thickness of the major branch. The final branches are pointed at the apex and attenuate at their base. Trichoblasts are few. It grows attached by a disk-like holdfast.

== Habitat ==
P. elongata grows intertidally and sublittorally on rock, stones and artificial material also on other algae.

== Reproduction ==
The plants are dioecious. Spermatangial branchlets are borne near the apices of young branches. Cystocarps are ovoid and slightly stalked. Tetraspores occur in spiral series in the upper branches.

== Distribution ==
P. elongata is common around Ireland, Great Britain including the Channel Islands, the Isle of Man and the Shetland Islands. In the Atlantic from Norway to the Mediterranean and in New England.
