= Polysiphonia atlantica =

Scientific classification
- Domain: Eukaryota
- Clade: Archaeplastida
- Division: Rhodophyta
- Class: Florideophyceae
- Order: Ceramiales
- Family: Rhodomelaceae
- Genus: Polysiphonia
- Species: P. atlantica

Binomial name
- Polysiphonia atlantica Kapraun & J.N.Norris

Species of alga

Polysiphonia atlantica is a small filamentous species of red marine algae Rhodophyta. The thalli form small tufts up to 3 cm long. The axes are ecorticate consisting of axial cells surrounded by four periaxial cells.

== Description ==
Polysiphonia atlantica is a small alga 3 cm high and dark reddish-brown in colour. It grows in tufts from prostrate axes producing numerous erect branches all growing to the similar lengths. The axial cells are surrounded by 4 periaxial cells which are elongate to the same length as the axial cells which are ecorticate. Attached by rhizoids produced by the periaxial cells.

== Reproduction ==
The life history is a sequence of three phases: gametangial, carposporangial and tetrasporangial. The plants are dioecious with spermatangial branchlets at the apices of the branches, cystocarps are slightly urceolate. The tetrasporangia occur the branches in a straight series.

== Habitat ==
Growing on rock, mussels other invertebrates or epiphytic. Between high and low water levels.

== Distribution ==
Records have been made from the British Isles- England, Ireland, Wales and Scotland, to Morocco, east coast of America and the Indian Ocean. Most of the records from the British Isles are probably those of Polysiphonia stricta.
