= Polysiphonia brodiei =

Scientific classification
- Domain: Eukaryota
- Clade: Archaeplastida
- Division: Rhodophyta
- Class: Florideophyceae
- Order: Ceramiales
- Family: Rhodomelaceae
- Genus: Polysiphonia
- Species: P. brodiei

Binomial name
- Polysiphonia brodiei (Dillwyn) Sprengel

Synonyms
- Polysiphonia brodiaei orth. var.

Species of alga

Polysiphonia brodiei (Dillwyn) Sprengel, now generally spelled "brodiaei", as it is named after James Brodie is a species of red algae in the Rhodophyta. It grows in tufts up to 36 cm long.

== Description ==
Polysiphonia brodiaei is a dark brownish purple algae growing as tufts consisting of branched of axial cells surrounded by 6 - 8 periaxial cells all of the same length. These branches become corticated near the base. Trichoblasts form near the tip and branches develop from their axils. It grows to 36 cm long in dense tufts.

== Reproduction ==
The plants are dioecious, Spermatangial branchlets are borne near the tips of the branches. Cystocarps with a wide ostiole develop and Tetrasporangia appear as a spiral in the branches.

== Habitat ==
Common in the intertidal zone.

== Distribution ==
This species is recorded from all around the British Isles, except in the east of England, including the Isle of Man and the Shetland Isles. In Europe the species is found From Norway to Portugal, in the Mediterranean, the Atlantic coast of Canada and also on the Pacific coast of North America and in Australia and New Zealand.
