= Polysiphonia devoniensis =

Scientific classification
- Clade: Archaeplastida
- Division: Rhodophyta
- Class: Florideophyceae
- Order: Ceramiales
- Family: Rhodomelaceae
- Genus: Polysiphonia
- Species: P. devoniensis

Binomial name
- Polysiphonia devoniensis Maggs & Hommersand

Species of alga

Polysiphonia devoniensis is a species of marine algae. It is a small red alga in the Division Rhodophyta. It is a species new to science only described recently and first published in 1993.

== Description ==
Polysiphonia devoniensis grows as a tuft of erect, fine, terete branches up to 2.5 cm long and brown in colour. Each branch consists of an axis of central cells surrounded by 4 perixial cells, all of the same length surrounding the central cells and are ecorticate. Trichoblasts are formed near the tips of the branches and rhizoids grow from the periaxial cells of the prostrate axes and trichoblasts from the apex. The rhizoids remain open with the periaxial cells.

== Reproduction ==
The plants are dioecious. Spermatangia are borne in loose clusters in clusters. The cystocarps are ovoid or round or slightly urceolate with a large ostiole. The tetrasporangia occur spiral series in the branches.

== Distribution ==
Recorded from three counties of the south of England: Dorset, Devon and Cornwall, with one record from Wales.
