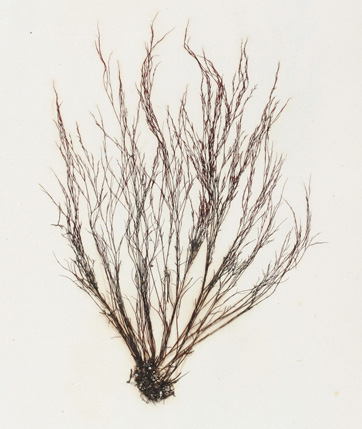

Scientific classification
- Clade: Archaeplastida
- Division: Rhodophyta
- Class: Florideophyceae
- Order: Ceramiales
- Family: Rhodomelaceae
- Genus: Polysiphonia
- Species: P. nigra

Binomial name
- Polysiphonia nigra (Hudson) Batters

= Polysiphonia nigra =

Species of alga

Polysiphonia nigra is a species of marine alga in the division Rhodophyta.

== Description ==
Polysiphonia nigra is a relatively small red algae which grows to a height of 20 or 30 cm. It consists of tufts of branched axes. The branches are cylindrical and erect, consisting of large axial cells forming about one third of the diameter of the branch, surrounded by periaxial cells in a collar around the axis, each cell of the same length, generally 9 - 13 in number. Cortication absent. Attached by rhizoids.

== Reproduction ==
The plants are dioecious with spermatrangial branchlets borne near the apices of the branches. Cystocarps are globular with a small ostiole. Tetrasporangia are arranged in short lateral branches.

== Distribution ==
Generally to be found around the British Isles and in Europe from Norway to Portugal. In America - Newfoundland to New Jersey.
