= List of shipwrecks in September 1835 =

The list of shipwrecks in September 1835 includes ships sunk, foundered, wrecked, grounded or otherwise lost during September 1835.

== 1 September ==
List of shipwrecks: 1 September 1835
Ship	State	Description
Blackamoor	United Kingdom	The ship was driven ashore in the Miramichi River, British North America.
Jacob Cornelis	Austrian Empire	The ship was in collision with Horn (United Kingdom) in the Gulf of Piran and sank with the loss of a crew member.
Lonach	United Kingdom	The ship was wrecked near Saugor, India. Her crew survived.
Majestic	United Kingdom	The ship ran aground in the Mississippi, United States.

== 3 September ==
List of shipwrecks: 3 September 1835
Ship	State	Description
Gold Hunter	(United Kingdom of Great Britain and Ireland) Saint Vincent	The sloop was wrecked in a hurricane at Barbados. Her crew were rescued.
Lady Lyon	(United Kingdom of Great Britain and Ireland) Barbados	The mail boat capszied and sank in a hurricane at Barbados with the loss of all but one of her crew.
Miriam and Jane	United Kingdom	The ship was wrecked on Key Coker. She was on a voyage from British Honduras to Cork.
Nancy and Mary	(United Kingdom of Great Britain and Ireland) Barbados	The mail boat was driven ashore in a hurricane at Barbados.
Placid	(United Kingdom of Great Britain and Ireland) Barbados	The mail boat was driven ashore in a hurricane at Barbados.
Thomas Parker	(United Kingdom of Great Britain and Ireland) Barbados	The ship was driven ashore and wrecked in a hurricane at Saint Lucia.

== 5 September ==
List of shipwrecks: 5 September 1835
Ship	State	Description
Alpha	(United Kingdom of Great Britain and Ireland) Antigua	The drogher was wrecked at Nonsuch Harbour, Antigua.
Lyra	United Kingdom	The ship was abandoned in the Atlantic Ocean (45°N 53°W). She was on a voyage from London to Quebec City, Lower Canada, British North America.
Stree Jugadeesworn Swamy	India	The brig was wrecked 8 nautical miles (15 km) north of Bimlipatam with the loss of 41 of the 42 people on board.

== 7 September ==
List of shipwrecks: 7 September 1835
Ship	State	Description
Ocean	United Kingdom	The ship was lost in the Bay of Seven Islands. She was on a voyage from Quebec City, Lower Canada, British North America to London.

== 8 September ==
List of shipwrecks: 8 September 1835
Ship	State	Description
Felix	France	The ship was wrecked on Cape Trafalgar, Spain. She was on a voyage from Marseille, Bouches-du-Rhône to Nantes, Loire-Inférieure.

== 9 September ==
List of shipwrecks: 9 September 1835
Ship	State	Description
Lady Neville	United Kingdom	The ship was lost in the North Sea. Her crew were rescued. She was on a voyage from Newcastle upon Tyne, Northumberland to Sandwich, Kent.

== 10 September ==
List of shipwrecks: 10 September 1835
Ship	State	Description
Brothers	United Kingdom	The ship was wrecked east of Port Isaac, Cornwall.
Newgrove	United Kingdom	The sloop was driven ashore and wrecked at Belfast, County Antrim.
Plutarch	United States	The ship was wrecked near Holyhead, Anglesey, United Kingdom. Her eleven crew were rescued by the Cemlyn Lifeboat. She was on a voyage from New Orleans, Louisiana to Liverpool, Lancashire, United Kingdom.
Sarah	United Kingdom	The ship was wrecked in Carnarvon Bay. Her crew were rescued. She was on a voyage from Liverpool to Demerara.

== 11 September ==
List of shipwrecks: 11 September 1835
Ship	State	Description
Charles	United Kingdom	The sloop sank in the River Usk at Newport, Monmouthshire.
Frederycka	Sweden	The ship foundered in the North Sea off the coast of Jutland. Her crew were rescued. She was on a voyage from Ostend, West Flanders, Belgium to Kristianstad.
Jane and Henry	(United Kingdom of Great Britain and Ireland) Cape Colony	The schooner was wrecked in the Torres Strait (12°10′S 140°11′E). Her eleven crew survived. She was on a voyage from Sydney, New South Wales to Batavia, Netherlands East Indies.
Latona	United Kingdom	The ship sprang a leak and was abandoned in the Atlantic Ocean. Her crew were rescued by Olga (United Kingdom). Latona was on a voyage from Padstow, Cornwall to Quebec City, Lower Canada, British North America.
Johns	United Kingdom	The ship was wrecked on the Little Burbo Bank, in Liverpool Bay. She was on a voyage from Dundalk, County Louth to the River Ribble. The upturned hull was beached near formby, Lancashire on 18 September.
Robert Francis	United Kingdom	The ship foundered in the North Sea off Southwold, Suffolk. Her crew were rescued. She was on a voyage from South Shields, County Durham to London.
Sarah Jane	United Kingdom	The schooner was driven ashore and wrecked at "Cornel", Pas-de-Calais, France. She was on a voyage from Sierra Leone to London.

== 15 September ==
List of shipwrecks: 15 September 1835
Ship	State	Description
Lafayette	United States	The ship was wrecked 50 nautical miles (93 km) south of Cape Canaveral, Florida.
Majestic	United Kingdom	The ship was wrecked at Key West, Florida, United States. She was on a voyage from New Orleans, Louisiana, United States to Liverpool, Lancashire.
Noble	United States	The ship was wrecked 100 nautical miles (190 km) south of Cape Canaveral. Her crew were rescued.

== 16 September ==
List of shipwrecks: 16 September 1835
Ship	State	Description
Gil Blas	Spain	The ship was driven ashore and wrecked near Cape Florida, United States. She was on a voyage from Havana, Cuba to a Spanish port.
Thomas	United Kingdom	The ship was wrecked on Indian Key. She was on a voyage from Laguna, Texas, United States to Liverpool, Lancashire.

== 17 September ==
List of shipwrecks: 17 September 1835
Ship	State	Description
Gironde	France	The steamship departed from Bordeaux, Gironde for Cette, Hérault. No further trace, presumed foundered with the loss of all hands.
Thomas Wallace	United Kingdom	The ship was wrecked on the west coast of Anticosti Island, She was on a voyage from Quebec City, Lower Canada, British North America to London.

== 18 September ==
List of shipwrecks: 18 September 1835
Ship	State	Description
Conde Villanova	Cuba	The ship was wrecked near "Cape Augustin", Florida, United States. She was on a voyage from Charleston, South Carolina, United States to Havana.
Cora	United Kingdom	The ship was wrecked on the English Bank, in the Atlantic Ocean off the coast of Uruguay. Her crew survived. She was on a voyage from Liverpool, Lancashire to Buenos Aires, Argentina.

== 19 September ==
List of shipwrecks: 19 September 1835
Ship	State	Description
HMS Cleopatra	Royal Navy	The Vestal-class frigate ran aground off Læsø, Denmark. Her guns were transferred to HNLMS Ypres (Royal Netherlands Navy) in order to lighten her and she was refloated.

== 20 September ==
List of shipwrecks: 20 September 1835
Ship	State	Description
Aurora	Prussia	The ship was driven ashore in Sandwich Bay.
Belissima	Grand Duchy of Tuscany	The brig was wrecked on The Saintes Rocks, off Finistère, France. All on board were rescued. She was on a voyage from Livorno to London, United Kingdom.
Eliza	United Kingdom	The ship was wrecked 16 nautical miles (30 km) below Petit-Métis, Lower Canada, British North America. She was on a voyage from Quebec City, Lower Canada to London.
London	United Kingdom	London The paddle steamer caught fire at Cleethorpes, Lincolnshire.

== 21 September ==
List of shipwrecks: 21 September 1835
Ship	State	Description
Hunter	United Kingdom	The brig was wrecked on Saint Paul Island, Nova Scotia, British North America. Her eight crew were rescued by Nicholas (United Kingdom). Hunter was on a voyage from Liverpool, Lancashire to Bathurst, New Brunswick, British North America.
Rudolph	United Kingdom	The ship sprang a leak and was beached on Schiermonnikoog, Friesland, Netherlands. Her crew were rescued. She was on a voyage from Newry, County Antrim to Newcastle upon Tyne, Northumberland.
Washington	United States	The ship capsized in a squall off Cape Cod, Massachusetts with the loss of all but one of her crew. She was on a voyage from Boston, Massachusetts to Cádiz, Spain.

== 22 September ==
List of shipwrecks: 22 September 1835
Ship	State	Description
Brothers	United Kingdom	The ship foundered in the Atlantic Ocean off the Inishtrahull Lighthouse, County Donegal with the loss of a crew member. Survivors reached "Scarbro Island" two days later, from where they were rescued by Helen McGregor (United Kingdom): Brothers was on a voyage from Galway to Belfast, County Antrim.
Eliza	United Kingdom	The sloop was driven ashore and wrecked at Isleornsay, Inner Hebrides. She was on a voyage from the Orkney Islands to Glasgow, Renfrewshire.
Eliza and Catherine	(United Kingdom of Great Britain and Ireland) Isle of Man	The ship was driven ashore at the mouth of Loch Indaal and subsequently became a wreck. She was on a voyage from Castletown to Glasgow.
Henry and William	United Kingdom	The brig was driven ashore and wrecked at Isleornsay. She was on a voyage from Aberdeen to "Corpack".
Marmaduke	United Kingdom	The ship foundered in the North Sea 25 nautical miles (46 km) off Buchan Ness, Aberdeenshire. Her three crew were rescued by Isabella (United Kingdom). Marmaduke was on a voyage from Sunderland, County Durham to Macduff, Aberdeenshire.

== 23 September ==
List of shipwrecks: 23 September 1835
Ship	State	Description
Brothers	United Kingdom	The brig was driven ashore in Brondsea Bay and severely damaged. She was later refloated and taken in to Stornoway, Inner Hebrides.
Diligence	United Kingdom	The ship was driven ashore in Dundrum Bay.
Hendry	United Kingdom	The ship was driven ashore and wrecked at Wick, Caithness.

== 24 September ==
List of shipwrecks: 24 September 1835
Ship	State	Description
Venus	United Kingdom	The ship struck rocks at Lochalsh, Argyllshire and was wrecked.

== 27 September ==
List of shipwrecks: 27 September 1835
Ship	State	Description
Adolph Frederick	(Russian Empire) Grand Duchy of Finland	The ship ran aground on the Naas Reef. She was on a voyage from London, United Kingdom to Pori. Adolph Frederick was refloated on 19 October and taken in to Visby, Swede.
Eliza	United Kingdom	The ship was driven ashore in West Bay, Dorset. Her crew were rescued. She was on a voyage from Weymouth to Bridport, Dorset.
Neptune	United Kingdom	The brig was driven ashore and wrecked in Poolslaughter Bay, near St. Gowan's Head, Pembrokeshire with the loss of seven of the eight people on board.
Pomone	France	The ship was in collision with another vessel and sank in the North Sea off Hamburg. Her crew were rescued. She was on a voyage from Havre de Grâce, Seine-Inférieure to Riga, Russia.
Zephyr	United Kingdom	The ship struck the pier and was wrecked at Newhaven, Sussex. She was on a voyage from Newhaven to Swansea, Glamorgan.

== 28 September ==
List of shipwrecks: 28 September 1835
Ship	State	Description
Athol	United Kingdom	The steamship foundered in the North Sea 6 nautical miles (11 km) south of Coquet Island, Northumberland. All on board were rescued by the smack Flora (United Kingdom). Athol was on a voyage from Dundee, Forfarshire to London.
Christian Eugene	Sweden	The ship sprang a leak and foundered in the North Sea. Her crew were rescued. She was on a voyage from "La Mata" to Gothenburg.
Concordia	France	The ship departed from Marseille, Bouches-du-Rhône for Boston, Massachusetts. No further trace, presumed foundered with the loss of all hands.
Francis	United Kingdom	The ship was driven ashore at Ballyteague, County Galway. She was on a voyage from Newfoundland, British North America to Liverpool, Lancashire.
Irton	United Kingdom	The ship was wrecked in the Straits of Belle Isle. She was on a voyage from Quebec City, Lower Canada, British North America to Liverpool.
St. Leonard	United Kingdom	The ship was abandoned in the Atlantic Ocean (46°N 55°W). Her crew were rescued by Severn (United Kingdom). St. Leonard was on a voyage from Quebec City to Liverpool.
Trader	United Kingdom	The ship was lost off Götaland, Sweden.

== 29 September ==
List of shipwrecks: 29 September 1835
Ship	State	Description
Andromeda	United Kingdom	The ship was abandoned in the Atlantic Ocean. She was on a voyage from Quebec City, Lower Canada, British North America to South Shields, County Durham.
Amelia	United Kingdom	The ship was wrecked in Trinity Bay, Newfoundland, British North America. She was on a voyage from London to Métis-sur-Mer, Lower Canada, British North America.
Echo	United Kingdom	The ship arrived at Great Yarmouth, Norfolk from Sunderland, County Durham in a leaky condition and consequently sank.
Gluck	Hamburg	The ship sprang a leak and was beached on Lavenscar Island. She was on a voyage from Saint Petersburg, Russian Empire to Grimsby, Lincolnshire, United Kingdom.
Harrys	United Kingdom	The brig was driven ashore and wrecked at Ardglass, County Down. Her five crew were rescued. She was on a voyage from Beaumaris, Anglesey to Belfast, County Antrim.
Pannier	United Kingdom	The ship was wrecked at the mouth of the Saint Lawrence River. Her crew were rescued.
Sophia	United Kingdom	The ship was abandoned in the Atlantic Ocean (39°N 65°W). Her crew were rescued by Favourite (United Kingdom). She was on a voyage from Saint John, New Brunswick to Jamaica.
Thetis	United Kingdom	The ship was wrecked on Corvo Island, Azores, Portugal. Her crew were rescued. She was on a voyage from Montevideo, Uruguay to the Isles of Scilly and Liverpool.

== 30 September ==
List of shipwrecks: 30 September 1835
Ship	State	Description
Ann	United Kingdom	The ship foundered in the North Sea off Southwold, Suffolk. Her crew survived.
Ann and Ellen	United Kingdom	The ship was driven ashore at Ramsey, Isle of Man. She was on a voyage from Gloucester to Glasgow, Renfrewshire.
Christopher	United Kingdom	The ship was abandoned in the North See off Goree, South Holland, Netherlands. Her crew were rescued by Glasgow Merchant (United Kingdom). Christopher was on a voyage from Newcastle upon Tyne, Northumberland to Rotterdam, South Holland.
Friends	United Kingdom	The ship was driven ashore and wrecked at Cocagne, New Brunswick, British North America.
Maria	United Kingdom	The ship was wrecked on Anticosti Island, Lower Canada, British North America. Her crew were rescued. She was on a voyage from Quebec City to Sunderland, County Durham.
Mary Ann	United States	The whaler was abandoned in the Atlantic Ocean (38°00′N 64°30′W). Her crew were rescued by Birmingham (flag unknown).
Ocean	United Kingdom	The ship was lost in the Bay of Seven Islands. Her crew were rescued. She was on a voyage from Quebec City, Lower Canada, British North America to London.
Solway	United Kingdom	The steamship ran aground on the Swelly Rock. Her crew were rescued. She was on a voyage from Liverpool, Lancashire to Drogheda, County Louth. Solway was later refloated but sank on another rock nearer the coast of Anglesey.

== Unknown date ==
List of shipwrecks: Unknown date 1835
Ship	State	Description
Adventurer	(United Kingdom of Great Britain and Ireland) New South Wales	The cutter was wrecked in the Manning River before 16 September.
Angelica	Portugal	The ship was wrecked near Rio Grande do Sul, Brazil. She was on a voyage from Porto to Porto Alegre, Brazil.
Atherton	United Kingdom	The ship was driven ashore on the Isle of Dogs, Essex. She was on a voyage from Calcutta, India to London.
Brisk	(United Kingdom of Great Britain and Ireland) Antigua	The drogher was driven ashore and wrecked in Antigua.
Eleanor	United Kingdom	The ship was wrecked on Anticosti Island, Quebec City, Lower Canada, British North America before 1 October.
Fame	United Kingdom	The collier foundered in the North Sea before 24 September. Four survivors were rescued by the whaler Père de Famille (France). Fame was on a voyage from Newcastle upon Tyne, Northumberland to Great Yarmouth, Norfolk.
Isabella	United Kingdom	The ship was driven ashore on Islay. She was on a voyage from North Uist, Outer Hebrides to Liverpool, Lancashire.
Lady Neville	United Kingdom	The ship was wrecked on the Goodwin Sands, in the English Channel off the coast of Kent, before 11 September. Her crew were rescued. She was on a voyage from Newcastle upon Tyne to Sandwich, Kent.
Lycurgus	United Kingdom	The ship departed from an African port for Liverpool. No further trace, presumed foundered with the loss of all hands.
Marquis	United Kingdom	The ship was driven ashore on Jura before 24 September. She was on a voyage from North Uist to Liverpool.
Royal Mint	United Kingdom	The ship was driven ashore at Egremont, Cumberland. She was on a voyage from Jamaica to Liverpool.
