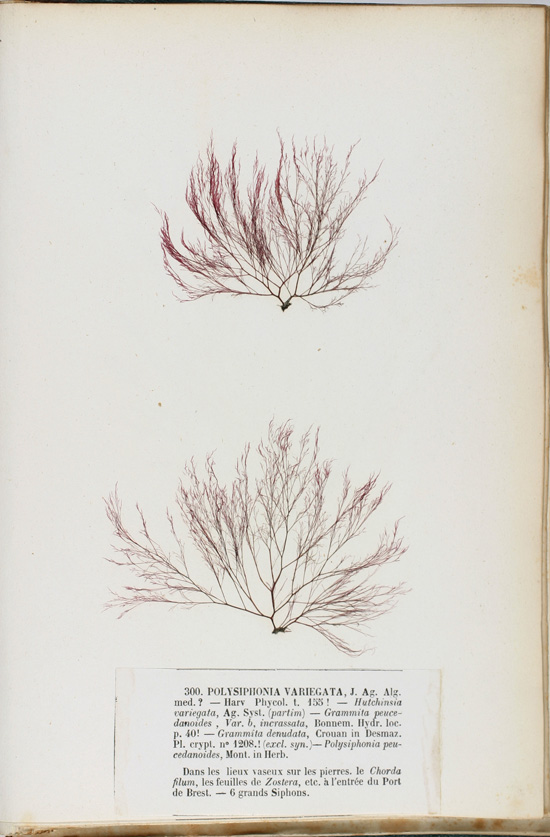
- Polysiphonia denudata specimine

Scientific classification
- Domain: Eukaryota
- Clade: Archaeplastida
- Division: Rhodophyta
- Class: Florideophyceae
- Order: Ceramiales
- Family: Rhodomelaceae
- Genus: Polysiphonia
- Species: P. denudata

Binomial name
- Polysiphonia denudata (Dillwyn) Greville ex Harvey

= Polysiphonia denudata =

Species of alga

Polysiphonia denudata (Polysiphonia variegate (C.Agardh) Zanardini) is a small red alga, Rhodophyta, growing as tufts up to 20 cm long without a main branch axis.

== Description ==
Polysiphonia denudata is erect with repeatedly branched axes. Each branch consists of a central axis with 5 to 7 elongated pericentral cells all of the same length. Cortication occurs lower down, these corticating cells grow down in the grooves between the pericentral cells. The holdfast is discoid.

== Reproduction ==
The plants are dioecious. They bear spermatangia towards the tips of branches. Cystocarps are barrel-shaped when mature borne on a wide short stalk. Tetrasporangia occur in a spiral series in the branches near the tips.

== Habitat ==
The alga is very rare, grows on rock, stones or other large algae in the low-littoral or below in sheltered sites.

== Distribution ==
Reported from the north of Ireland in 1847, the specimen is in store in the Ulster Museum, Belfast in England from the south coast, Scottish records considered misidentifications, Netherlands to Portugal and West Africa. The Mediterranean and west Atlantic.

== Further References ==
Bunker, F.StP.D., Maggs, C.A., Brodie, J.A., Bunker, A.R. 2017. Seaweeds of Britain and Ireland. Second Edition. Wild Nature Press, Plymouth. UK. ISBN 978-0-9955673-3-7
