= Brongniartella =

Brongniartella is the scientific name of two genera of organisms and may refer to:

- Brongniartella (alga), a genus of red algae in the family Rhodomelaceae
- Brongniartella (trilobite), a genus of trilobites in the family Homalonotidae
