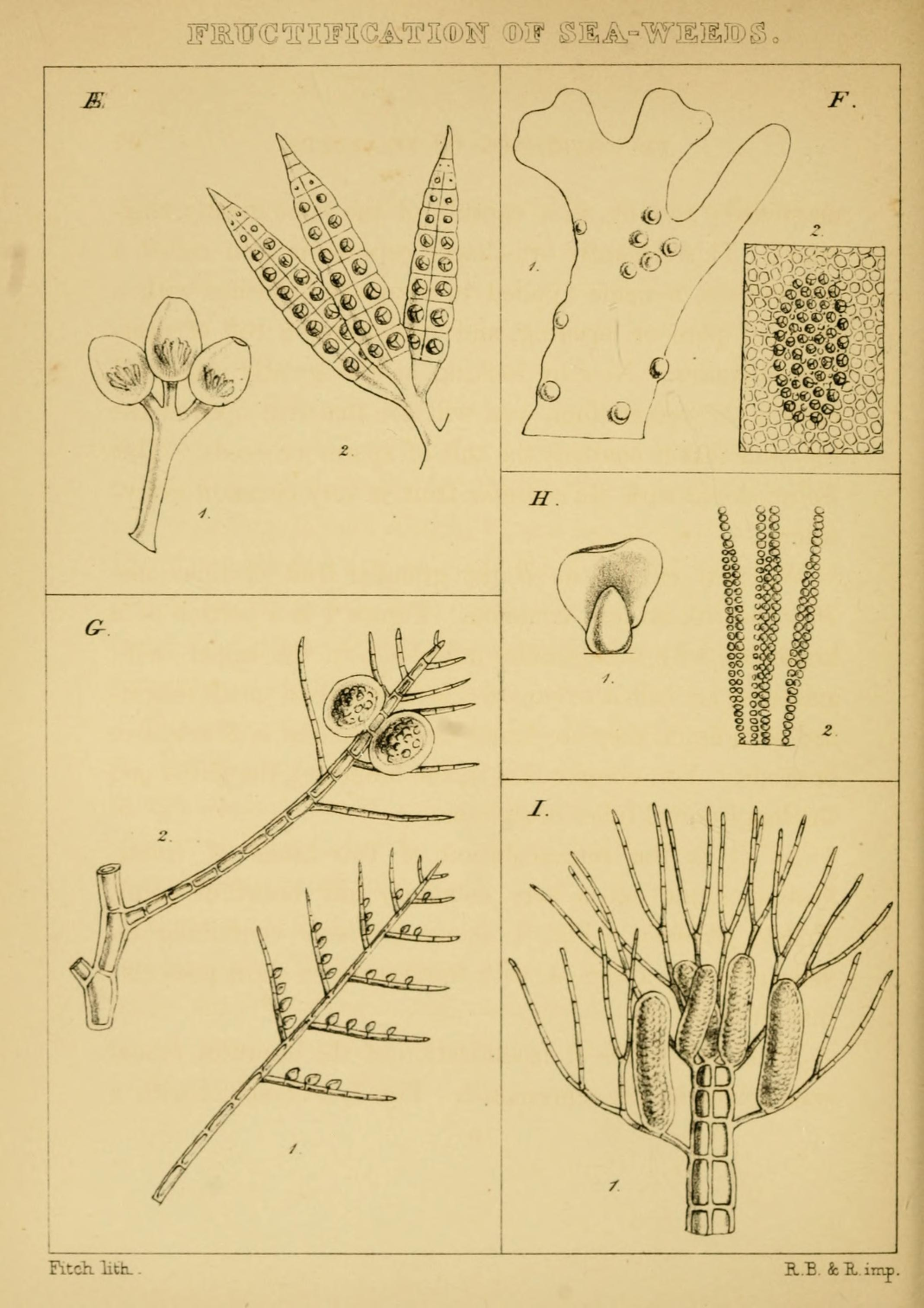
- Polysiphonia fibrata

Scientific classification
- Domain: Eukaryota
- Clade: Archaeplastida
- Division: Rhodophyta
- Class: Florideophyceae
- Order: Ceramiales
- Family: Rhodomelaceae
- Genus: Polysiphonia
- Species: P. fibrata

Binomial name
- Polysiphonia fibrata (Dillwyn) Harvey in W.J.Hooker

= Polysiphonia fibrata =

Species of alga

Polysiphonia fibrata is a species of Polysiphonia that grows as small dense tufted and finely branched marine alga in the Rhodophyta.

== Description ==
The branches of P. fibrate are numerous and much interwoven forming tufts up to 20 cm long. They are fine, terete, cylindrical, erect and dull brownish-red in colour. The branches consist of a central axis with 4 pericentral cells all of the same length as the axial cells. The branches become corticated near the base. Rhizoids and trichoblasts are abundant.

== Reproduction ==
The plants are dioecious. Spermatangia are borne near the tips of the branches. The cystocarps are clearly shortly stalked. Tetrasporangia are formed in the branches near the tips.

== Habitat ==
To be found on rock, limpets, mussels and on other algae in rock pools at mid-tide and low water.

== Distribution ==
Common around Britain including Shetland and Ireland. Also recorded from Spain, and France.

== Note ==
Other species are similar to P. fibrata and difficult to distinguish.
