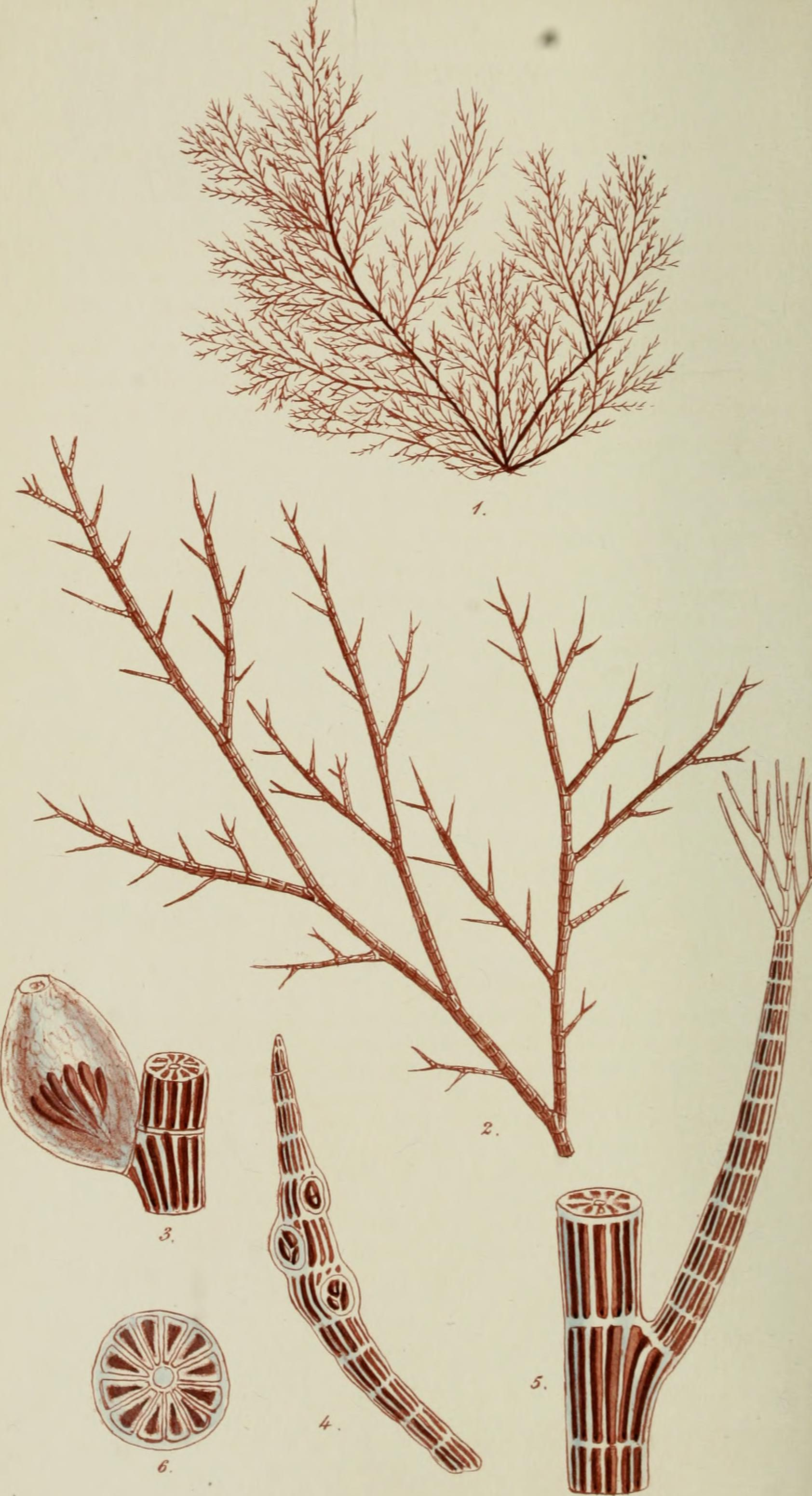
- Illustration of Polysiphonia simulans. Fig. 1. natural size. 2. A small branch. 3. Ceramidium. 4. Ramulus with imbedded tetraspores. 5. Joints from the stem, and young ramulus with apical fibres. 6. Transverse section of the stem : — all magnified.

Scientific classification
- Clade: Archaeplastida
- Division: Rhodophyta
- Class: Florideophyceae
- Order: Ceramiales
- Family: Rhodomelaceae
- Genus: Polysiphonia
- Species: P. simulans

Binomial name
- Polysiphonia simulans Harvey

= Polysiphonia simulans =

Species of alga

Polysiphonia simulans is a small marine alga in the division Rhodophyta.

== Description ==
This small alga is no more than 8 cm long. It appears as a tuft of irregularly branched erect axes. The branches show 10 periaxial cells forming a collar around a central axis without cortication. The pericentral cells are all of the same length. Rhizoids are attached to the lower periaxial cells.

== Reproduction ==
Tetraspores have been recorded in the final branches.

== Distribution ==
Recorded from the south coast of England, Ireland and the Channel Islands. Also recorded from north-west France. Occurs southwards to Morocco.
