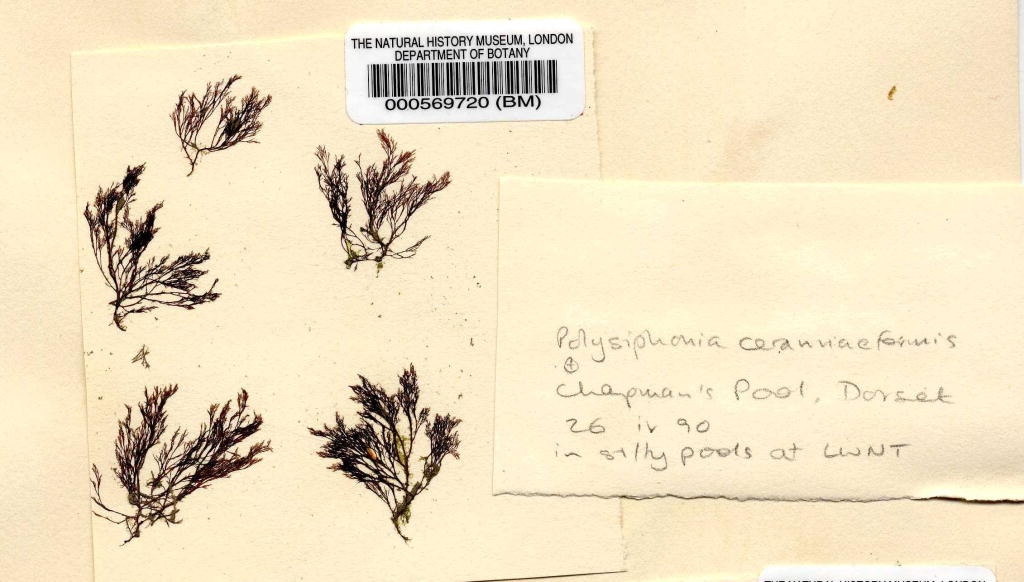
- Samples of Polysiphonia ceramiaeformis algae

Scientific classification
- Clade: Archaeplastida
- Division: Rhodophyta
- Class: Florideophyceae
- Order: Ceramiales
- Family: Rhodomelaceae
- Genus: Polysiphonia
- Species: P. ceramiaeformis

Binomial name
- Polysiphonia ceramiaeformis P.Crouan & H.Crouan

= Polysiphonia ceramiaeformis =

Species of alga

Polysiphonia ceramiaeformis, also called banded siphon weed, is a small red algae (Rhodophyta), in the genus Polysiphonia. Individuals are irregularly branched with the branches extending up to 5.5 centimetres (2.2 in) from a central node and ending in dense tufts of fibres.

== Description ==
This small red algae lacks a clearly to be seen main axis. Each branch is formed of axial cells with 10 - 12 periaxial cells of equal length, with forcipate incurved tips. It is densely branched and attached by tangled prostrate axes. All axes are ecorticate. The rhizoids are numerous

== Reproduction ==
The plants are dioecious. The alga bears spermatangial branches on a cylindrical axis. Cystocarps are oval with a narrow ostiole. The tetraspores cells divide to forms cells in fours, these occur in a spiral series.

== Habitat ==
In pools at low water in sheltered sites.

== Distribution ==
Very rare on the British Isles. Recorded from a few sites in Dorset, also recorded from north west France and the Mediterranean.
