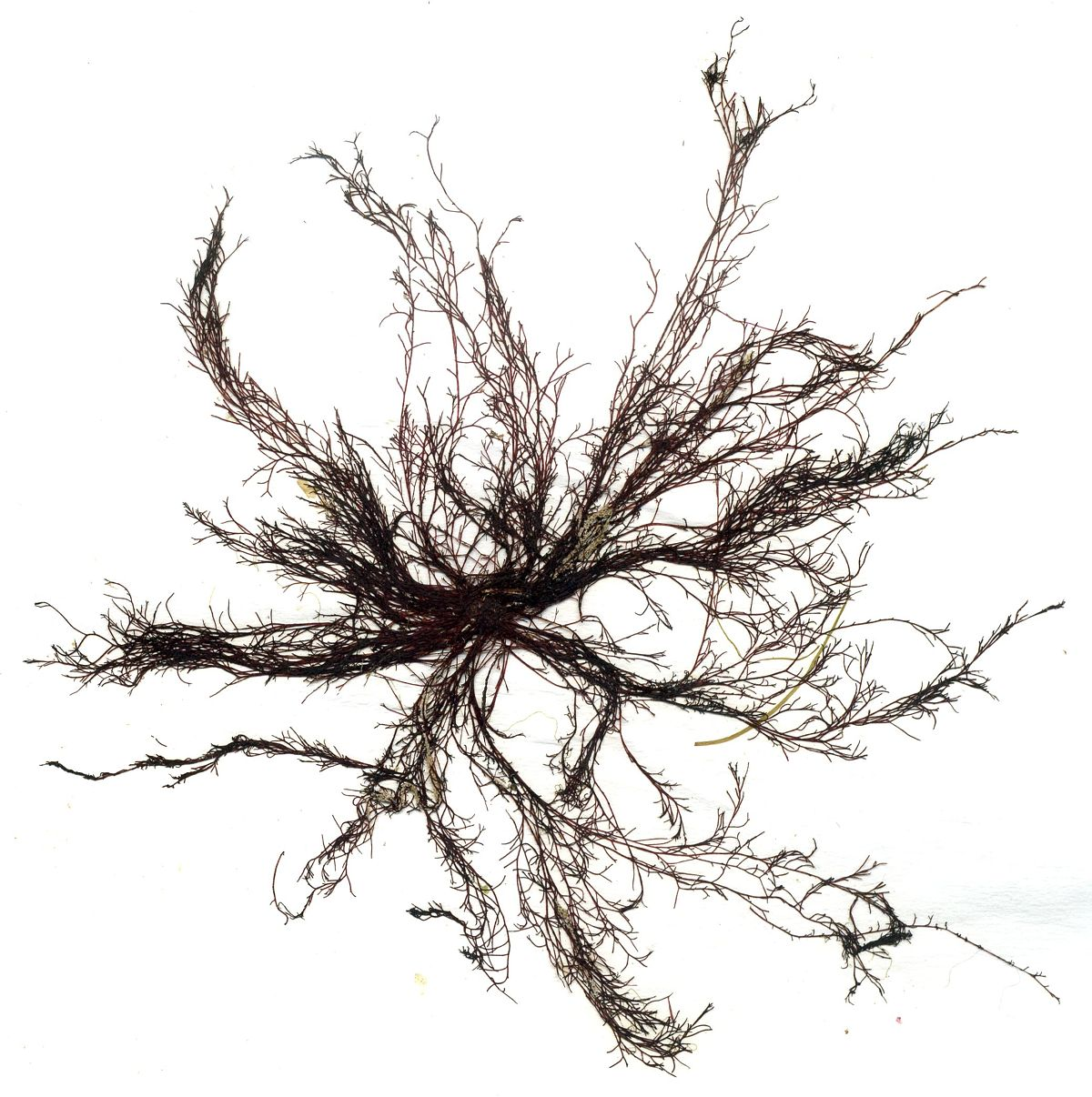

Scientific classification
- Domain: Eukaryota
- Clade: Archaeplastida
- Division: Rhodophyta
- Class: Florideophyceae
- Order: Ceramiales
- Family: Rhodomelaceae
- Genus: Polysiphonia
- Species: P. stricta

Binomial name
- Polysiphonia stricta (Dillwyn) Greville

Synonyms
- Conferva urceolata Lightfoot ex Dillwyn 1809; Conferva patens Dillwyn 1809; Conferva stricta Mertens ex Dillwyn 1804; Ceramium strictum (Mertens ex Dillwyn) Poiret 1811; Hutchinsia abyssina Lyngbye 1880; Hutchinsia comosa C.Agardh 1824; Hutchinsia roseola C.Agardh 1828; Hutchinsia stricta (Mertens ex Dillwyn) C.Agardh 1817; Hutchinsia urceolata (Lightfoot ex Dillwyn) Lyngbye 1819; Polysiphonia formosa Suhr 1831; Polysiphonia patens (Dillwyn) Harvey 1833; Polysiphonia pulvinata Liebmann 1845; Polysiphonia roseola (C.Agardh) Fries 1835; Polysiphonia spiralis L.Batten 1923; Polysiphonia urceolata (Lightfoot ex Dillwyn) Greville 1824; Polysiphonia urceolata f. comosa (C.Agardh) J.Agardh 1863; Polysiphonia urceolata f. formosa (Suhr) J.Agardh 1863; Polysiphonia urceolata f. pulvinata Kylin 1907; Polysiphonia urceolata f. roseola (C.Agardh) J.Agardh 1863; Polysiphonia urceolata f. typica Kjellman 1883

= Polysiphonia stricta =

Species of alga

Polysiphonia stricta is a small red marine alga in the Division Rhodophyta.

Polysiphonia stricta forms dense clumps of branching axes. The plants grow to 25 cm high.

== Description ==
P. stricta grows as small tufts of much branched tufts, growing to no more than 25 cm high. The axes are erect, ecorticate, with 4 periaxial cells growing from prostrate axes. All 4 of the periaxial cells are of the same length.

== Reproduction ==
Spermatangial branchlets are formed in clusters at the apices. Cystocarps are on wide stalks and are urceolate. The tetraspores are in series in the final branches.

== Habitat ==
Epizoic and epiphytic in the low littoral to 20 m.

== Distribution ==
Found around the British Isles, the West Atlantic and American Atlantic.
