= Inishtrahull =

Island off Malin Head, Ireland

Inishtrahull Inis Trá Tholl
- Island
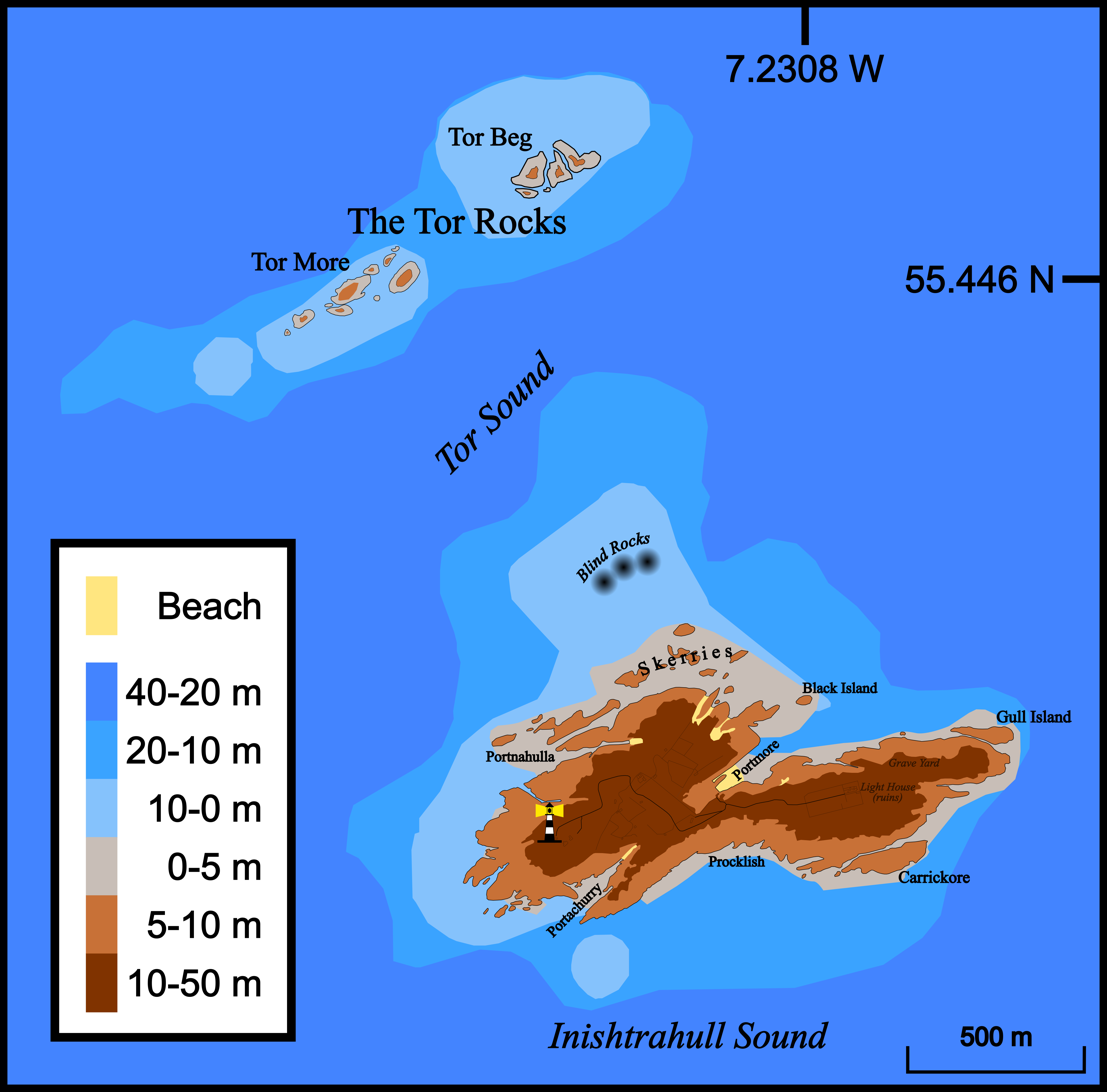

- Location in Ireland
- Coordinates: 55°25′54″N 7°14′16″W
- Sovereign state: Ireland
- Province: Ulster
- County: County Donegal

Area
  - Total: 0.34 km^{2} (0.13 sq mi)
- Elevation: 49 m (161 ft)

Population (2011)
  - Total: 0
  - Density: 0.0/km^{2} (0.0/sq mi)
- Irish Grid Reference: C439548

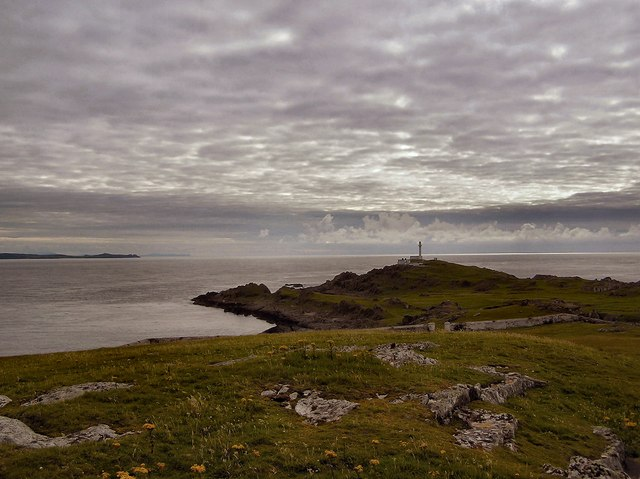
The lighthouse on Inishtrahull

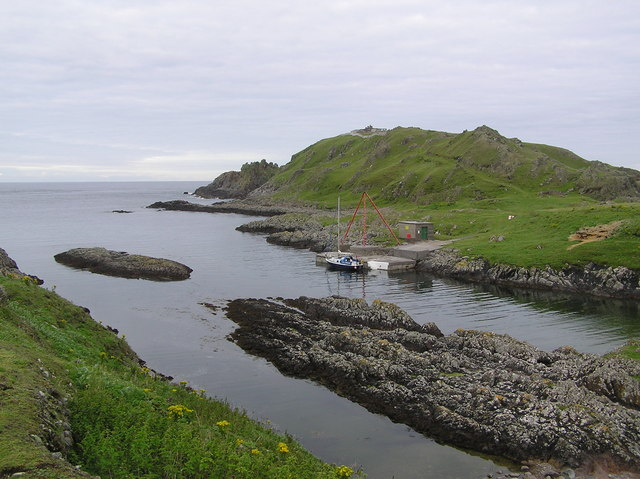
Landing place on Inishtrahull

Inishtrahull (Irish: Inis Trá Tholl, possibly "island of the empty beach" or "island of the yonder beach") is the most northerly island of Ireland. It has an area of 34 hectares (84 acres) and lies about ten kilometres (five nautical miles) northeast of Malin Head, County Donegal, and just over fifty kilometres (twenty-seven nautical miles) southwest of the island of Orsay, in the Inner Hebrides of Scotland. The most northerly landfall of Ireland, the Tor Beg rock, is another kilometre (0.6 miles) to the north. Inishtrahull is home to Ireland's northernmost lighthouse. The island had a resident community until 1929 and the lighthouse was staffed until 1987. Today it is uninhabited and has been designated a protected area due to its wildlife.

== Geology ==
The island is formed of a granitic gneiss, a type of metamorphic rock, which is known as Inishtrahull Gneiss. It is dated at 1.7 billion years old, making it Paleoproterozoic in age, and is the oldest known rock on the Irish Islands. The Inishtrahull Gneiss is considered to form part of the Rhinns complex that is also exposed on the islands of Islay and Colonsay. The Rhinns complex is correlated with the Ketilidian metamorphic belt of southern Greenland and the Svecofennian of Scandinavia.

== Flora and fauna ==
Among the algae present at Inishtrahull, Bonnemaisonia asparagoides, Callophyllis laciniata, Kalymenia reniformis, Sphaerococcus coronopifolius, Lomentaria articulate, L. orcadensis, Rhodymenia pseudopalmata, Plumaria plumose, Ceramium shuttleworthianum, Heterosiphonia plumose, Nitophyllum punctatum, Hypoglossum hypoglossoides, Drachiella spectabilis, Odonthalia dentate, Osmundea pinnatifida, Polysiphonia lanosa, P. stricta, Enteromorpha intestinalis, Ulva lactuca, Fucus serratus, F. spiralis and Ascophyllum nodosum have been recorded.

=== Important Bird Area ===
The island has been designated an Important Bird Area (IBA) by BirdLife International because it supports breeding populations of several species of seabirds as well as being a winter feeding ground for barnacle geese.

== Population and history ==
The island is now uninhabited but had a resident community until 1929 and lighthouse keepers until 1987. The evacuation of the community from Inistrahull took place en bloc in 1929. The matter was raised in a Dáil debate on illegal fishing in November 1929 by the TD for the area, Deputy Frank Carney. The Deputy stated that Inishtrahull was one of the few places in the country where the population had actually increased by almost 100% from 1881 to 1901. He said that the people on the island had a school and a graveyard and earned their livelihood from the fishing industry with very small boats for inshore fishing and that they could line fish and fish with nets during the herring season. Deputy Carney said that, ordinarily, they were able to make a reasonable living. However, he said that because of illegal fishing by "Scotch and English trawlers and French fishing smacks" the islanders had been compelled some weeks earlier to evacuate the island, desert their homes and leave only a lighthouse keeper behind.

Responding, the Minister for Fisheries, Fionán Lynch TD said that he did not agree that the people had left the island because of illegal fishing and was making enquiries as to their current circumstances. The Minister said that he "would like to feel that everything was being done to keep them from being a permanent charge on home assistance." The Minister later sent a Principal Officer from his department to report on their circumstances. The Minister then reported in the Dáil that "four of the [six Inistrahull] families derived their livelihood from the Irish Lights boat service to the island, in which they are still able to engage" and that there was no case for state intervention. He also said that his Officer's report indicated that the resettled Islanders were not in "poor circumstances."

Historical population

Year	Pop.	±%
1841	54	—
1851	68	+25.9%
1861	55	−19.1%
1871	53	−3.6%
1881	49	−7.5%
1891	53	+8.2%
1901	65	+22.6%
1911	80	+23.1%
1926	39	−51.2%

Year	Pop.	±%
1936	4	−89.7%
1946	4	+0.0%
1951	4	+0.0%
1956	4	+0.0%
1961	5	+25.0%
1966	3	−40.0%
1971	3	+0.0%
1979	3	+0.0%
1981	3	+0.0%

Year	Pop.	±%
1986	6	+100.0%
1991	0	−100.0%
1996	0	0.00%
2002	0	0.00%
2006	0	0.00%
2011	0	0.00%
2016	0	0.00%

Source: Central Statistics Office. "CNA17: Population by Off Shore Island, Sex and Year". CSO.ie.

== Lighthouse ==
Inishtrahull is home to the most northerly Irish lighthouse run by the Commissioners of Irish Lights. The lighthouse was first put into operation in 1813 largely because ships of the Royal Navy had begun to use Lough Foyle. Today its light flashes every 30 seconds. The ruins of the old lighthouse as well as a new (1956) lighthouse can be found on the island. Automation of the lighthouse was completed in March 1987 and the last three Lighthousekeepers left the station on 30 April 1987.

== Attractions ==
Inishtrahull is well known for its wildlife and is designated a Special Area of Conservation and a Special Protection Area by the National Parks and Wildlife Service.

The island's geographical location and lighthouse attract many unusual birds, as well as a population of grey seals. The island and its adjacent 90-metre depth tidal sound attract basking sharks and cetaceans in large numbers during the summer months. Many scuba-divers use the Islands Port Mór as a lunch spot while out surveying the hundreds of wrecks off its shores. Access to the island is limited by the dangerous tides and currents around Malin Head and the island itself. There are landing restrictions enforced by The Commissioners of Irish Lights (present owners of the Island). Particular care is requested by visitors during the breeding bird period of May–July. As of 2015 there are two Geocaches on the island.

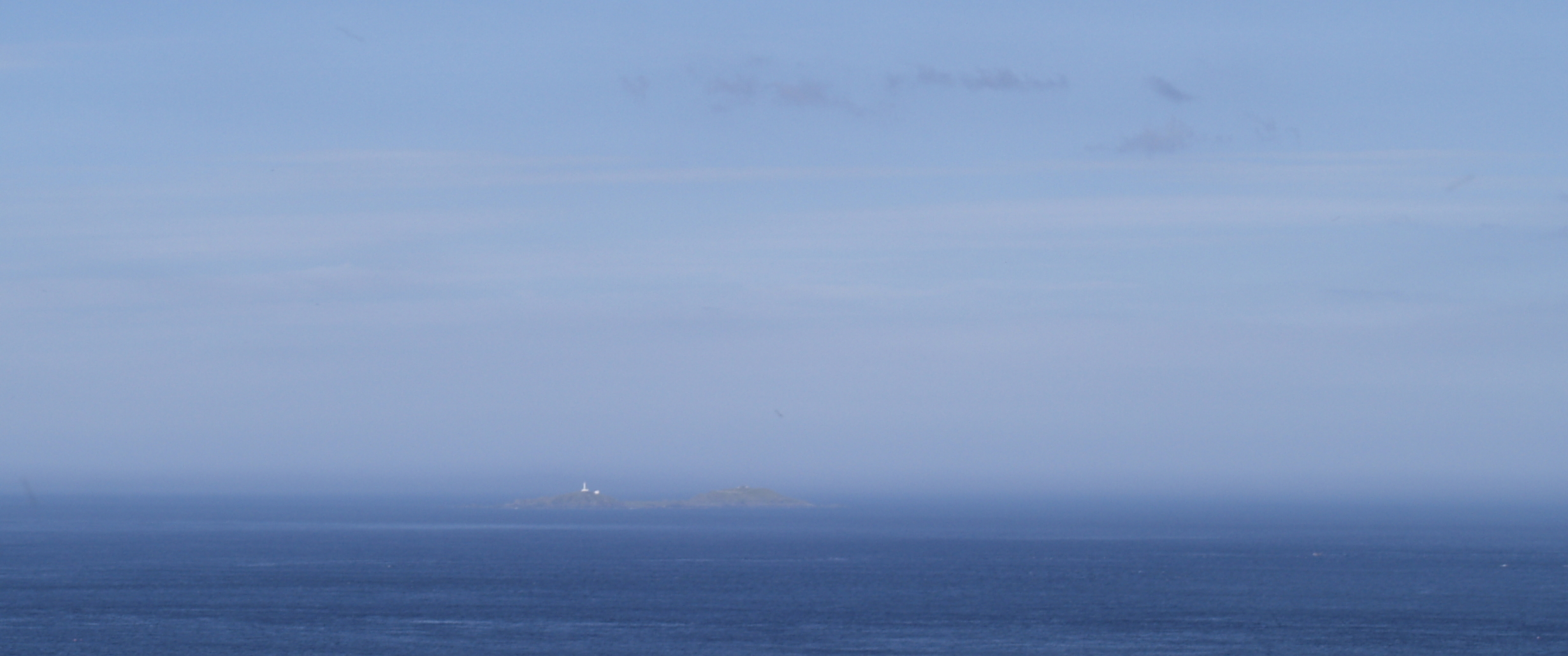
Inishtrahull as seen from Malin Head
