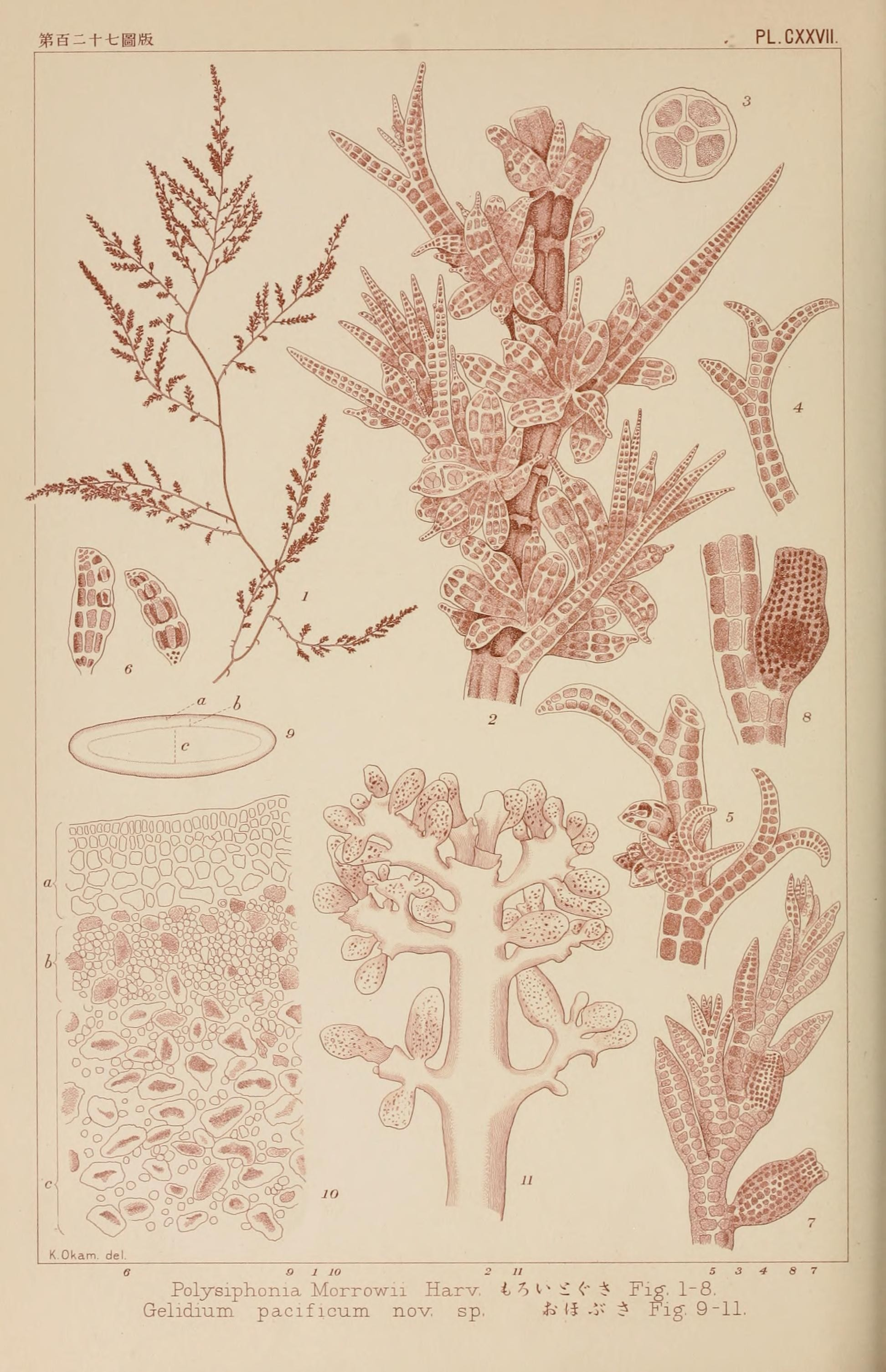
- Polysiphonia morrowii (fig. 1-8)

Scientific classification
- Clade: Archaeplastida
- Division: Rhodophyta
- Class: Florideophyceae
- Order: Ceramiales
- Family: Rhodomelaceae
- Genus: Polysiphonia
- Species: P. morrowii

Binomial name
- Polysiphonia morrowii Harvey, 1857

= Polysiphonia morrowii =

Species of alga

Polysiphonia morrowii is a species of red algae native to Northeast Asia. It has become an invasive species in Europe, Australia, New Zealand, and South America.

It is susceptible to infection by the parasitic oomycete Pythium porphyrae
