= Polysiphonia foetidissima =

Scientific classification
- Clade: Archaeplastida
- Division: Rhodophyta
- Class: Florideophyceae
- Order: Ceramiales
- Family: Rhodomelaceae
- Genus: Polysiphonia
- Species: P. foetidissima

Binomial name
- Polysiphonia foetidissima Cocks ex Bornet

Species of alga

Polysiphonia foetidissima Cocks ex Bornet (also known as Vertebrata foetidissima) is small red marine alga in the Rhodophyta.

== Description ==
Polysiphonia foetidissima grows in dense branching tufts to a length of 11 cm. The fine erect branches have a central axis surrounded by 7 or 8 pericentral cells all of the same length. Rhizoids are produced from the pericentral cells. Trichoblasts are numerous.

== Reproduction ==
Tetrasporangia are formed in the branches.

== Distribution ==
Only recorded twice from Ireland and Great Britain. Further records are from France, Portugal, the Mediterranean and Bermuda.
