= Polysiphonia opaca =

Scientific classification
- Clade: Archaeplastida
- Division: Rhodophyta
- Class: Florideophyceae
- Order: Ceramiales
- Family: Rhodomelaceae
- Genus: Polysiphonia
- Species: P. opaca

Binomial name
- Polysiphonia opaca (C.Agardh) Moris & De Notaris

Species of alga

Polysiphonia opaca (C.Agardh) Moris et De Notaris is a small marine alga in the division Rhodophyta.

== Description ==
This small seaweed consists of tufts of branches no more than 6 cm long. The tufts are of erect branches each consisting a series of axial cells surrounded by about 20 periaxial cells all of the same forming a "collar" around the axis. There is no cortication and the plant is attached by rhizoids which attach the plant to a surface. This alga may be confused with Lophosiphonia reptabunda, this alga has however a turf-like habit and is less than 3 cm high unlike P. opaca which grows to over 5 cm high.

== Distribution ==
Very rare, recorded from the south of Wales. Europe: British Isles to Spain, West Indies and E.Australia.
