= Polysiphonia furcellata =

Scientific classification
- Clade: Archaeplastida
- Division: Rhodophyta
- Class: Florideophyceae
- Order: Ceramiales
- Family: Rhodomelaceae
- Genus: Polysiphonia
- Species: P. furcellata

Binomial name
- Polysiphonia furcellata (C.Agardh) Harvey

Species of alga

Polysiphonia furcellata (C.Agardh) Harvey is small marine red alga in the Division Rhodophyta.

== Description ==
This red alga is a branched algae growing to 10 cm. The erect branches are ecorticate composed of a central axis of cells surrounded by 7 or 8 paraxial cells, all of the same length in a ring around the axial cells. The rhizoids are numerous growing from the pericentral cells. Gametangial and tetrasporangial plants are not known. Reproduction is by specialized propagules

== Distribution ==
England, Wales, Ireland, Isle of Man and Scotland.Canary Islands and in the Mediterranean.
