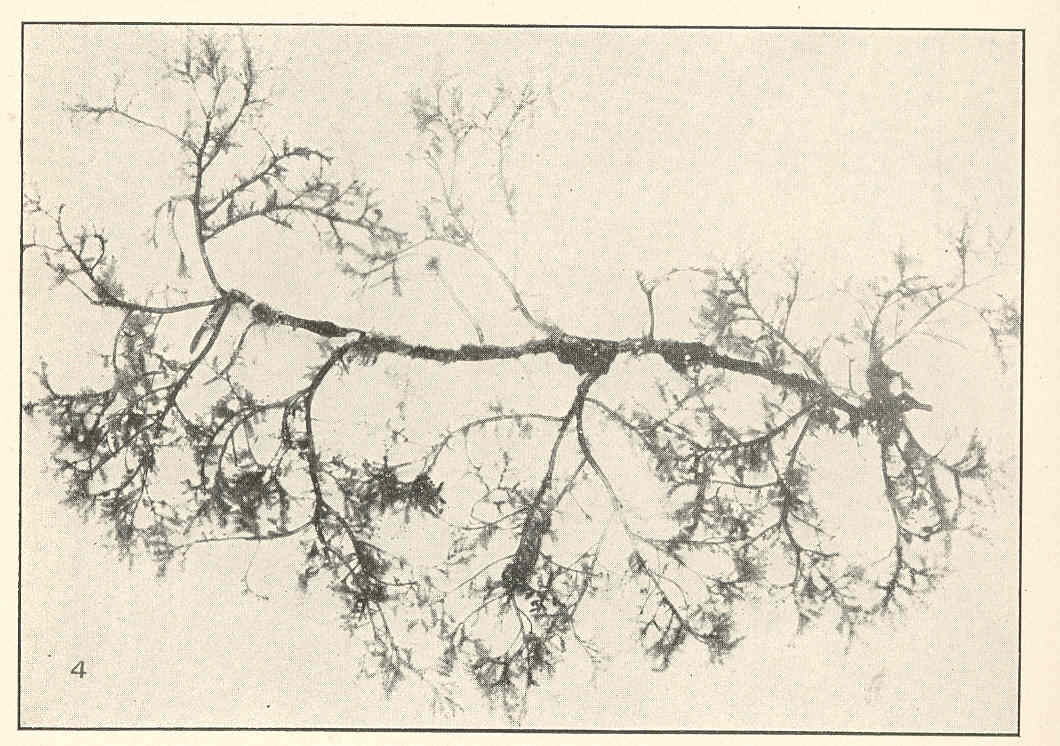

Scientific classification
- Domain: Eukaryota
- Clade: Archaeplastida
- Division: Rhodophyta
- Class: Florideophyceae
- Order: Ceramiales
- Family: Rhodomelaceae
- Genus: Brongniartella; Bory, 1822

Species
- include: Brongniartella australis (C.Agardh) F.Schmitz, 1893; Brongniartella byssoides (Goodenough & Woodward) F.Schmitz, 1893; Brongniartella feredayae Brongniartella mucronata Brongniartella strobilifera

= Brongniartella (alga) =

Genus of algae

Brongniartella is a genus of red algae, named after French naturalist Adolphe Brongniart.

The genus was circumscribed by Jean Baptiste Bory de St. Vincent in Dict. Class. Hist. Nat. (Bory et al.) Vol.2 on page 516 in 1822.
