= Malin Head =

Northernmost part of mainland Ireland

Coordinates: 55°23′N 7°22′W

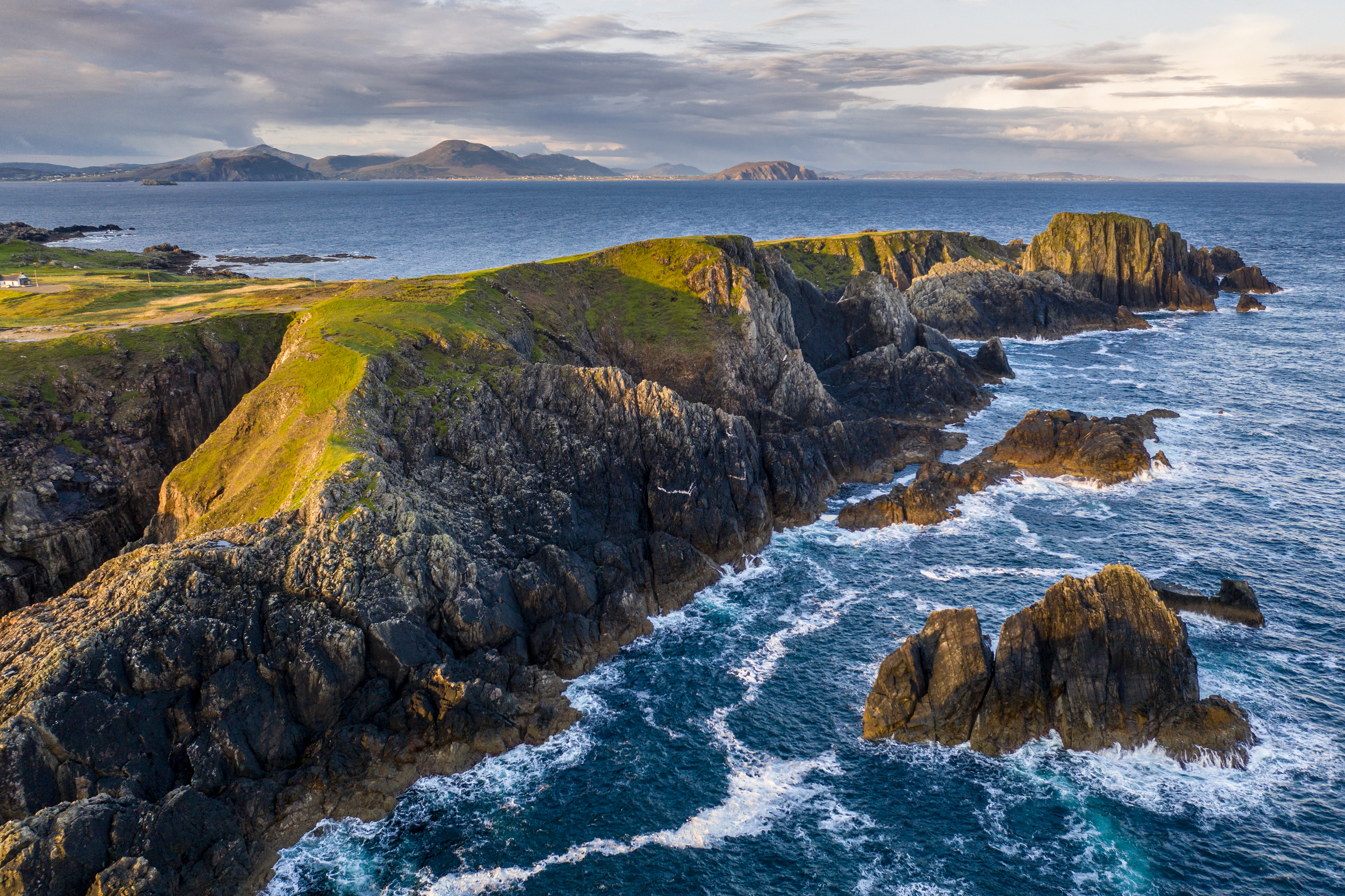
Looking out into the North Atlantic from Malin Head

Malin Head (Irish: Cionn Mhálanna) is the most northerly point of mainland Ireland, located in the townland of Ardmalin on the Inishowen peninsula in County Donegal. The head's northernmost point is called Dunalderagh at latitude 55.38ºN. It is about 16 kilometres (10 mi) north of the village of Malin. The island of Inishtrahull is further north, about 10 km (6 mi) northeast of the headland. Malin Head gives its name to the Malin sea area. There is a weather station on the head, which is one of 22 such stations whose reports are broadcast as part of the BBC Shipping Forecast. A tower built in 1805 is on Altnadarrow, also known locally as the Tower Hill.

Ptolemy's Geography (2nd century AD) described a point called Βορειον (Boreion, "the northern") which probably referred to Malin Head.

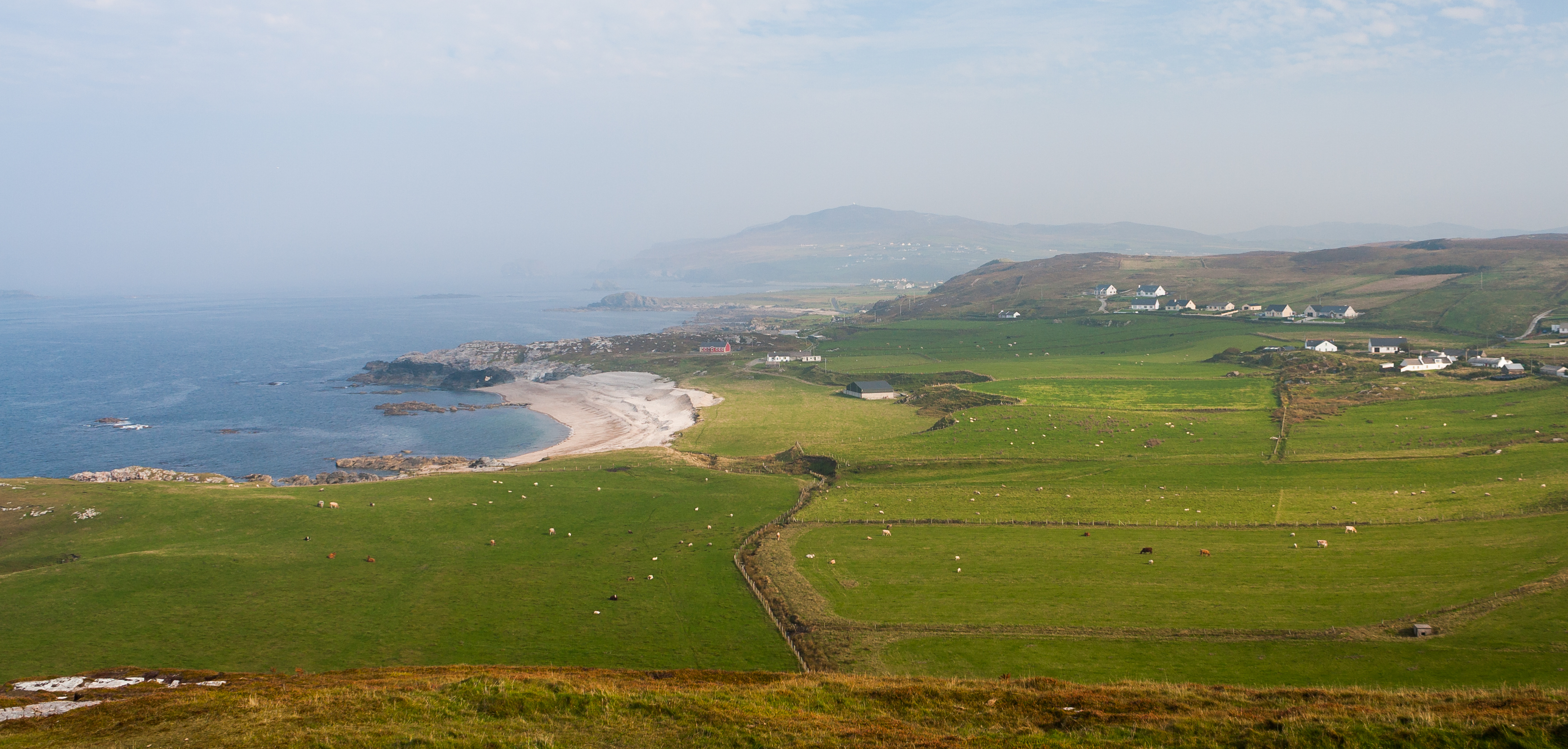
Raised beach of Ballyhillin at Malin Head

== Locality ==
To the northeast Inistrahull Island can be seen. The first lighthouse on the island was put into operation in 1813, and the light flashes every 30 seconds.

Below Altnadarrow to the east lies Ballyhillion beach, a unique raised beach system of international scientific importance. The very distinct shorelines show the changing relationship between the sea and the land from the time the glaciers began to melt, some 15,000 years ago. At that time County Donegal was depressed by the weight of an immense ice sheet, so the level of the sea, relative to today's shore, was up to 80 feet higher than today.

Scenes from Star Wars: The Last Jedi were filmed in Malin Head.

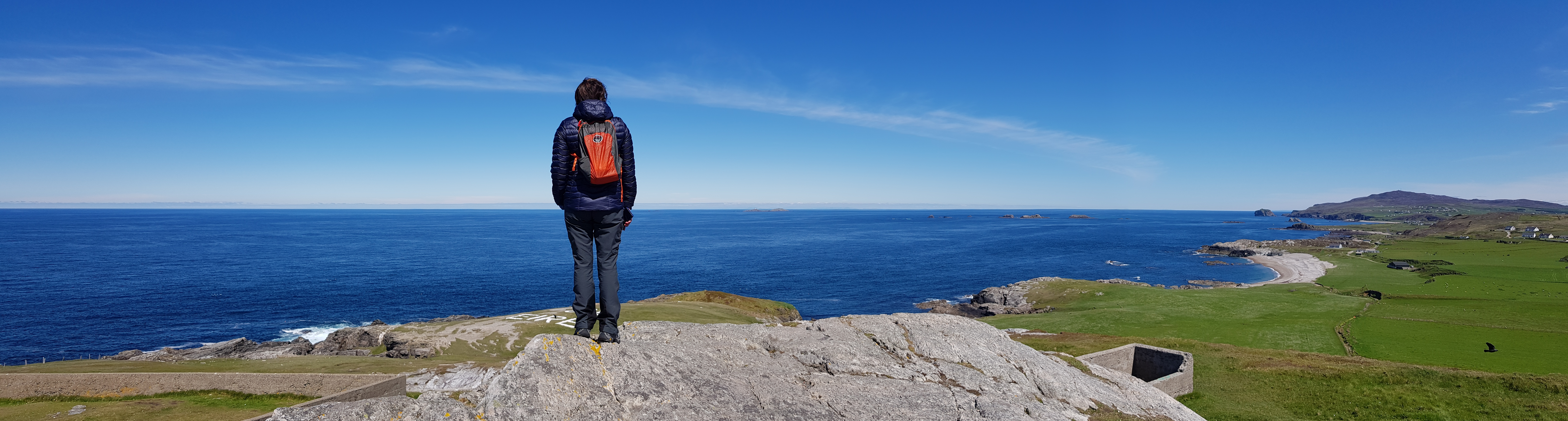
Malin Head panorama looking NE to Tor Beg Rock

== Weather station ==
Weather reports commenced in Malin Head in 1885. In 1955 a new Meteorological station was built beside the coastguard station by Met Éireann. Hourly data points, which include sunshine, wind, rain etc., are recorded here.

=== Climate ===
Malin Head has a temperate oceanic climate (Köppen class Cfb). As a result of its exposed coastal location, high winds and storms are a notable presence for much of the year. Summers are typically mild bordering on cool, while winters have cool days and crisp nights.

Climate data for Malin Head, elevation: 20 m (66 ft) (1991–2020 normals, extremes 1885–present)
Month	Jan	Feb	Mar	Apr	May	Jun	Jul	Aug	Sep	Oct	Nov	Dec	Year
Record high °C (°F)	14.9 (58.8)	15.0 (59.0)	19.9 (67.8)	23.4 (74.1)	25.1 (77.2)	27.2 (81.0)	27.6 (81.7)	27.1 (80.8)	28.9 (84.0)	22.8 (73.0)	17.6 (63.7)	16.8 (62.2)	28.9 (84.0)
Mean daily maximum °C (°F)	8.2 (46.8)	8.4 (47.1)	9.4 (48.9)	11.1 (52.0)	13.3 (55.9)	15.3 (59.5)	17.0 (62.6)	17.1 (62.8)	15.8 (60.4)	13.1 (55.6)	10.5 (50.9)	8.8 (47.8)	12.3 (54.1)
Daily mean °C (°F)	6.0 (42.8)	6.0 (42.8)	7.0 (44.6)	8.6 (47.5)	10.7 (51.3)	12.8 (55.0)	14.5 (58.1)	14.8 (58.6)	13.4 (56.1)	11.0 (51.8)	8.4 (47.1)	6.6 (43.9)	10.0 (50.0)
Mean daily minimum °C (°F)	3.7 (38.7)	3.7 (38.7)	4.6 (40.3)	6.0 (42.8)	8.0 (46.4)	10.4 (50.7)	12.1 (53.8)	12.4 (54.3)	11.1 (52.0)	8.8 (47.8)	6.2 (43.2)	4.3 (39.7)	7.6 (45.7)
Record low °C (°F)	−6.2 (20.8)	−6.7 (19.9)	−5.0 (23.0)	−3.9 (25.0)	−0.6 (30.9)	2.6 (36.7)	5.6 (42.1)	4.8 (40.6)	2.0 (35.6)	0.0 (32.0)	−2.6 (27.3)	−5.5 (22.1)	−6.7 (19.9)
Average precipitation mm (inches)	118.9 (4.68)	95.2 (3.75)	80.7 (3.18)	63.4 (2.50)	65.0 (2.56)	73.8 (2.91)	86.0 (3.39)	97.8 (3.85)	94.8 (3.73)	110.3 (4.34)	121.6 (4.79)	130.5 (5.14)	1,138.1 (44.81)
Average precipitation days (≥ 1.0 mm)	18.8	15.8	15.2	12.6	12.2	12.4	15.7	15.7	14.9	17.5	19.8	19.5	190.1
Average relative humidity (%)	82.3	80.9	80.2	79.5	79.9	82.7	83.9	83.4	82.0	80.9	81.5	81.7	81.6
Average dew point °C (°F)	3.4 (38.1)	3.2 (37.8)	3.9 (39.0)	5.1 (41.2)	7.2 (45.0)	9.8 (49.6)	11.6 (52.9)	11.8 (53.2)	10.4 (50.7)	7.9 (46.2)	5.6 (42.1)	3.9 (39.0)	7.0 (44.6)
Mean monthly sunshine hours	39.6	66.7	104.4	159.1	201.7	165.7	145.1	145.0	113.2	81.5	47.1	34.2	1,303.3
Source 1: Met Éireann
Source 2: NOAA Servizio Meteorologico (extremes)

== Wartime use ==
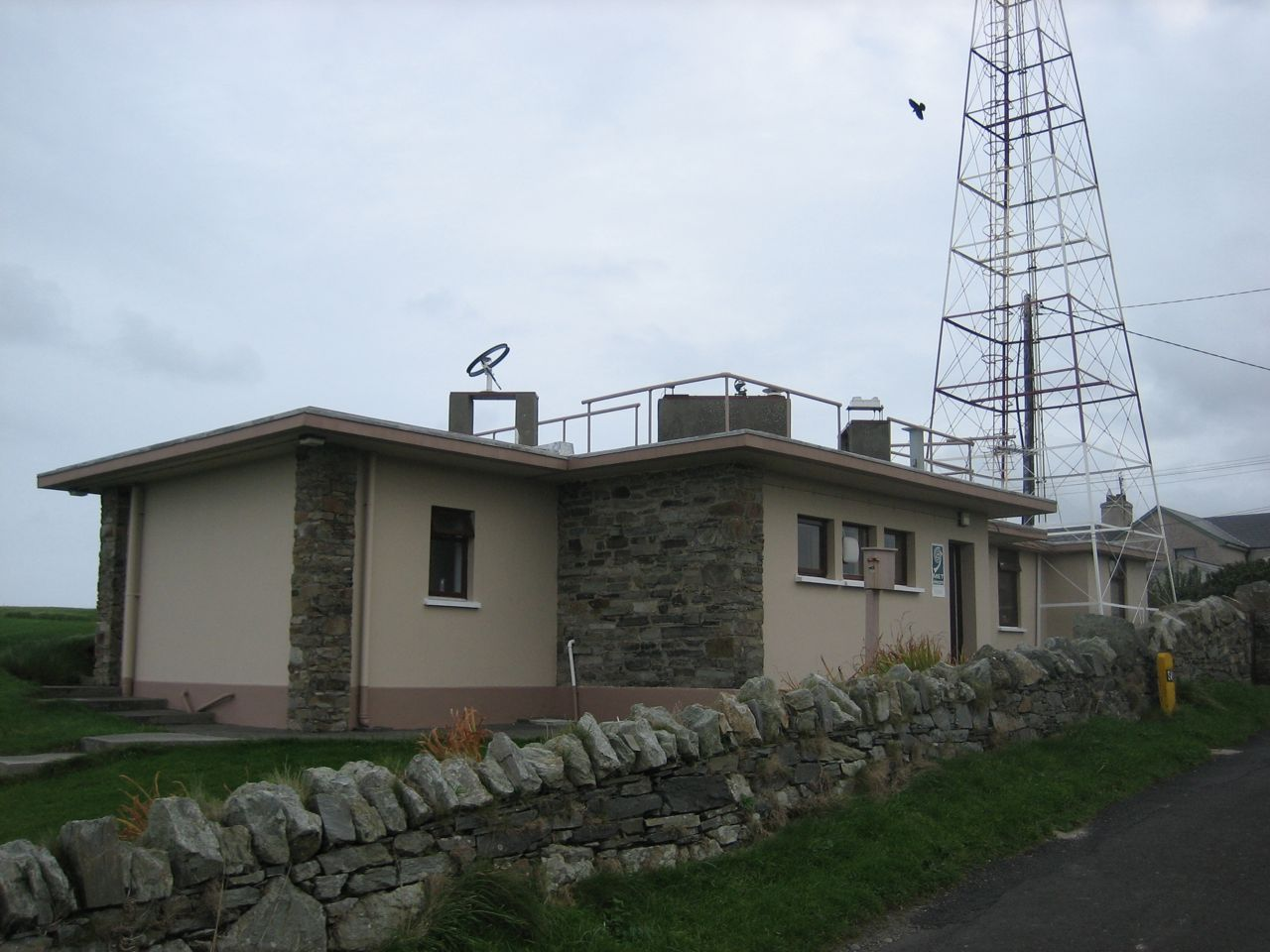
The Met Éireann station at Malin Head

A military watchtower was built on Altnadarrow in 1805, during the Napoleonic Wars. Around 1902, a signal station used by the Marconi Company was built close to the old Napoleonic watchtower. Both of these buildings still stand.

During The Emergency (World War II), the Government of Ireland allowed the British Government to site two radio direction finders on Malin Head. This top-secret operation was mentioned in The Cranborne Report. The RDF equipment was used by Allied naval and air forces to monitor U-boat and aerial activity in the North Atlantic. A detailed history of radio at Malin Head, Marconi Wireless Radio Station: Malin Head from 1902 was published in 2014.

To the north of Altnadarrow and just before Dúnalderagh, a ground marker reading '80 EIRE' can be seen in large letters that were formed from placing stones together to form the letters. This was to signify to overflying planes that they were crossing Irish territory and that Ireland was neutral.

== Wildlife ==
Malin Head is used as a place to watch seabirds such as gannets, shearwaters, skuas, auks and others, during the autumn, on their southward migration flights. Black-browed albatross, feas petrel and other rare seabirds have been recorded here. The site is also used to watch for basking sharks and the resident pod of bottle-nosed dolphins.

== Gallery ==
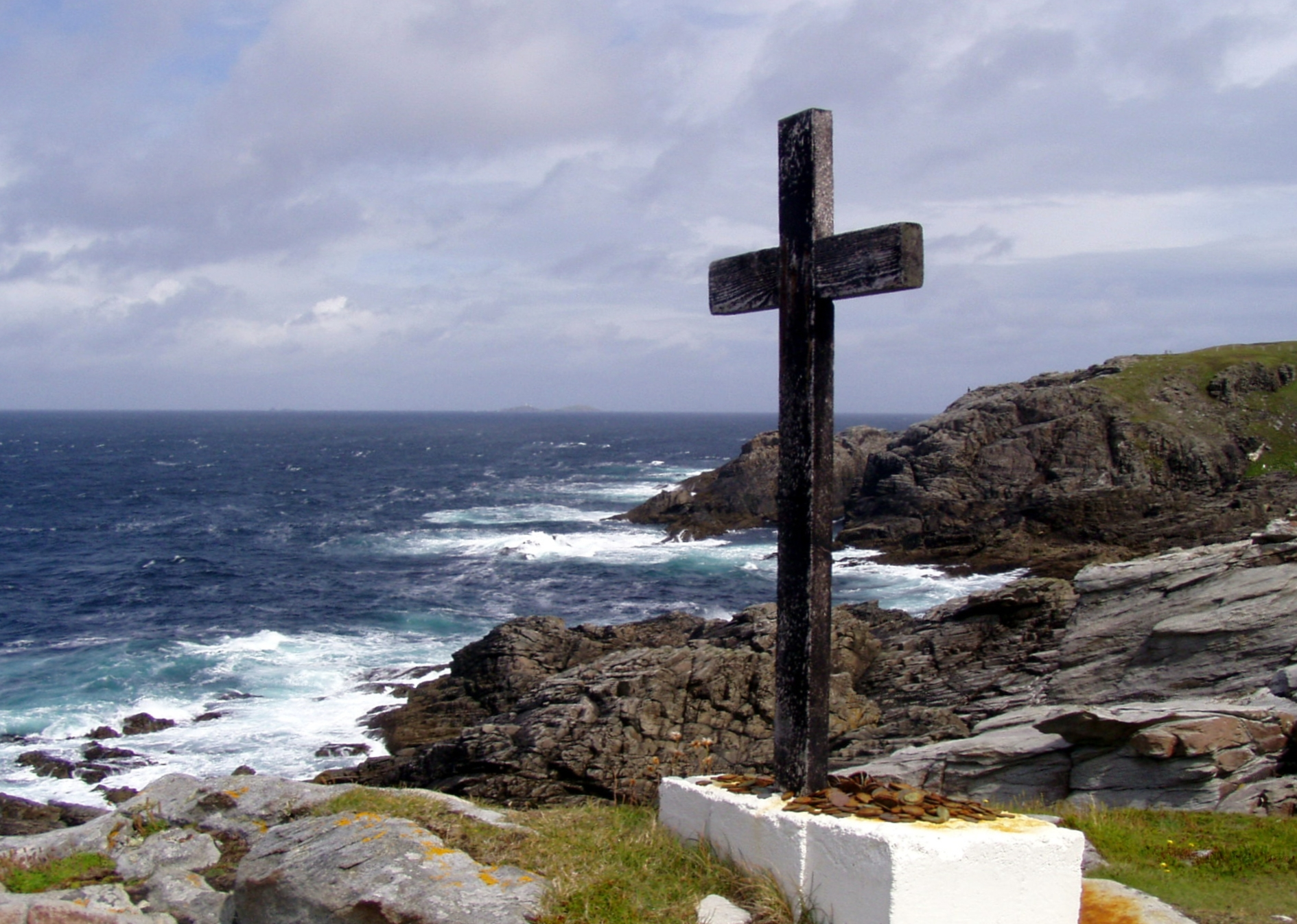
Cross at Malin Head

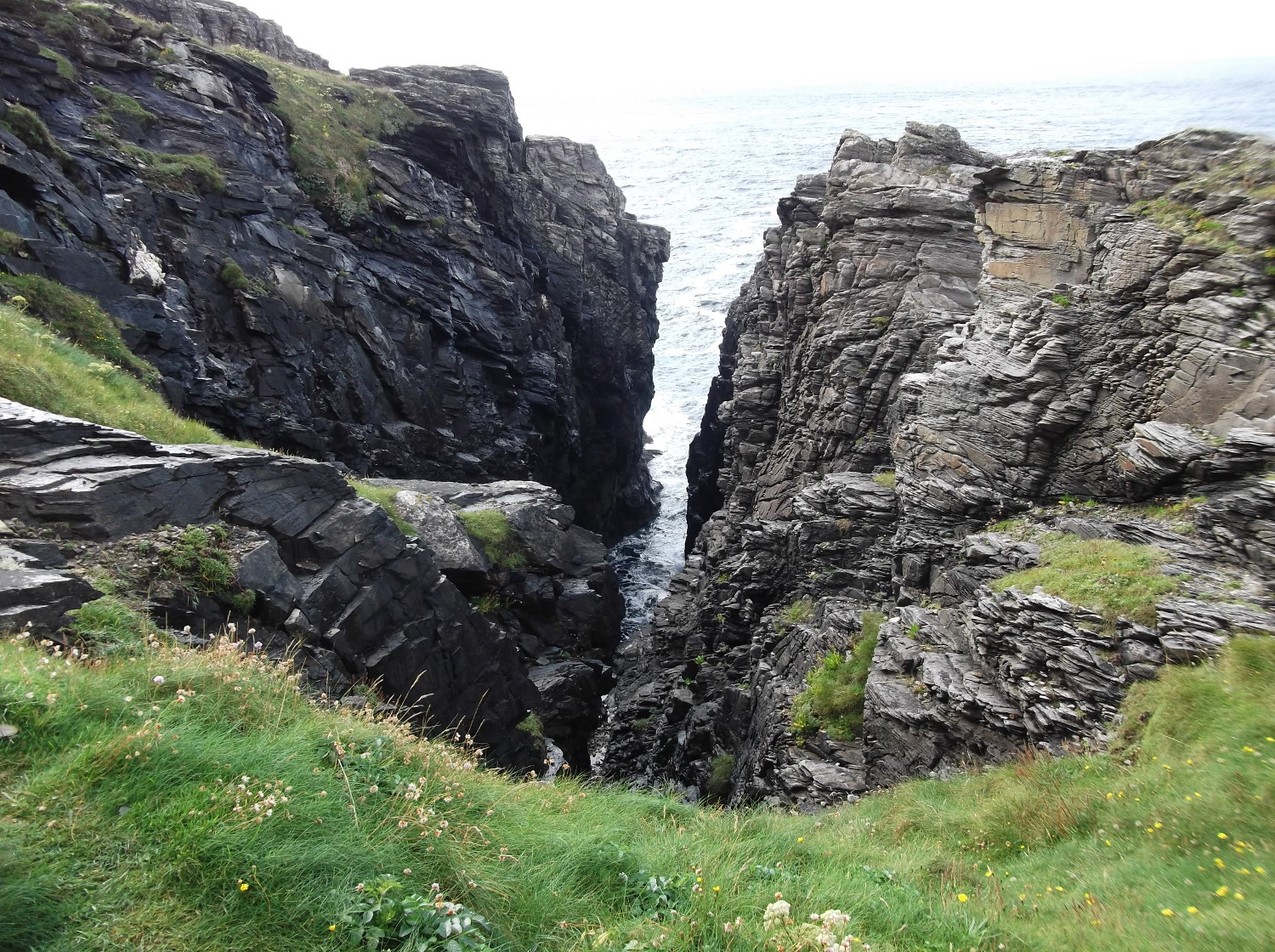
Hell's hole cavern.

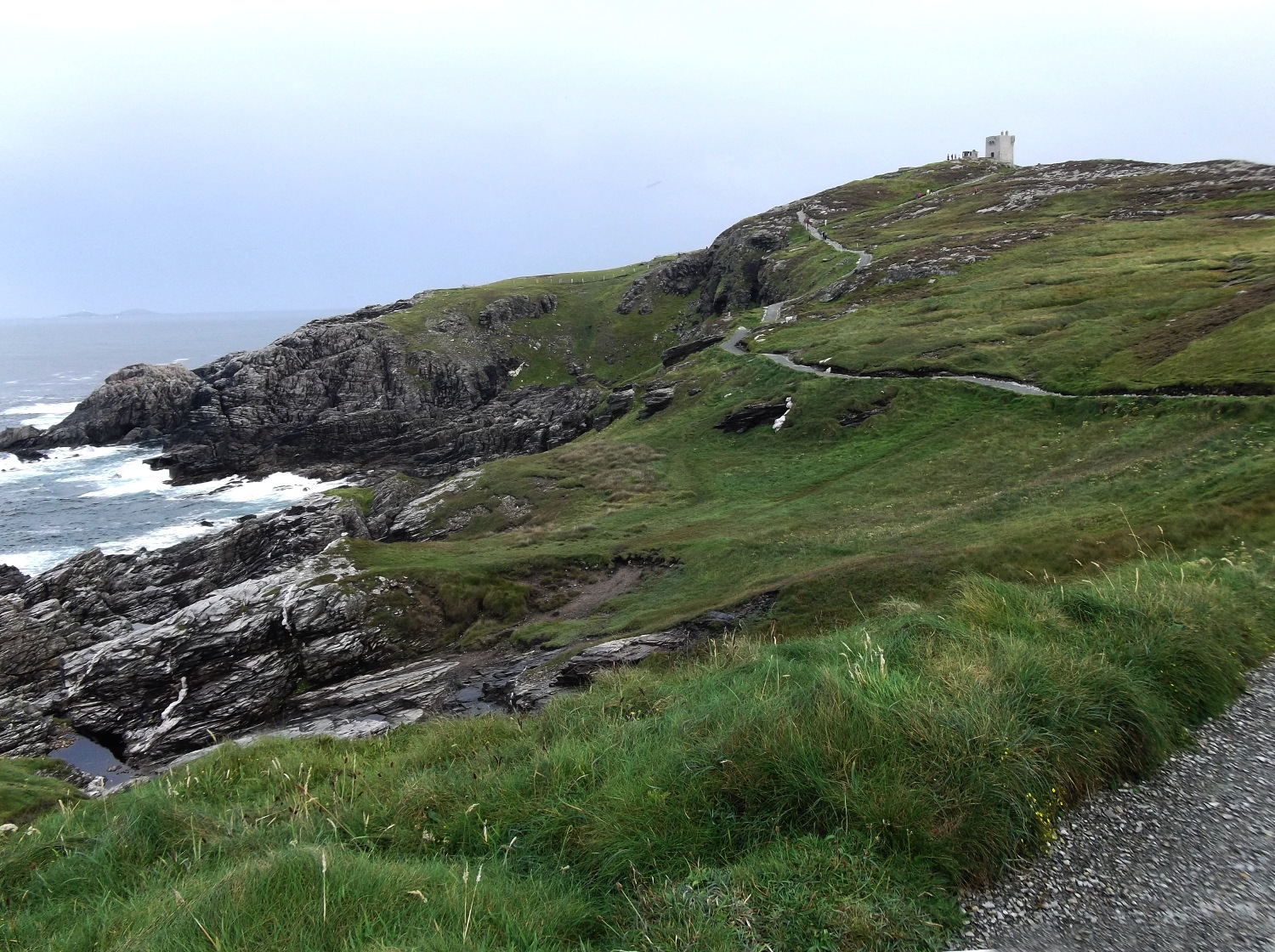
Malin head coastline looking towards the north.

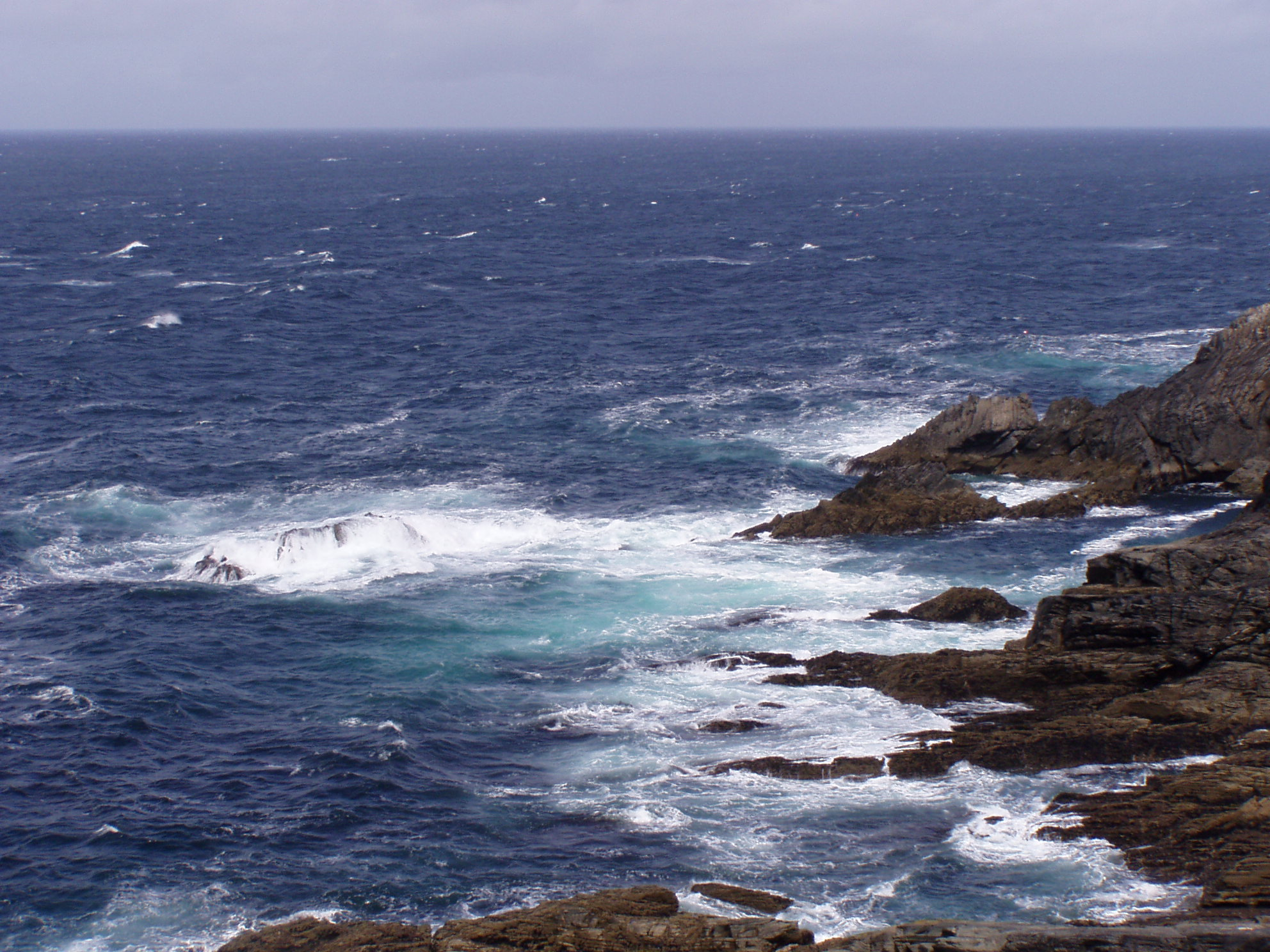
View of the rugged coast around the Head.

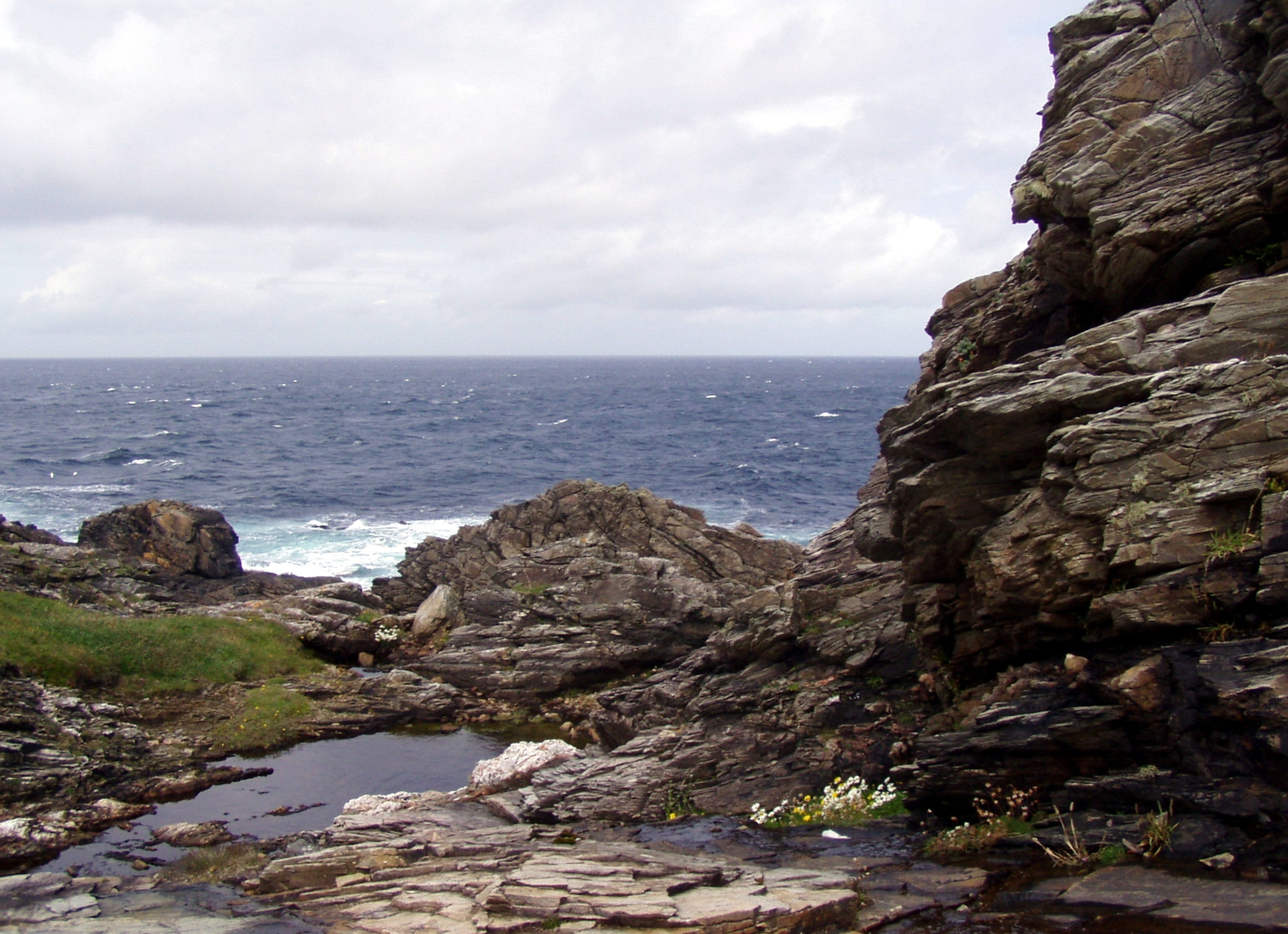
Low tide beneath the cliffs at Malin Head.

== See also ==
- Malin to Mizen
- Wild Atlantic Way
- List of tourist attractions in Ireland
