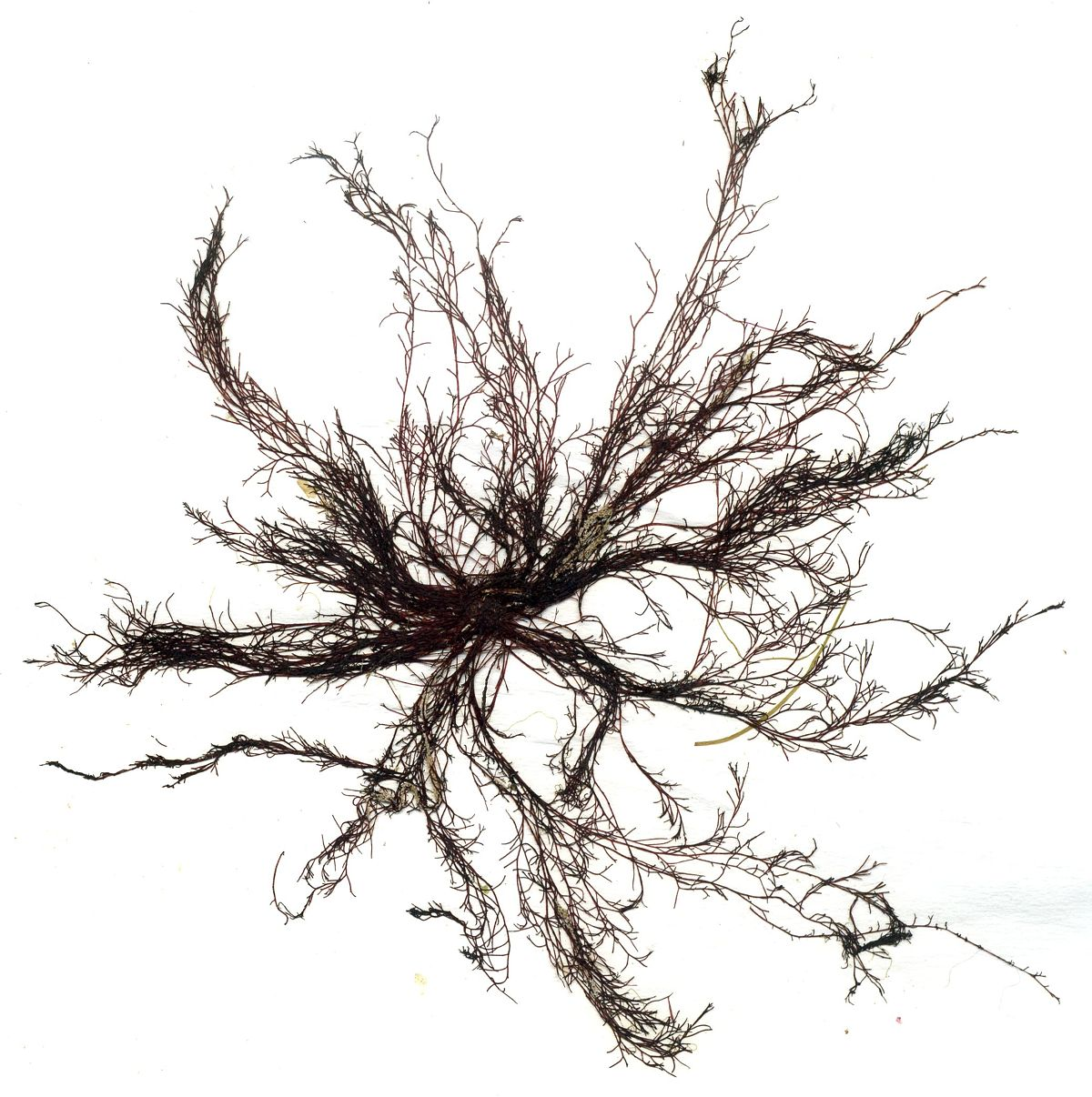
- Polysiphonia urceolata

Scientific classification
- Domain: Eukaryota
- Clade: Archaeplastida
- Division: Rhodophyta
- Class: Florideophyceae
- Order: Ceramiales
- Family: Rhodomelaceae
- Genus: Polysiphonia; Greville, 1823

= Polysiphonia =

Genus of algae

Polysiphonia, known as red hair algae, is a genus of filamentous red algae with about 19 species on the coasts of the British Isles and about 200 species worldwide, including Crete in Greece, Antarctica and Greenland. Its members are known by a number of common names. (Note: Recorded common names are olann dhearg, craonach, cúnach triosgar, cluaisíní, mileara, millreacha, salata tou yialou (σαλάτα του γιαλού) and lobster horns.) It is in the order Ceramiales and family Rhodomelaceae.

== Description ==
Polysiphonia is a red alga, polysiphonous and usually well branched, with some plants reaching a length of about 30 cm. They are attached by rhizoids or haptera to a rocky surface or other alga. The thallus (tissue) consists of fine branched filaments each with a central axial filament supporting pericentral cells. The number of these pericentral cells (4–24) is used in identification. Polysiphonia elongata shows a central axial cell with 4 periaxial cells with cortical cells growing over the outside on the older fronds. Its cuticle contains bromine.

Features used in identification include the number of pericentral cells, the cortication of main branches, constriction of young branches at their base, whether the branching dichotomous or spiral, and the width and length of thalli.

== Distribution and ecology ==
Species have been recorded from Europe, Australia and New Zealand, North America and South America, islands in the Pacific Ocean, South Africa, southwest Asia, Japan, Greenland and Antarctica.

The species are entirely marine, found growing on rock, other algae, mussels or limpets and artificial substrata etc. from mid-littoral to at least 27 m depth. Many species are abundant in rock pools. Polysiphonia lanosa is commonly found growing on Ascophyllum nodosum.

== Reproduction and life cycle ==
The life-cycle of the red algae has three stages (triphasic). In Polysiphonia it consists of a sequence of a gametangial, carposporangial and tetrasporangial phases. Male (haploid) plants (the male gametophytes) produce spermatia and the female plants (the female gametophytes) produce the carpogonium (the haploid carpogonium) which remains attached to the parent female plant. After fertilization the diploid nucleus migrates and fuses with an auxiliary cell. A complex series of fusions and developments follow as the diploid zygote develops to become the carposporophyte, this is a separate phase of the life-cycle and is entirely parasitic on the female, it is surrounded by the haploid pericarp of the parent female plant. The diploid carpospores produced in the carposporangium when released are non-motile, they settle and grow to form filamentous diploid plants similar to the gametophyte. This diploid plant is the tetrasporophyte which when adult produced spores in fours after meiosis. These spores settle and grow to become the male and female plants thus completing the cycle.

== Species ==
The species currently recognized are:

- P. abscissa
- P. abscissoides
- P. acanthina
- P. acuminata
- P. adamsiae
- P. adriatica
- P. amphibolis
- P. anisogona
- P. anomala
- P. arachnoidea
- P. arctica
- P. aterrima
- P. atlantica
- P. atra
- P. atricapilla
- P. australiensis
- P. azorica
- P. bajacali
- P. banyulensis
- P. barbatula
- P. baxteri
- P. beaudettei
- P. beguinotii
- P. bicornis
- P. biformis
- P. bifurcata
- P. binneyi
- P. blandii
- P. boergesenii
- P. boldii
- P. breviarticulata
- P. brevisegmenta
- P. brodiei
- P. caespitosa
- P. callithamnioides
- P. cancellata
- P. capucina
- P. carettia
- P. caspica
- P. castagnei
- P. castelliana
- P. ceramiaeformis
- P. cladorhiza
- P. coacta
- P. codicola
- P. collinsii
- P. confusa
- P. constricta
- P. corymbosa
- P. crassa
- P. crassicollis
- P. crassiuscula
- P. curta
- P. dasyoeformis
- P. daveyae
- P. decipiens
- P. decussata
- P. delicatula
- P. denudata
- P. derbesii
- P. deusta
- P. devoniensis
- P. dichotoma
- P. dotyi
- P. dumosa
- P. echigoensis
- P. echinata
- P. elongata - lobster horns
- P. elongella
- P. erythraea
- P. exilis
- P. fernandeziana
- P. fibrata
- P. fibrillosa
- P. figariana
- P. flabelliformis
- P. flabellulata
- P. flexella
- P. flexicaulis
- P. flocculosa
- P. foeniculacea
- P. foetidissima
- P. forfex
- P. fracta
- P. fragilis
- P. fucoides
- P. funebris
- P. furcellata
- P. fuscorubens
- P. gonatophora
- P. gracilis
- P. guadalupensis
- P. guernisacii
- P. hancockii
- P. hapalacantha
- P. haplodasyae
- P. hassleri
- P. havanensis
- P. havaniensis
- P. hemisphaerica
- P. hendryi
- P. herpa
- P. hirta
- P. hochstetteriana
- P. hockstetteriana
- P. homoia
- P. howei
- P. implexa
- P. incompta
- P. indigena
- P. infestans
- P. isogona
- P. japonica
- P. johnstonii
- P. kampsaxii
- P. kappannae
- P. kieliana
- P. kotschyana
- P. kowiensis
- P. lanosa
- P. letestui
- P. macounii
- P. marchantae
- P. masonii
- P. mollis
- P. morrowii
- P. mottei
- P. muelleriana
- P. namibiensis
- P. nathanielii
- P. neglecta
- P. nhatrangense
- P. nhatrangensis
- P. nigra
- P. nigrescens
- P. nizamuddinii
- P. opaca
- P. ornata
- P. orthocarpa
- P. pacifica
- P. paniculata
- P. paradoxa
- P. parthasarathyi
- P. parvula
- P. pentamera
- P. perforans
- P. pernacola
- P. perriniae
- P. platycarpa
- P. plectocarpa
- P. plectrocarpa
- P. polychroma
- P. polyspora
- P. porrecta
- P. propagulifera
- P. pseudovillum
- P. pulvinata
- P. quadrata
- P. ramentacea
- P. requienii
- P. rhododactyla
- P. rhunensis
- P. rigidula
- P. rudis
- P. saccorhiza
- P. sadoensis
- P. sanguinea
- P. scopulorum
- P. senticulosa
- P. sertularioides
- P. setigera
- P. shepherdii
- P. simplex
- P. simulans
- P. sinicola
- P. sonorensis
- P. sparsa
- P. sphaerocarpa
- P. spinosa
- P. stricta
- P. strictissima
- P. stuposa
- P. subtilissima
- P. subulata
- P. subulifera
- P. succulenta
- P. tapinocarpa
- P. teges
- P. tenerrima
- P. tenuistriata
- P. tepida
- P. tokidae
- P. tongatensis
- P. tripinnata
- P. triton
- P. tsudana
- P. tuberosa
- P. tuticorinensis
- P. unguiformis
- P. upolensis
- P. urbana
- P. urbanoides
- P. urceolata
- P. utricularis
- P. virgata
- P. yonakuniensis
