= Inishtrahull Lighthouse =

Lighthouse off north coast of Ireland

Inishtrahull (west) Lighthouse
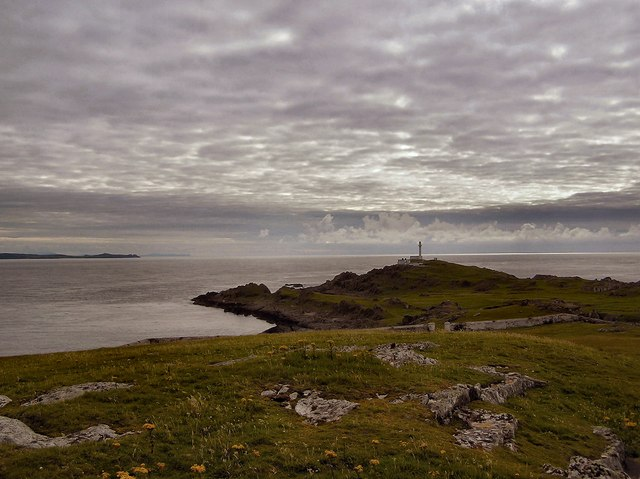
- Distant view of the lighthouse
- Location: Inishtrahull Island
- Coordinates: 55°25′52.5″N 7°14′30.4″W

Tower
- Constructed: 1813 (first)
- Construction: concrete tower
- Automated: 1987
- Height: 23 metres (75 ft)
- Shape: cylindrical tower with balcony and lantern
- Markings: white tower
- Power source: solar power
- Racon: T

Light
- First lit: 1958 (current)
- Focal height: 59 metres (194 ft)
- Lens: Pharos 350mm lens
- Range: 19 nautical miles (35 km; 22 mi)
- Characteristic: Fl (3) W 15s
- Ireland no.: CIL-1480

Inishtrahull Lighthouse is the northerly most lighthouse in Ireland located on the Inishtrahull Island off the coast of County Donegal. Coupled with the lighthouse on Tory Island they form the two main landfall lights for shipping from the Atlantic rounding the north coast of Ireland, and navigation to local shipping. Work on the first lighthouse, situated at the east end of the island began in 1812, primarily due to Royal Navy ships using Lough Foyle.

Designs for the lighthouse were drawn up by a George Halpin, a Senior Inspector of Lighthouses. Acting on behalf of the Corporation for Preserving and Improving the Port of Dublin.

The first Light was established on 17 March 1813. The height of the tower was approx. 12.8 metres. Later a dioptric apparatus was installed in the tower and came into operation on 29 September 1864.

At the start of the 20th century, it was decided that a fog signal was required in the area of Malin Head. It was decided that it would be constructed at the west end of the island and came into operation in 1905. There were, therefore, two separate establishments on the island. In 1952 the Commissioners of Irish Lights decided to update the fog signal the lighthouse. It was decided that the best way to do so would be to build a new lighthouse beside the fog signal station at the west end of the island and to discontinue the lighthouse at the east end.

The existing lighthouse was completed and began service on 8 October 1958. It is 23 metres tall to the balcony and has a Lantern of 19 feet tall.

In 1987, the 1958 optic had to be replaced to comply with the recommendations of the International Association of Lighthouse Authorities for automation. Optic replacement and automation were completed in March of that year. The station was then converted to solar power on 20 September 2000.

The station became unmanned at 1200 hours on 30 April 1987. The fog signal was discontinued the following day.

== See also ==
- Lighthouses in Ireland
