= Tetraspore =

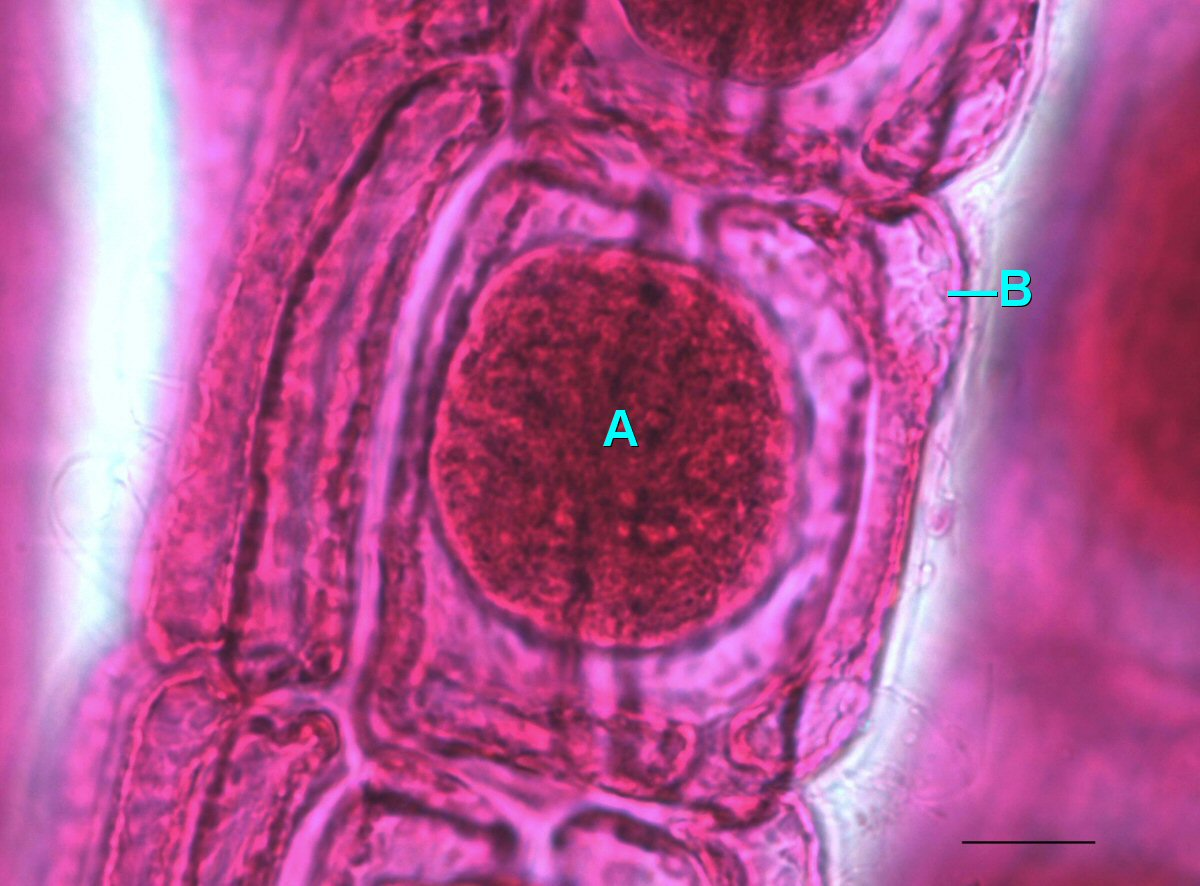
Light microscopy of Polysiphonia showing a tetraspore within a tetrasporophyte cell. A=Tetraspore, B=Tetrasporophyte cell.Scale bar = 0.02 mm

Tetraspores are red algae spores produced by the tetrasporophytic (diploid) phase in the life history of algae in the Rhodophyta as a result of meiosis. The name is derived from the 4 spores that form after this meiosis, the division is of three kinds: cruciate, zonate and tetrahedral.
