= Polysiphonous =

Polysiphonous describes an algal branch with axial cells each surrounded by cells of the same length as the axial cells.

== See also ==
- Monosiphonous algae
