= Cystocarp =

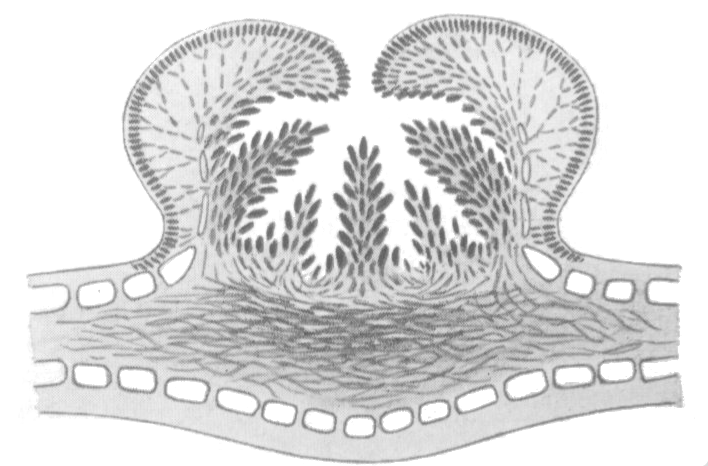
Cystocarp of Amphiplexia hymenocladioides

A cystocarp is the fruiting structure produced in the red algae after fertilization, especially such a structure having a special protective envelope (as in Polysiphonia). The structure from which carpospores are released.
