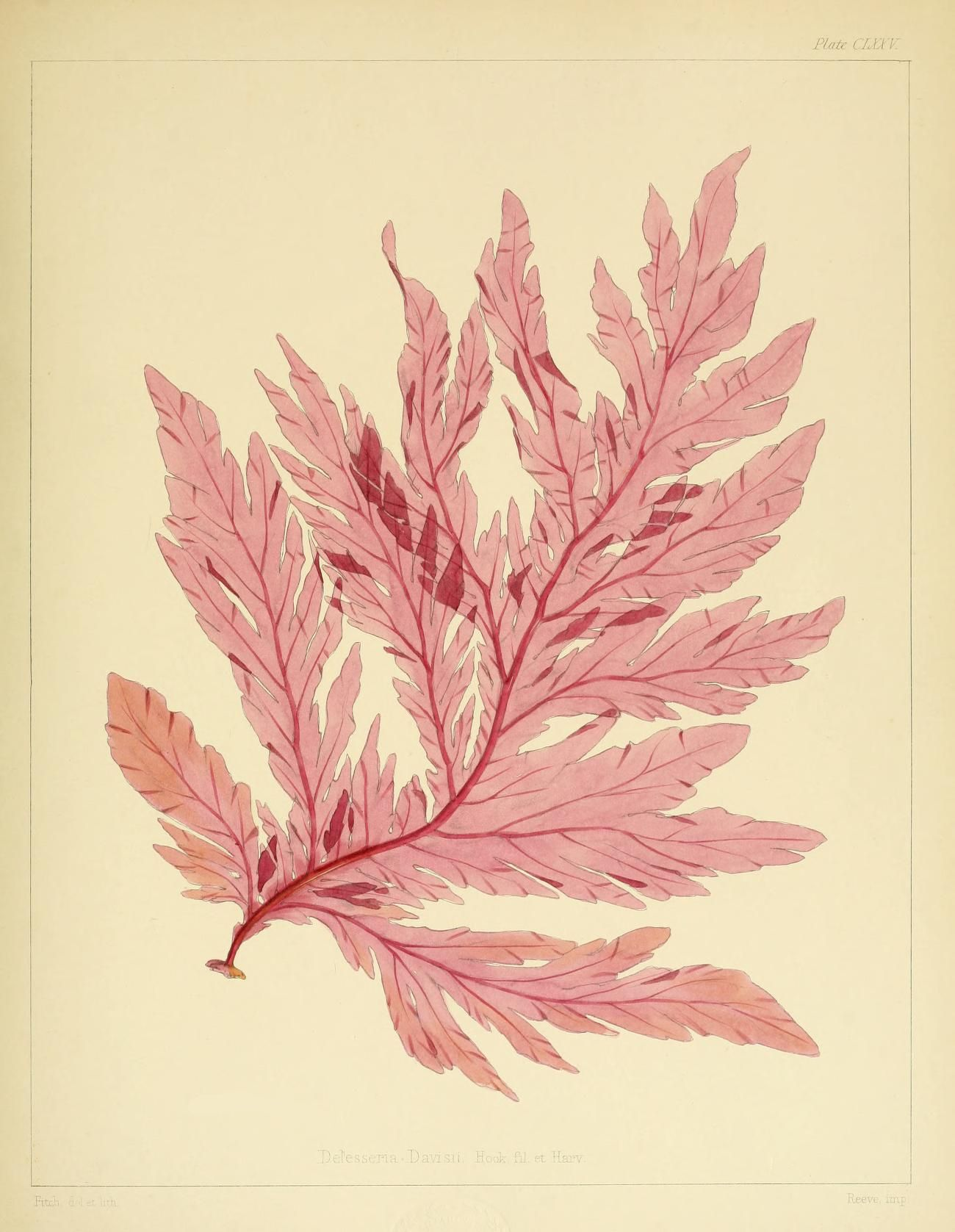

Scientific classification
- (unranked): Archaeplastida
- Division: Rhodophyta
- Class: Florideophyceae
- Order: Ceramiales
- Family: Delesseriaceae
- Subfamily: Phycodryoideae
- Tribe: Schizoserideae M.H. Hommersand & S. Fredericq

Genera
- Drachiella; Abroteia; Neuroglossum; Schizoseris

= Schizoserideae =

Tribe of algae

The Schizoserideae are a tribe of algae in the family Delesseriaceae.
