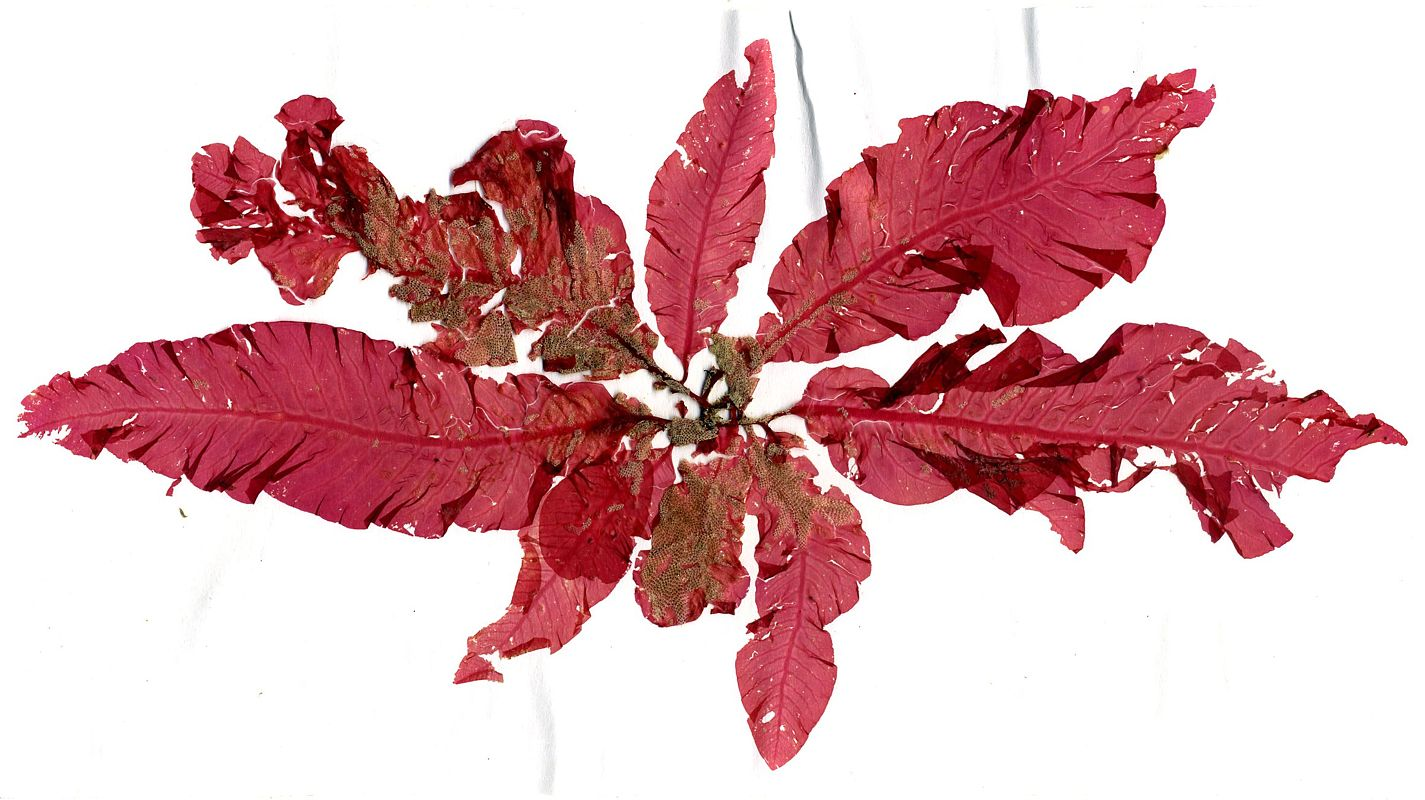

Scientific classification
- Domain: Eukaryota
- Clade: Archaeplastida
- Division: Rhodophyta
- Class: Florideophyceae
- Order: Ceramiales
- Family: Delesseriaceae
- Genus: Delesseria
- Species: D. sanguinea

Binomial name
- Delesseria sanguinea (Hudson) J.V.Lamouroux

= Delesseria sanguinea =

Species of alga

Delesseria sanguinea is a red marine seaweed.

== Description ==
Delesseria sanguinea is a common and bright red perennial alga with flat leaf-like red blades rising from a discoid holdfast. The blades are monostromatic, that is composed of a layers of single cells, and can grow to 25 cm long. Each blade rises from a cylindrical stipe, the stalk-like part, which branches only at near the base. Each blade may 8 cm wide and show a clear midrib with lateral veins. The tips of the blades are rounded. Other similar algae include: Apoglossum ruscifolium, Hypoglossum hypoglossoides and Membranoptera alata all of which are much smaller. Phycodrys rubens is of comparable size but can be easily distinguished having lobed edges to the blades.

== Reproduction ==
All reproductive bladelets are formed on the midrib. Male reproduction bladelets and reach 6 mm long. Spermatangial sori develop on both sides of the midrib on the blade are form a continuous sorus on the blade, oval in shape. Female bladelets have a narrow lamina and cystocarp forms near the apex on a short stalk. Tetrasporangial bladelets are oval in shape and up to 4 mm in size.

== Habitat ==
Growing on rock in pools at low water and also sublittoral to 30 m deep epiphytic on other large algae.

== Distribution ==
Common around Ireland, Great Britain, Isle of Man, Channel Islands, to the north to Norway and Iceland south in Spain.
