= Aethra =

Aethra or AETHRA may refer to:

- Aethra (Greek mythology), a number of different characters in Greek mythology
- Aethra (crab), a genus of crabs in the family Aethridae
- AETHRA Componentes Automotivos, a Brazilian auto testing company
- Aethra, a fictional moon in the Colony Wars franchise
- 132 Aethra, an M-type main-belt asteroid
- The Aethra Chronicles, A 1994 MS-DOS Computer Role Playing Game, produced by Michael Lawrence
