= Rhodokrambe laingioides =

Scientific classification
- Clade: Archaeplastida
- Division: Rhodophyta
- Class: Florideophyceae
- Order: Ceramiales
- Family: Delesseriaceae
- Genus: Rhodokrambe
- Species: R. laingioides

Binomial name
- Rhodokrambe laingioides Hommersand et al., 2009

Species of alga

Rhodokrambe laingioides is a species of Antarctic marine red alga.
