= Martensia formosana =

Scientific classification
- Clade: Archaeplastida
- Division: Rhodophyta
- Class: Florideophyceae
- Order: Ceramiales
- Family: Delesseriaceae
- Genus: Martensia
- Species: M. formosana

Binomial name
- Martensia formosana Lin, Hommersand & Fredericq, 2004

Species of alga

Martensia formosana is a species of red algae.
