= Martensia flabelliformis =

Scientific classification
- Clade: Archaeplastida
- Division: Rhodophyta
- Class: Florideophyceae
- Order: Ceramiales
- Family: Delesseriaceae
- Genus: Martensia
- Species: M. flabelliformis

Binomial name
- Martensia flabelliformis Harvey ex J.Agardh, 1863

Species of alga

Martensia flabelliformis is a species of red algae.
