= Acrosorium papenfussii =

Conservation status
- Vulnerable (IUCN 3.1)

Scientific classification
- Domain: Eukaryota
- Clade: Archaeplastida
- Division: Rhodophyta
- Class: Florideophyceae
- Order: Ceramiales
- Family: Delesseriaceae
- Genus: Acrosorium
- Species: A. papenfussii

Binomial name
- Acrosorium papenfussii W. R. Taylor

Species of alga

Acrosorium papenfussii is a species of red algae described by W. R. Taylor.
