= Martensia fragilis =

Scientific classification
- Clade: Archaeplastida
- Division: Rhodophyta
- Class: Florideophyceae
- Order: Ceramiales
- Family: Delesseriaceae
- Genus: Martensia
- Species: M. fragilis

Binomial name
- Martensia fragilis Harvey, 1854

Species of alga

Martensia fragilis is a species of red algae.
