= Martensia martensii =

Scientific classification
- Clade: Archaeplastida
- Division: Rhodophyta
- Class: Florideophyceae
- Order: Ceramiales
- Family: Delesseriaceae
- Genus: Martensia
- Species: M. martensii

Binomial name
- Martensia martensii S.-M.Lin, Fredericq & L.M.Liao, 2001

Species of alga

Martensia martensii is a species of red algae.
