= Martensia palmata =

Scientific classification
- Clade: Archaeplastida
- Division: Rhodophyta
- Class: Florideophyceae
- Order: Ceramiales
- Family: Delesseriaceae
- Genus: Martensia
- Species: M. palmata

Binomial name
- Martensia palmata Y.Lee, 2005

Species of alga

Martensia palmata is a species of red algae.
