= Martensia lewisiae =

Scientific classification
- Clade: Archaeplastida
- Division: Rhodophyta
- Class: Florideophyceae
- Order: Ceramiales
- Family: Delesseriaceae
- Genus: Martensia
- Species: M. lewisiae

Binomial name
- Martensia lewisiae Lin, Hommersand & Fredericq, 2004

Species of alga

Martensia lewisiae is a species of red algae.
