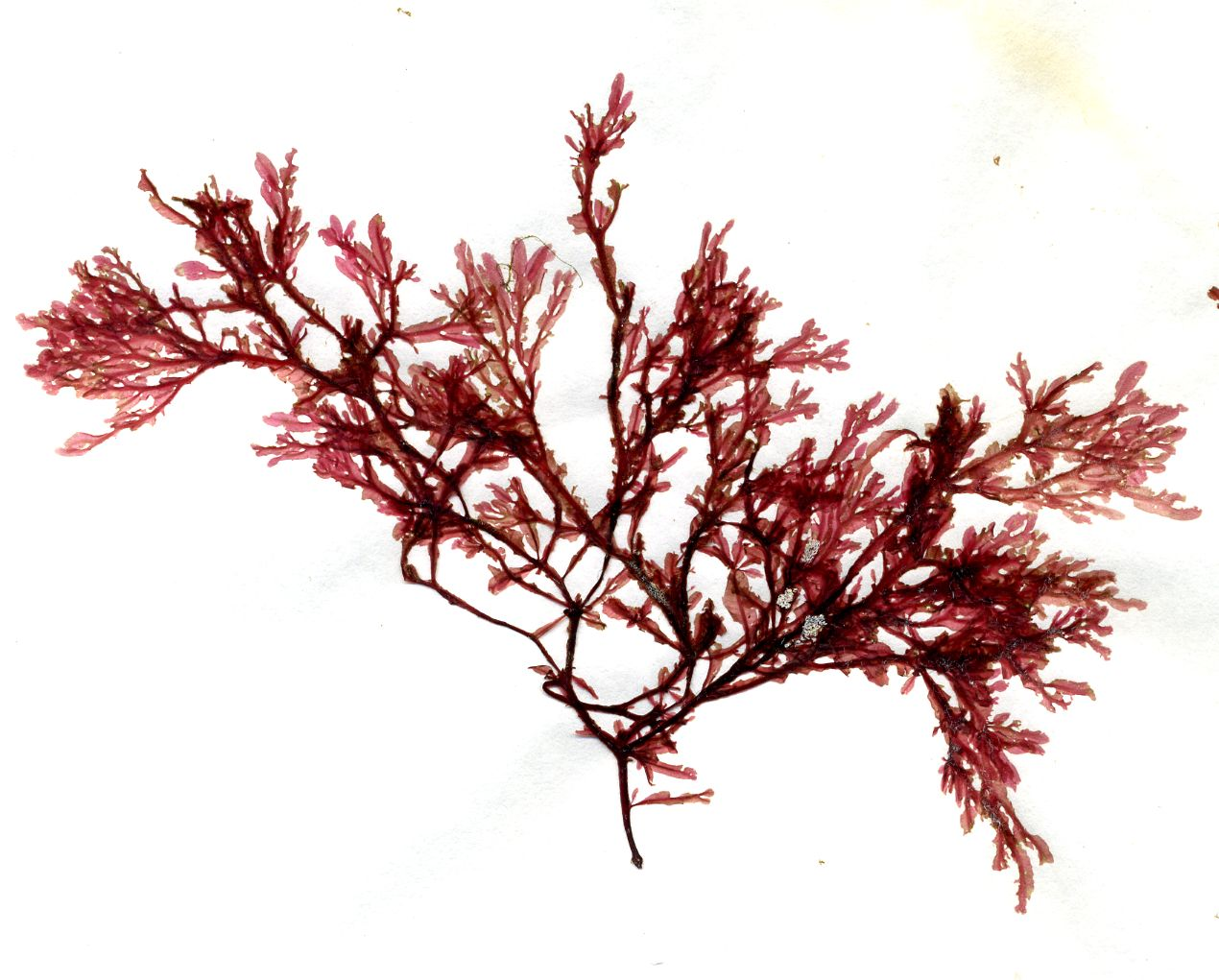
- Membranoptera alata herbarium sheet. Collected in Heligoland, Germany)

Scientific classification
- Clade: Archaeplastida
- Division: Rhodophyta
- Class: Florideophyceae
- Order: Ceramiales
- Family: Delesseriaceae
- Subfamily: Delesserioideae
- Tribe: Delesserieae
- Genus: Membranoptera
- Species: M. alata

Binomial name
- Membranoptera alata (Hudson) Stackhouse, 1809

= Membranoptera alata =

Species of alga

Membranoptera alata is a small red alga in the Rhodophyta.

== Description ==
Membranoptera alata is a small red marine alga growing to a length of no more than 20 cm. Its fronds are up to 2.4 mm wide and monostromatic, that is formed of a thin layer of cells, narrow and branching in one plane. A midrib runs along the center of the branches with fine microscopic veins from the midrib to the margins. The tips of the young branches are asymmetric, incurved and blunt, not pointed.

Two other algae are similar: Apoglossum ruscifolium has blunt tips to the branches while Hypoglossum hypoglossoides has pointed tips, further A. ruscifolium has symmetrical apices unlike those of M. alata which develop more on one side than the other giving "pincer-like" tips.

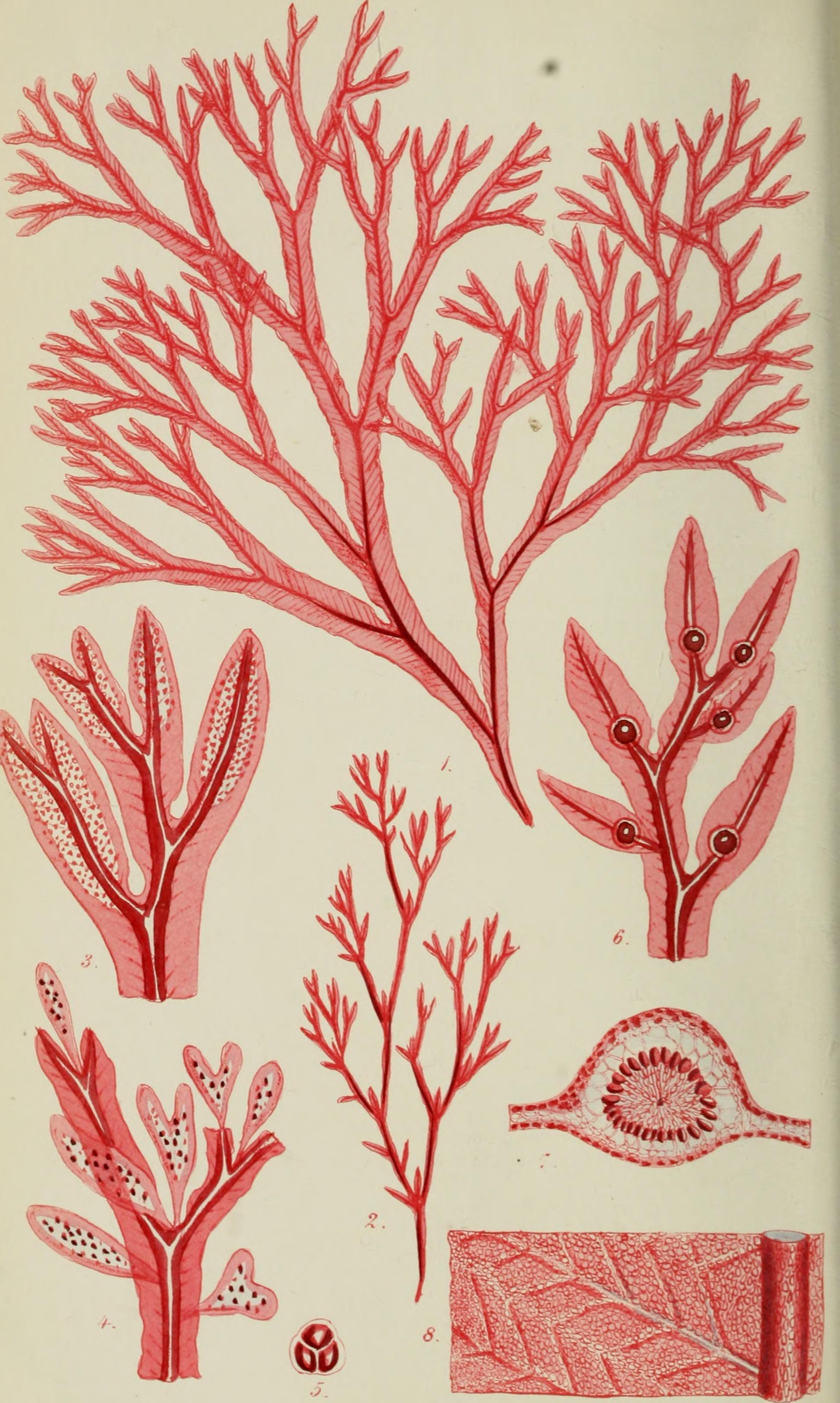
1. A broad variety. 2. Narrow variety: — both the natural size. 3. Apex of branch with tetraspores. 4. Apex with the same, contained in proper leaflets. 5. A tetraspore. G. Apex with tubercles. 7. Section of a tubercle. 8. Portion of the lamina and midrib : — Magnified.

== Reproduction ==
The plants are dioecious. Spermatangial sori, the male gametes, develop in patches near the tips of the branches. The cystocarps develop and become hemispherical growing to 5 mm in diameter on the branches. Tetrasporangia form on the branches in patches up to 1 mm wide.

== Habitat ==
Growing on rock or large algae epiphytically and epilithically in the low littoral and upper sub-littoral.

== Distribution ==
In Ireland this has been recorded from County Donegal. Elsewhere in the North Atlantic on the European coasts it has been recorded from Greenland, Iceland to Spain. On the North American from Canada to Massachusetts.
