= Martensia jejuensis =

Scientific classification
- Domain: Eukaryota
- Clade: Archaeplastida
- Division: Rhodophyta
- Class: Florideophyceae
- Order: Ceramiales
- Family: Delesseriaceae
- Genus: Martensia
- Species: M. jejuensis

Binomial name
- Martensia jejuensis Y.Lee, 2004

Species of alga

Martensia jejuensis is a species of red algae. This red alga was first described by Lee Yongpil (이용필) in 2004.

In South Korea, it is found in the warm waters of the southern coasts off Mokdo, Bijindo, Chujado, and Jeju (whence it derives its epithet, jejuensis). It is also found off southern Japan, Indonesia, and Australia.
