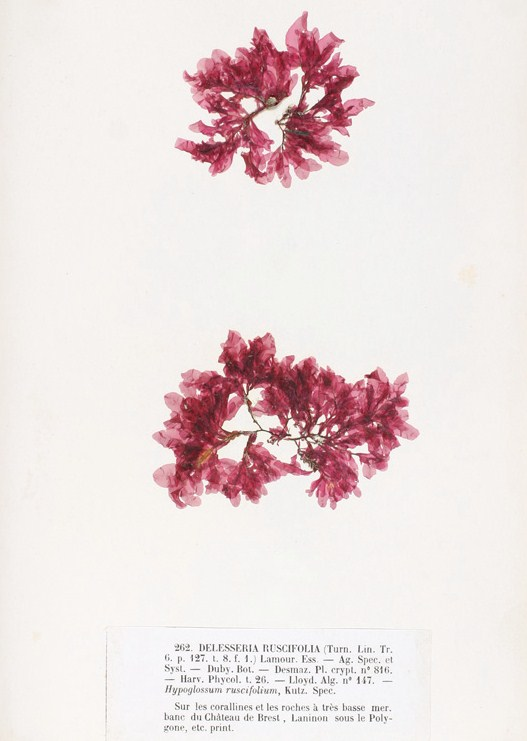

Scientific classification
- Domain: Eukaryota
- Clade: Archaeplastida
- Division: Rhodophyta
- Class: Florideophyceae
- Order: Ceramiales
- Family: Delesseriaceae
- Genus: Apoglossum
- Species: A. ruscifolium

Binomial name
- Apoglossum ruscifolium (Turner) J.Agardh

= Apoglossum ruscifolium =

Species of alga

Apoglossum ruscifolium is a small red marine seaweed.

== Description ==
Apoglossum ruscifolium has branched monostromic blades growing to 10 cm long. The axis branches with primary blades reaching 10 cm long and up to 0.8 cm wide, each with a clear midrib and pointed apices. Lateral veins are microscopic. The species is similar to Membranoptera alata and Hypoglossum hypoglossoides but can be clearly distinguished. The branches of H. hypoglossoides are clearly pointed and the young blades of M.alata are not pointed and are asymmetric with pincer-like tips.

== Reproduction ==
Microscopic sori are formed are microscopic and are formed on either side of the midrib. Female cystocarps occur singly on the frond.

== Distribution ==
Recorded all around Great Britain and Ireland including Shetland, the Isle of Man and the Channel Islands. Norway to the Mediterranean, the South Atlantic and Indian Oceans.
