= Martensia denticulata =

Scientific classification
- Clade: Archaeplastida
- Division: Rhodophyta
- Class: Florideophyceae
- Order: Ceramiales
- Family: Delesseriaceae
- Genus: Martensia
- Species: M. denticulata

Binomial name
- Martensia denticulata Harvey, 1855

Species of alga

Martensia denticulata is a species of red algae.
