= Martensia albida =

Scientific classification
- Clade: Archaeplastida
- Division: Rhodophyta
- Class: Florideophyceae
- Order: Ceramiales
- Family: Delesseriaceae
- Genus: Martensia
- Species: M. albida

Binomial name
- Martensia albida Y.Lee, 2006

Species of alga

Martensia albida is a species of red algae, first described in 2006 by Lee Yong-Pil.

This alga grows on rocks in the subtidal zone at depths of 5 to 8 m. It appears white in the water and is fluorescescent. It is endemic to South Korea and is found on Jeju Island.
