= Acrosorium polyneurum =

Scientific classification
- Clade: Archaeplastida
- Division: Rhodophyta
- Class: Florideophyceae
- Order: Ceramiales
- Family: Delesseriaceae
- Genus: Acrosorium
- Species: A. polyneurum

Binomial name
- Acrosorium polyneurum Okamura

Species of alga

Acrosorium polyneurum is a species of red algae first described by Okamura. It grows in intertidal and shallow subtidal waters in Japan where it is grazed by the sea urchin Hemicentrotus pulcherrimus.
