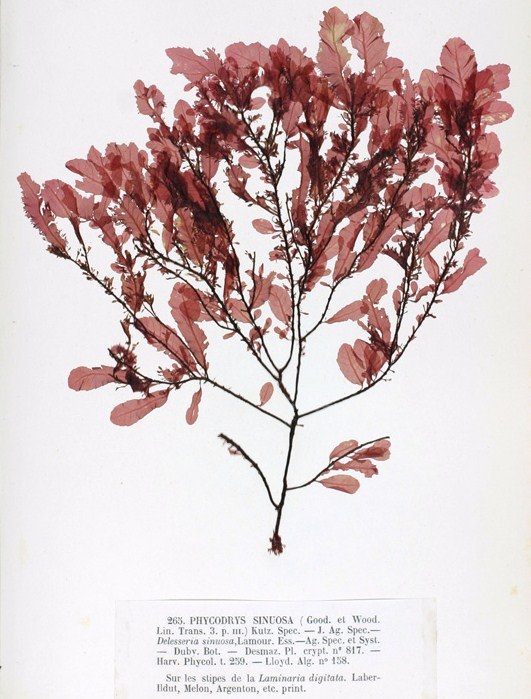
- dried specimen

Scientific classification
- Clade: Archaeplastida
- Division: Rhodophyta
- Class: Florideophyceae
- Order: Ceramiales
- Family: Delesseriaceae
- Genus: Phycodrys
- Species: P. rubens

Binomial name
- Phycodrys rubens (Linnaeus) Batters

= Phycodrys rubens =

Species of alga

Phycodrys rubens is a red marine alga of up to 30 cm long.

== Description ==
Phycodrys rubens is seaweed which is perennial and can grow to 30 cm long and is strongly red in colour. It grows with flat leaf-like blades which are monostromatic, that is composed of a single flat layer of cells and can grow 3 cm wide. These blades can become 3 cm wide and show a clear mid-rib. The blades have a ruffled margin with veins growing out from the central mid-rib with paired lateral veins. The plants grow from a small disk holdfast with an axis to the blades. The algae are somewhat similar to Delesseria sanguinea which is also strongly red but has a smooth, not dentate, margin. The shape of the frond is similar to the leaf of an oak tree.

== Reproduction ==
The gametophytes are dioecious, that is the male and female phases are on separate plants. The reproductive structures are found at the margins of the blades, the cystocarps as branches attached to the veins and the tetrasporangial sori occur near the apices of the larger bladelets.

== Habitat ==
Commonly found in the littoral, sub-littoral in low rock pools and attached to the stipes of large algae such a Laminaria. Found to a depth 30 m.

== Distribution ==
Common on the shores of Ireland, Wales, Isle of Man, Scotland including the Shetland Islands and the north-east and south-east of England. It is not found in the south-east of England. The species is found in the North Atlantic from Spitzbergen to Portugal and Canada.

== Note ==
The fronds adhere well to paper and can be dried to make fine specimens.
