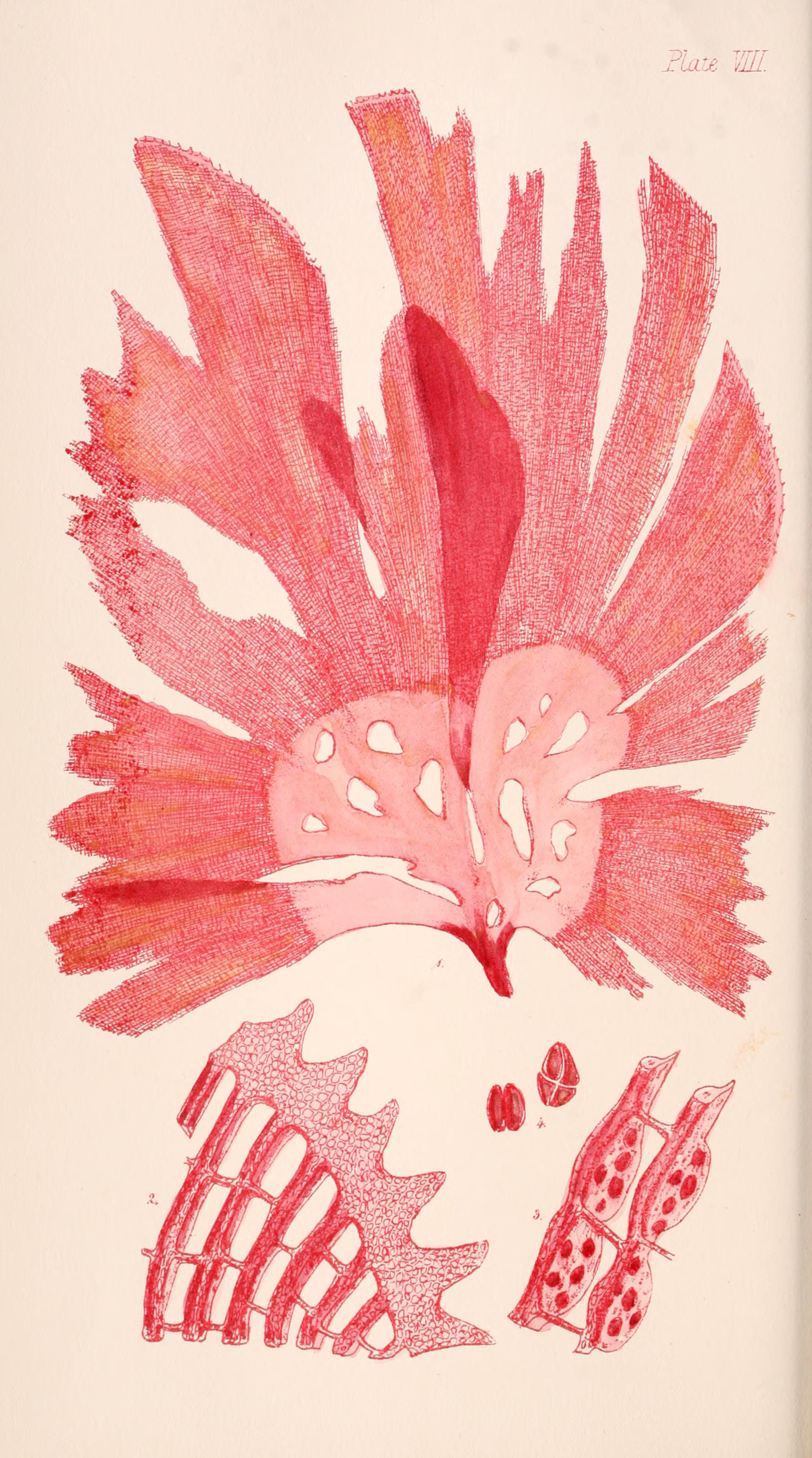
- Martensia australis Harvey

Scientific classification
- Clade: Archaeplastida
- Division: Rhodophyta
- Class: Florideophyceae
- Order: Ceramiales
- Family: Delesseriaceae
- Genus: Martensia
- Species: M. australis

Binomial name
- Martensia australis Harvey, 1855

= Martensia australis =

Species of alga

Martensia australis is a species of red algae.
