= Drachiella =

Drachiella may refer to either

- Drachiella (alga), a genus of red algae
- Drachiella (crab), a genus of crabs
