= Martensia natalensis =

Scientific classification
- Clade: Archaeplastida
- Division: Rhodophyta
- Class: Florideophyceae
- Order: Ceramiales
- Family: Delesseriaceae
- Genus: Martensia
- Species: M. natalensis

Binomial name
- Martensia natalensis S.-M.Lin, Hommersand, Fredericq & De Clerck, 2009

Species of alga

Martensia natalensis is a species of red algae.
