= Martensia elegans =

Scientific classification
- Clade: Archaeplastida
- Division: Rhodophyta
- Class: Florideophyceae
- Order: Ceramiales
- Family: Delesseriaceae
- Genus: Martensia
- Species: M. elegans

Binomial name
- Martensia elegans K.Hering, 1841

Synonyms
- Capraella elegans (Harvey) J.De Toni 1936; Mesotrema elegans (Hering) Papenfuss 1942

Species of alga

Martensia elegans is a red alga species in the genus Martensia. It is a common South African south coast species, extending into KwaZulu-Natal at least as far as Sodwana Bay.
