= Martensia flammifolia =

Scientific classification
- Clade: Archaeplastida
- Division: Rhodophyta
- Class: Florideophyceae
- Order: Ceramiales
- Family: Delesseriaceae
- Genus: Martensia
- Species: M. flammifolia

Binomial name
- Martensia flammifolia Y.Lee, 2006

Species of alga

Martensia flammifolia (민비단망사) is a species of red algae, first described in 2006 by Y.Lee.

This alga has been found on concrete at depths of 12 to 15 m. It is endemic to South Korea and is found on the coast of Jeju Island.
