= Martensia indica =

Scientific classification
- Clade: Archaeplastida
- Division: Rhodophyta
- Class: Florideophyceae
- Order: Ceramiales
- Family: Delesseriaceae
- Genus: Martensia
- Species: M. indica

Binomial name
- Martensia indica V.Krishnamurthy & Thomas, 1977

Species of alga

Martensia indica is a species of red algae.
