= Martensia bibarii =

Scientific classification
- Domain: Eukaryota
- Clade: Archaeplastida
- Division: Rhodophyta
- Class: Florideophyceae
- Order: Ceramiales
- Family: Delesseriaceae
- Genus: Martensia
- Species: M. bibarii

Binomial name
- Martensia bibarii Y.Lee, 2004

Species of alga

Martensia bibarii is a species of red algae.

It belongs to the family Delesseriaceae and the order Ceramiales. The genus Martensia is characterized by its unique thallus morphology, wherein a proximal membranous blade is interrupted distally by one to several bands of net-like tissue (networks).
