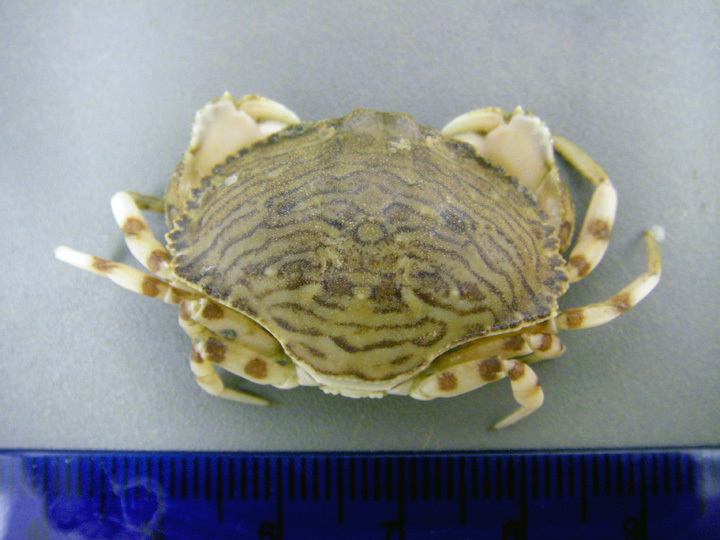

Scientific classification
- Kingdom: Animalia
- Phylum: Arthropoda
- Class: Malacostraca
- Order: Decapoda
- Suborder: Pleocyemata
- Infraorder: Brachyura
- Family: Aethridae
- Genus: Hepatus
- Species: H. pudibundus

Binomial name
- Hepatus pudibundus Herbst, 1785

= Hepatus pudibundus =

Species of crab

Hepatus pudibundus, the flecked box crab, is a crab from the class Malacostraca. They are found in the Atlantic Ocean with Brazil having a dense population of H. pudibundus, as they are one of the most commonly seen crabs in the country. Many of the studies done on H. pudibubus have occurred in the Ubatuba region of Brazil, where there is a rapid expansion of tourism that is affecting marine ecosystems.

== Taxonomy ==
Hepatus pudibundus is part of the Brachyuran superfamily Aethroidea which includes 7 recent genera. Most brachyuran crabs are located between the Tropic of Cancer and Tropic of Capricorn, and mate consistently throughout the year. H. pudibundus, H. scaber, and H.gronovii, and Osachila (O.antillensis and O.tuberosa) occur along the Brazilian coast.

Brachyura males have larger claws than females that are used for defense, fighting and possibly for reproduction interactions. In this group females are smaller because they devote most of their energy to reproduction once they are mature, and are ovigerous year round.

== Behavior and reproduction ==
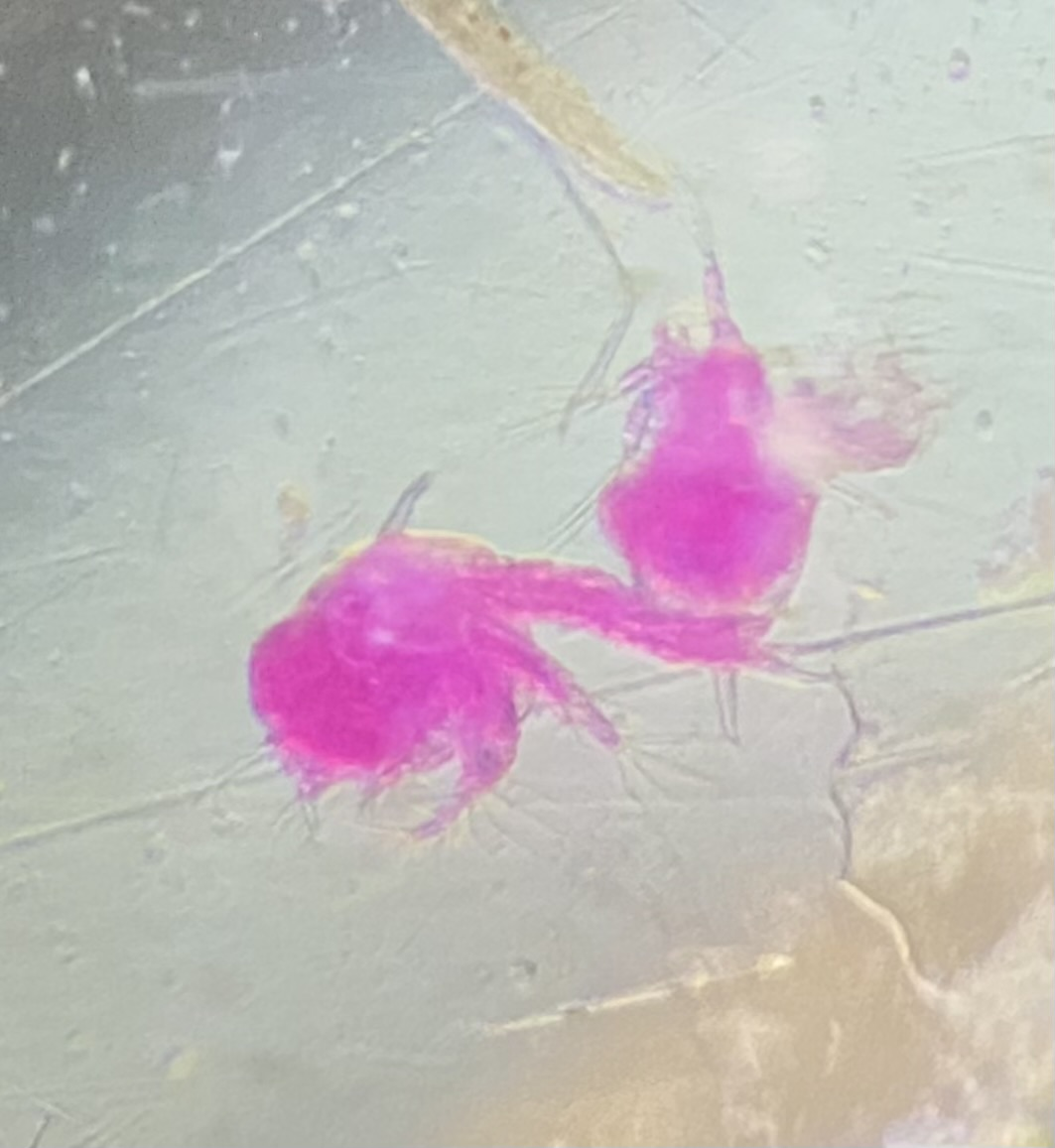
Crab larvae, called zoea, enlarged under a microscope.

The flecked box crab is an opportunistic predator meaning they will tend to eat whatever comes across their path. Because there tends to be a larger food source for these crabs during the summer, mating and therefore offspring increases when more food is available. Reproduction usually occurs mostly in the spring and then again with reduced numbers in the fall. Sexually mature males tend to be seen more often during late spring and summer while females tend to reach sexual maturity in the late winter and early spring months. Sexually mature males can mate with females in the winter and the females will hold the sperm until spring (which is the biggest time for mating but it still occurs continuously throughout the year). Female crabs mate with males and store their sperm in an organ called the spermetheca, where they can then use it to fertilize their eggs a number of times.

Shallow waters contain more protection and available food sources for females to be able to reach full reproductive maturity before moving to deeper waters. These shallow waters are also where all stages of adult males were most abundant. Fertile females can be found between 10 and 25 m deep usually in more exposed conditions as the open ocean tends to have more stable conditions, causing less stress on newly hatched larvae. This is also the perfect spot for H.pudibundus larvae to be dispersed by ocean currents. Size difference in H.pundibundus occurs as an adaptation for reproductive success, whereby larger males can protect their mate. The flecked box crab on average lives for about 19 months.

== Anatomy and morphology ==
Female crabs are generally smaller than males and molt in the winter. Egg production and reproduction require a lot of energy which is why females tend to be smaller than males. Differences in carapace width and claw size can be used to determine males from females. This is known as sexual dimorphism. Abdomen shape can be used to identify sex where females have a semicircular abdomen and males have an inverted T shape. Another way to tell the sexes apart is by the number of pleopods they have. Males have 4 pleopods total and females have 8 (set of 2 and 4).

At a carapace width between 30-40mm each sex is able to start reproducing. Females need more room for reproductive organs, as well as space for their egg mass to attach which is why they tend to have a wider carapace at the back end of their body. This difference in carapace width is controlled by the presence or absence of androgen hormones.

== Distribution and habitat ==
According to multiple studies, conducted by (de Lima et al. 2014), (Miazaki, LF. et, al. 2019), and (Reis, J. Freire, KMF. da Rosa, LC. Barreto, TMRD. 2020) H.pudibundus can be found in the Eastern Atlantic from Georgia (USA), the Gulf of Mexico, the Antilles, Venezuela, and the Guianas to the entire coast of Brazil (Amapá to Rio Grande do Sul), and in the eastern Atlantic from Guinea to South Africa. The current life stage of the crab does not affect the depth it is found at. Crabs of all life stages were found at all depths. Flecked box crabs tend to be found in shallower waters during the summer months (10-20m) and deeper waters during winter months but again are found at all depths year round. When conditions are not favorable or predators are near they burrow into sediments of silt, clay, or fine sand. Females generally outnumber males in the population.

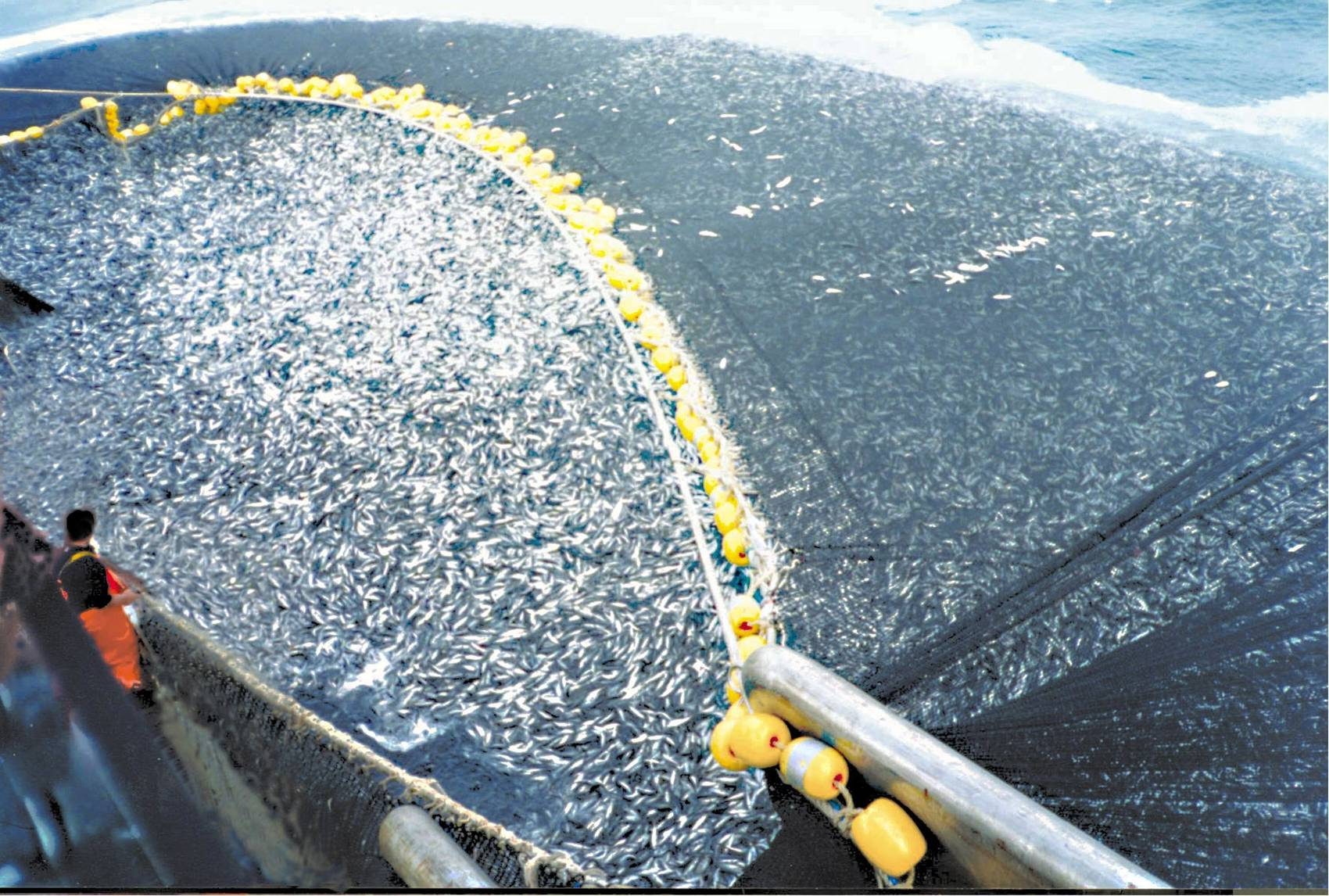
Crabs get caught as bycatch to fisheries in nets like these.

These crabs feed on phyto- and nano- plankton, detritus, and macro feeding fauna as well as molluscs, annelids and foraminifera. The crab larvae eat plankton. The South Atlantic Central Water, which flows through H.pudibundus' habitat waters, is very important because it brings in nutrients which cause an abundance of phytoplankton and subsequently any zooplankton that eat it. This larger abundance of food is very beneficial to the crab larvae. On the flip side, sediments gets stirred up during the fall and winter months from cold fronts coming in. This makes settled nutrients available again to phytoplankton, causing them to grow in number, providing a rich food source for the new crab larvae.

== Conservation status ==
The flecked box crab often gets caught as bycatch to the shrimp species X. kroyeri. Bycatch usually has devastating effects on populations, but not the speckled box crab because they get tossed back into the sea. The sorting process that takes place on fishing boats is usually a long stressful process, indicating the flecked box crab is a resilient species as most survive and are tossed back into the sea.

While many of the crabs do survive the sorting process and get tossed back into the sea, fisheries still tend to have an impact on population numbers because during the fishery off season there are very few egg bearing, or juvenile females if any. During the fishing season are when ovigerous females are present and in abundance they have a high chance of being caught as bycatch, which can then affect the number of offspring being produced.
