= Martensia projecta =

Scientific classification
- Clade: Archaeplastida
- Division: Rhodophyta
- Class: Florideophyceae
- Order: Ceramiales
- Family: Delesseriaceae
- Genus: Martensia
- Species: M. projecta

Binomial name
- Martensia projecta Y.Lee, 2005

Species of alga

Martensia projecta is a species of red algae.
