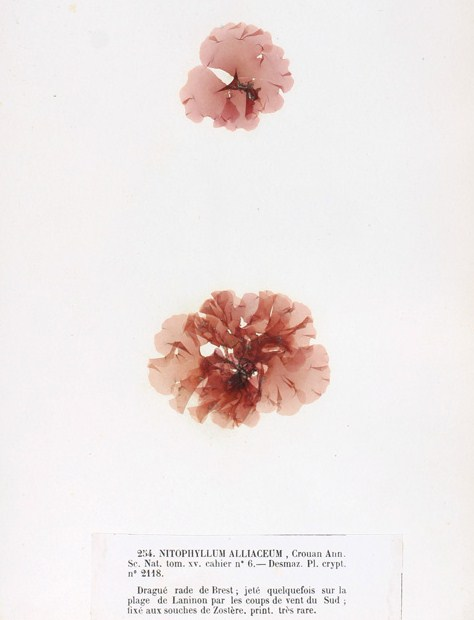
- Myriogramme alliacea

Scientific classification
- Clade: Archaeplastida
- Division: Rhodophyta
- Class: Florideophyceae
- Order: Ceramiales
- Family: Delesseriaceae
- Genus: Myriogramme; Kylin, 1924

Species
- See text

= Myriogramme =

Genus of algae

Myriogramme is a genus of red alga comprising approximately 34 species.

== Species ==
The species currently recognised are:

- M. alliacea
- M. caespitosa
- M. carnea
- M. cartilaginea
- M. ciliata
- M. costata
- M. crispata
- M. dilabida
- M. distromatica
- M. divaricata
- M. eckloniae
- M. goaensis
- M. gunniana
- M. heterostroma
- M. kerguelensis
- M. kjellmanianum
- M. kylinii
- M. livida
- M. melanesiensis
- M. minuta
- M. multilobata
- M. nightingaliensis
- M. okhaënsis
- M. polyneura
- M. prostrata
- M. pulchra
- M. quilonensis
- M. repens
- M. smithii
- M. spectabilis
- M. tristromatica
- M. undulata
- M. unistromaticum
- M. variegata
