= Acrosorium =

Scientific classification
- Clade: Archaeplastida
- Division: Rhodophyta
- Class: Florideophyceae
- Order: Ceramiales
- Family: Delesseriaceae
- Genus: Acrosorium; Zanardini ex Kützing

Genus of algae

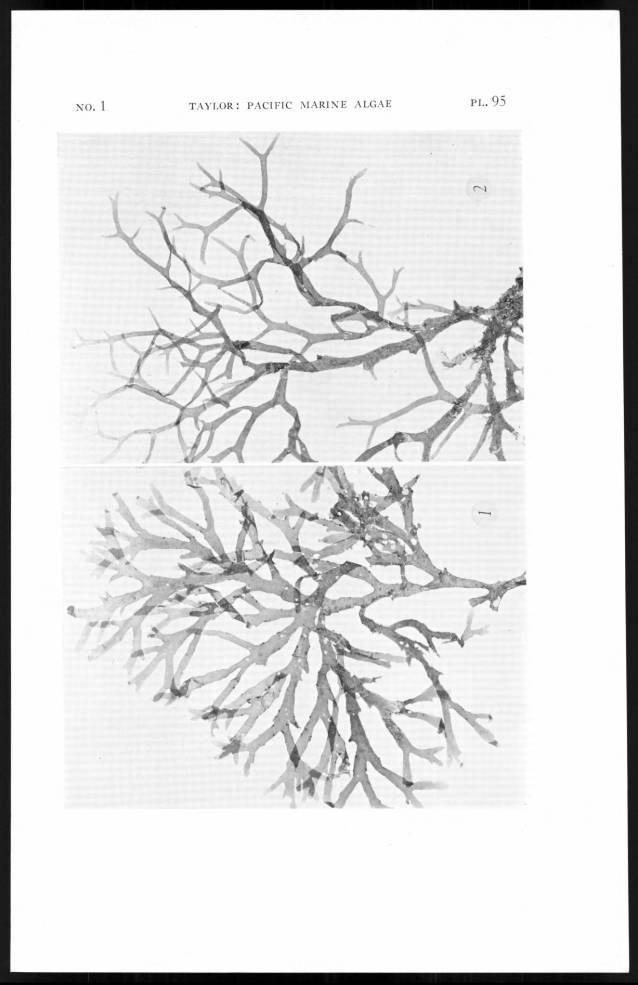
Acrosorium

Acrosorium is a genus of marine red algae.

== Species ==
AlgaeBase recognises the following species:

- Acrosorium acrospermum (J.Agardh) Kylin
- Acrosorium amphiroae Jaasund
- Acrosorium ciliolatum (Harvey) Kylin
- Acrosorium cincinnatum M.J.Wynne
- Acrosorium decumbens (J.Agardh) M.J.Wynne
- Acrosorium deformatum (Suhr) Papenfuss
- Acrosorium flabellatum Yamada
- Acrosorium fragile W.R.Taylor
- Acrosorium krishnamurthyi M.Umamaheswara Rao
- Acrosorium masculatum (Sonder ex Kützing) Papenfuss
- Acrosorium minus (Sonder) Kylin
- Acrosorium odontophorum (Sonder) Kylin
- Acrosorium okamurae Noda
- Acrosorium papenfussii W.R.Taylor
- Acrosorium polyneurum Okamura
- Acrosorium procumbens E.Y.Dawson
- Acrosorium yendoi Yamada
