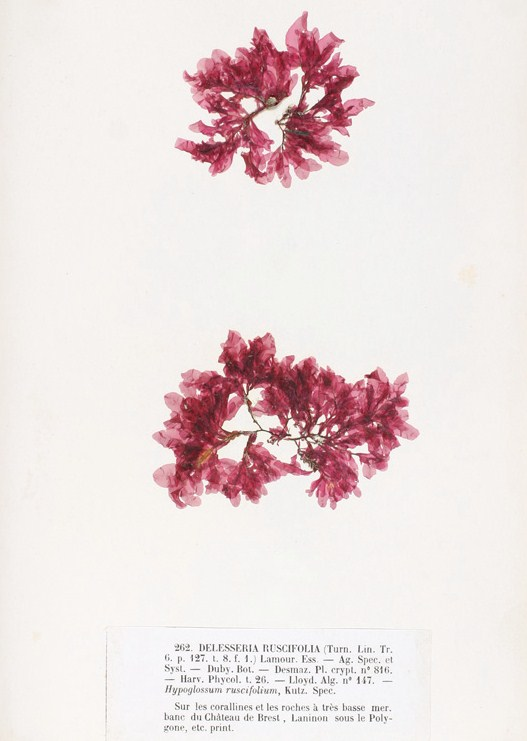
- Apoglossum ruscifolium

Scientific classification
- Clade: Archaeplastida
- Division: Rhodophyta
- Class: Florideophyceae
- Order: Ceramiales
- Family: Delesseriaceae
- Genus: Apoglossum; J.Agardh, 1898

= Apoglossum =

Genus of algae

Apoglossum is a genus of red algae belonging to the family Delesseriaceae. The genus has cosmopolitan distribution.

GBIF recognizes five species, including:

- Apoglossum gregarium (E.Y.Dawson) M.J.Wynne
- Apoglossum ruscifolium (Turner) J.Agardh
- Apoglossum unguiculescens A.J.K.Millar, 1990
