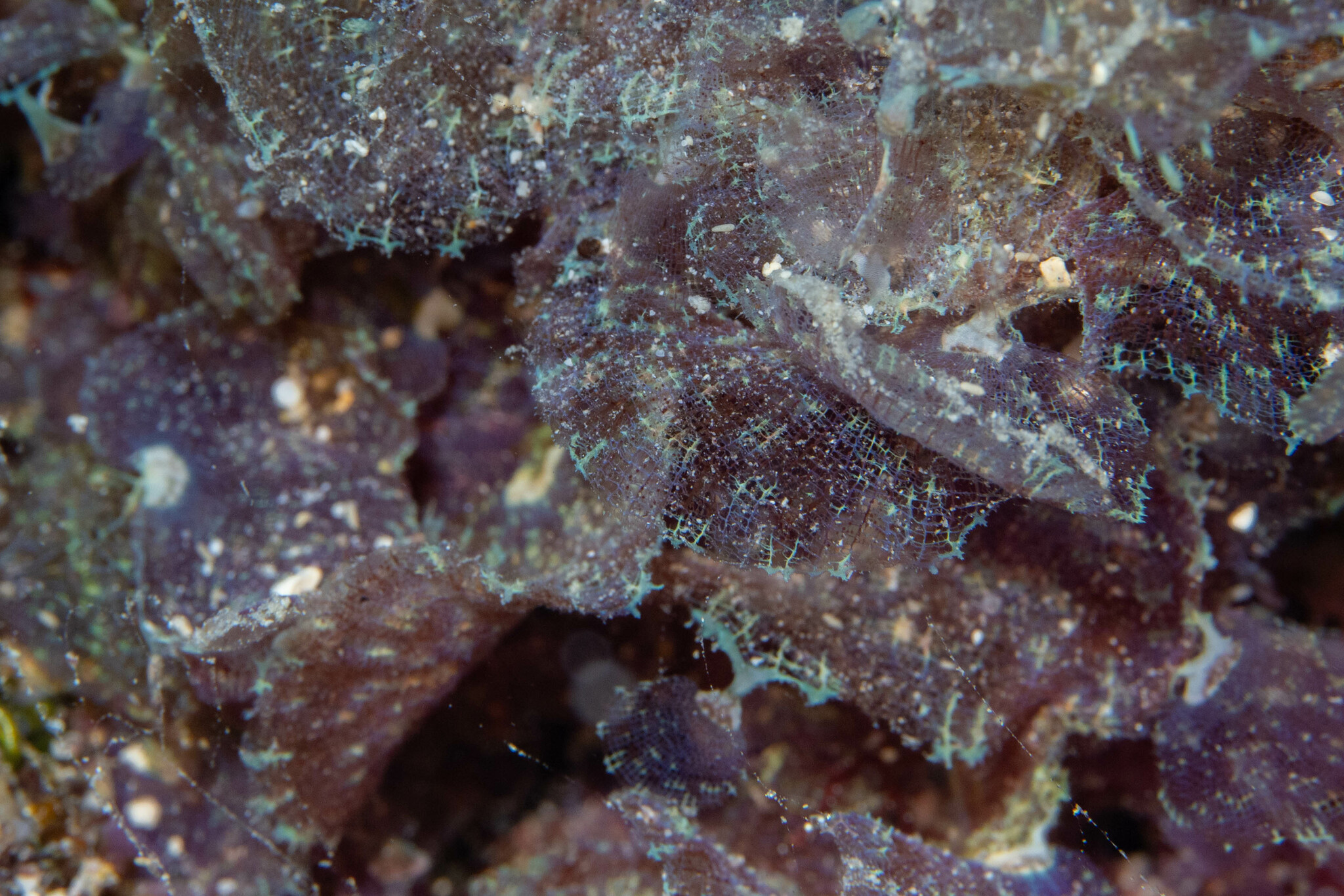

Scientific classification
- Clade: Archaeplastida
- Division: Rhodophyta
- Class: Florideophyceae
- Order: Ceramiales
- Family: Delesseriaceae
- Genus: Martensia; K.Hering, 1841

= Martensia =

Genus of algae

Martensia is a genus of red algae, containing the following species:

The genus name of Martensia is in honour of George Matthias von Martens (1788–1872), who was a German lawyer, botanist and phycologist.

The genus was circumscribed by Constantin Hering in Ann. Mag. Nat. Hist. vol.8 on page 92 in 1841.

== Species ==
- Martensia albida Y.Lee, 2006
- Martensia australis Harvey, 1855
- Martensia bibarii Y.Lee, 2004
- Martensia denticulata Harvey, 1855
- Martensia elegans Hering, 1841
- Martensia flabelliformis Harvey ex J.Agardh, 1863
- Martensia flammifolia Y.Lee, 2006
- Martensia formosana S.-M.Lin, Hommersand & Fredericq, 2004
- Martensia fragilis Harvey, 1854
- Martensia indica V.Krishnamurthy & Thomas, 1977
- Martensia jejuensis Y.Lee, 2004
- Martensia lewisiae S.-M.Lin, Hommersand & Fredericq, 2004
- Martensia martensii (F.Schmitz) S.-M.Lin, Fredericq & L.M.Liao, 2001
- Martensia natalensis S.-M.Lin, Hommersand, Fredericq & De Clerck, 2009
- Martensia palmata Y.Lee, 2005
- Martensia projecta Y.Lee, 2005
