= Drachiella aglypha =

Drachiella

Scientific classification
- Kingdom: Animalia
- Phylum: Arthropoda
- Class: Malacostraca
- Order: Decapoda
- Suborder: Pleocyemata
- Infraorder: Brachyura
- Family: Aethridae
- Genus: Drachiella
- Species: D. aglypha

Binomial name
- Drachiella aglypha (Laurie, 1906)

Genus of crabs

Drachiella aglypha is a species of marine crab found in the Indo-Pacific region.
