= Kemmler (surname) =

Kemmler is a German surname. Notable people with the surname include:

- Carl Albert Kemmler (1813–1888), German clergyman and botanical collector
- Rudy Kemmler (born surnamed Kemler; 1860–1909), U.S. baseball catcher
- William Kemmler (1860–1890), U.S. murderer; first person executed by means of electric chair
