= Calico crab =

Calico crab may refer to:

- Ovalipes ocellatus
- Hepatus epheliticus
