= Pseudogrinnellia =

Scientific classification
- Clade: Archaeplastida
- Division: Rhodophyta
- Class: Florideophyceae
- Order: Ceramiales
- Family: Delesseriaceae
- Genus: Pseudogrinnellia; M.J.Wynne, 1999

Genus of algae

Pseudogrinnellia is a genus of red alga in the family Delesseriaceae.
