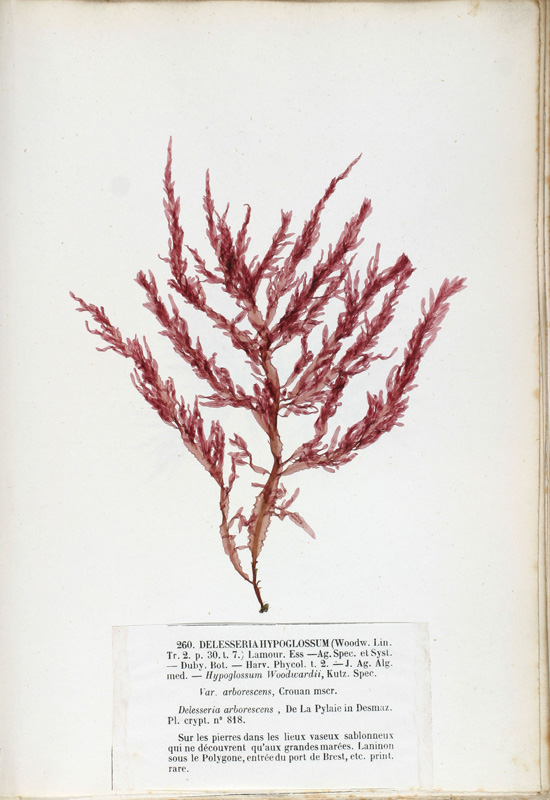
- Hypoglossum hypoglossoides

Scientific classification
- Clade: Archaeplastida
- Division: Rhodophyta
- Class: Florideophyceae
- Order: Ceramiales
- Family: Delesseriaceae
- Tribe: Hypoglosseae
- Genus: Hypoglossum; Kützing, 1843

= Hypoglossum =

Genus of algae

Hypoglossum is a genus of red algae belonging to the family Delesseriaceae.

The genus has cosmopolitan distribution.

Species:

- Hypoglossum anomalum M.J.Wynne & D.L.Ballant.
- Hypoglossum attenuatum N.L.Gardner, 1927
- Hypoglossum barbatum Okamura, 1901
- Hypoglossum caloglossoides M.J.Wynne & Kraft, 1985
- Hypoglossum hypoglossoides (Stackhouse) F.S.Collins & Hervey
- Hypoglossum retusum
- Hypoglossum simulans M.J.Wynne, I.R.Price & D.L.Ballant., 1989
- Hypoglossum tenuifolium (Harv.) J.Agardh
