= Georg Matthias von Martens =

German lawyer, botanist and phycologist

George Matthias von Martens (12 June 1788, Venice – 24 February 1872, Stuttgart) was a German lawyer, botanist and phycologist. He was the father of zoologist Eduard von Martens (1831–1904).

He studied law at the University of Tübingen, where he also attended lectures by naturalist Carl Friedrich Kielmeyer and astronomer Johann Gottlieb Friedrich von Bohnenberger. From 1818 to 1821 he worked in Ulm, afterwards being based in Stuttgart, where in 1829 he became an official interpreter for Italian, Spanish and Portuguese at the Ministry of Justice and the Interior. From 1836 onward, he held the title of councilor.

As a botanist, he collected specimens from southern Germany, Austria and northern Italy. In 1832, with Gustav Schübler, he conducted botanical investigations in southeastern Württemberg. His European collections subsequently became part of the "Naturaliencabinet" in Stuttgart. He is also known for his studies of freshwater and marine algae, especially species native to eastern Asia. In 1862 he received an honorary degree in sciences from the University of Tübingen.

In 1841, the red algae genus Martensia (family Delesseriaceae) was named in his honor by Constantin Hering.

== Selected works ==
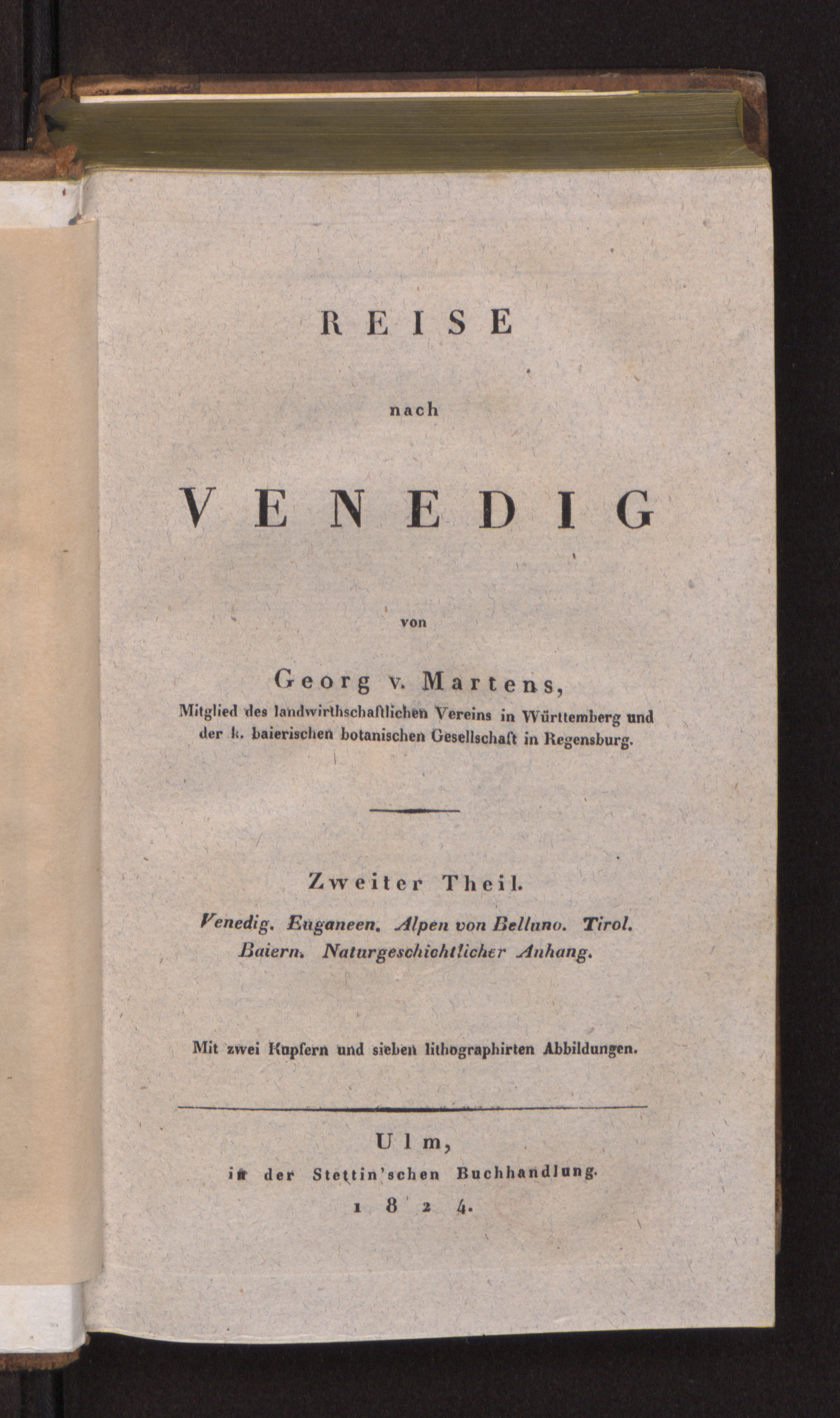
Reise nach Venedig, 1824

- Reise nach Venedig, 1824 – Journey to Venice.
- Flora von Würtemberg (with Gustav Schübler), 1834 – Flora of Würtemberg.
- Flora von Württemberg und Hohenzollern, (with Carl Albert Kemmler 1813–1888), 1865 – Flora of Württemberg and Hohenzollern.
- Die preussische Expedition nach Ost-Asien [1860-1862] : Nach amtlichen Quellen, (with Eduard von Martens and Albert Berg) 1864–1873 – The Prussian expedition to East Asia (1860–62) according to official sources.
- Die preussische Expedition nach Ost-Asien : Nach amtlichen Quellen. Botanischer Theil. Die Tange, 1866 – The Prussian expedition to East Asia, according to official sources. Botanical part: seaweed.
- "Notes on Some Japanese Algae", 1870 (with Sulpiz Kurz, published in English).
- "Algae Brasilienses circa Rio de Janeiro a clar. A. Glaziou", 1871.
