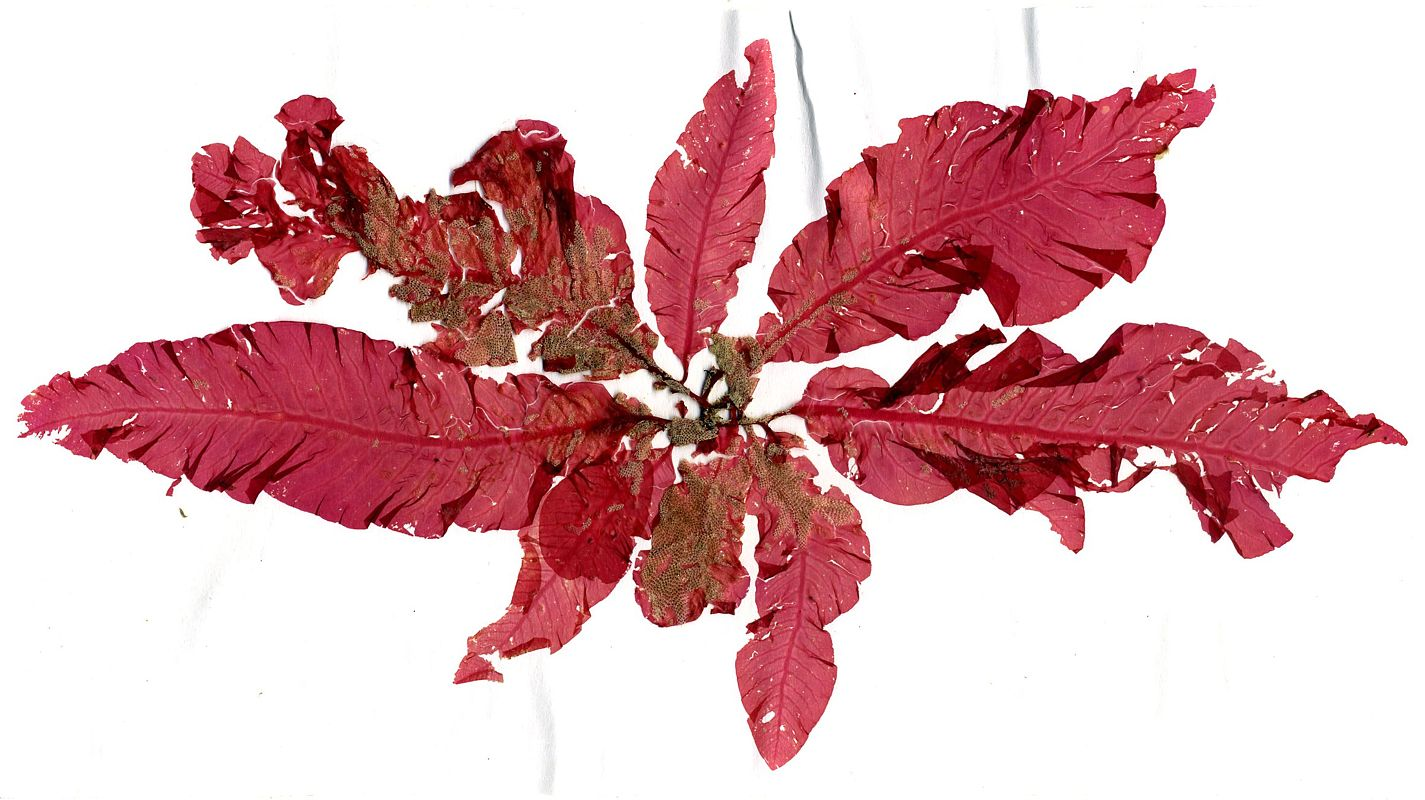
- Delesseria sanguinea

Scientific classification
- Clade: Archaeplastida
- Division: Rhodophyta
- Class: Florideophyceae
- Order: Ceramiales
- Family: Delesseriaceae
- Genus: Delesseria; J.V.F.Lamouroux, 1813

= Delesseria =

Genus of algae

Delesseria is a genus of red algae belonging to the family Delesseriaceae.

The genus has cosmopolitan distribution.

The genus name of Delesseria is in honour of Jules Paul Benjamin Delessert (1773–1847), who was a French banker and naturalist.

The genus was circumscribed by Jean Vincent Félix Lamouroux in Ann. Mus. Natl. Hist. Nat. Vol.20 on page 122 in 1813.

== Known species ==
As of May 2021;

- Delesseria baeri Ruprecht
- Delesseria crozetii Levring, 1944
- Delesseria decipiens
- Delesseria imbricata Areschoug
- Delesseria montagnei Kjellman
- Delesseria ocellata (J.V.Lamouroux) J.V.Lamouroux
- Delesseria sanguinea (Hudson) J.V.Lamouroux
