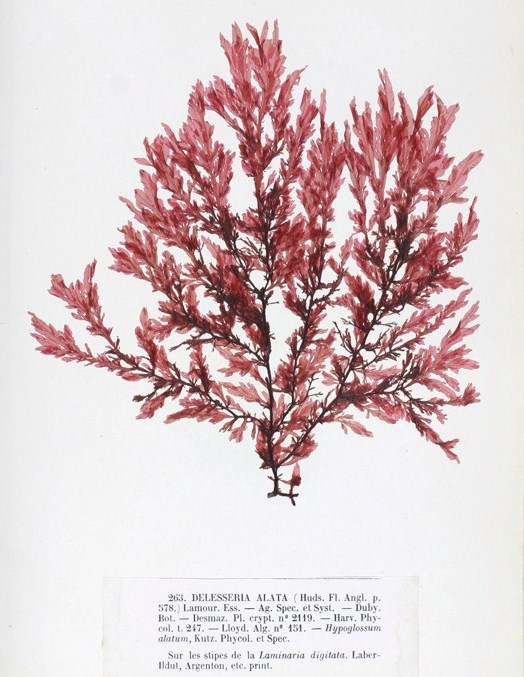
- Membranoptera alata

Scientific classification
- Domain: Eukaryota
- Clade: Archaeplastida
- Division: Rhodophyta
- Class: Florideophyceae
- Order: Ceramiales
- Family: Delesseriaceae
- Tribe: Delesserieae
- Genus: Membranoptera; Stackhouse, 1809

= Membranoptera =

Genus of red algae

Membranoptera is a genus of red algae belonging to the family Delesseriaceae.

The genus has almost cosmopolitan distribution.

== Species ==
As accepted by WoRMS:

- Alata (Hudson) Stackhouse, 1809
- Carpophylla (Kützing) Athanasiadis, 2016
- Fabriciana (Lyngbye) M.J. Wynne & G.W. Saunders, 2012
- Harveyana (J.Agardh) Kuntze, 1891
- Murrayi Børgesen, 1933
- Platyphylla (Setchell & N.L. Gardner) Kylin, 1924
- Robbeniensis Tokida, 1923
- Serrata (Postels & Ruprecht) A.D. Zinova, 1965
- Setchellii N.L. Gardner, 1926
- Spinulosa (Ruprecht) Kuntze, 1891
- Tenuis Kylin, 1924
- Weeksiae Setchell & N.L. Gardner, 1926
