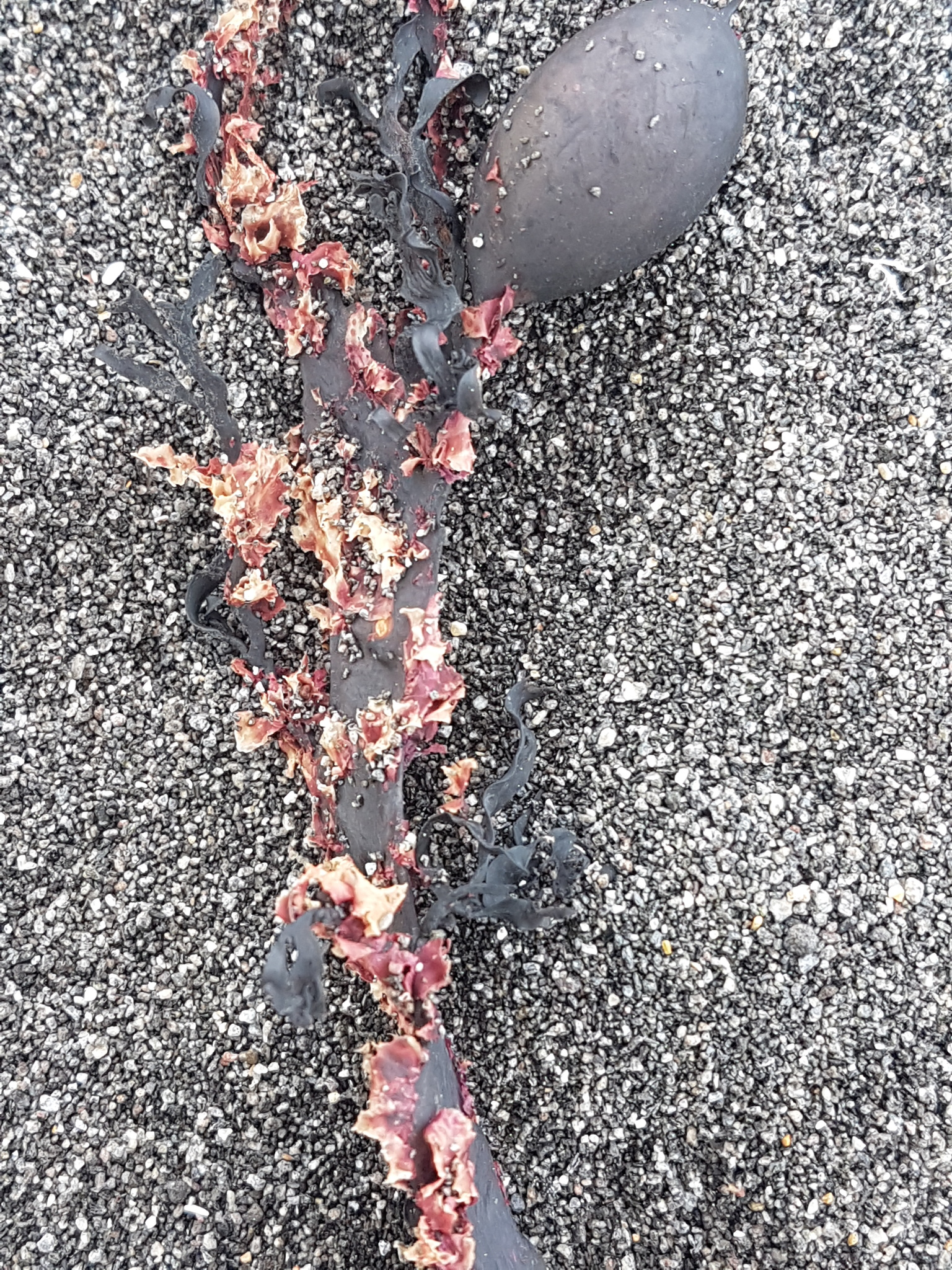
- Abroteia suborbiculare on Carpophyllum maschalocarpum

Scientific classification
- Clade: Archaeplastida
- Division: Rhodophyta
- Class: Florideophyceae
- Order: Ceramiales
- Family: Delesseriaceae
- Genus: Abroteia; Harvey ex J.Agardh

Type species
- Abroteia orbicularis J.Agardh.

= Abroteia =

Genus of algae

Abroteia is a genus of red algae.
