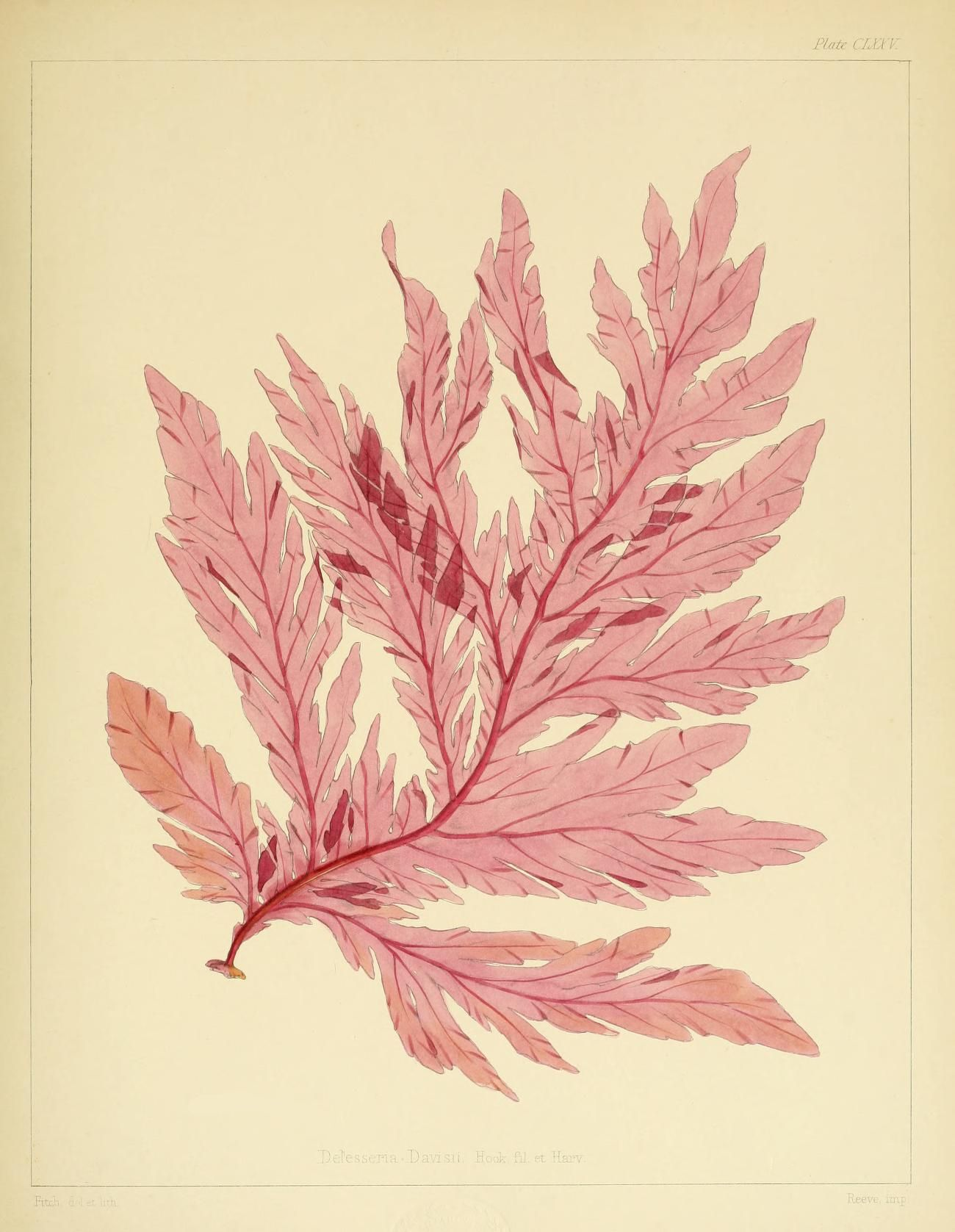
- Schizoseris griffithsia

Scientific classification
- Domain: Eukaryota
- Clade: Archaeplastida
- Division: Rhodophyta
- Class: Florideophyceae
- Order: Ceramiales
- Family: Delesseriaceae
- Genus: Schizoseris; Kylin

= Schizoseris =

Genus of algae

Schizoseris is a genus of marine red algae.
