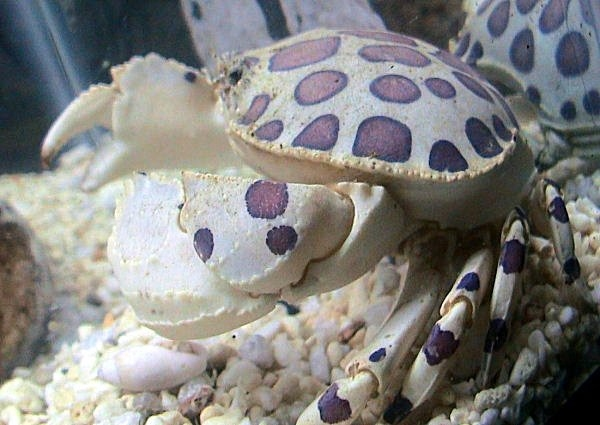
- Hepatus epheliticus (Linnaeus, 1763)

Scientific classification
- Kingdom: Animalia
- Phylum: Arthropoda
- Class: Malacostraca
- Order: Decapoda
- Suborder: Pleocyemata
- Infraorder: Brachyura
- Family: Aethridae
- Genus: Hepatus; Latreille, 1802

Type species
- Calappa angustata Fabricius, 1798

= Hepatus =

Genus of crabs

Hepatus is a genus of crabs in the family Aethridae, containing seven extant species, plus some fossil species:

- Hepatus chiliensis H. Milne-Edwards, 1837
- Hepatus epheliticus (Linnaeus, 1763)
- Hepatus gronovii Holthuis, 1959
- Hepatus kossmanni Neumann, 1878
- Hepatus lineatus Rathbun, 1898
- Hepatus pudibundus (Herbst, 1785)
- Hepatus scaber Holthuis, 1959

Both H. chiliensis and H. lineatus are also known as fossils. The other fossil species include:

- Hepatus bottomsi Blow, 2003
- Hepatus lineatus Rathbun, 1898
- Hepatus nodosus Collins & Morris, 1976
- Hepatus praecox Collins et al., 1996
- Hepatus spinimarginatus Feldmann et al., 2005
