= Sakaila =

Scientific classification
- Kingdom: Animalia
- Phylum: Arthropoda
- Class: Malacostraca
- Order: Decapoda
- Suborder: Pleocyemata
- Infraorder: Brachyura
- Family: Aethridae
- Genus: Sakaila; Manning & Holthuis, 1981

Genus of crabs

Sakalia is a genus of crabs in the family Aethridae, and was first described in 1981 by Raymond Manning and Lipke Holthuis.

The following species are accepted by WoRMS:

- Sakaila africana Manning & Holthuis, 1981
- †Sakaila italica Beschin, De Angeli, Checchi & Zarantonello, 2016
- Sakaila imperialis (Sakai, 1963)
- Sakaila japonica (Sakai, 1963)
- Sakaila wanawana Martin, Godwin & Moffitt, 2009
