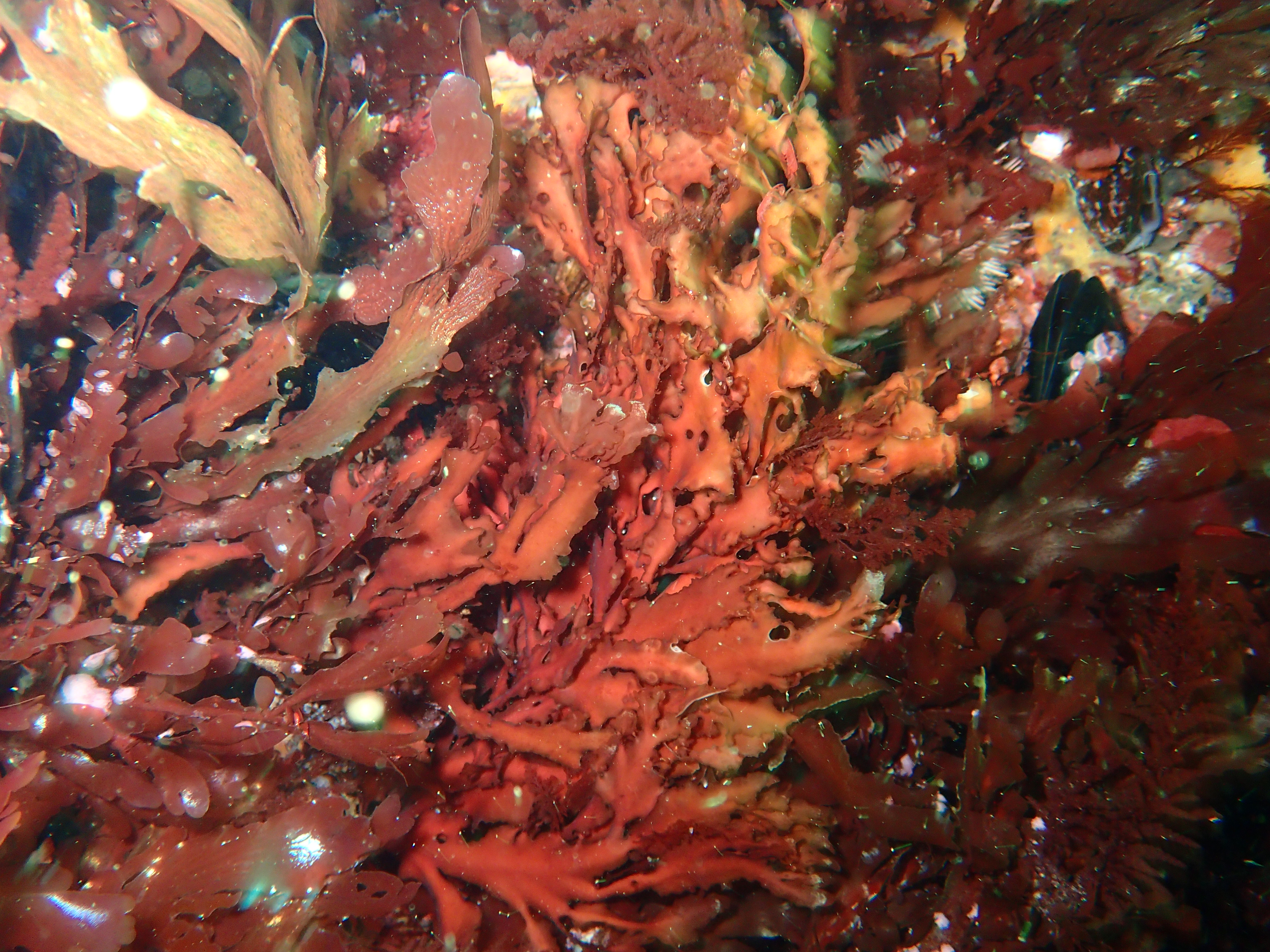

Scientific classification
- Clade: Archaeplastida
- Division: Rhodophyta
- Class: Florideophyceae
- Order: Ceramiales
- Family: Delesseriaceae
- Genus: Neuroglossum; Kützing

Synonyms
- Choreocolax; Delesseria; Myriogramme; Neuroglossum; Nitophyllum

= Neuroglossum =

Genus of algae

Neuroglossum is a genus of marine red algae.
