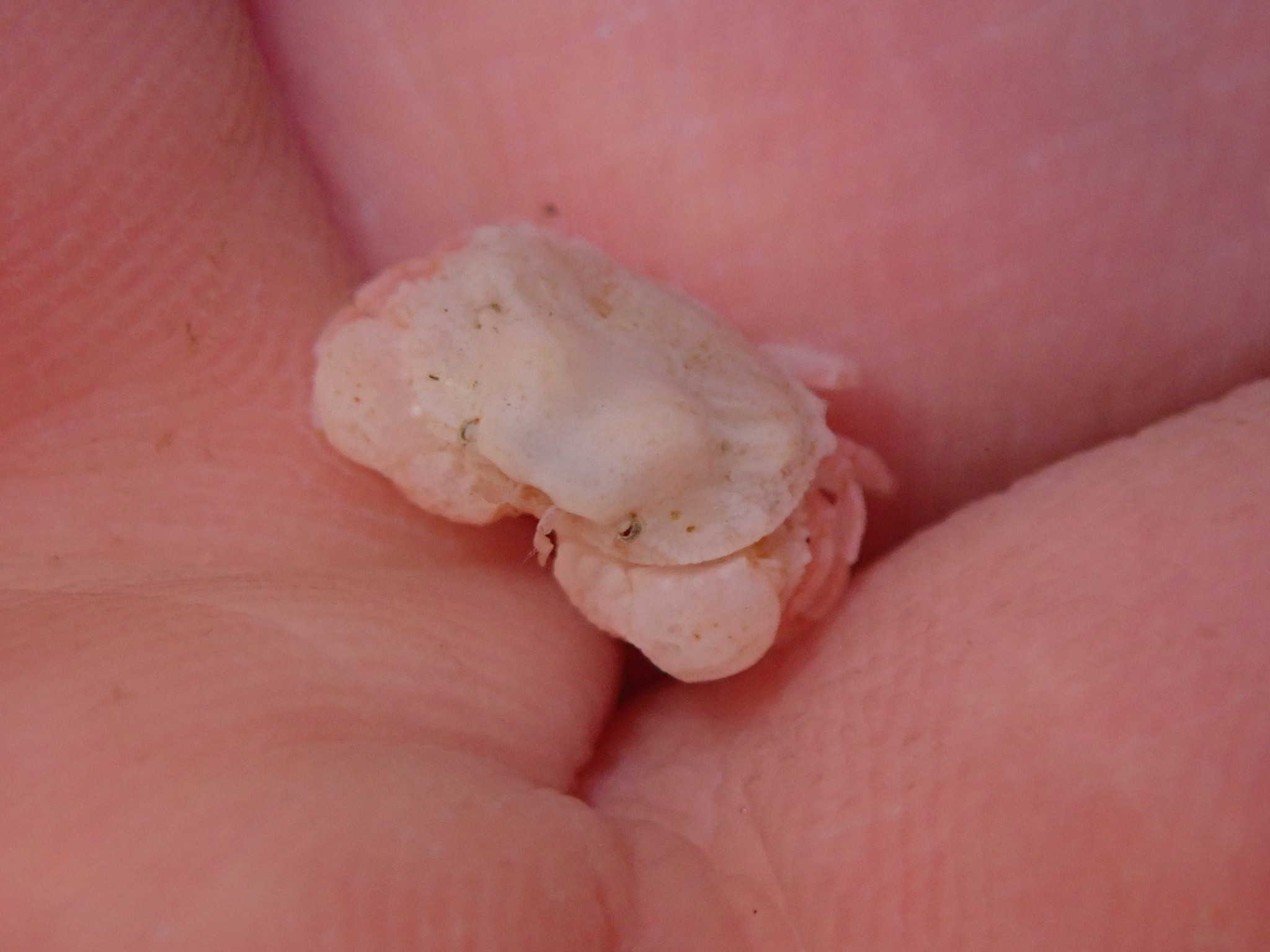
- Actaeomorpha erosa

Scientific classification
- Kingdom: Animalia
- Phylum: Arthropoda
- Class: Malacostraca
- Order: Decapoda
- Suborder: Pleocyemata
- Infraorder: Brachyura
- Family: Aethridae
- Genus: Actaeomorpha; Miers, 1877

= Actaeomorpha =

Genus of crabs

Actaeomorpha is a genus of crabs in the family Aethridae, containing the following species:

- Actaeomorpha alvae Boone, 1934
- Actaeomorpha erosa Miers, 1877
- Actaeomorpha punctata Edmondson, 1935
- Actaeomorpha angulata Ihle, 1918
- Actaeomorpha lapillula Alcock, 1896
- Actaeomorpha morum Alcock, 1896
