= Hepatella =

Hepatella Temporal range: Lower Miocene–recent

Scientific classification
- Kingdom: Animalia
- Phylum: Arthropoda
- Class: Malacostraca
- Order: Decapoda
- Suborder: Pleocyemata
- Infraorder: Brachyura
- Family: Aethridae
- Genus: Hepatella; Smith, 1869
- Species: H. amica

Binomial name
- Hepatella amica SI Smith, 1869

Genus of crabs

Hepatella amica is a genus of crabs in the family Aethridae. It is the only species in the genus Hepatella.
