= The Aethra Chronicles =

- Title screen
- Designer(s): Michael W. Lawrence
- Programmer(s): Michael W. Lawrence
- Artist(s): Philip Mann
- Composer(s): Matthew Mooney
- Platform(s): MS-DOS
- Release: 1994
- Genre(s): Role-playing
- Mode(s): Single-player

The Aethra Chronicles - Volume One: Celystra's Bane or The Aethra Chronicles (also known as Aethra for short) is an MS-DOS role-playing video game released as shareware in 1994. The game is based on the Rolemaster game system, a Pencil & Paper role playing game. It was written, mostly as a one-man project, by Michael Lawrence with some help from others for the graphics and sound/music.

The first volume of the game is split into three chapters: The Book of Prophecy, Gems of Power, and Demons Might. The Book of Prophecy was freely distributed. The other two chapters could be bought through information in the first chapter. Two additional volumes were planned, but not created.

== Plot ==
The small kingdom of Celystra was prosperous under its old king, "Korros the Wise". The prince, Lythare, has ascended to the throne and his wife has given birth to a child on his coronation day. However, two days later, the newborn infant disappears, presumed kidnapped. Lythare blames the kingdom's Champion Knight-Paladin, as well as several members of the court for failing to protect the child, and imprisons them in the dungeon. The Champion's son, knowing that his father must not have deserved imprisonment, sets out on a quest to find the baby with his two companions.

The Aethra Chronicles is a fantasy role playing game similar in style to Ultima and Bards Tale. The player is on a quest to discover who has kidnapped the newborn prince and why. The game starts with the player creating his character and two companions. Additional companions may be hired or found at some point in the game. The quest will take the characters to every town and village in the land. Many fearsome creatures will have to be faced. There are over a hundred different monsters from the lowly Giant Rat to the fearsome Red Dragon.

— Advertizer as used on bulletin board systems

== Gameplay ==
The game is mostly played through a bird's eye view perspective where the camera is either showing the countryside, a town or a dungeon. Each version 'zooms in' closer to the ground and the resulting view shows more detail. For combat, the game uses a side view which is dynamically constructed from the location the player's party was in just before combat commenced.

The player is in control of the protagonist and two other characters and sets out to investigate the imprisonment of his or her father by the new King. Additional henchmen can be hired for a total of six controllable characters.

== Confusion about the sequels ==
When the first volume of 'Celystra's Bane' was made and released, it contained three chapters: 'The Book of Prophecy', 'Gems of Power' and 'Demons Might'. As was typical with shareware games, the first chapter could be freely distributed, with the other two available only to registered users. The second and third volumes were never made. Since the shareware version only contained a single chapter, some people assumed that the second and third 'chapters' (instead of volumes) were never made and the game was left incomplete. This confusion sometimes still survives some 20 years after the game's release.

== Reception ==
The Aethra Chronicles received average reviews upon release. Comparing the game to the Ultima series, Charles Hathaway of PC Review praised the adventure gameplay and variety of content in spite of the "standard fare" gameplay and "run of the mill graphics". Similarly, PC Games noted the game did not "hold a candle" to Ultima, but commended the game's "convincing" story and the party-based gameplay easy to manage. Describing the game as "complex", PC Joker highlighted the game as an "exciting and epic adventure", finding the game "easy to handle". Pelit compared the game to the Gold Box series and concluded that it's a good game considering the price point.
