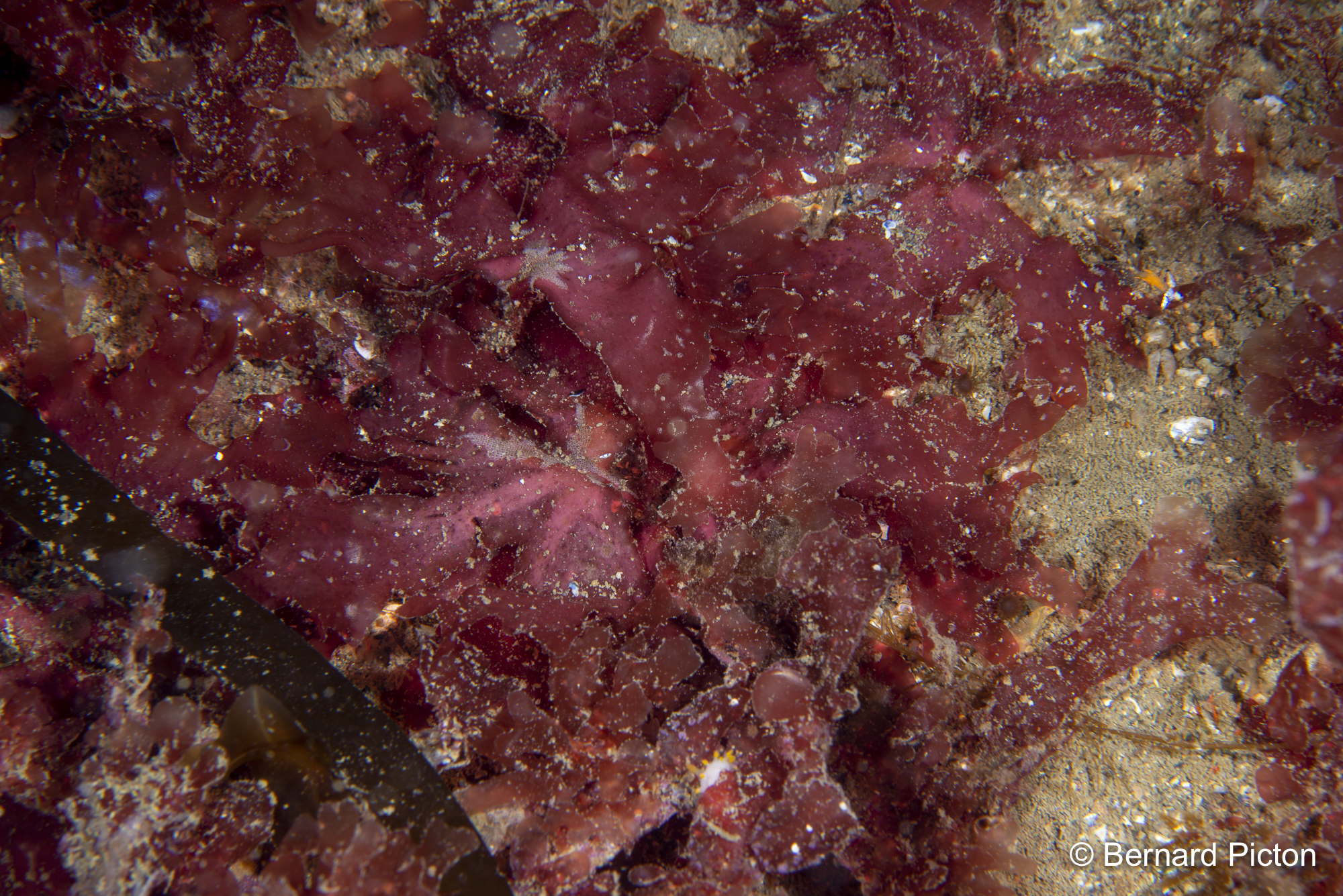
- Drachiella spectabilis

Scientific classification
- Clade: Archaeplastida
- Division: Rhodophyta
- Class: Florideophyceae
- Order: Ceramiales
- Family: Delesseriaceae
- Genus: Drachiella; J.Ernst & Feldmann

= Drachiella (alga) =

Genus of algae

Drachiella is a genus of marine red alga. It has scaly thickenings; also "rhizoids fringing openings". It is found below the kelp zone in areas exposed to moderate wave action; it is iridescent, and consists of a short, narrow stipe broadening into midribless thalli which reach 7 cm in length. Drachiella exhibits diffuse intercalary and marginal growth, and rhizoids are common along the margins, which it uses for anchorage. Pit connections often link adjoining cells.

== Taxonomy ==
One species in the genus, Drachiella heterocarpa has five homotypic synonyms (i.e. with the same specific epithet, but different genus classification) and three heterotypic synonyms (i.e. different genus and species names entirely).

== Distribution ==
Drachiella spectabilis has been recorded from Inistrahull in Ireland.
