= Drachiella (crab) =

Scientific classification
- Kingdom: Animalia
- Phylum: Arthropoda
- Class: Malacostraca
- Order: Decapoda
- Suborder: Pleocyemata
- Infraorder: Brachyura
- Family: Aethridae
- Genus: Drachiella; Guinot, 1976

Genus of crabs

Drachiella is a genus of crabs in the family Aethridae, containing one fossil species, and the following species:

- Drachiella aglypha (Laurie, 1906)
- Drachiella angulata (Ihle, 1918)
- Drachiella caelata Takeda & Tachikawa, 1995
- Drachiella lapillula (Alcock, 1896)
- Drachiella morum (Alcock, 1896)
- Drachiella sculpta (Haswell, 1879)
