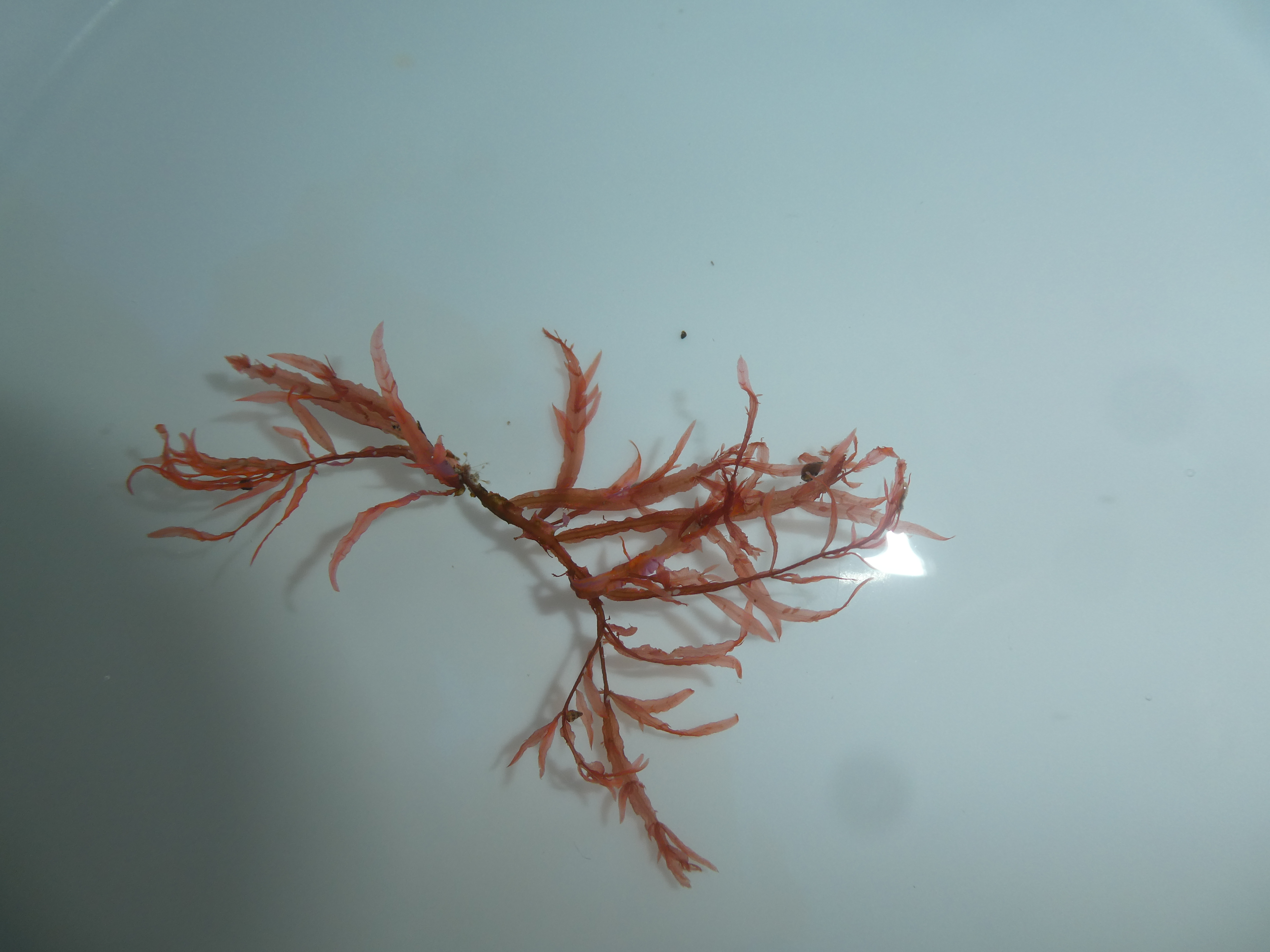

Scientific classification
- Domain: Eukaryota
- Clade: Archaeplastida
- Division: Rhodophyta
- Class: Florideophyceae
- Order: Ceramiales
- Family: Delesseriaceae
- Genus: Hypoglossum
- Species: H. hypoglossoides

Binomial name
- Hypoglossum hypoglossoides (Stackhouse) Collins & Hervey

= Hypoglossum hypoglossoides =

Red marine alga

Hypoglossum hypoglossoides, known as under tongue weed, is a small red marine alga in the family Delesseriaceae.

== Description ==
Hypoglossum hypoglossoides is a small red alga growing as monostromatic blades in tufts to a length of 30 cm and 0.8 cm wide. The lateral branches grow as blades which, like the primary blade, has a midrib. All the blades have a lanceolate or acute apices. All the blades lack lateral veins.

== Reproduction ==
The plants are dioecious. Spermatangial sori are formed on the blades on either side of the midrib. Cystocarps develop singly on the blades.

== Habitat ==
Found in the littoral and sublittoral on rock or epiphytically on other large algae.

== Distribution ==
Found on the shores of Ireland, Great Britain, Isle of Man and the Channel Islands. Further south in Spain and the Mediterranean, as well as North Carolina to Brazil.
