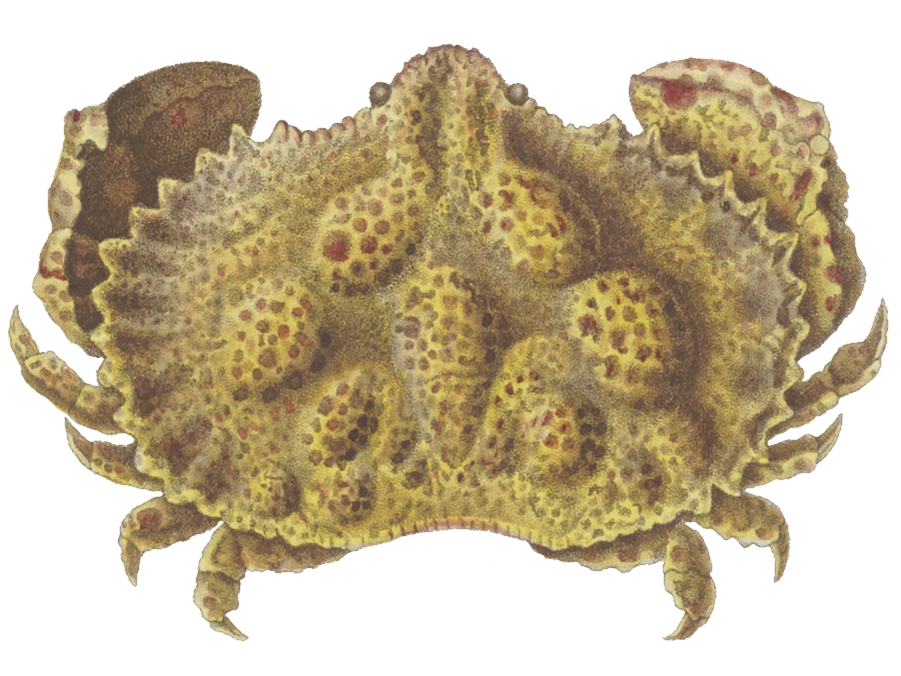
- Aethra scruposa

Scientific classification
- Kingdom: Animalia
- Phylum: Arthropoda
- Class: Malacostraca
- Order: Decapoda
- Suborder: Pleocyemata
- Infraorder: Brachyura
- Family: Aethridae
- Genus: Aethra; Latreille in Cuvier, 1816

= Aethra (crab) =

Genus of crabs

Aethra is a genus of crabs in the family Aethridae, containing the following species:

- Aethra edentata Edmondson, 1951
- Aethra scruposa (Linnaeus, 1764)
- Aethra scutata Smith, 1869
- Aethra seychellensis Takeda, 1975
- †Aethra stalennyii Ossó, 2018
