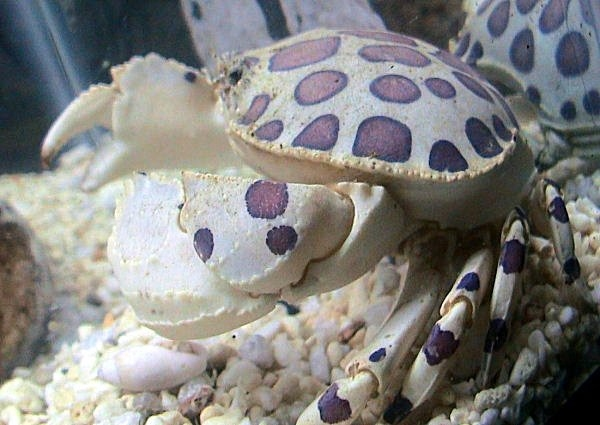

Scientific classification
- Kingdom: Animalia
- Phylum: Arthropoda
- Class: Malacostraca
- Order: Decapoda
- Suborder: Pleocyemata
- Infraorder: Brachyura
- Family: Aethridae
- Genus: Hepatus
- Species: H. epheliticus

Binomial name
- Hepatus epheliticus (Linnaeus, 1763)

Synonyms
- Cancer epheliticus Linnaeus, 1763; Cancer decorus Herbst, 1803; Cancer vanbenedenii Herklots, 1852

= Hepatus epheliticus =

Species of crab

Hepatus epheliticus, known by various names, including the calico crab (not to be confused with Ovalipes ocellatus) and Dolly Varden crab, is a species of crab. It lives in shallow water in the western Atlantic Ocean from the Chesapeake Bay to the Dominican Republic. It has a 3-inch (76 mm)–wide carapace adorned with large red spots with darker outlines.

== Description ==
Hepatus epheliticus grows to 3 inches (76 mm) across the carapace, which is covered in large patches of red color, which may join up into lines or other patterns. The spots are outlined in a darker color; in some crabs, only the darker rings are visible.

== Distribution ==
The range of H. epheliticus extends from the Chesapeake Bay southwards, including the whole of the Gulf of Mexico, and as far south as Jamaica and the Dominican Republic.

== Ecology and life cycle ==
Hepatus epheliticus lives at depths of up to 46 m (151 ft) on sandy and muddy substrates. It often carries the sea anemone Calliactis tricolor on its back, or lies buried in the sand, with only its eyes exposed.

Reproduction occurs in summer, as shown by the occurrence of "berried" (egg-bearing) females. The eggs are held by the female until they hatch; there are five planktonic zoea stages.

== Taxonomy ==
Hepatus epheliticus was first described, under the name Cancer epheliticus, by Carl Linnaeus in his 1763 work Centuria Insectorum, based on specimens from Carolina sent to him by Alexander Garden. Subjective synonyms of H. epheliticus include Cancer decorus, published by Johann Friedrich Wilhelm Herbst in 1803, and Cancer vanbenedenii, published by Jan Adrian (or Janus Adrianus) Herklots in 1852.

Hepatus epheliticus is known by several common names, including calico box crab, calico crab, Gulf calico crab, and Dolly Varden crab.
