= AETHRA Componentes Automotivos =

AETHRA is a Brazilian company, founded in 1974 in Minas Gerais, that applies technology to develop and manufacture automotive systems to the global market.

AETHRA is present in the industrial sector over 30 years. Since early foundation, Hammer Indústria de Autopeças Ltda, started to produce stamped components, establishing as auto parts supplier in the Brazilian market. With increasing market demands, AETHRA expanded to new units to meet both the development of automotive components for new Auto vehicles, and the manufacture of tooling for the production of stamped components.

Emerging from such intensive investments, AETHRA became one of the largest tooling construction companies in Latin America, also including surface parts that AETHRA has attained in the manufacturing of stamped components either small, medium and large-sized. Also, AETHRA began to supply assemblies and develop new products, promoting the continuous growth of its activities in engineering, tooling and mass production expansion.

In 2003, AETHRA has included in its production the assembly of complete truck cabins. AETHRA has become major player in vehicle development in the Brazilian market, offering everything from engineering services with modern CAD / CAM / CAE workstations, as well as in the construction of soft-toolings, prototypes, 5D laser cutting, development of final tooling, welding lines, assembling and mass production with JIT logistics in several automotive production poles in Brazil.
