= Carl Albert Kemmler =

German clergyman and botanical collector

Carl Albert Kemmler (14 August 1813, Apfelhof bei Mergentheim – 1 November 1888, Donnstetten) was a German clergyman and botanical collector.

From 1847 to 1863 he served as a pastor in Untersontheim, afterwards performing a similar role in the town of Donnstetten. As a botanist, he collected plants in Württemberg. His personal herbarium was donated to the University of Hohenheim in Stuttgart, and his large collection of lichens were sent to the Staatliches Museum für Naturkunde Stuttgart, but was destroyed during World War II.

With Georg Matthias von Martens, he was co-author of "Flora von Württemberg und Hohenzollern" (1865). In 1861 Gustav Wilhelm Körber named the lichen genus Kemmleria (synonym Buellia) in his honor.
