= Osachila =

Scientific classification
- Kingdom: Animalia
- Phylum: Arthropoda
- Class: Malacostraca
- Order: Decapoda
- Suborder: Pleocyemata
- Infraorder: Brachyura
- Family: Aethridae
- Genus: Osachila; Stimpson, 1871

Genus of crabs

Osachila is a genus of crabs in the family Aethridae, containing three fossil species, and the following extant species:

- Osachila acuta Stimpson, 1871
- Osachila antillensis Rathbun, 1916
- Osachila expansa Takeda, 1977
- Osachila galapagensis Rathbun, 1935
- Osachila kaiserae Zimmerman & Martin, 1999
- Osachila lata Faxon, 1893
- Osachila levis Rathbun, 1898
- Osachila semilevis Rathbun, 1916
- Osachila sona Garth, 1940
- Osachila stimpsonii Studer, 1883
- Osachila tuberosa Stimpson, 1871
