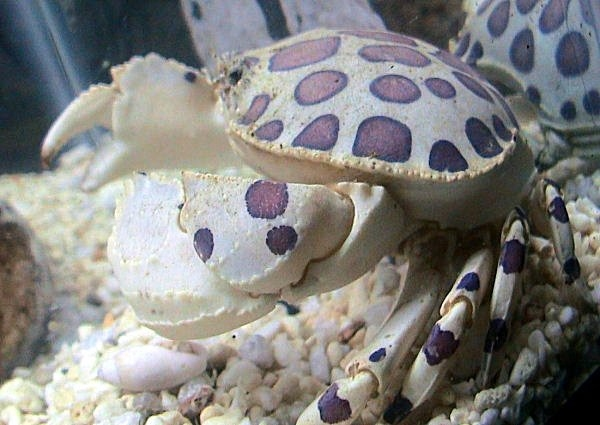
- Hepatus epheliticus

Scientific classification
- Kingdom: Animalia
- Phylum: Arthropoda
- Class: Malacostraca
- Order: Decapoda
- Suborder: Pleocyemata
- Clade: Reptantia
- Infraorder: Brachyura
- Section: Eubrachyura
- Subsection: Heterotremata
- Superfamily: Aethroidea; Dana, 1851
- Family: Aethridae; Dana, 1851

= Aethridae =

Family of crabs

The Aethridae are a family of crabs in their own superfamily, Aethroidea. It contains these genera (extinct genera marked †):

- Actaeomorpha Miers, 1877
- Aethra Latreille in Cuvier, 1816
- Drachiella Guinot, in Serene & Soh, 1976
- †Eohepatella Beschin & De Angeli, 2017
- †Eriosachila Blow & Manning, 1996
- Hepatella Smith, in Verrill, 1869
- †Hepatiscus Bittner, 1875
- Hepatus Latreille, 1802
- †Ilerdapatiscus Artal & Van Bakel, 2018
- †Latuxanthides De Angeli & Ceccon, 2015
- †Mainhepatiscus De Angeli & Beschin, 1999
- Miohepatus Lima, Silva, Aguilera, Pinheiro & Santana, 2023
- Osachila Stimpson, 1871
- †Politohepatiscus Beschin, Busulini & Tessier in Beschin, Busulini, Fornaciari, Papazzoni & Tessier, 2018
- †Priabonella Beschin, De Angeli, Checchi & Mietto, 2006
- Sakaila Manning & Holthuis, 1981
