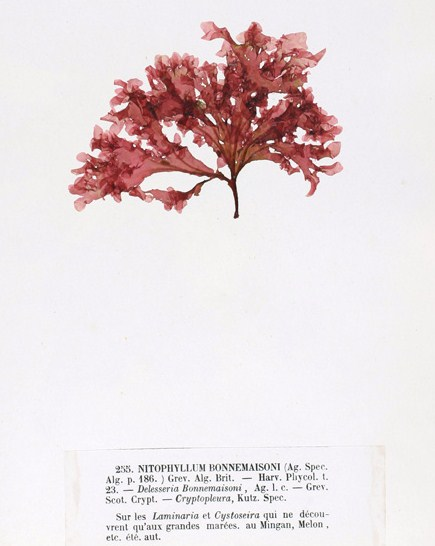
- Haraldiophyllum bonnemaisonii

Scientific classification
- Domain: Eukaryota
- Supergroup: Archaeplastida
- Division: Rhodophyta
- Class: Florideophyceae
- Order: Ceramiales
- Family: Delesseriaceae; Bory

Subfamilies and tribes
- Delesseroideae; Botryocarpeae; Claudeeae; Congregatocarpeae; Delesserieae; Grinnellieae; Hypoglosseae; Membranoptereae; Sympodophylleae; Wynneophycuseae; Zinovaeeae; Heterosiphonioideae; Nitophylloideae; Martensieae; Neuroglosseae; Nitophylleae; Papenfussieae; Phycodryoideae; Cryptopleureae; Myriogrammeae; Phycodryeae; Sarcomenioideae; Apoglosseae; Caloglosseae; Halydictyeae; Sarcomenieae; Dicroglosseae

= Delesseriaceae =

Family of algae

The Delesseriaceae is a family of about 100 genera of freshwater and marine red alga.

== Genera ==
As accepted by AlgaeBase (with amount of species per genus);

Subfamily Delesserioideae Stizenberger (124)

- Tribe Botryocarpeae M.J.Wynne (12)
  - Botryocarpa Greville - 1 sp.
  - Hemineura Harvey - 2 spp.
  - Laingia Kylin - 2 spp.
  - Marionella F.S. Wagner - 2 spp.
  - Patulophycus A.J.K. Millar & M.J. Wynne - 1 sp.
  - Pseudonitophylla M.L. Mendoza - 1 sp.
  - Pseudophycodrys Skottsberg - 2 spp.
  - Rhodokrambe R.L. Moe - 1 sp.
- Tribe Claudeeae M.J.Wynne (8)
  - Claudea J.V. Lamouroux - 3 spp.
  - Vanvoorstia Harvey - 5 spp.
- Tribe Congregatocarpeae M.J.Wynne (3)
  - Congregatocarpus Mikami - 1 sp.
  - Neohypophyllum Wynne - 1 sp.
  - Tokidadendron Wynne - 1 sp.
- Tribe Delesserieae J.Agardh (19)
  - Cumathamnion M.J. Wynne & K. Daniels - 3 spp.
  - Delesseria J.V. Lamouroux - 10 spp.
  - Heteroglossum A. Zinova - 2 spp.
  - Microrhinus Skottsberg - 1 sp.
  - Odontolaingia Mendoza - 1 sp.
  - Phycodrina M.J. Wynne - 1 sp.
  - Pseudogrinnellia M.J.Wynne - 1 sp.
- Tribe Grinnellieae M.J.Wynne (2)
  - Grinnellia Harvey - 2 spp.
- Tribe Hypoglosseae M.J.Wynne (55)
  - Bartoniella Kylin - 1 sp.
  - Branchioglossum Kylin - 8 spp.
  - Chauviniella Papenfuss - 2 spp.
  - Duckerella Wynne - 1 sp.
  - Frikkiella M.J. Wynne & C.W. Schneider - 2 spp.
  - Hypoglossum Kützing - 33 spp.
  - Phitycolax M.J. Wynne & Scott - 1 sp.
  - Phitymophora J. Agardh - 3 spp.
  - Pseudobranchioglossum M. Bodard - 1 sp.
  - Tsengiella J. Zhang & B.M. Xia - 1 sp.
  - Yoshidaphycus Mikami - 1 sp.
  - Zellera G. Martens - 1 sp.
- Tribe Membranoptereae M.J.Wynne (21)
  - Austrofolium M.J. Wynne - 3 spp.
  - Holmesia J. Agardh - 1 sp.
  - Loranthophycus E.Y. Dawson - 1 sp.
  - Membranoptera Stackhouse - 11 spp.
  - Neoholmesia Mikami - 3 spp.
  - Pantoneura Kylin - 2 spp.
- Tribe Sympodophylleae Shepley & Womersley (1)
  - Sympodophyllum E.A. Shepley & H.B.S. Womersley - 1 sp.
- Tribe Wynneophycuseae S.Y.Jeong, B.Y.Won, Fredericq & T.O.Cho (1)
  - Wynneophycus S.Y.Jeong, B.Y.Won, Fredericq & T.O.Cho, 2016 - 1 sp.
- Tribe Zinovaeeae M.J.Wynne (2)
  - Kurogia Yoshida - 1 sp.
  - Zinovaea M.J. Wynne - 1 sp.

Subfamily Heterosiphonioideae H.-G.Choi, Kraft, I.K.Lee & G.W.Saunders (45)

  - Colacodasya F.Schmitz - 3 spp.
  - Dasyella Falkenberg - 1 sp.
  - Dictyurus Bory - 4 spp.
  - Heterosiphonia Montagne - 33 spp.
  - Sinosiphonia C.K.Tseng & B.L.Zheng - 1 sp.
  - Thuretia Decaisne - 3 spp.

Subfamily Nitophylloideae Stizenberger (94)

- Tribe Martensieae M.J.Wynne (24)
  - Martensia K. Hering - 24 spp.
- Tribe Neuroglosseae J.Agardh (19)
  - Abroteia Hervey - 1 sp.
  - Drachiella J. Ernst & Feldmann - 3 spp.
  - Nancythalia A.J.K. Millar & W.A. Nelson - 1 sp.
  - Neuroglossum Kützing - 3 spp.
  - Polycoryne Skottsberg - 2 spp.
  - Schizoseris Kylin - 9 spp.
- Tribe Nitophylleae Willkomm (50)
  - Arachnophyllum Zanardini - 1 sp.
  - Augophyllum S.-M. Lin, S. Fredericq &M.H. Hommersand - 5 spp.
  - Nitophyllum Greville - 30 spp.
  - Nitospinosa Womersley - 3 spp.
  - Polyneurella E.Y.Dawson - 3 spp.
  - Polyneuropsis M.J.Wynne McBride & J.A.West - 1 sp.
  - Radicilingua Papenfuss - 5 spp.
  - Robea Womersley - 1 sp.
  - Valeriemaya A.J.K. Millar & M.J. Wynne
- Tribe Papenfussieae M.J.Wynne (1)
  - Papenfussia Kylin - 1 sp.

Subfamily Phycodryoideae Showe M.Lin, S.Fredericq, & M.H.Hommersand (190)

- Tribe Cryptopleureae M.J.Wynne (62)
  - Acrosorium Zanardini ex Kützing - 17 spp.
  - Botryoglossum Kützing - 2 spp.
  - Cryptopleura Kützing - 16 spp.
  - Gonimophyllum Batters - 4 spp.
  - Hymenena Greville - 23 spp.
- Tribe Myriogrammeae M.S.Hommersand & S.Fredericq (53)
  - Gonimocolax Kylin - 3 spp.
  - Haraldiophyllum A.D. Zinova - 5 spp.
  - Hideophyllum A.D. Zinova - 1 sp.
  - Myriogramme Kylin - 33 spp.
  - Neoharaldiophyllum J.C.Kang & M.S.Kim - 4 spp.
  - Phycoflabellina M.J.Wynne & C.W.Schneider - 1 sp.
  - Platyclinia J. Agardh - 6 spp.
- Tribe Phycodryeae M.J.Wynne (75)
  - Calloseris J. Agardh - 1 sp.
  - Cladodonta Skottsberg - 1 sp.
  - Crassilingua Papenfuss - 2 spp.
  - Erythroglossum J. Agardh - 14 spp.
  - Halicnide J. Agardh - 1 sp.
  - Haraldia Feldmann - 3 spp.
  - Heterodoxia J. Agardh - 1 sp.
  - Hymenopsis Showe M.Lin, W.A.Nelson & Hommersand - 1 sp.
  - Nienburgia Kylin - 5 spp.
  - Pseudopolyneura K.W.Nam & P.J.Kang - 3 spp.
  - Phycodrys Kützing - 30 spp.
  - Polyneura J. Agardh - 6 spp.
  - Sorella Hollenberg - 4 spp.
  - Sorellocolax Yoshida & Mikami - 1 sp.
  - Womersleya Papenfuss - 1 sp.
  - Yendonia Kylin - 1 sp.

Subfamily Sarcomenioideae De Toni (74)

- Tribe Apoglosseae Showe M.Lin, S.Fredericq & M.H.Hommersand (21)
  - Apoglossocolax Maggs & Hommersand - 1 sp.
  - Apoglossum J. Agardh - 6 spp.
  - Paraglossum J. Agardh - 13 spp.
  - Phrix J.G.Stewart - 1 sp.
- Tribe Caloglosseae M.J.Wynne (24)
  - Caloglossa J. Agardh - 22 spp.
  - Taenioma J. Agardh - 2 spp.
- Tribe Halydictyeae Díaz-Tapia & Maggs (4)
  - Halydictyon Zanardini - 4 spp.
- Tribe Sarcomenieae J.Agardh (25)
  - Cottoniella Børgesen - 8 spp.
  - Dotyella Womersley & Shepley - 2 spp.
  - Malaconema Womersley & Shepley - 2 spp.
  - Platysiphonia Børgesen - 10 spp.
  - Sarcomenia Sonder - 1 sp.
  - Sarcotrichia Womersley & Shepley - 2 spp.
- (Non-specific assigned tribe genera)
- Aglaophyllum Montagne - 1 sp.
- Anisocladella Skottsberg - 2 spp.
- Mikamiella Wynne - 3 spp.
- Scutarius Roussel - 1 sp.
- Tribe Dicroglosseae A.J.K.Millar & J.M.Huisman (1)
  - Dicroglossum A.J.K. Millar & Huisman - 1 sp.
