= Ceramiales =

Scientific classification
- Clade: Archaeplastida
- Division: Rhodophyta
- Class: Florideophyceae
- Subclass: Rhodymeniophycidae
- Order: Ceramiales

Order of algae

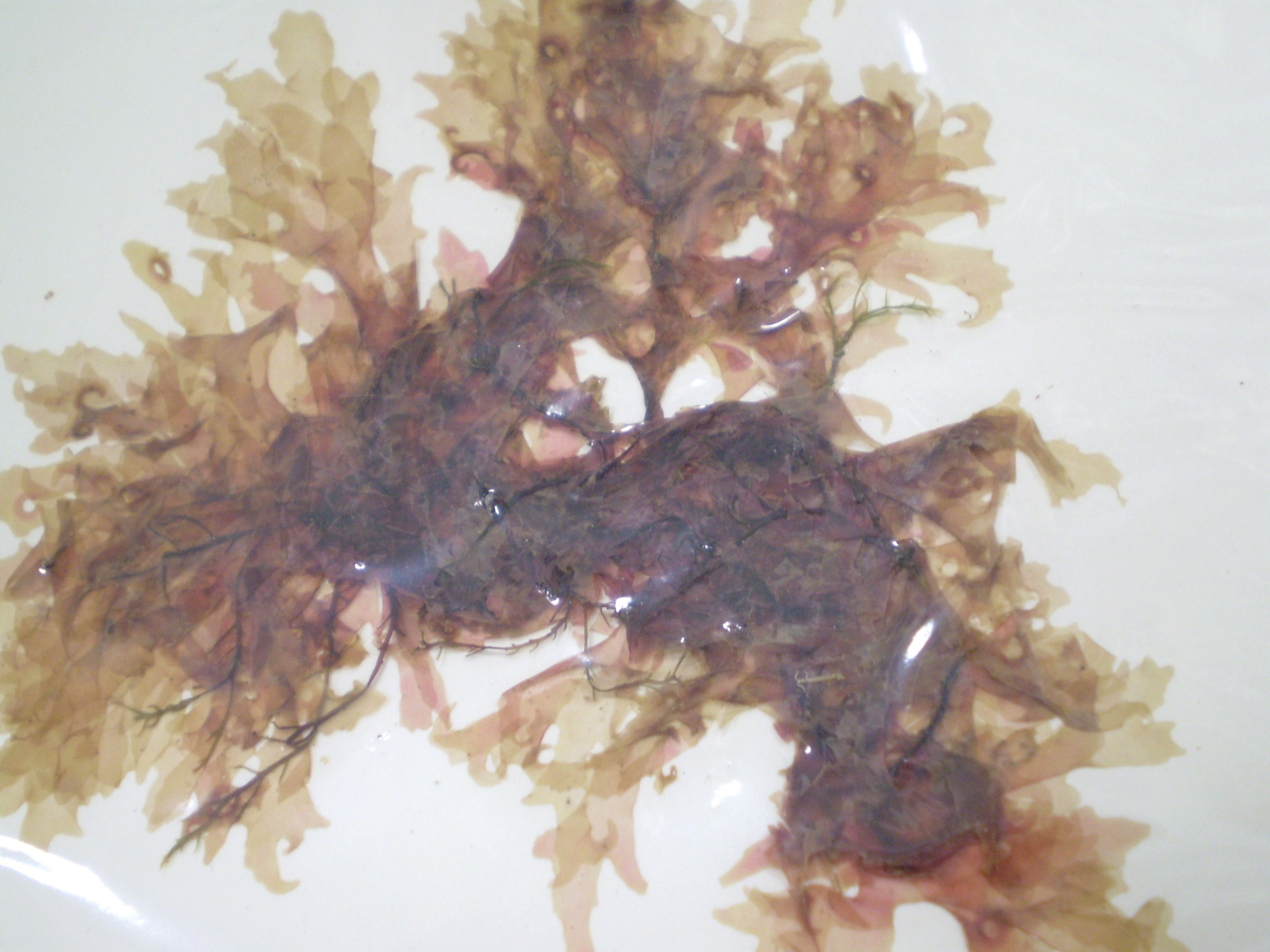
Acrosorium uncinatum

Ceramiales is an order of red algae. It was established by Friedrich Oltmanns in 1904.

== Families ==
- Callithamniaceae Kützing, 1843
- Ceramiaceae Dumortier, 1822
- Choreocolacaceae Sturch
- Dasyaceae Kützing, 1843
- Delesseriaceae Bory, 1828
- Inkyuleeaceae H.-G. Choi, Kraft, H.-S. Kim, Guiry et G.W. Saunders, 2008
- Rhodomelaceae J.E. Areschoug, 1847
- Sarcomeniaceae Womersley, 2003
- Spyridiaceae J. Agardh, 1851
- Wrangeliaceae J. Agardh, 1851
