= List of Ceramium species =

Ceramium is a genus of red algae in the Rhodophyta.

== Species ==
- Ceramium abyssale Petersen 1924
- Ceramium acanthonotum coronata Kleen
- Ceramium acanthonotum transcurrens Holmes & Batters
- Ceramium acanthonotum typica Kjellman
- Ceramium acrocarpum Kützing; Zanardini
- Ceramium adauctum Schousboe
- Ceramium adhaerens Womersley 2003
- Ceramium aduncum Nakamura 1950
- Ceramium affine originale Dawson
- Ceramium affine peninsularis E.Y.Dawson 1950
- Ceramium affine Setchell & N.L.Gardner, 1930
- Ceramium albidum De Candolle 1805
- Ceramium allochrous (Roth) Mertens
- Ceramium alternum Schousboe
- Ceramium amamiense Itono, 1972
- Ceramium annulatum Schousboe
- Ceramium apiculatum J. Agardh 1876
- Ceramium appendiculatum Schousboe
- Ceramium arachnoideum patentissimum Harvey
- Ceramium arborescens J. Agardh 1894
- Ceramium arbuscula (Dillwyn) Bokry
- Ceramium arbuscula C.Agardh
- Ceramium arcticum J. Agardh 1894
- Ceramium arenarium Simons 1966
- Ceramium areschougii Kylin, 1907
- Ceramium armatum (Kützing) Grunow
- Ceramium asparagoides (Woodw.) Roth
- Ceramium aspergillosum J.V.Lamouroux
- Ceramium asperum Roth
- Ceramium atlanticum H.E.Petersen, 1911
- Ceramium atlanticum norvegicum Petersen 1925
- Ceramium atrorubens Liljeblad
- Ceramium atrorubescens Kylin 1938
- Ceramium atrum Schousboe
- Ceramium attenuatum australe Harvey
- Ceramium attenuatum Meneghini; Ruchinger
- Ceramium aucklandicum Kützing 1849
- Ceramium aureum (Linnaeus) Agardh
- Ceramium australe Sonder, 1845
- Ceramium avalonae E.Y. Dawson, 1949
- Ceramium axillare A. P. de Candolle
- Ceramium barbatum (J.E.Smith) Duby, 1833
- Ceramium barbatum minor Schiffner
- Ceramium barbatum nanum Schiffner
- Ceramium barbatum typicum Schiffner
- Ceramium bertholdii Funk 1922
- Ceramium biasolettianum (Kützing) Rabenhorst
- Ceramium bicorne Setchell & Gardner, 1924
- Ceramium bisporum D.L.Ballantine, 1990
- Ceramium boergesenii H.E.Petersen, 1911
- Ceramium borneense Weber-van Bosse 1923
- Ceramium borreri (J.E.Smith) C.Agardh
- Ceramium borreri firmius C.Agardh
- Ceramium botryocarpum A. W. Griffiths ex Harvey 1848
- Ceramium boucheri (Bonnemaison) Duby
- Ceramium boucheri mucilaginosum P.L.Crouan & H.M.Crouan
- Ceramium boucheri tenuissimum P.L.Crouan & H.M.Crouan
- Ceramium boydenii E.S.Gepp, 1904
- Ceramium brasiliense A.B. Joly, 1957
- Ceramium breviarticulatum pellucidum Shperk
- Ceramium breviarticulatum Shperk
- Ceramium brevizonatum caraibicum H.E.Petersen & B¿rgesen 1924
- Ceramium brevizonatum H.E.Petersen, 1918
- Ceramium bulbosum Stackhouse
- Ceramium byssoideum alternatum D.L.Ballantine & Humm 1975
- Ceramium caespitosum maximum Roth
- Ceramium caespitosum Roth
- Ceramium californicum decipiens J.Agardh
- Ceramium californicum J. Agardh, 1894
- Ceramium callipterum Mazoyer, 1938
- Ceramium callithamnium Rafinesque
- Ceramium calyculatum Schousboe
- Ceramium camouii E.Y.Dawson, 1944
- Ceramium cancellatum (Linnaeus) De Candolle 1805
- Ceramium cancellatum proliferum Grunow
- Ceramium capense Kützing 1841
- Ceramium capillaceum Meneghini
- Ceramium capitellatum De Notaris
- Ceramium capricornu (Reinsch) Farlow
- Ceramium casuarinae De Candolle
- Ceramium catenatum (Linnaeus) De Candolle, 1805
- Ceramium catenula (Kützing) Ardissone
- Ceramium caudatum Setchell & N.L.Gardner, 1924
- Ceramium centroceratiforme Simons 1966
- Ceramium ceratophyllum (Roth) Poiret
- Ceramium chalybeum (Roth) C.Agardh
- Ceramium chatamense G.Feldmann
- Ceramium chathamense G. Feldmann 1950
- Ceramium ciliatum (J.Ellis) Ducluzeau, 1806
- Ceramium ciliatum armatissimum Schiffner
- Ceramium ciliatum diaphanum (Kützing) Schiffner
- Ceramium ciliatum echinatum Hauck
- Ceramium ciliatum julaceum Schiffner
- Ceramium ciliatum major Schiffner
- Ceramium ciliatum nanum Schiffner
- Ceramium ciliatum nudiusculum (Kützing) Schiffner
- Ceramium ciliatum polyspermum (Sperk.) Woronichin
- Ceramium ciliatum proliferum C.Agardh
- Ceramium ciliatum robustum (J. Agardh) Mazoyer
- Ceramium ciliatum secundatum (Kützing) Schiffner
- Ceramium ciliatum subjulaceum Schiffner
- Ceramium cimbricum flaccidum (H.E.Petersen) Furnari & Serio 1996
- Ceramium cimbricum H. E. Petersen 1924
- Ceramium cingulatum Weber-van Bosse 1923
- Ceramium cingulum Meneses 1995
- Ceramium circinatum (Kützing) J.Agardh 1851
- Ceramium circinatum boreale Foslie
- Ceramium circinatum confluens (Kützing) Ardissone 1883
- Ceramium circinatum decipiens Schiffner
- Ceramium circinatum divaricatum Foslie
- Ceramium circinatum duriusculum (Kützing) Ardissone
- Ceramium circinatum genuinum Foslie
- Ceramium circinatum infernecorticatum Lakowitz
- Ceramium circinatum rigidum Foslie
- Ceramium circinatum syntrophum Kützing
- Ceramium circinatum tenue Foslie
- Ceramium circinatum transcurrens (Kützing) Schiffner
- Ceramium cirrhosum (Wulf.) C.Agardh
- Ceramium clarionense Setchell & N.L. Gardner, 1930
- Ceramium clavaeforme Poiret
- Ceramium clavellosum (Turner) Roth
- Ceramium clavigerum Bonnemaison
- Ceramium clavulatum crispulum Montagne
- Ceramium clavulatum inerme (Kützing) Weber-van Bosse; Kützing
- Ceramium cliftonianum J. Agardh 1876
- Ceramium coccineum (Ellis) De Candolle; (Hudson) Bory; Draparnaud; Roth ex Link 1806; Zanardini
- Ceramium codicola J. Agardh, 1894
- Ceramium codii (H.Richards) Mazoyer, 1938
- Ceramium comptum B¿rgesen 1924
- Ceramium confluens (Kützing) Ardissone
- Ceramium congestum Bonnemaison
- Ceramium connivens Zanardini
- Ceramium contortum longinum (G. Karsten) Sournia 1966
- Ceramium corallinum (J.Murray) Bory; Delle Chiaje
- Ceramium cormacii Serio, Catra, Collodoro & Nisi, 2011
- Ceramium corniculatum Montagne 1861
- Ceramium cornutum P.Dangeard, 1952
- Ceramium corymbosum (E.B.) C.Agardh; J.Agardh
- Ceramium cristatum Meneghini
- Ceramium crouanianum J.Agardh, 1894
- Ceramium cruciatum F.S. Collins & Hervey, 1917
- Ceramium cupulatum Womersley, 1978
- Ceramium dalmaticum Meneghini
- Ceramium danicum Petersen 1924
- Ceramium dasytrichum Montagne
- Ceramium daviesii (Dillwyn) Bonnemaison; (Dillwyn) C.Agardh
- Ceramium daviesii secundatum (Lyngbye) Duby
- Ceramium dawsonii A. B. Joly 1957
- Ceramium decurrens majus Kützing Harvey
- Ceramium derbesii Solier ex Kützing 1847
- Ceramium deslongchampsii Chauvin ex Duby 1830
- Ceramium deslongchampsii hooperi (Harvey) W.R.Taylor
- Ceramium deslongchampsii semiascendens J.Luca
- Ceramium deslongchampsii viminarium Melv.ex G.Murray
- Ceramium diaphanoides Kützing
- Ceramium diaphanum (Lightfoot) Roth, 1806
- Ceramium diaphanum arachnoides C.Agardh
- Ceramium diaphanum aucklandicum J.D.Hooker & Harvey
- Ceramium diaphanum capense Simons
- Ceramium diaphanum capricornu (Reinsch) Foslie 1893
- Ceramium diaphanum corticatulostrictum Kylin
- Ceramium diaphanum corticatulum H.E.Petersen
- Ceramium diaphanum decipiens Schiffner
- Ceramium diaphanum elegans (Roth) Roth 1806
- Ceramium diaphanum fastigiatum (Roth) Trevisan
- Ceramium diaphanum gracile Ardissone
- Ceramium diaphanum herbaceum (Roth) Roth
- Ceramium diaphanum indicum Feldmann-Mazoyer 1952
- Ceramium diaphanum minor P.L.Crouan & H.M.Crouan 1865
- Ceramium diaphanum patentissima Foslie
- Ceramium diaphanum pilosum (Roth) C.Agardh
- Ceramium diaphanum pulcher Shperk
- Ceramium diaphanum radiculosum (Grunow) H.E.Petersen
- Ceramium diaphanum rigidum A.W.Griffiths & Harvey
- Ceramium diaphanum serpens Montagne
- Ceramium diaphanum strictotenuissimum (H.E.Petersen) Kylin
- Ceramium diaphanum strictum Celan & Serbanescu 1969
- Ceramium diaphanum typicum H.E.Petersen
- Ceramium diaphanum virescens Lyngbye
- Ceramium diaphanum zostericola acrocarpum (Kützing) Feldmann-Mazoyer 1941
- Ceramium diaphanum zostericola H.E.Petersen
- Ceramium dichotomum (Linnaeus) Roth
- Ceramium didymum Bonnemaison
- Ceramium diffusum (Hudson) Stackhouse
- Ceramium digeneae DeNotaris
- Ceramium digitatum (Hudson) Stackh.
- Ceramium dillwynii (Weber & Mohr) Roth
- Ceramium discorticatum Heydrich 1893
- Ceramium divergens J.Agardh 1894
- Ceramium dorsiventrale Hommersand, 1963
- Ceramium dozei Hariot 1887
- Ceramium ducluzeaui Bonnemaison
- Ceramium ducluzeaui miniatum Bonnemaison
- Ceramium ducluzeaui versicolor Bonnemaison
- Ceramium dumosertum R. E. Norris & Abbott 1992
- Ceramium dumosum Mertens
- Ceramium duriusculum (Kützing) Rabenhorst
- Ceramium echinophorum Meneghini
- Ceramium echionotum J. Agardh, 1844
- Ceramium echionotum azoricum (Meneghini) Piccone 1884
- Ceramium echionotum mediterraneum Mazoyer 1938
- Ceramium echionotum transcurrens (Kützing) Piccone
- Ceramium edule Stackhouse
- Ceramium elegans litorale Celan & Serbanescu 1959
- Ceramium elegans longe-articulata Celan & Serbanescu 1959
- Ceramium elegans nanum Schiffner
- Ceramium elegans tenerior Schiffner
- Ceramium elongatum (Hudson) Roth 1806
- Ceramium elongatum denudata (C.Agardh) Duby
- Ceramium equisetifolium (Lightf.) De Candolle
- Ceramium equisetoides E.Y. Dawson, 1944
- Ceramium erumpens Meneghini
- Ceramium evermannii Setchell & N.L. Gardner, 1930
- Ceramium excellens J. Agardh, 1894
- Ceramium fastigiatum Roussel 1806
- Ceramium fastigiatum pubescens (Kützing) Piccone
- Ceramium fastigiramosum S.M.Boo & I.K.Lee, 1985
- Ceramium felicii Gaillon
- Ceramium ferrugineum compactius C.Agardh
- Ceramium fibrillosum (Dillwyn) Mertens
- Ceramium fibrosum Roth
- Ceramium filamentosum continuum C.Agardh
- Ceramium filamentosum friabile P.L.Crouan & H.M.Crouan 1867
- Ceramium filiculum Harvey ex Womersley, 1978
- Ceramium flabelligerum Agardh F.Debray
- Ceramium flagellare (Esper) Ruchinger
- Ceramium flagelliferum Kützing
- Ceramium flavicans Schousboe
- Ceramium flavum Schousboe
- Ceramium floccosum (Fl.Dan.) Roth
- Ceramium floribundum Kützing
- Ceramium floridanum J. Agardh, 1894
- Ceramium forcipatum A.P.de Candolle, 1805
- Ceramium forcipatum ciliatum (Ellis) A. P. de Candolle
- Ceramium forcipatum glabellum A.P.de Candolle 1805
- Ceramium fosliei (Petersen) Petersen 1935
- Ceramium fractum elongatim (Roth) Bory
- Ceramium fragile Ardissone
- Ceramium friabile Schousboe
- Ceramium fructiculosum (Wulfen) Stackhouse; Roth, 1981
- Ceramium fruticulosum rubroides Petersen 1908
- Ceramium fucoides (Hudson) De Candolle
- Ceramium fujiianum M.B.Barros-Barreto & C. A. Maggs, 2006
- Ceramium furcatum (Petersen) Petersen 1925
- Ceramium furcellatum (Linnaeus) Wiggers; Kützing
- Ceramium fuscum (Hudson) Roth
- Ceramium gaditanum (Clemente) Cremades, J. (F.Debray) Cremades 1990
- Ceramium gaditanum mediterraneum (Debray) Cremades 1990
- Ceramium gardneri Kylin, 1941
- Ceramium gelatinosum Schousboe
- Ceramium giacconei Cormaci & G. Furnari 1991
- Ceramium gibbosum Meneghini
- Ceramium giganteum Meneghini
- Ceramium gigartinum (Linnaeus) Roth
- Ceramium glanduliferum Kylin 1938
- Ceramium glomeratum De Candolle
- Ceramium gracile De Candolle 1805
- Ceramium gracilliferum Griffiths & Harvey
- Ceramium gracillimum C.Agardh 1824
- Ceramium gracillimum byssoideum (Harvey) Mazoyer
- Ceramium graecum Lazaridou & Boudouresque 1992
- Ceramium granulosum (E.B.) C.Agardh
- Ceramium grateloupii Bonnemaison; Duby
- Ceramium griffitsianum (E.B.) J.Agardh
- Ceramium guttatum Bonnemaison, 1828
- Ceramium gymnogonium Meneghini
- Ceramium hamatispinum E.Y. Dawson, 1950
- Ceramium hellenicum Giaccone
- Ceramium helminthochortos (Schwendimann) Roth
- Ceramium heterospinum B. Subramanian, 1985
- Ceramium hirsutum Roth
- Ceramium hispidum Schousboe
- Ceramium hoodii W.R. Taylor, 1945
- Ceramium hookeri (Dillwyn) C.Agardh
- Ceramium horridulum P.C.Silva, 1972
- Ceramium horridum Meneghini 1844
- Ceramium hospitans Zanardini
- Ceramium howellii Setchell & N.L. Gardner, 1937
- Ceramium hyalinum Rabenhorst
- Ceramium hystrix (Kützing) Frauenfeld
- Ceramium implexum Schousboe
- Ceramium inconspicuum Zanardini, 1840
- Ceramium inflexum Roth
- Ceramium inkyui T.O.Cho, S.Fredericq, & S.M.Boo, 2003
- Ceramium interruptum Setchell & Gardner, 1924
- Ceramium interruptum nigrescens C.Agardh 1824
- Ceramium involutum Kützing 1849
- Ceramium irregulare Kützing 1849
- Ceramium isogonum Harvey 1855
- Ceramium japonicum Okamura, 1896
- Ceramium johnstonii Setchell & Gardner, 1924
- Ceramium jolyi (Daz-Piferrer) D.L.Ballantine & M.J.Wynne 1968
- Ceramium julaceum (Kützing) Rabenhorst 1847
- Ceramium juliae A.J.K. Millar, 2002
- Ceramium kellneri Meneghini
- Ceramium kondoi Yendo 1920
- Ceramium kondoi abbreviatum Nakamura 1950
- Ceramium kondoi ambiguum Nakamura 1950
- Ceramium kondoi trichotomum Nakamura 1950
- Ceramium kondoi typicum Nakamura
- Ceramium koreanum Boo & I.K.Lee, 1986
- Ceramium koronense Trono, 1972
- Ceramium krameri G.R.South & Skelton, 2000
- Ceramium laingii Reinbold ex Laing 1905
- Ceramium lamourouxii Bonnemaison
- Ceramium lamourouxii Duby
- Ceramium laterale Schousboe
- Ceramium ledermannii Pilger, 1911
- Ceramium lenormandii Montague
- Ceramium lenticulare Womersley 1978
- Ceramium lentiforme A. J. K. Millar 1990
- Ceramium leptacanthum (Kützing) Zanardini
- Ceramium leptocladum Schiffner 1933
- Ceramium leptophloeum Kützing
- Ceramium leptosiphon Pilger, 1920
- Ceramium leptozonum M.A. Howe, 1918
- Ceramium lessonii Kützing
- Ceramium leutzelburgii australis A.B.Joly 1965
- Ceramium leutzelburgii Schmidt, 1924
- Ceramium linum (Roth) De Candolle
- Ceramium lobatum (Kützing) Shperk
- Ceramium longissimum (S. G. Gmelin) Roth
- Ceramium longissimum flagellare (Esper) Roth
- Ceramium loureiri C. Agardh 1824
- Ceramium loureiroi^{[duplicate?]} C.Agardh
- Ceramium lucidum Grateloup
- Ceramium luetzelburgii australe A.B.Joly 1965
- Ceramium luetzelburgii O. C. Schmidt 1924
- Ceramium lumbricale (Roth) Lamouroux
- Ceramium macilentum J.Agardh, 1894
- Ceramium macrocarpum Kützing
- Ceramium macrogonium (Kützing) Ardissone
- Ceramium macrotrichum Feldmann-Mazoyer, 1952
- Ceramium manorense P. Anand, 1943
- Ceramium marshallense E. Y. Dawson 1957
- Ceramium maryae tenuior Weber- Van Bosse
- Ceramium maryae Weber-van Bosse 1923
- Ceramium mauritianum Feldmann-Mazoyer, 1952
- Ceramium mertensii (Turner) De Candolle; (Turner) Roth
- Ceramium metcalfii C. K. Tseng
- Ceramium microcarpon Schousboe
- Ceramium molle Roth
- Ceramium monacanthum J.Agardh, 1894
- Ceramium monile crassior J.Agardh
- Ceramium multicapsulare (Dillwyn) C.Agardh
- Ceramium multijugum Jaasund, 1970
- Ceramium myriophyllum Poiret
- Ceramium nakamurae E.Y.Dawson 1954
- Ceramium nanum Kuehne 1946
- Ceramium nayalii Nasr, 1941
- Ceramium nitens (C. Agardh) J. Agardh 1851
- Ceramium nodiferum moniliforme Shperk
- Ceramium nodulosum De Candolle; Ducluzeau 1850
- Ceramium nodulosum continuum Ruprecht
- Ceramium nodulosum implexo-contortum Solier
- Ceramium nodulosum minus Ruprecht
- Ceramium nodulosum tenue (C. Agardh) Serio
- Ceramium nudiusculum (Kützing) Rabenhorst 1847
- Ceramium obesum E.Y. Dawson, 1950
- Ceramium obsoletum C. Agardh 1828
- Ceramium opacum Rafinesque
- Ceramium oppositum Schousboe
- Ceramium opuntia Schousboe
- Ceramium ornatum Setchell & Gardner, 1930
- Ceramium orsinianum Meneghini
- Ceramium orthocladum maximum Schiffner 1938
- Ceramium orthocladum nanum Schiffner 1938
- Ceramium orthocladum Schiffner 1926
- Ceramium pacificum (Collins) Kylin, 1925
- Ceramium pallens Zanardini
- Ceramium pallidum (Ngeli ex Kützing) Maggs & Hommersand 1993
- Ceramium paniculatum Okamura 1921
- Ceramium papenfussianum Simons 1966
- Ceramium parvulum (Zanardini ex Frauenfeld) Grunow, 1867
- Ceramium pedicellatum (Duby) J. Agardh, C. Agardh, 1817
- Ceramium pedicellatum minus Desmaziâres
- Ceramium pediculum Suhr
- Ceramium penicillatum Areschoug 1849
- Ceramium pennatum P.L.Crouan & H.M.Crouan, 1852
- Ceramium periconicum T.O.Cho & Riosmena-Rodrguez 2008
- Ceramium personatum Setchell & N.L. Gardner, 1930
- Ceramium petitii Feldmann-Mazoyer
- Ceramium pictaviense Del?tre
- Ceramium piliferum Schousboe
- Ceramium pilosum (Roth) Naccari
- Ceramium pinastroides (Gmelin) Stackhouse
- Ceramium pinnulatum C .Agardh
- Ceramium planum Kützing 1849
- Ceramium pleurosporum Schiffner 1938
- Ceramium pleurosporum nanum Schiffner prov.
- Ceramium plicatum (Hudson) Roth; Meneghini
- Ceramium plocamium (Gmelin) Roth
- Ceramium pluma (Dillwyn) C.Agardh
- Ceramium plumula subverticillatum Bonnemaison
- Ceramium pluvinatum Mertens
- Ceramium poeppigianum Grunow 1868 '1867'
- Ceramium poeppigianum unilaterale Hommersand 1963
- Ceramium polyceras (Kützing) Zanardini 1847
- Ceramium polygonum (Kützing) Shperk
- Ceramium polyspermum P.L.Crouan & H.M.Crouan; Shperk
- Ceramium procumbens Setchell & N.L. Gardner, 1924
- Ceramium proliferum (Lyngbye) H.E.Petersen; Yates
- Ceramium proliferum secundatum (Lyngbye) H.E.Petersen
- Ceramium prorepens Grunow
- Ceramium prostratum E.Y. Dawson, 1963
- Ceramium pseudostrictum Schiffner 1938
- Ceramium pseudostrictum major Schiffner
- Ceramium pseudostrictum minor Schiffner
- Ceramium pseudostrictum nanum Schiffner
- Ceramium pteroma Schousboe
- Ceramium puberulum Sonder 1845
- Ceramium pulchellum chalybeum (Roth) C.Agardh
- Ceramium pulvereum (Dillwyn) C.Agardh
- Ceramium punctiforme Setchell 1924
- Ceramium purpurascens Wallroth
- Ceramium purpureum Delle Chiaje
- Ceramium purum Roth
- Ceramium pusillum Harvey 1863
- Ceramium pusillum lanceolatum J.Agardh
- Ceramium pyramidatum Schousboe
- Ceramium pyridioides G.Feldmann
- Ceramium racemosum Schousboe
- Ceramium radiculosum major Schiffner
- Ceramium radiculosum venetum Schiffner
- Ceramium ramulosum nanum Schiffner
- Ceramium recticorticum E.Y. Dawson, 1950
- Ceramium repens saxatile Bonnemaison
- Ceramium repens spinosissimum Zanardini
- Ceramium reptans T.O.Cho & Fredericq, 2006
- Ceramium rescissum Kylin 1907
- Ceramium rhizophorum (Montagne) De Toni
- Ceramium rigidum Ardissone
- Ceramium rintelsianum G.R.South & Skelton, 2000
- Ceramium riosmenae B.Y.Won & T.O.Cho, 2011
- Ceramium rosenvingei^{[duplicate?]} Petersen 1908
- Ceramium rosenvingii H.E.Petersen
- Ceramium rosenvingii intermedium H.E.Petersen
- Ceramium rosenvingii tenue H.E.Petersen
- Ceramium rosenvingii transgrediens H.E.Petersen
- Ceramium roseum majus Roth
- Ceramium roseum viscidulum Bonnemaison
- Ceramium rubrum ambiguum Schiffner
- Ceramium rubrum barbatum (Ardissone) Hauck; G.Feldmann-Mazoyer 1941
- Ceramium rubrum botryoides Montagne 1841
- Ceramium rubrum corymbiferum (Bonnemaison) J.Agardh 1851, 1876; Hariot
- Ceramium rubrum decurrens (Kützing) J.Agardh
- Ceramium rubrum diaphanum Gobi
- Ceramium rubrum diaphanum P.L.Crouan & H.M.Crouan
- Ceramium rubrum divaricatum C.Agardh
- Ceramium rubrum fasciculatum J. Agardh; Wollny
- Ceramium rubrum firmum C.Agardh
- Ceramium rubrum genuinum Kjellman
- Ceramium rubrum implexo-contortum^{[duplicate?]} (Solier) Feldmann-Mazoyer
- Ceramium rubrum implexocontortum Solier
- Ceramium rubrum irregulare H.E.Petersen
- Ceramium rubrum lineare H.E.Petersen
- Ceramium rubrum lineatum H.E.Petersen
- Ceramium rubrum maculatum S.F.Gray
- Ceramium rubrum major C.Agardh
- Ceramium rubrum membranaceum C.Agardh
- Ceramium rubrum nodulosum Montagne
- Ceramium rubrum pedicellatum (De Candolle) Duby; J. Agardh
- Ceramium rubrum pedicellatum Shperk
- Ceramium rubrum proliferum (Lyngbye) J.Agardh; Hariot 1889
- Ceramium rubrum ramellosum Ardissone
- Ceramium rubrum repens (Zanardini) Zanardini
- Ceramium rubrum secundatum (Lyngbye) C.Agardh; H.E.Petersen; Harvey; J.Agardh; Kützing; H. E. Petersen
- Ceramium rubrum subcorticatum H.E.Petersen
- Ceramium rubrum tenue (C.Agardh) Ardissone 1824; Kützing
- Ceramium rubrum typicum H.E.Petersen; Reinke
- Ceramium rubrum virgatum C.Agardh 1824
- Ceramium rugosum J.V.Lamouroux
- Ceramium rupestre tenuissimum J.V.Lamouroux
- Ceramium sandrianum Meneghini
- Ceramium saviniae Feldmann-Mazoyer, 1952
- Ceramium scandinavicum Petersen 1924
- Ceramium scoparium (Linnaeus) Roth
- Ceramium scorpioides (Hudson) Roth
- Ceramium secundatum Lyngbye, 1819
- Ceramium septentrionale Petersen 1911
- Ceramium serpens Setchell & N.L.Gardner, 1924
- Ceramium setaceum (Hudson) Duby; Wallroth; Ruchinger
- Ceramium setchellii Lucas, 1935
- Ceramium setosum Schousboe
- Ceramium shepherdii Womersley, 1978
- Ceramium shuttleworthianum (Kützing) Rabenhorst 1847
- Ceramium siliquosum (Kützing) Maggs & Hommersand 1993
- Ceramium siliquosum acrocarpum (G.Mazoyer) G.Furnari 1999
- Ceramium siliquosum elegans (Roth) G. Furnari 1999
- Ceramium siliquosum lophophorum (Feldman-Mazoyer) Serio
- Ceramium siliquosum minusculum (G.Mazoyer) Garreta et al. 2001
- Ceramium siliquosum zostericola (Thuret) G.Furnari 1999
- Ceramium simplex C.Agardh
- Ceramium sinicola interruptum (Setch.& Gard.) Daws. 1944
- Ceramium sinicola johnstonii (Setchell & N.L.Gardner) Dawson 1944
- Ceramium sinicola Setchell & Gardner, 1924
- Ceramium skottsbergii H. Petersen 1924
- Ceramium spicatum Schousboe
- Ceramium spiniferum Kützing
- Ceramium spinosopilosum Kützing 1863
- Ceramium spinosum (Linnaeus) Ruchinger
- Ceramium spinulosum (Kützing) Rabenhorst; Biasoletto
- Ceramium spyridioides G. Feldmann 1950
- Ceramium squamosum Rafinesque
- Ceramium squarrosum (Harvey) J.Agardh
- Ceramium stichidiosum J. Agardh, 1876
- Ceramium stichidiosum scopulorum Laing 1909
- Ceramium stichidiosum smithii Laing 1909
- Ceramium strictum acrocarpum Kützing
- Ceramium strictum breviarticulatum Ardissone
- Ceramium strictum corticatulostrictum (Kylin) Sjstedt
- Ceramium strictum delicatum J. Agardh
- Ceramium strictum divaricatum Holmes & Batters
- Ceramium strictum minusculum Mazoyer
- Ceramium strictum nanum Schiffner
- Ceramium strictum proliferum F.S.Collins
- Ceramium strictum strictotenuissimum H.E.Petersen
- Ceramium strictum strictum J.Agardh
- Ceramium strictum vertebrale (H.E.Petersen) H.E.Petersen
- Ceramium strobiliforme G.W.Lawson & D.M.John, 1982
- Ceramium subcartilagineum J.Agardh
- Ceramium subfuscum (Woodw.) Stackhouse
- Ceramium subsimplex Schousboe
- Ceramium subtile J. Agardh, 1851
- Ceramium subverticillatum (Grunow) Weber-van Bosse, 1923
- Ceramium subvirgatum Zanardini 1854
- Ceramium suhrianum P.C. Silva, 1996
- Ceramium syntrophum (Kützing) Ardissone
- Ceramium tasmanicum (Kützing) Womersley 1978
- Ceramium templetonii Setchell & N.L.Gardner, 1937
- Ceramium tenellum (Vahl) C.Agardh
- Ceramium tenerrimum (G.Martens) Okamura, 1921
- Ceramium tenerrimum brevizonatum (H. E. Petersen) Feldmann-Mazoyer
- Ceramium tenue (J.Agardh) J.Agardh, 1894
- Ceramium tenuicorne (Kützing) Waern 1952
- Ceramium tenuicorticatum Konno, 1974
- Ceramium tenuissimum divaricatum (P. L. Crouan & H. M. Crouan ex J. Agardh) Foslie 1893
- Ceramium tenuissimum J. Agardh
- Ceramium tenuissimum moniliforme (Sperk.) Woronichin
- Ceramium tenuissimum pygmaeum (Kützing) Hauck 1888
- Ceramium tenuissimum uniforme Bonnemaison
- Ceramium tetricum pectinatum C. Agardh
- Ceramium thymifolium Schousboe
- Ceramium tortuosum Ducluzeau
- Ceramium torulosum Roth
- Ceramium tranquebariense Roth
- Ceramium tranquillum Meneses 1998
- Ceramium transcurrens (Kützing) Ardissone
- Ceramium transfugum (Kützing) Ardissone
- Ceramium trichocladis C.Agardh
- Ceramium truncatum H.Petersen, 1936
- Ceramium tubulosum Roth
- Ceramium tumidulum Meneghini
- Ceramium turneri radicans Bonnemaison
- Ceramium uncinatum Harvey 1855
- Ceramium ungulatum (Kützing) Hariot 1889
- Ceramium uniforme (Esper) Ruchinger; Meneghini
- Ceramium unilaterale Schousboe
- Ceramium upolense G.R.South & Skelton, 2000
- Ceramium urceolatum (Dillwyn) Jrgens
- Ceramium uruguayense W.R. Taylor, 1960
- Ceramium vagans P. C. Silva 1987
- Ceramium variegatum (Kützing) Okamura 1932
- Ceramium vatovai Schiffner, 1938
- Ceramium venetum Zanardini
- Ceramium verrucosum Roth
- Ceramium vertebrale H.E.Petersen
- Ceramium verticillatum (Light.) Ducluzeau, (Lightf.) De Candolle; Delle Chiaje
- Ceramium vestitum Harvey, 1855
- Ceramium vietnamense Pham-Hong H 1969
- Ceramium villosum (Hudson) Poiret
- Ceramium violaceum tenuius Roth
- Ceramium virgatum J.D. Hooker & Harvey, 1848; Roth, 1797
- Ceramium viride Filarszky
- Ceramium viscainoense E.Y. Dawson, 1950
- Ceramium wilsonii Womersley 2003
- Ceramium womersleyi R. E. Norris & I. A. Abbott 1992
- Ceramium wulfenii Roth
- Ceramium zacae Setchell & N.L. Gardner, 1937

== Synonymy ==
- Ceramium elegans (Roth) Ducluzeau 1805 is a synonym of Ceramium diaphanum var. elegans (Roth) Roth
- Ceramium elegans var. diaphanoideum Celan & Serbanescu is a synonym of Ceramium siliquosum (Kützing) Maggs & Hommersand
- Ceramium elegans var. fastigiatum Celan & Serbanescu 1959 is a synonym of Ceramium cimbricum H.E.Petersen
- Ceramium elegans f. longiarticulata Celan & Serbanescu is a synonym of Ceramium siliquosum (Kützing) Maggs & Hommersand
