= Amelia Griffiths =

British phycologist (1768–1858)

Amelia Warren Griffiths
- Born: Amelia Warren Rogers; January 14, 1768; Pilton, Devon, UK
- Died: January 4, 1858 (aged 89); Torquay, Devon, UK
- Known for: Phycologist; collection and description of seaweed (marine algae)
- Spouse: William Griffiths
- Children: 5
- Scientific career
- Author abbrev. (botany): A.W.Griffiths

Amelia Griffiths (1768–1858), often referred to in contemporary works as Mrs Griffiths of Torquay, was a beachcomber and amateur phycologist who made many important collections of marine algae specimens.

== Personal life ==
Amelia Warren Rogers was born 14 January 1768 in Pilton, Devon, UK. Her parents were John and Emily (née Warren) Rogers. She married Rev. William Griffiths, the vicar of St Issey, Cornwall, in 1794, but after his death, she moved her family of five children to Torquay. She died in Torquay on 4 January 1858.

== Collaboration and dedications ==
She corresponded with the botanist William Henry Harvey for many years, becoming a close friend. They met at Torquay in 1839.

Harvey dedicated his 1849 Manual of British Algae to her, and once wrote

"If I lean to glorify any one, it is Mrs Griffiths, to whom I owe much of the little acquaintance I have with the variations to which these plants are subject, and who is always ready to supply me with fruits of plants which every one else finds barren. She is worth ten thousand other collectors."

Carl Adolph Agardh named Griffithsia in her honour in 1817.

One of her servants, Mary Wyatt, became involved in collecting and selling books of seaweeds as part of her business selling collectables and local souvenirs with assistance from Griffiths.

== Described species ==
Griffiths was the first to describe Ceramium agardhianum A.W.Griffiths ex Harvey 1841 (now C. deslongchampsii) and the species Ceramium botryocarpum in 1844.

The standard author abbreviation A.W.Griffiths is used to indicate this person as the author when citing a botanical name.

== Collections ==
She collected a large number of specimens. Some were sent to other collectors or scientists while she mounted others in albums herself. After her death, her own herbarium became part of Torquay Museum and there are 3 albums of her specimens in Exeter's Royal Albert Memorial Museum. Others became part of the collections in the British Museum, including 780 British seaweeds purchased in 1852 and 880 specimens presented by the North Devon Athenaeum in 1917. She had also provided material to other collectors and these have also found their way into national collections.

In 1862 a significant collection of her specimens were presented to the Kew Herbarium by Miss Burdett-Coutts. At the request of Joseph Dalton Hooker, this collection was curated by phycologist Maria Emma Gray with Gray selected appropriate specimens to represent Griffiths types for algae species. In recognition for this work Gray received numerous duplicate specimens from the Griffiths collection which she arranged into sets for presentation to scientific and educational institutions. One such set is held by the Linnean Society.

Griffiths daughter, Amelia Elizabeth Griffiths (1802–1861), also collected seaweeds and some of her collections have been mistaken for those of her mother.

== See also ==
- Timeline of women in science
