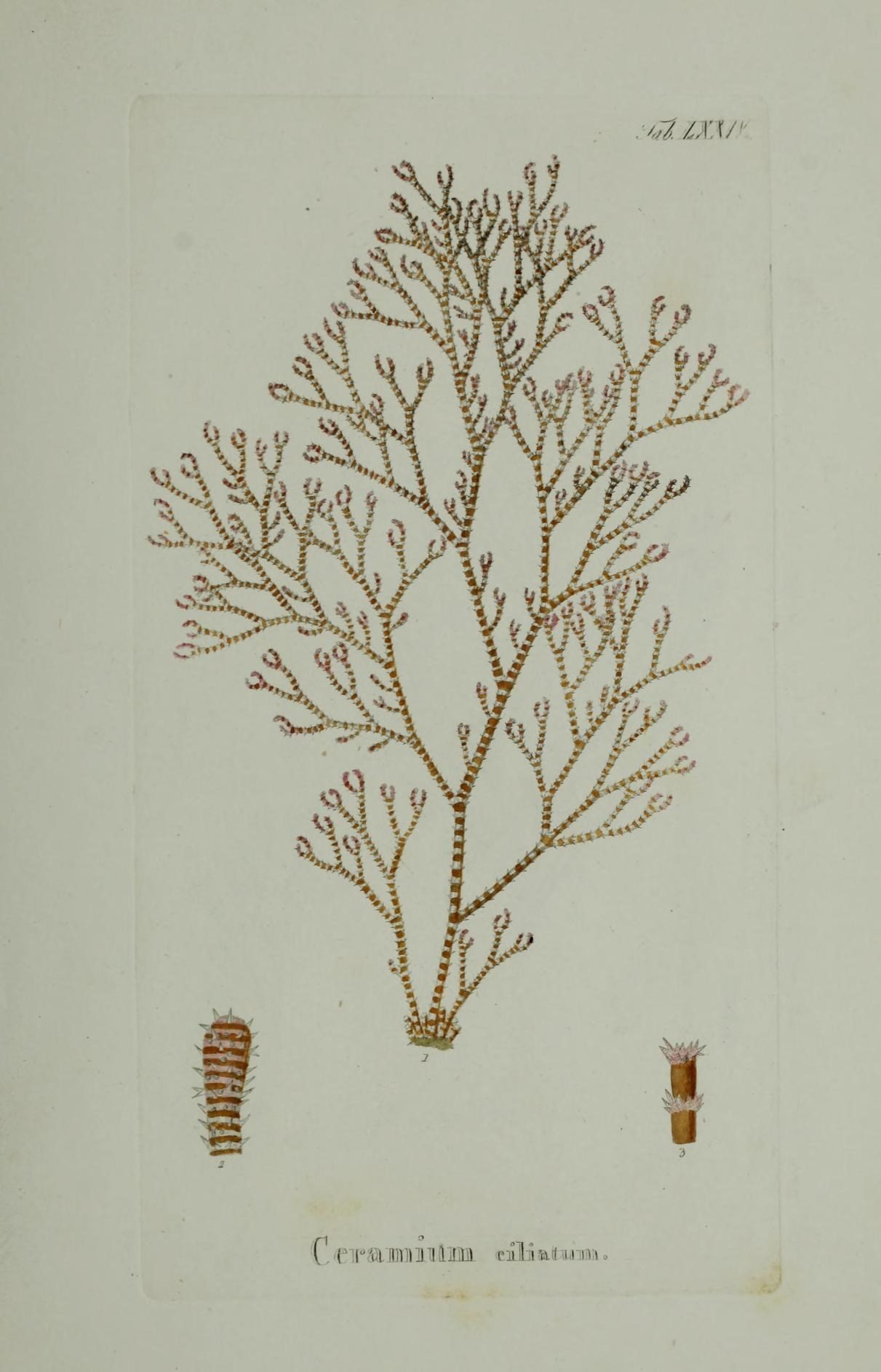

Scientific classification
- Clade: Archaeplastida
- Division: Rhodophyta
- Class: Florideophyceae
- Order: Ceramiales
- Family: Ceramiaceae
- Genus: Ceramium
- Species: C. ciliatum

Binomial name
- Ceramium ciliatum (Ellis) Ducluzeau

= Ceramium ciliatum =

Species of alga

Ceramium ciliatum is a small marine red alga in the Division Rhodophyta.

== Description ==
Ceramium ciliatum is a small branched alga. It is basically monosiphonous and composed of large cylindrical cells. Small periaxial cells are formed at the nodes, these produce cortical filaments which form bands around the central cells. The tips of the branches are strongly inrolled. Spines of three cells occur clearly delimited from the cortical bands. The three celled spines clearly help to distinguish this species from others. In the British Isles only Ceramium shuttleworthianum, Ceramium echionotum and Ceramium gaditanum show spines. Rhizoids occur branching from the lowermost cells.

== Habitat ==
Growing on rock, shells and other algae to a depth of 26 m.

== Distribution ==
To be found around Ireland, Britain, The Isle of Man, Norway and France and Mediterranean.
