= Ceramium secundatum =

Scientific classification
- Domain: Eukaryota
- Clade: Archaeplastida
- Division: Rhodophyta
- Class: Florideophyceae
- Order: Ceramiales
- Family: Ceramiaceae
- Genus: Ceramium
- Species: C. secundatum

Binomial name
- Ceramium secundatum Lyngbye

Species of alga

Ceramium secundatum is a small marine red alga.

== Description ==
This species is cylindrical and fundamentally monosiphonous. It appears as tufts of erect axes to 14 cm long, densely branched attached by multicellular rhizoids. The main axes has strongly in-rolled apices. Although completely corticated it may appear banded when young. It does not show spines. The cortical cells develop from the nodes between the axial cells. Adventitious branches are abundant.

== Reproduction ==
The species is dioecious. Tetraspores occur in whorls on the young axes. Found epiphytic on other algae and on artificial material in the sublittoral to 11m deep.

== Distribution ==
Recorded from the Great Britain and Ireland.

== Habitat ==
Common in the littoral, and epiphytic on other algae and artificial material.
