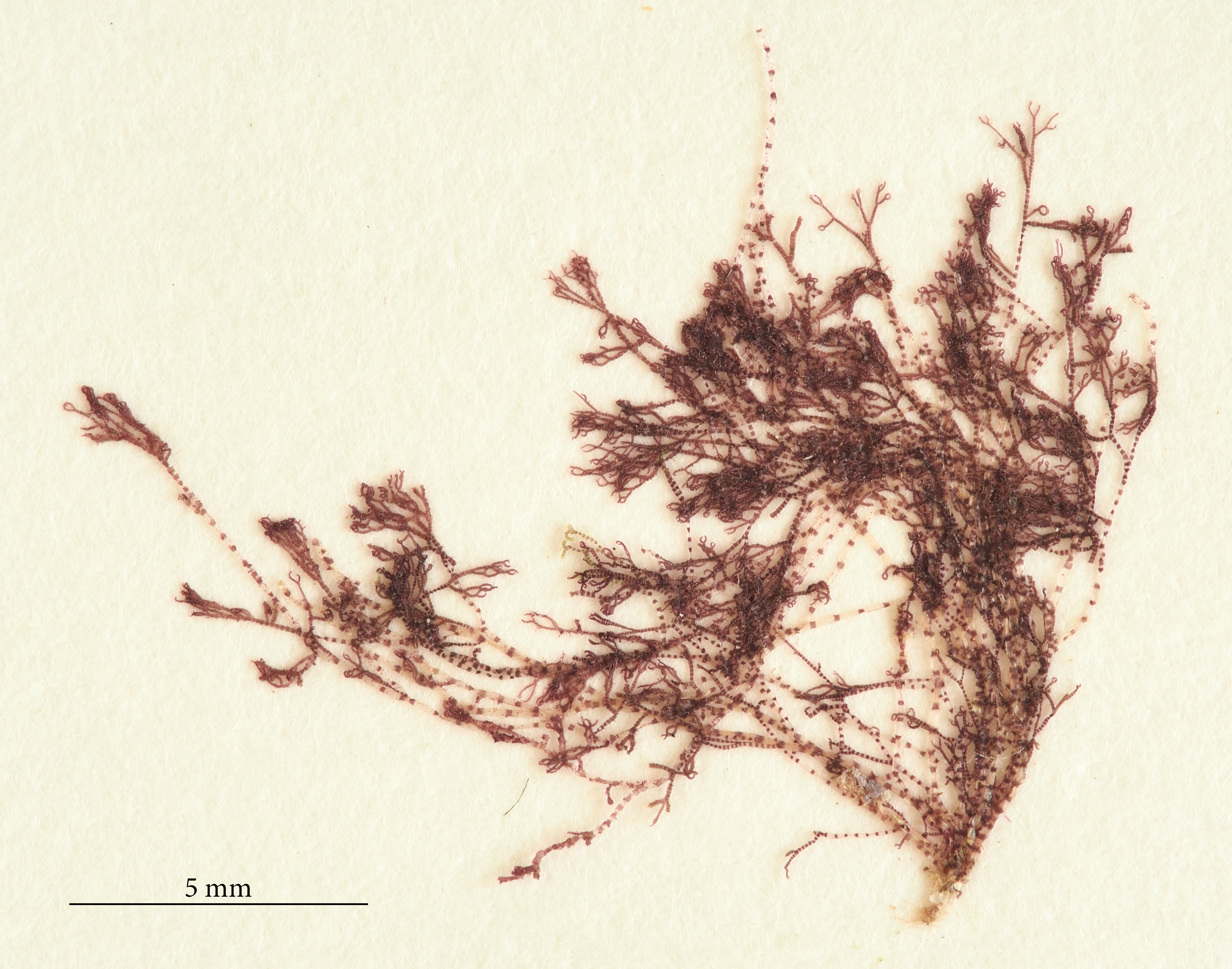

Scientific classification
- Domain: Eukaryota
- Clade: Archaeplastida
- Division: Rhodophyta
- Class: Florideophyceae
- Order: Ceramiales
- Family: Ceramiaceae
- Genus: Ceramium
- Species: C. shuttleworthianum

Binomial name
- Ceramium shuttleworthianum (Kützing) Silva

Synonyms
- Ceramium acanthonotum (Carmichael) J.Agardh

= Ceramium shuttleworthianum =

Species of alga

Ceramium shuttleworthianum is a small marine red alga.

== Description ==
Ceramium shuttleworthianum is a small alga fundamentally monosiphonous with densely interwoven branches. The cylindrical branches are incompletely corticate. Spines are formed in whorls on the cortical bands near the apices of the branches which are inrolled near the tips. The spines have a multicellular base merging with the cortical bands cells and are 2 to 3 cells long. Only 3 other species in the British Isles have spines which help in identification: Ceramium echionotum, Ceramium ciliatum, Ceramium gaditanum. on the rocks, mussels and in rock pools in the littoral.

== Habitat ==
Generally growing in the littoral zone and is common on exposed shores on barnacles and on mussel Mytilus and limpets.

== Distribution ==
Common around Great Britain, Isle of Man and Ireland. Recorded from the Atlantic coast of Europe and Iceland.

== Reproduction ==
The gametophytes are dioecious. Spermatangia are produced as are cystocarps and tetrasporangia.

== Conservation status ==
In Iceland, Ceramium shuttleworthianum has the conservation status of a vulnerable species (VU).
