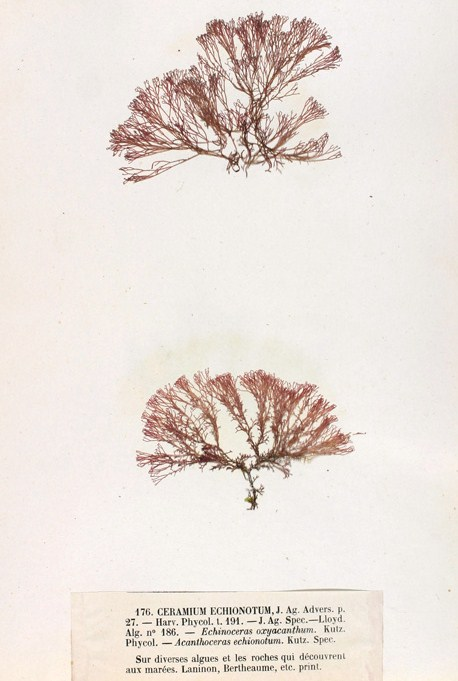

Scientific classification
- Clade: Archaeplastida
- Division: Rhodophyta
- Class: Florideophyceae
- Order: Ceramiales
- Family: Ceramiaceae
- Genus: Ceramium
- Species: C. echionotum

Binomial name
- Ceramium echionotum J.Agardh

= Ceramium echionotum =

Species of alga

Ceramium echionotum is a small marine alga in the division Rhodophyta.

== Description ==
This is a small branched alga no more than 15 cm long. It consists of large cells forming erect cylindrical filaments which are basically monosiphonous. At the nodes where the large axial cells meet there is cortication by small cells ascending and descending, these give a banded effect. The thalli grow in a rather tangled manner, matted at the base by rhizoids. The main branches are strongly rolled in at their apices and unicellular spines develop on the outer sides of the branches. The species is similar to Ceramium shuttleworthianum, Ceramium ciliatum and Ceramium gaditanum all of which have spines. In the British Isles, only Ceramium echionotum has spines formed of single cells which grow on the cortical bands.

== Distribution ==
Recorded in Ireland in the north-west and the north-east. Recorded from the east of Scotland, England, Isle of Man, the Channel Isles, Norway, the Canary Isles and the Azores.

== Reproduction ==
The species is dioecious producing spermatangia, carposporangia and tetraspores.
