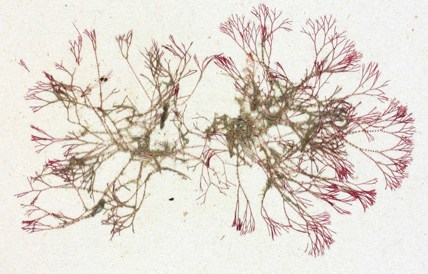

Scientific classification
- Clade: Archaeplastida
- Division: Rhodophyta
- Class: Florideophyceae
- Order: Ceramiales
- Family: Ceramiaceae
- Genus: Ceramium
- Species: C. cimbricum

Binomial name
- Ceramium cimbricum H.Petersen in Rosenvinge

= Ceramium cimbricum =

Species of alga

Ceramium cimbricum is a small red alga in the division Rhodophyta.

== Description ==
This small red alga is basically monosiphonous, rarely no more than 8 cm long. It consists of erect tufts of filaments. These filaments are branched and attached by rhizoids. The tips of the filaments are only slightly inrolled. Cortical cells develop at the nodes where the cells of the filament meet forming clear bands around the filaments, without spines.

== Habitat ==
Found on many other surfaces such as rock, shells and other algae to a depth of 26 m in the subtidal.

== Reproduction ==
The gametophytes are dioecious with separate male and female plants. Spermatangial sori, cystocarps and tetrasporangia are recorded.

== Distribution ==
Found around the shores of Ireland and Great Britain, also on coasts of Europe from Norway to France.
