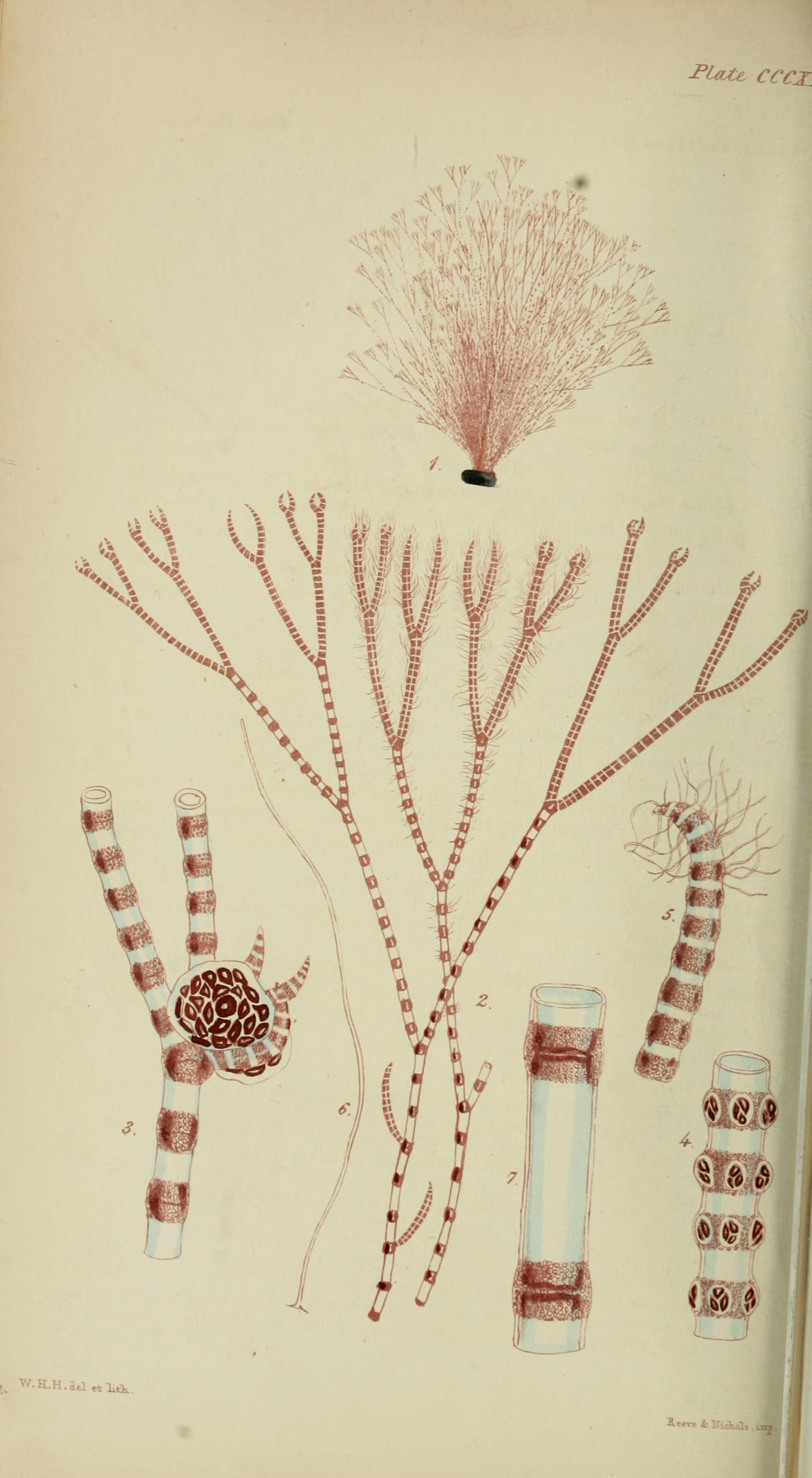

Scientific classification
- Domain: Eukaryota
- Clade: Archaeplastida
- Division: Rhodophyta
- Class: Florideophyceae
- Order: Ceramiales
- Family: Ceramiaceae
- Genus: Ceramium
- Species: C. strictum

Binomial name
- Ceramium strictum Roth

= Ceramium strictum =

Species of alga

Ceramium strictum is a small marine red alga.

== Description ==
This alga grows in tufts to a length of no more than 12 cm long. It is densely branched but not completely corticate appearing to have a banded or collar-like appearance. The apices of the axes are strongly inrolled. The branches do not have spines. Rhizoids are numerous.

== Reproduction ==
Cystocarps containing carposporangia and tetrasporangia are borne on the erect thalli.

== Habitat ==
Epiphytic on other algae and mussels in the littoral.

== Distribution ==
Southern and western coasts of England and Ireland. In Europe from Norway to France and the Azores.

== Nomenclature ==
The validity of the name Ceramium strictum is as yet unsure.
