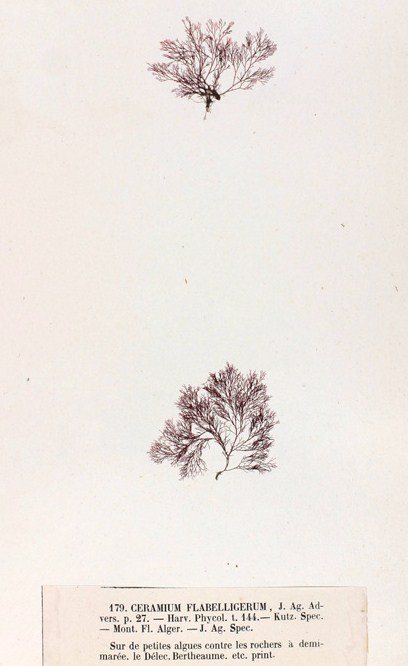

Scientific classification
- Clade: Archaeplastida
- Division: Rhodophyta
- Class: Florideophyceae
- Order: Ceramiales
- Family: Ceramiaceae
- Genus: Ceramium
- Species: C. gaditanum

Binomial name
- Ceramium gaditanum (Clemente) Cremades

= Ceramium gaditanum =

Species of alga

Ceramium gatitanum is a small marine red alga.

== Description ==
This finely branched alga grows to a length of 15 cm. Grows with erect axes and with many lateral branches. The branches are completely corticated and not in-rolled at the apices. Very small spines occur near the tips on the outer sides are parse and usually three cells long. These spines help to distinguish the species from others. In the British Isles only Ceramium echionotum, Ceramium shuttleworthianum and Ceramium ciliatum show spines.

== Reproduction ==
Cystocarps and tetrasporangia are recorded.

== Habitat ==
To be found growing epiphytically on other algae and also on rock in the lower littoral.

== Distribution ==
Recorded from the coasts of Great Britain, Ireland and the coast of Europe.
