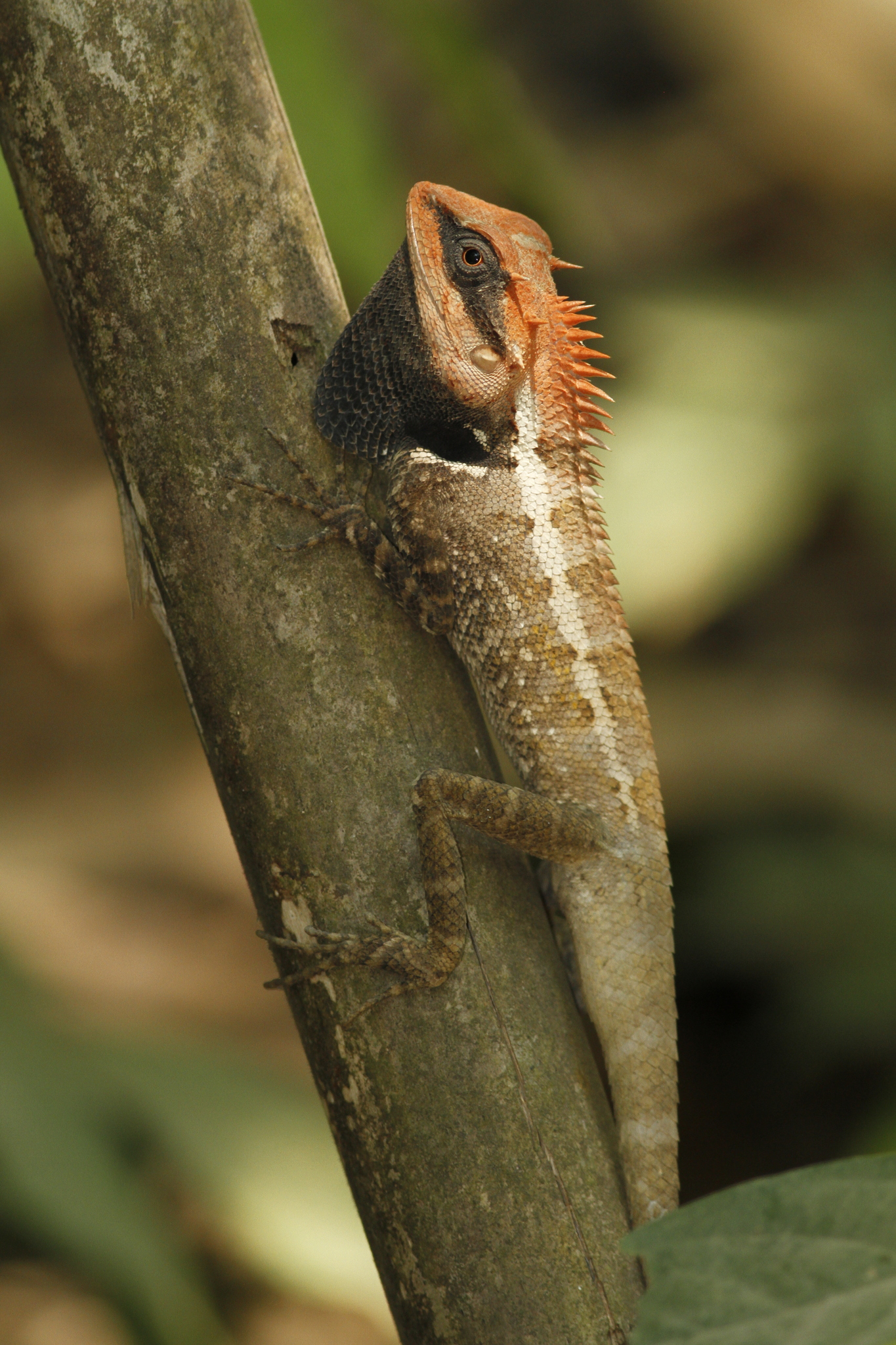

Conservation status
- Least Concern (IUCN 3.1)

Scientific classification
- Kingdom: Animalia
- Phylum: Chordata
- Class: Reptilia
- Order: Squamata
- Suborder: Iguania
- Family: Agamidae
- Genus: Calotes
- Species: C. emma

Binomial name
- Calotes emma Gray, 1845

Subspecies
- Calotes emma alticristatus Schmidt, 1925; Calotes emma emma Gray, 1845

= Calotes emma =

Species of lizard

Calotes emma, commonly known as the forest garden lizard or Emma Gray's forest lizard, is a species of lizard in the family Agamidae. The species is native to China, South Asia, and Southeast Asia. There are two recognized subspecies.

== Etymology ==
The specific name, emma, is in honor of English conchologist Maria Emma Gray, the wife of John Edward Gray, the describer of this species.

== Description ==
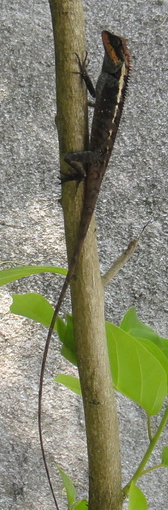

C. emma has the following morphology.

Physical Structure: There are three small groups of spines, completely separate from each other, on each side of the head, one behind the superciliary margin and two above each tympanum. The dorsal crest is well developed on the neck and on the anterior part of the trunk, gradually disappearing behind. There is a transverse fold in front of each shoulder, and the gular sac is but little developed. The tail is laterally compressed. There are about 51 series of scales round the middle of the trunk.

Color pattern: The dorsum is brownish olive, with brown bands across the back, which are lighter in the middle and interrupted by a white band running along each side of the back. The eyelids have short, radiating brown streaks. There is a brown band from behind the eye to above the tympanum. The fold before the shoulder is black, with an irregular white margin. The legs and tail have indistinct dark crossbands.

The maximum total length (including tail) is 40 cm (16 in). The usual total length is 28 cm (11 in), and the usual snout-to-vent length (SVL) a 7.5 cm (3.0 in).

== Geographic range ==
C. emma is found in Bangladesh (Satchari National Park, Bandarban Hill District), Cambodia, China (Guangdong, Yunnan), India (Assam), Laos, Malaysia (Peninsular), Myanmar, Thailand (including Phuket) & Vietnam (including Pulo Condore Islands) and Possibly in Bhutan.

"An inhabitant of Mergui, whence we have received it from Professor Oldham, ranging northwards perhaps to the Khasya Hills; extremely doubtful as an inhabitant of Afghanistan. Mr. Blyth mentions it amongst a collection made by Captain Bedmore at Schwe Gyen on the Sitang River in Pegu".

== Vernacular names ==
Vernacular names for C. emma in various languages include the following.

- Bengali: কেশর গিরিগিটি, ঝুঁটি গিরিগিটি, ঝুঁটি রক্তচোষা, যুথিয়াল গিরিগিটি (Juthial girigiti)
- Burmese: Poat-Tin-Nyo
- Chinese: 棕背树蜥
- English: crested forest lizard, Emma Gray's crested forest lizard, Emma Gray's forest lizard, spiny-headed forest lizard.

== Behavior and habitat ==
C. emma is terrestrial, arboreal, and diurnal. It inhabits various forest habitats including dry deciduous, coastal, and moist evergreen.

== Diet ==
C. emma is insectivorous, preying upon termites, grasshoppers, ants, cockroaches, beetles, diverse species of moths and low flying butterflies, and soil-living insects and their larvae.

== Reproduction ==
C. emma is oviparous. The adult female lays 10-12 eggs in May–June. The incubation period is about 60–70 days.

== Human uses ==
C. emma is used in the pet trade. It plays a role in the ecosystem by eating various types of insects and otherwise.

== Threat to humans ==
C. emma is non-venomous and completely harmless to humans.

== IUCN threat status ==
C. emma has been evaluated as "Least Concern" (LC) by the IUCN.

== Subspecies ==
Two subspecies of C. emma are recognized as being valid, including the nominotypical subspecies.

- Calotes emma alticristatus Schmidt, 1925
- Calotes emma emma Gray, 1845
