= Maria Emma Gray =

English conchologist, algologist and scientific illustrator

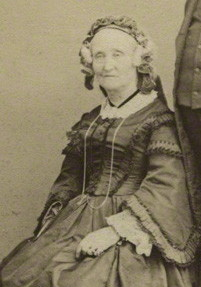
- Maria Emma Gray in 1863
- Born: Maria Emma Smith; 1787; Greenwich, London, England
- Died: 9 December 1876 (aged 88–89)
- Occupations: Conchologist, algologist and scientific illustrator
- Spouses: Francis Edward Gray (m. 1810; died 1814) John Edward Gray (m. 1826)
- Children: 2
- Parent: Lieutenant Henry Smith

Maria Emma Gray (1787 – 9 December 1876) was an English conchologist, algologist and scientific illustrator.

== Family ==
Her father was Lieutenant Henry Smith, R.N., and he was resident at Greenwich Hospital at the time of her birth.

== Life ==
Gray was born in 1787 at Greenwich Hospital. She married in 1810 Francis Edward Gray, who died four years later, and had by him two daughters, who survived her. Both daughters, Emma Juliana Gray Smith and Sophia Elizabeth Gray Stokes, were also scientific illustrators. In 1826 she married his second cousin, John Edward Gray. She greatly assisted her second husband in his scientific work, especially by her drawings. Between 1842 and 1874 she published privately five volumes of etchings, entitled Figures of Molluscan Animals for the use of Students, and she mounted and arranged most of the Cuming collection of shells in the British Museum.

She also made a study of algae. Joseph Dalton Hooker entrusted her with the responsibility of working on the collection of noted algae specialist Amelia Griffiths' algae specimens. Gray selected appropriate type specimens from that collection and these were held at Kew's herbarium. In gratitude for that work, she was given duplicates from Griffiths algae collection and arranged these into sets for presentation to scientific and educational institutions throughout the country so as to encourage the pursuit of this subject. One such set is held by the Linnean Society. She also worked at the British Museum curating algae specimens. Her own collection was bequeathed to the Cambridge University Museum. Her assistance in this branch of her husband's studies was commemorated by him in 1866 in the algae genus Grayemma. Similarly, he named two species of lizards in her honor: Calotes maria and Calotes emma. He also named the species Scapha maria-emma, now known as Cymbiola mariaemma, after her. He went on to have a bronze medallion struck in 1863, bearing both their portraits, a copy of which is in the possession of the Linnean Society. Gray survived her husband by a year, dying on 9 December 1876.

=== Gallery ===
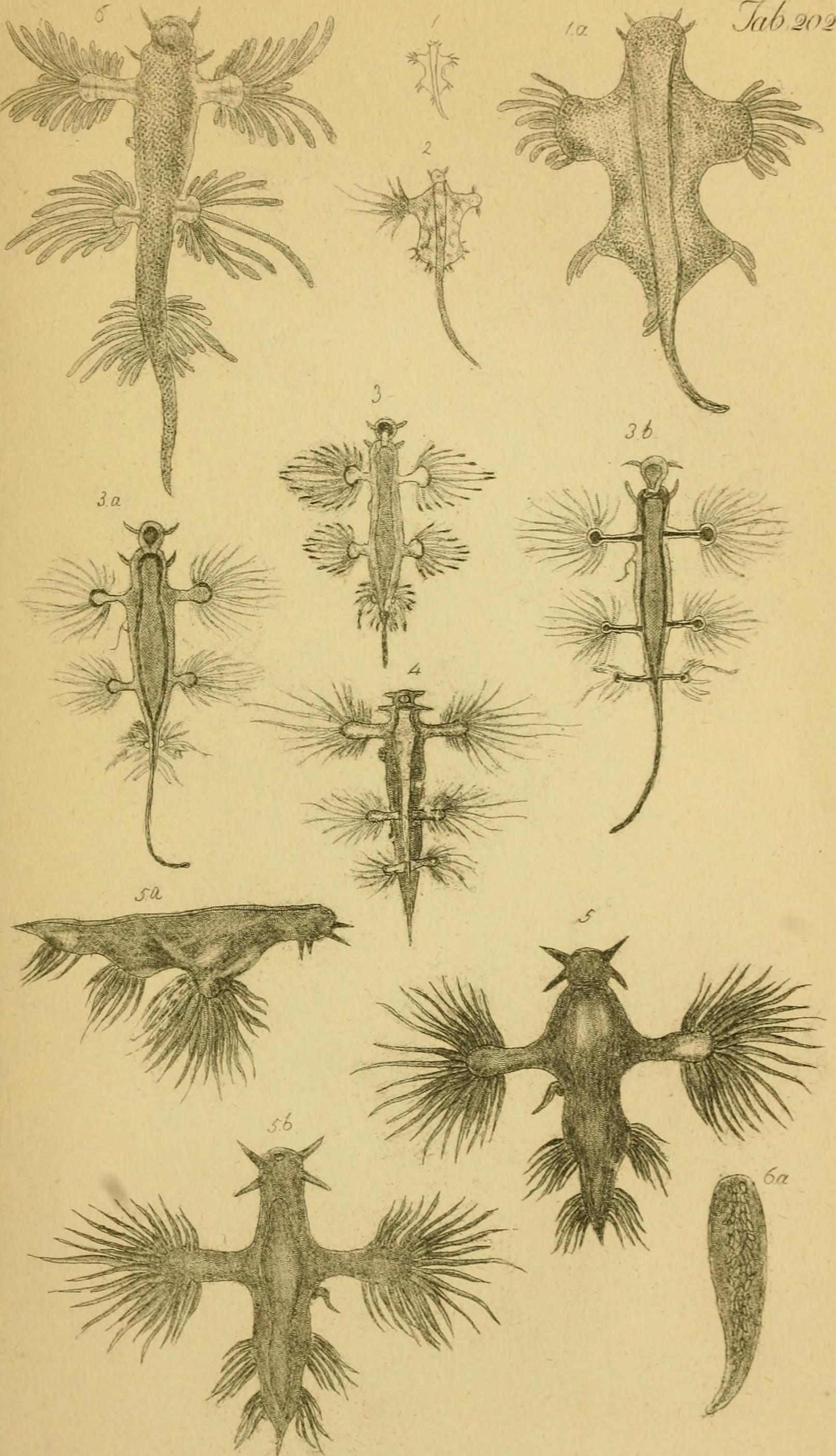
Nudibranchs

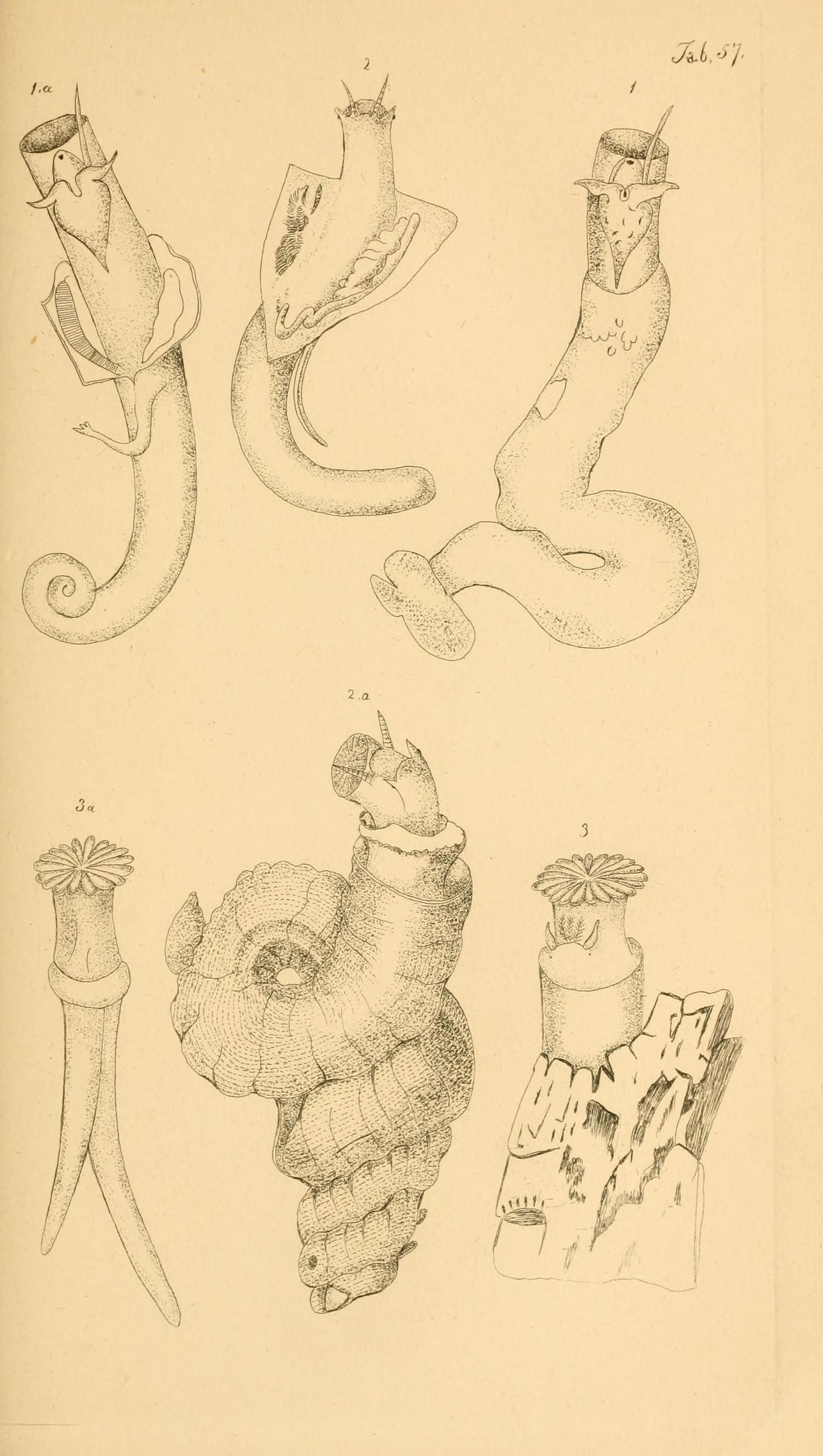
Molluscs

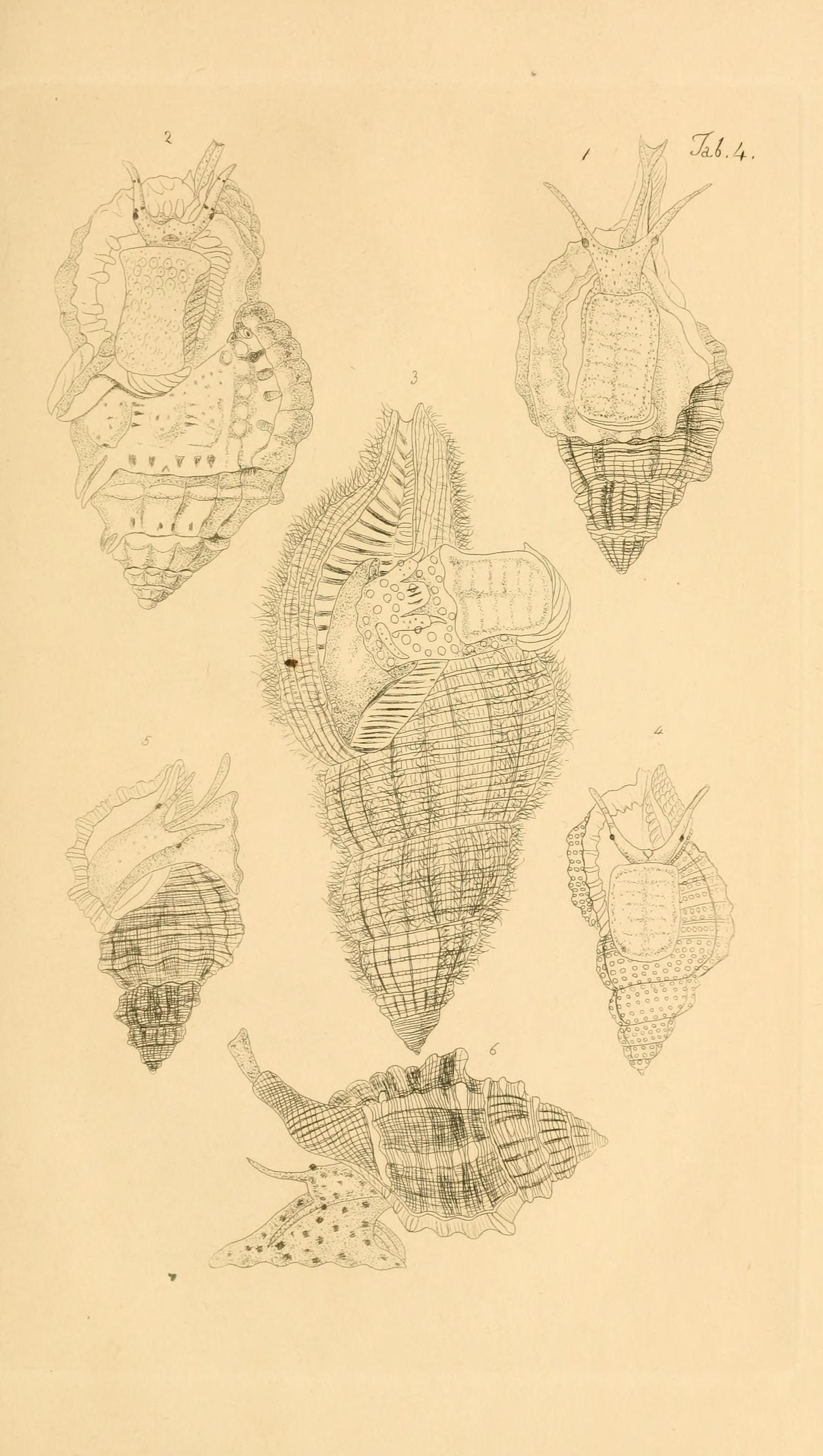
Unidentified

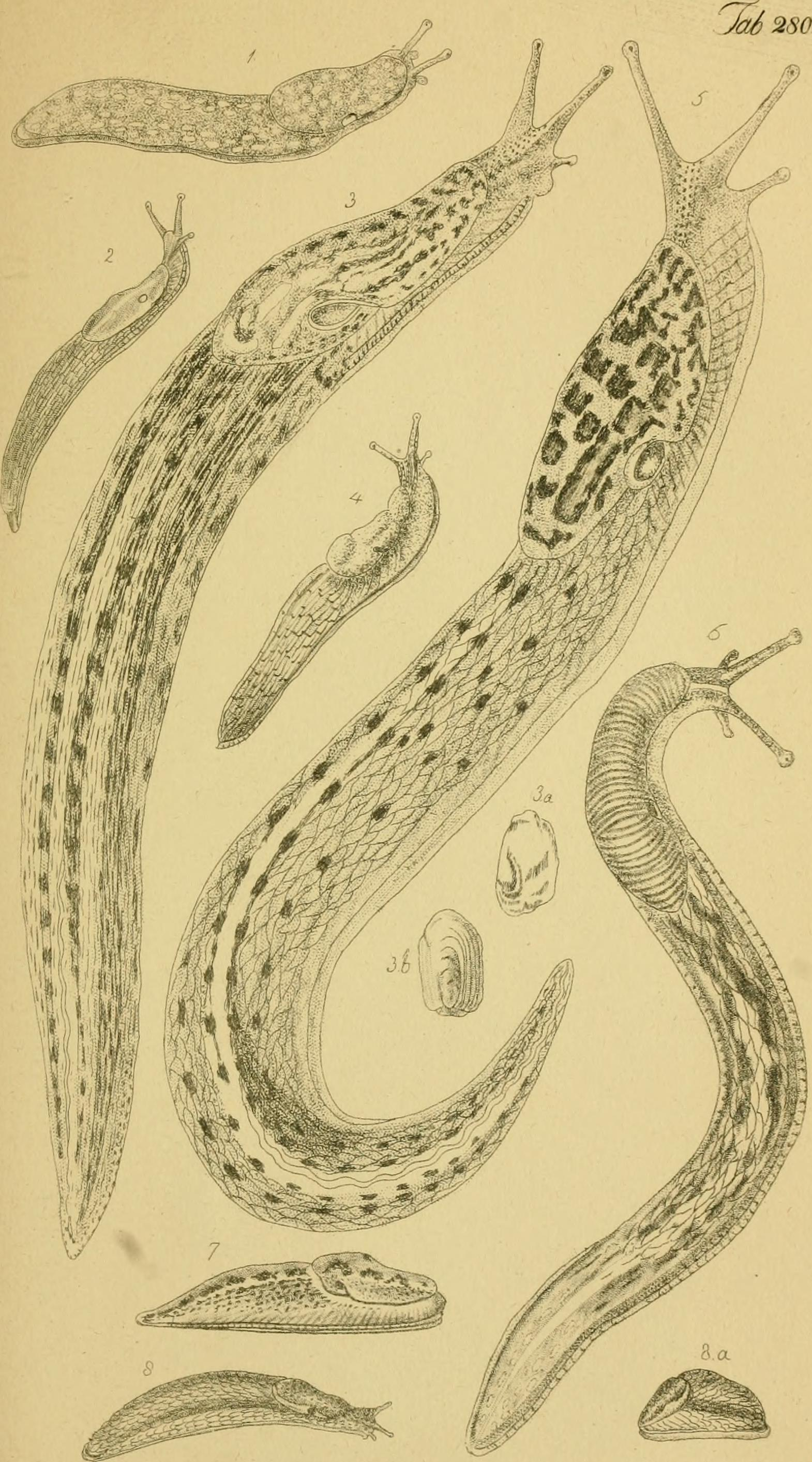
Slugs
