= Mary Wyatt =

British Botanist

- Born: 1789
- Died: 1871 (aged 81–82); Devon, England
- Occupations: Botanist, phycologist, retailer
- Notable work: Algae Danmonienses or Dried Specimens of Marine Plants, Principally Collected in Devonshire; Carefully Named According to Dr. Hooker's British Flora (1834-1841)

Mary Wyatt (1789–1871) was a British botanist, phycologist and retailer from Torquay, Devon. She was the compiler of the respected Algae Danmonienses - a collection, i.e. exsiccata, of seaweeds to which William Henry Harvey later considered his Manual of the British Algae (1841) a 'companion' work. Wyatt helped to fuel the Victorian 'seaweed craze' for collecting. The tongue twister 'She Sells Seashells on the Sea Shore' was possibly inspired by Wyatt and her close companion Amelia Griffiths, with whom she collected seaweed and sea shells in Devon.

== Life ==
Mary Wyatt was born in 1789 and, from humble beginnings, went on to be a respected collector and proprietor of seaweeds and sea shells, with a shop in Torquay. Wyatt had worked as a servant for the family of phycologist and seaweed collector Amelia Warren Griffiths, who encouraged Wyatt to pursue her own work in the field. Wyatt accompanied Griffiths on her collecting expeditions, learning from her, but has been described as otherwise 'quite illiterate' having had no other formal education.

Wyatt opened her shop at 7 Torwood Row, Torquay selling corals, dried seaweeds, mosses, and other seaside souvenirs. This helped to support her and her husband, who was a "permanent invalid". According to Bea Howe, it was at the suggestion of botanist William Henry Harvey that Wyatt began to prepare a named collection of seaweeds, supervised by Griffiths. Ultimately, Wyatt produced five volumes of mounted specimens of Devon marine algae titled Algae Danmonienses, published between 1833 and 1841. Each volume contained approximately 50 different species, and the supplement included examples from Cornwall, as well as from Devonshire: a further 36 species. Each specimen was named and numbered according William Jackson Hooker's British Flora, and other works on British algae, with a short description of the habitat and locality where the seaweed is found, and an indication of its rarity. These sold well, contributing to the popularity of seaweed collecting at seaside resorts in early Victorian Britain. The Journal of Botany called them "remarkable".

Algae Danmonienses: or dried specimens of Marine Plants, principally collected in Devonshire by Mary Wyatt; carefully named according to Dr. Hooker's British Flora' was described as "a most important work... composed of specimens of 234 species, beautifully dried and correctly named... Nature’s own pencil illustrating herself". William Henry Harvey went on to refer readers to Wyatt's work on the publication of his own (unillustrated) Manual of the British Algae (1841), urging them to consider his work a “companion” to Algae Danmonienses. Wyatt also corresponded with other naturalists, including Lewis Weston Dillwyn, to whom she sent specimens for identification.

== Death and legacy ==
Mary Wyatt died in 1871, aged 82.

The Royal Botanic Garden Edinburgh holds collections gathered by Wyatt between 1833 and 1840. The work of Wyatt and Griffiths, 'an active collaboration, as they scrambled across rocky shores in cumbersome skirts, compared notes and exchanged specimens in real time', has been explored by Frankie Dytor as part of 'Out and About: Queering the Museum': a National Lottery Heritage-funded project focused on uncovering and celebrating LGBTQ+ heritage among the collections of the Royal Albert Memorial Museum and Art Gallery (RAMM) in Exeter.
