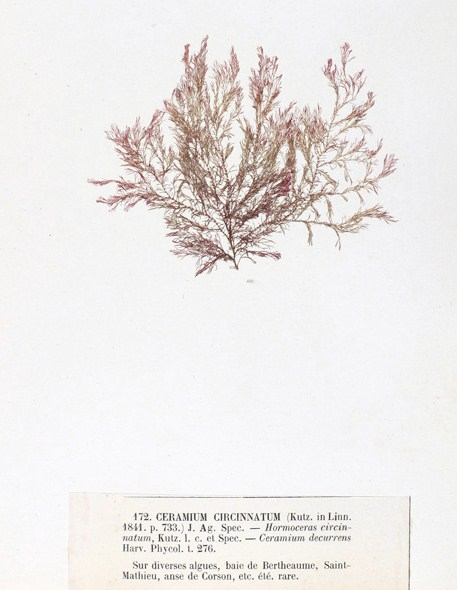
- dried specimen of Ceramium circinatum

Scientific classification
- Clade: Archaeplastida
- Division: Rhodophyta
- Class: Florideophyceae
- Order: Ceramiales
- Family: Ceramiaceae
- Genus: Ceramium
- Species: C. circinatum

Binomial name
- Ceramium circinatum (Kützing) J.Agardh

= Ceramium circinatum =

Species of alga

Ceramium circinatum is a small marine red algae.

== Description ==
This small red alga is filamentous, cylindrical with branched axes. It has 10 periaxial cells, that is a ring of cells forming a ring around the axis. It is not completely corticated and does not bear spines. The apices of the branches are hooked inwards.

== Distribution ==
This is a Mediterranean species. Records shown from Great Britain may be misidentifications as it may be mistaken as Ceramium virgatum. However, it is reported from Iceland where the species is red listed a vulnerable species (VU).
