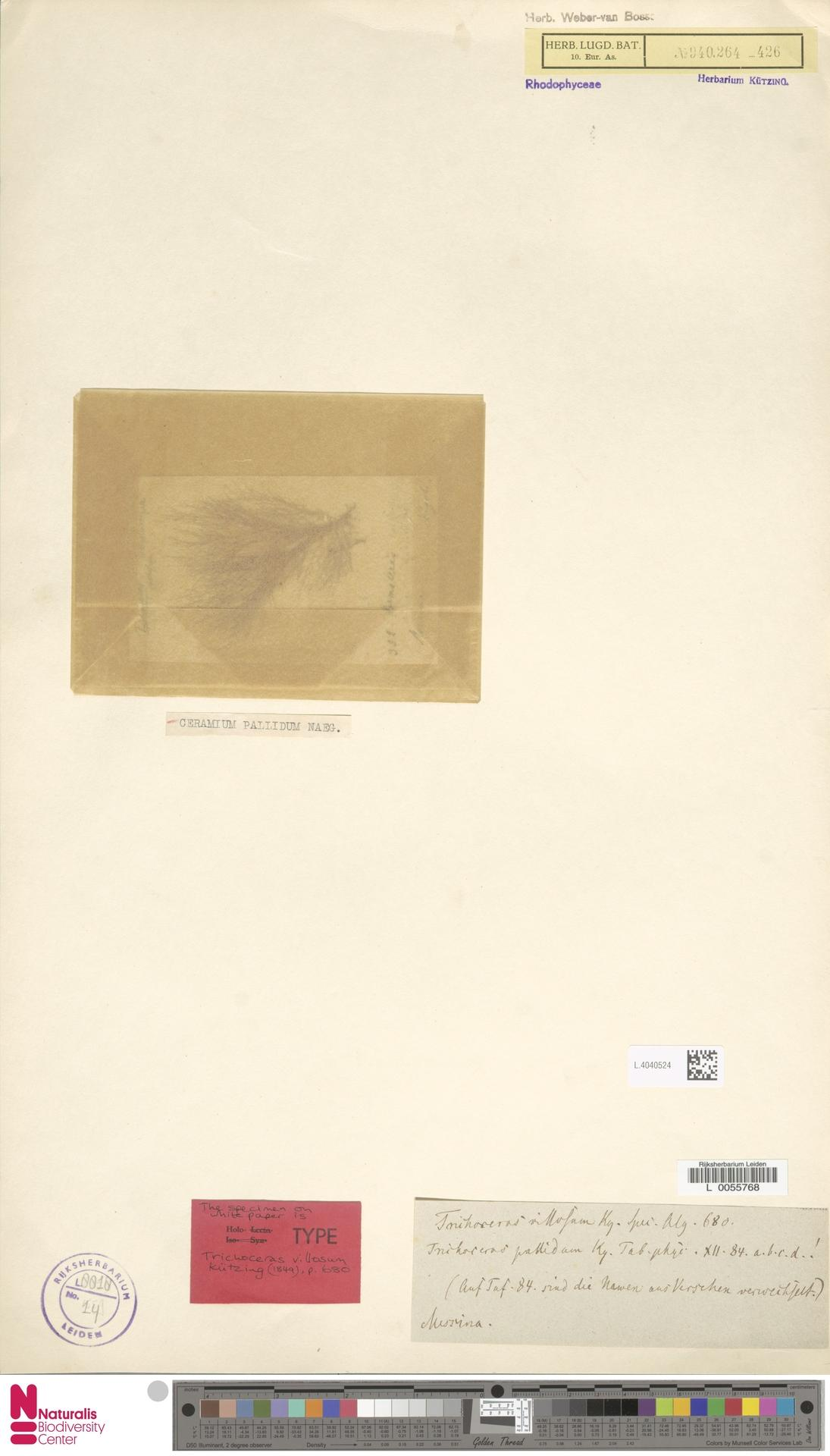

Scientific classification
- Domain: Eukaryota
- Clade: Archaeplastida
- Division: Rhodophyta
- Class: Florideophyceae
- Order: Ceramiales
- Family: Ceramiaceae
- Genus: Ceramium
- Species: C. pallidum

Binomial name
- Ceramium pallidum (Nägeli ex Kützing) Maggs & Hommersand

Synonyms
- Trichoceras pallidum Kützing

= Ceramium pallidum =

Species of alga

Ceramium pallidum is a small marine alga. It occurs in waters off of Europe and Africa (Morocco).

== Description ==
Ceramium pallidum is a small filamentous, regularly branched delicate alga. The axes can reach 12 cm long and are attached by multicellular rhizoids. The structure is basically of a monosiphonous axis and erect branches with strongly inrolled apices. The segments are either fully corticate or ecorticate at the internodes which gives a banded appearance.

== Reproduction ==
The gametophytes are dioecious or monoecious. Spermatangial sori occur on young axes and cystocarps contain numerous carposporangia. The tetrasporangia occur in whorls on the younger branches.

== Habitat ==
Epiphytic on other algae in the littoral zone as well as the sublittoral.

== Distribution ==
Recorded from the coasts of Great Britain, Ireland, France, the Netherlands, Norway, Portogal, Spain (including the Canary Islands), and Morocco.
