= Ceramium siliquosum =

Scientific classification
- Clade: Archaeplastida
- Division: Rhodophyta
- Class: Florideophyceae
- Order: Ceramiales
- Family: Ceramiaceae
- Genus: Ceramium
- Species: C. siliquosum

Binomial name
- Ceramium siliquosum (Kützing) Maggs and Hommersand

Species of alga

The taxon Ceramium siliquosum is a small marine alga. It belongs to the red algae genus Ceramium.

== Description ==
This small red alga grows to no more than 18 cm high. It is basically monosiphonous with distinct main branches which are cylindrical and corticated at the nodes. These incompletely corticate internodes appear collar-like around the branches. The tips of the branches are curled inwards and do not bear spines.

== Reproduction ==
The gametophytes are dioecious. Spermatangia occur in sori which cover the cortical bands. Cystocarps containing carposporangia and terasporangia occur in whorls at the nodes.

== Habitat ==
Found growing as an epiphyte on other algae in rock pools of the lower littoral to 12m depth.

== Distribution ==
Recorded from Ireland from County Donegal. and Great Britain. In Europe from France and Spain.
