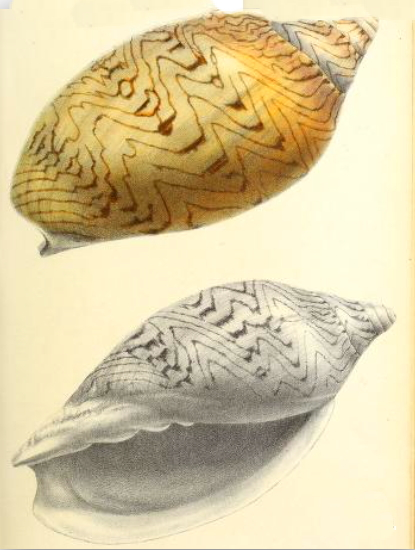
- Original image of a shell of Cymbiola mariaemma

Scientific classification
- Kingdom: Animalia
- Phylum: Mollusca
- Class: Gastropoda
- Subclass: Caenogastropoda
- Order: Neogastropoda
- Family: Volutidae
- Genus: Cymbiola
- Species: C. mariaemma

Binomial name
- Cymbiola mariaemma Gray, 1858

Synonyms
- Cymbiola (Cymbiola) mariaemma (J. E. Gray, 1858) alternative representation; Scapha mariaemma Gray, 1858 superseded combination; Voluta grayae Crosse, 1871

= Cymbiola mariaemma =

Species of gastropod

Cymbiola mariaemma is a species of sea snail, a marine gastropod mollusk in the family Volutidae, the volutes.

It was first described by John Edward Gray in 1858 under the name Scapha maria-emma and was named in honor of his wife, Maria Emma Gray, a fellow conchologist and algologist.

== Description ==
Shell size 140 mm.

(Original description) The shell features an ovate and fusiform shape, set against a pale brown background. It is intricately decorated with narrow, deeply waved, longitudinal dark brown lines. These lines naturally align to form four somewhat distinct, interrupted spiral bands, which are specifically composed of the broader and straighter segments of those longitudinal lines. At the top, the shell's nucleus is large and subcylindrical, displaying a regular spiral that culminates in a smooth, rounded apex without any crenulation near the suture. Furthermore, the shell possesses a conical spire, somewhat ventricose whorls, and a rather arched outer lip.

== Distribution ==
Indo-Pacific region: Singapore; Sulawesi, Indonesia.
