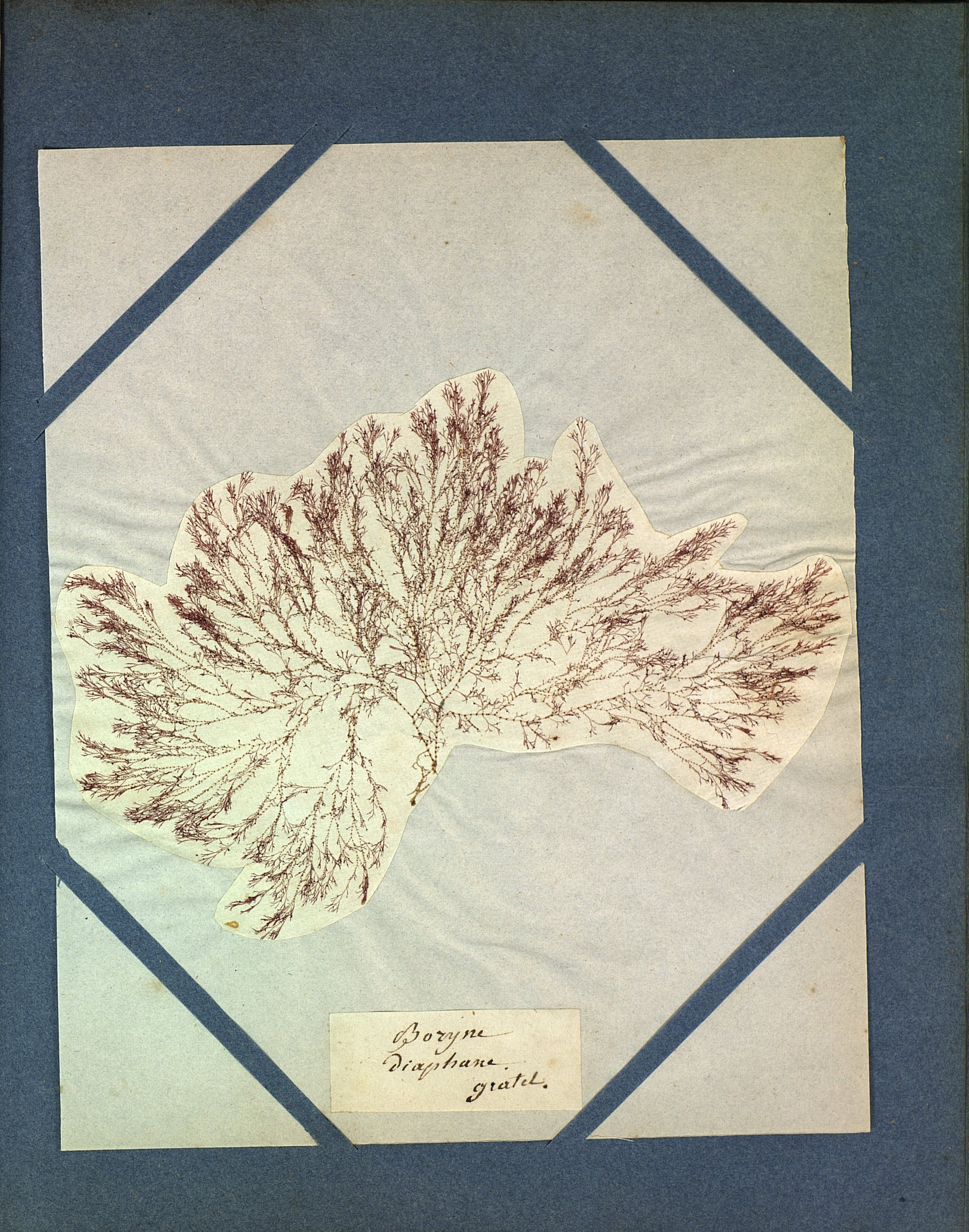
- Nineteenth-century museum specimen

Scientific classification
- Clade: Archaeplastida
- Division: Rhodophyta
- Class: Florideophyceae
- Order: Ceramiales
- Family: Ceramiaceae
- Genus: Ceramium
- Species: C. diaphanum

Binomial name
- Ceramium diaphanum (Lightfoot) Roth 1806

Subspecies
- Ceramium diaphanum arachnoides C.Agardh; Ceramium diaphanum aucklandicum J.D.Hooker & Harvey; Ceramium diaphanum capense Simons; Ceramium diaphanum capricornu (Reinsch) Foslie 1893; Ceramium diaphanum corticatulostrictum Kylin; Ceramium diaphanum corticatulum H.E.Petersen; Ceramium diaphanum decipiens Schiffner; Ceramium diaphanum elegans (Roth) Roth 1806; Ceramium diaphanum fastigiatum (Roth) Trevisan; Ceramium diaphanum gracile Ardissone; Ceramium diaphanum herbaceum (Roth) Roth; Ceramium diaphanum indicum Feldmann-Mazoyer 1952; Ceramium diaphanum minor P.L.Crouan & H.M.Crouan 1865; Ceramium diaphanum patentissima Foslie; Ceramium diaphanum pilosum (Roth) C.Agardh; Ceramium diaphanum pulcher Shperk; Ceramium diaphanum radiculosum (Grunow) H.E.Petersen; Ceramium diaphanum rigidum A.W.Griffiths & Harvey; Ceramium diaphanum serpens Montagne; Ceramium diaphanum strictotenuissimum (H.E.Petersen) Kylin; Ceramium diaphanum strictum Celan & Serbanescu 1969; Ceramium diaphanum typicum H.E.Petersen; Ceramium diaphanum virescens Lyngbye; Ceramium diaphanum zostericola acrocarpum (Kutzing) Feldmann-Mazoyer 1941; Ceramium diaphanum zostericola H.E.Petersen

Synonyms
- Ceramium elegans (Roth) Ducluzeau, accepted as Ceramium diaphanum var. elegans (Roth) Roth, 1806; Conferva elegans Roth, 1797, accepted as Ceramium diaphanum var. elegans (Roth) Roth, 1806

= Ceramium diaphanum =

Species of alga

Ceramium diaphanum is a species of marine red algae (or Rhodophyta).

== Description ==
This small filamentous alga grows attached, or unattached, in masses reaching 20 cm across. The branches grow pseudochotomously the tips are strongly coiled in. It is corticated only at the nodes between the axial cells and form clear cortical bands. The rhizoids are multicellular.

== Reproduction ==
The full life history is not yet confirmed. Tetraspores have been recorded in groups on the nodes.

== Habitat ==
Growing as attached or unattached clumps on other algae and Zostera at low littoral to 3 m deep.

== Distribution ==
Widely distributed in Ireland, England and Scotland.Isle of Man. Reported from Norway and United States of America.
