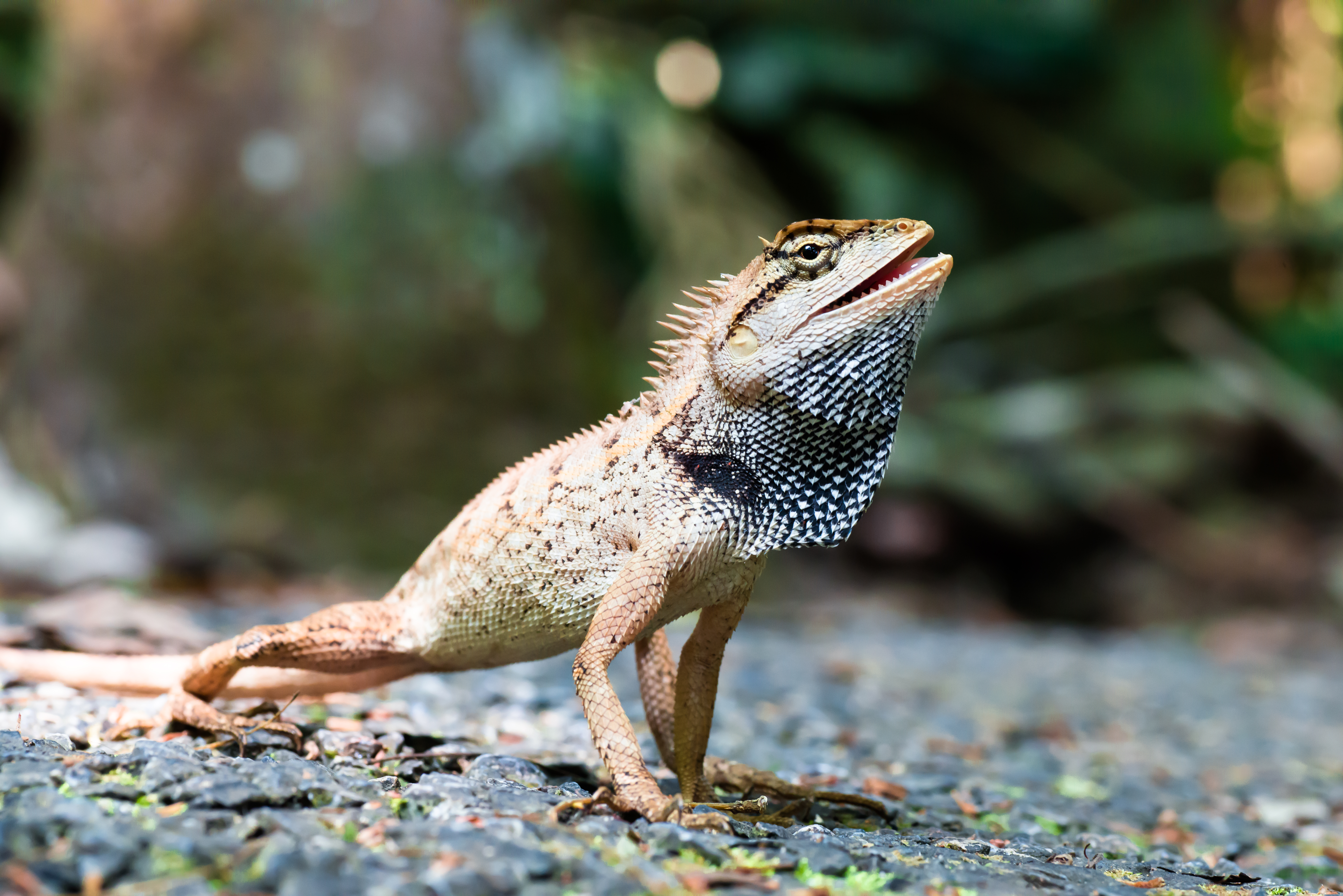
- Calotes emma alticristatus in Khao Yai National Park, Thailand

Scientific classification
- Kingdom: Animalia
- Phylum: Chordata
- Class: Reptilia
- Order: Squamata
- Suborder: Iguania
- Family: Agamidae
- Genus: Calotes
- Species: C. emma
- Subspecies: C. e. alticristatus

Trinomial name
- Calotes emma alticristatus Schmidt, 1925

= Calotes emma alticristatus =

Subspecies of lizard

Calotes emma alticristatus is a subspecies of Calotes emma. The subspecies is native to Thailand and Yunnan in China.
