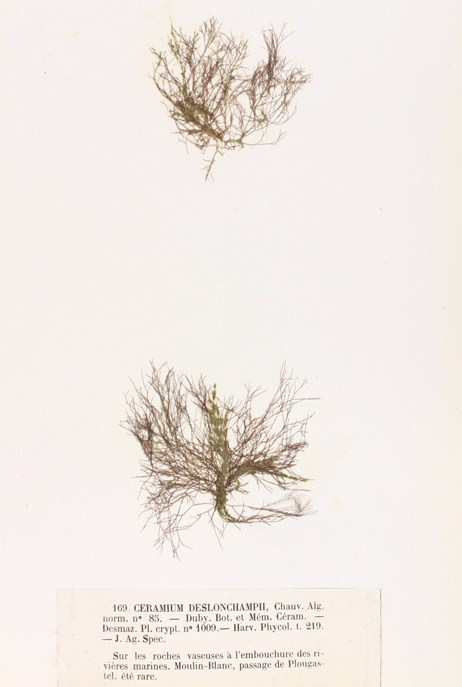

Scientific classification
- Clade: Archaeplastida
- Division: Rhodophyta
- Class: Florideophyceae
- Order: Ceramiales
- Family: Ceramiaceae
- Genus: Ceramium
- Species: C. deslongchampsii

Binomial name
- Ceramium deslongchampsii Chauvin ex Duby

= Ceramium deslongchampsii =

Species of alga

Ceramium deslongchampsii is a small marine red alga in the Division Rhodophyta.

== Description ==
This species is a relatively small alga growing as dense tufts to no more than 12 cm long. Grows as densely branched monosiphonous axes consisting of large cells showing cortication only at the nodes. It branches pseudodichotomously but with abundant adventitious branches. The tips of the branches are straight or slightly in-rolled and without spines. The prostrate axes are attached by rhizoids.

== Reproduction ==
Spermatangial sori, cystocarps and tetrasporangia are recorded.

== Habitat ==
To be found on the rock, dead shells and other algae to a depth of 26 m.

== Distribution ==
Generally common around Britain and Ireland. Recorded in Europe from Norway to France and the Mediterranean.
