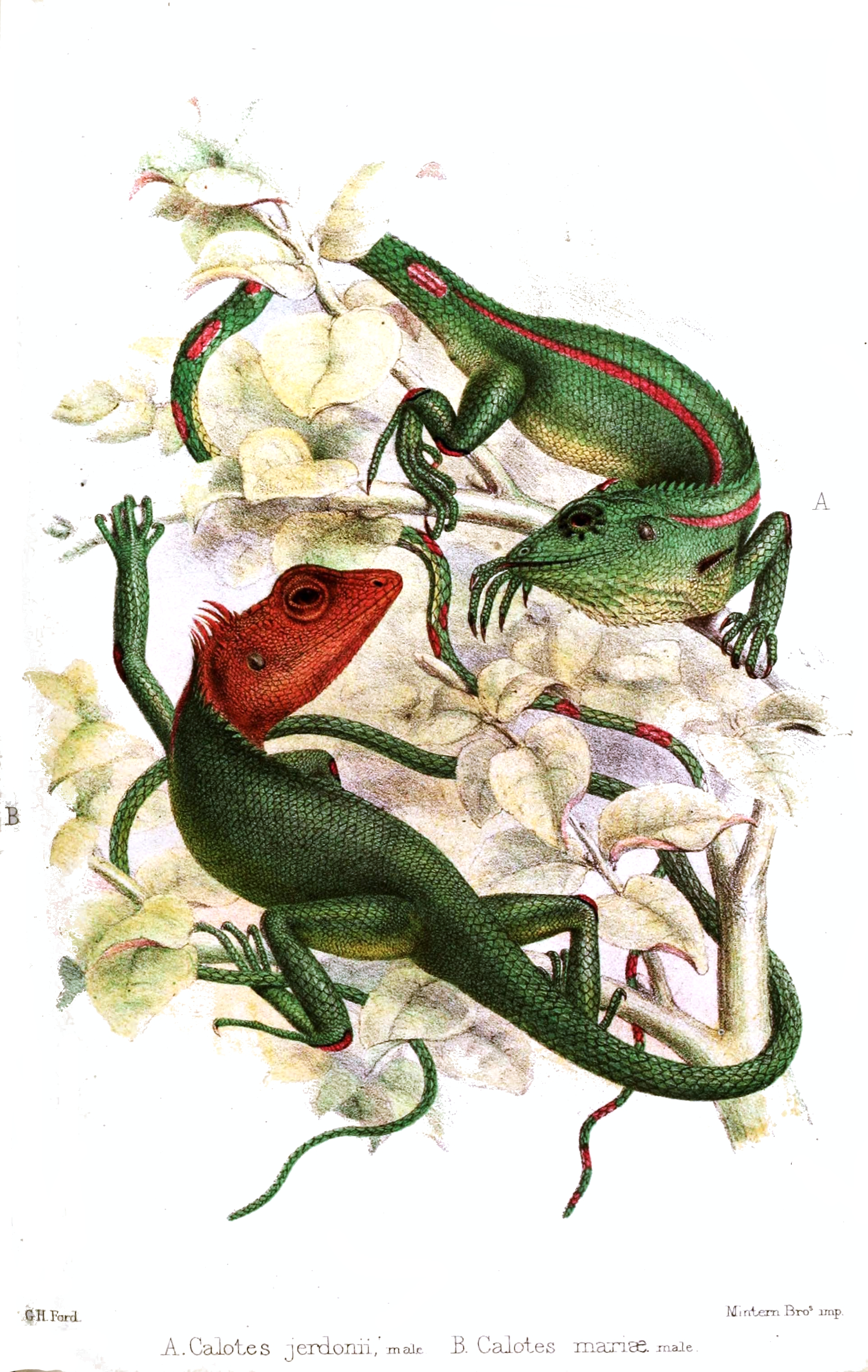

Conservation status
- Least Concern (IUCN 3.1)

Scientific classification
- Kingdom: Animalia
- Phylum: Chordata
- Class: Reptilia
- Order: Squamata
- Suborder: Iguania
- Family: Agamidae
- Genus: Calotes
- Species: C. maria

Binomial name
- Calotes maria Gray, 1845

= Calotes maria =

Species of lizard

Calotes maria, also called commonly the Khasi Hills forest lizard and the Assam garden lizard, is a species of lizard in the subfamily Draconinae of the family Agamidae. The species is native to South Asia.

== Geographic range ==
Calotes maria is found in Northeast India (Khasi Hills in Assam, Meghalaya, and Mizoram) and in Bhutan. It is also reported from north-eastern Bangladesh.

== Etymology ==
The specific name, maria, may be in honor of English conchologist Maria Emma Gray, the wife of John Edward Gray, the describer of this species.

== Morphology ==
The body of Calotes maria is compressed, whereas the tail is almost round, slender, feebly compressed, and covered with keeled scales. The head is large. Both males and females have moderately developed nuchal and dorsal crests. The dorsal colour is green with red streaks and spots. The male develops a brilliant red colour on its head during the breeding season. C. maria may attain a snout-to-vent length of 12 cm (4.7 in), and a tail length of 37 cm (15 in).

== Vernacular names ==
- English: Khasi Hills forest lizard, Assam garden lizard
- Bengali: খাসি রক্তচোষা, খাসিয়া গিরিগিটি (Khasia girigiti) (proposed)

== Behaviour ==
Calotes maria is arboreal and diurnal.

== Habitat ==
Calotes maria occurs in forests, generally close to streams, at elevations of 122–1,500 m (400–4,921 ft) above sea level.

== Diet ==
Calotes maria is mainly insectivorous, i.e., feeds on insects. It is diurnal in its foraging behavior, i.e., active during daylight hours.

== Reproduction ==
Calotes maria is oviparous. Like other lizards, it is also polygynandrous and promiscuous and both the male and the female mate with several partners.

== Conservation ==
Despite its relatively small range, Calotes maria has been assessed as of least concern – it is facing no major threats and is present in well-protected areas (Royal Manas National Park, Bhutan, and the adjacent Manas National Park, Assam; Lengteng Wildlife Sanctuary, Mizoram). It is a rare species.
