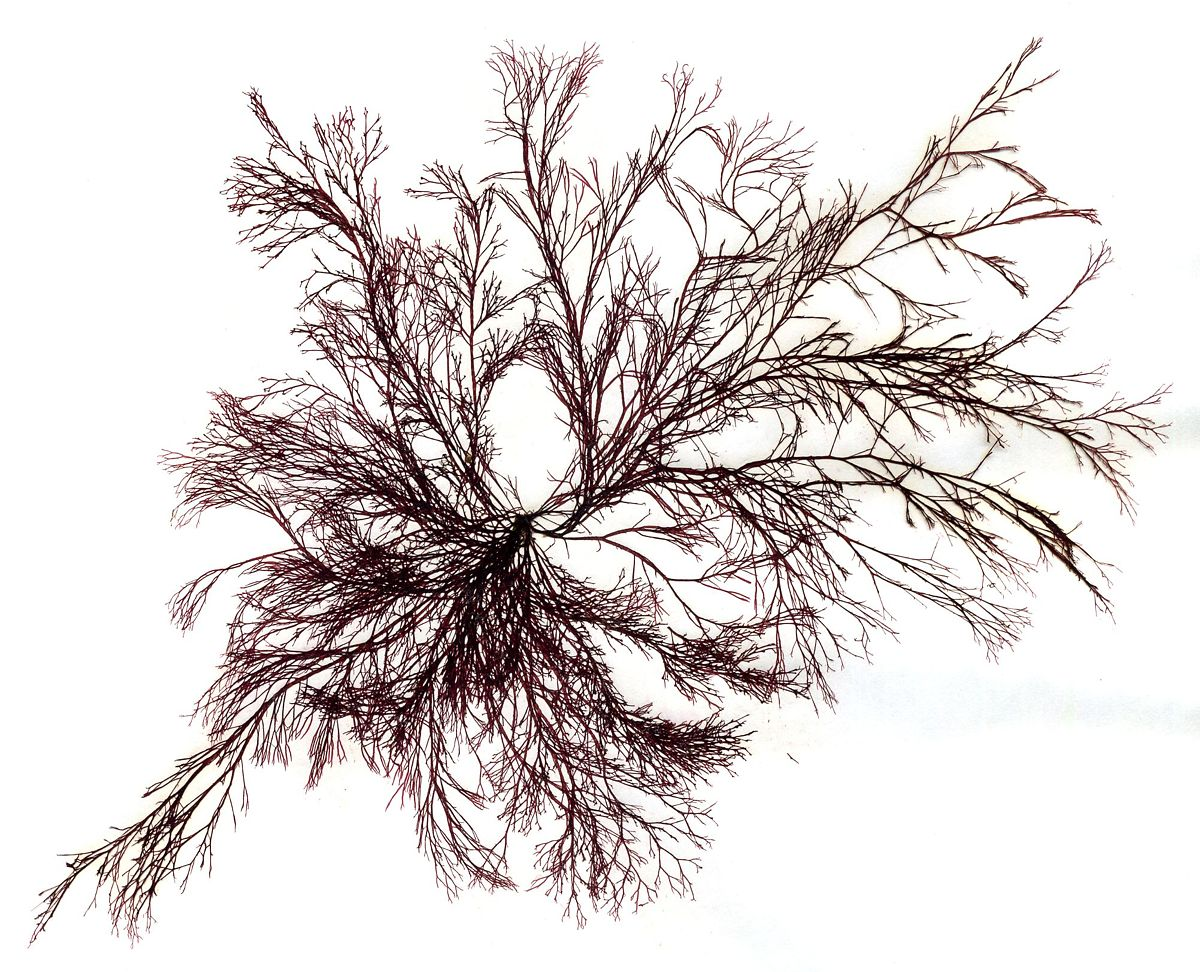

Scientific classification
- Clade: Archaeplastida
- Division: Rhodophyta
- Class: Florideophyceae
- Order: Ceramiales
- Family: Ceramiaceae
- Genus: Ceramium
- Species: C. virgatum

Binomial name
- Ceramium virgatum Roth

= Ceramium virgatum =

Species of alga

Ceramium virgatum, or the red hornweed, is a small red marine alga.

== Description ==
This small alga grows erect with cylindrical filamentous axes. It is repeatedly branched, corticate and grow to 30 cm long. Very difficult to identify from some other species.

== Habitat ==
Common in rock pools and in the upper sub-littoral in a wide range of habitats.

== Distribution ==
Widely distributed around the British Isles including the Isle of Man and the Shetland Islands.

== Nomenclature ==
The non-spiny species of Ceramium are in taxonomic chaos and there is confusion concerning this species which is referred to as Ceramium nodulosum in some references.
