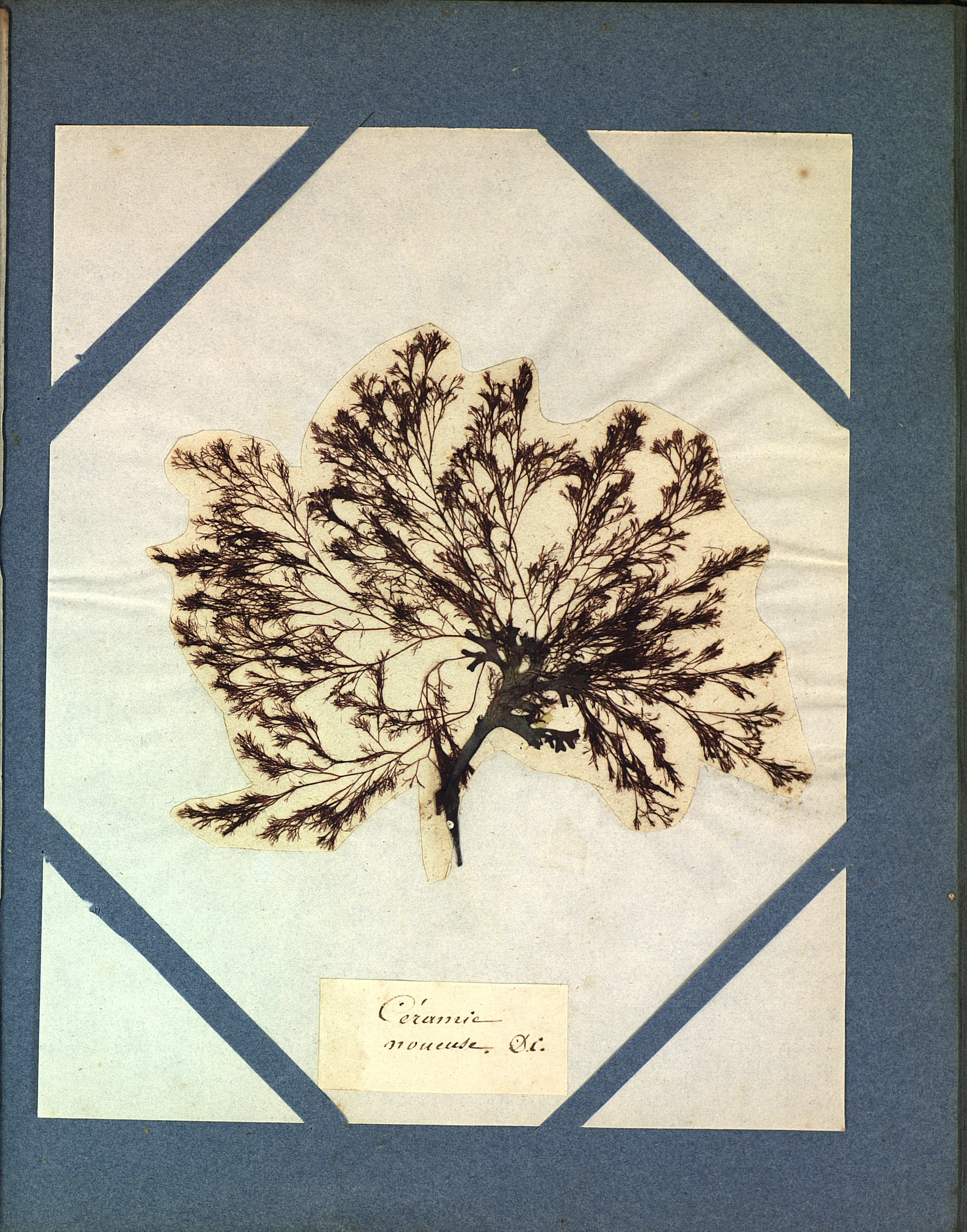

Scientific classification
- Clade: Archaeplastida
- Division: Rhodophyta
- Class: Florideophyceae
- Order: Ceramiales
- Family: Ceramiaceae
- Genus: Ceramium
- Species: C. nodulosum

Binomial name
- Ceramium nodulosum (Lightfoot) Ducluzeau

= Ceramium nodulosum =

Species of alga

Ceramium nodulosum is a small red marine alga. There is confusion surrounding this name.

== Description ==
Ceramium nodulosum is a small filamentous branching alga growing to a height of 30 cm in tufts of erect branches usually fully corticate. The apices of main axes are straight or slightly curled inward at the tips. It attached by a rhizoids with many erect branches. The axes and branches are usually fully corticate and, unlike some other species, it is without spines.

== Reproduction ==
Gametophytes are dioecious. Cystocarpes and tetrasporasngia are formed on the branches.

== Distribution ==
Generally found around Great Britain and Ireland.

== Nomenclature ==
There is some confusion with this name. As described above the species is Ceramium nodulosum (Lightfoot) Ducluzeae. The species Ceramium virgatum Roth is noted as a possible synonym elsewhere.
