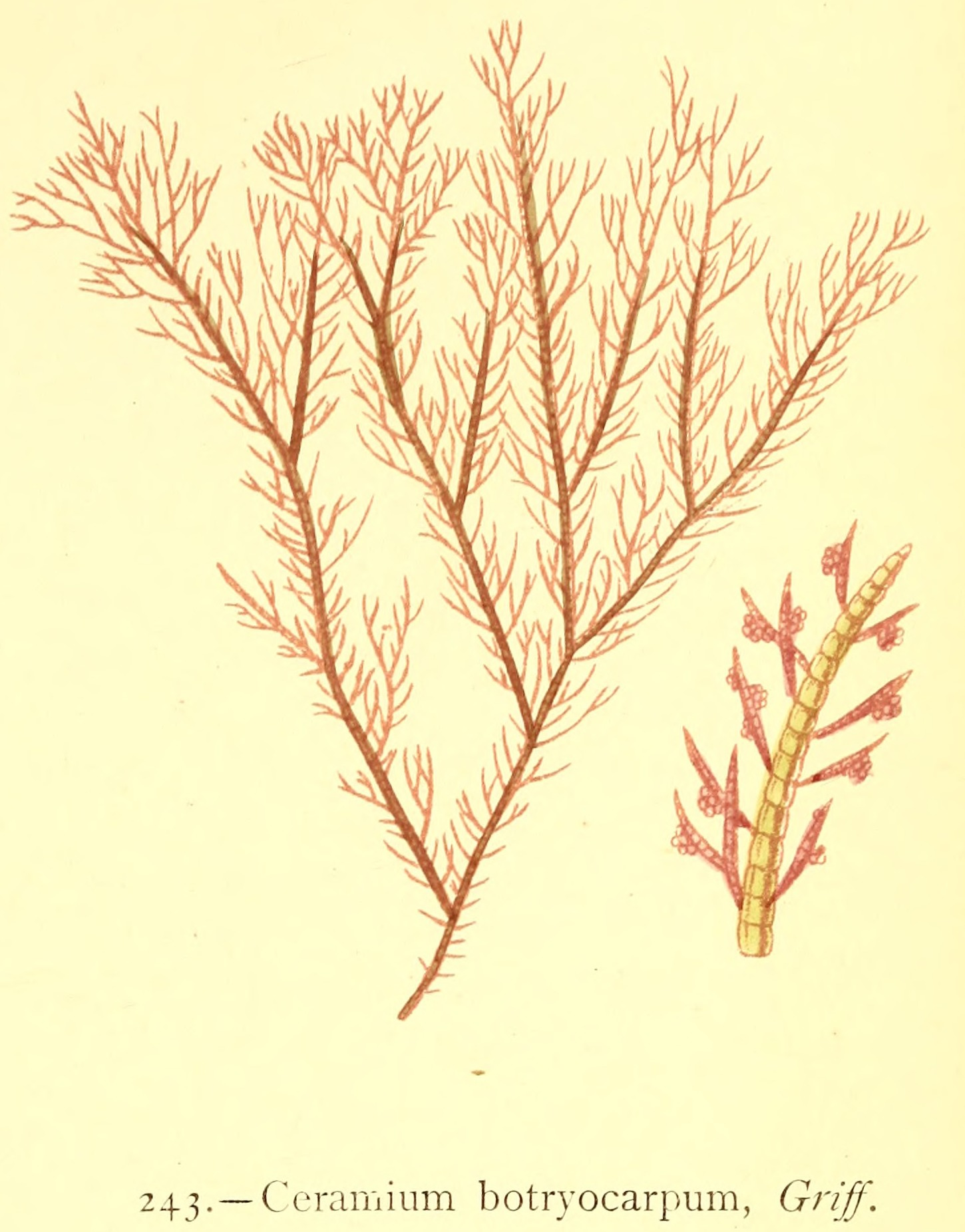

Scientific classification
- Domain: Eukaryota
- Clade: Archaeplastida
- Division: Rhodophyta
- Class: Florideophyceae
- Order: Ceramiales
- Family: Ceramiaceae
- Genus: Ceramium
- Species: C. botryocarpum

Binomial name
- Ceramium botryocarpum A.W.Griffiths ex Harvey

= Ceramium botryocarpum =

Species of alga

Ceramium botryocarpum is a small red marine alga in the Division Rhodophyta.

== Description ==
Ceramium botryocarpum is a small filamentous branched alga growing as tufts to a height of 12 cm. The axial branches consist of large barrel shaped cells, which branch irregularly dichotomously. The tips of the branches have strongly in inrolled apices. The axes are covered by small cells which form a complete cortex over the filaments. The axes appears banded due to the thinner covering of cortical cells at the internodes. Unlike certain other species of Ceramium it does not bear spines.

== Habitat ==
To be found in rock pools in the lower littoral. Epiphytic on other small algae where there are larger brown are not present.

== Distribution ==
Recorded from Ireland and Great Britain, but probably under-recorded. Also recorded from the Channel Isles and France.
