= Monosiphonous algae =

Monosiphonous algae are algae which consist of a single row of cells with, or without, cortication.

== See also ==
- Polysiphonous
