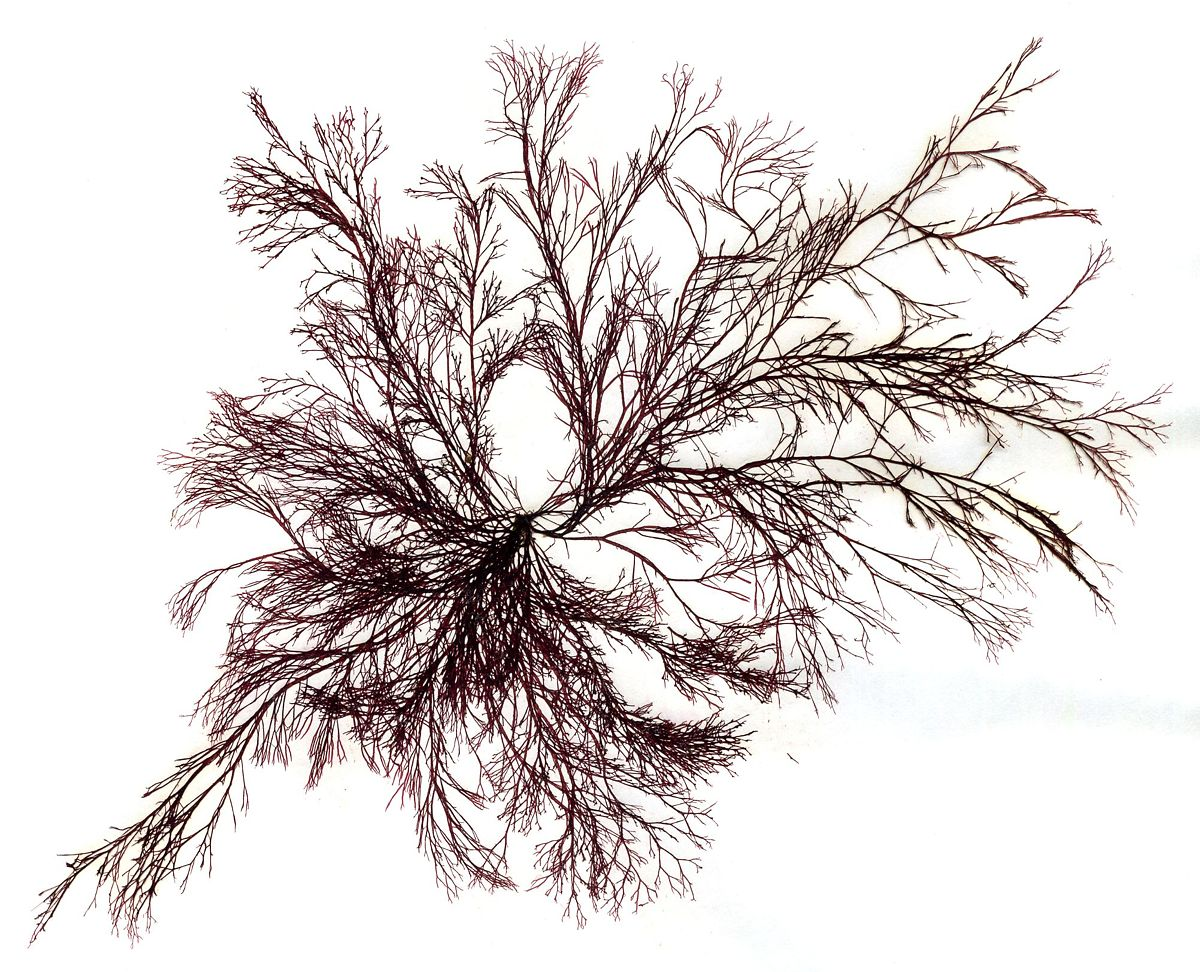
- Ceramium virgatum

Scientific classification
- Domain: Eukaryota
- Clade: Archaeplastida
- Division: Rhodophyta
- Class: Florideophyceae
- Order: Ceramiales
- Family: Ceramiaceae
- Genus: Ceramium; Blume

Species
- See list

= Ceramium =

Genus of algae

Ceramium is a genus of red algae (or Rhodophyta). It is a large genus with at least 15 species in the British Isles.

The fully corticated group previously referred to as Ceramium rubrum, an illegitimate name, is represented, in the British Isles by: Ceramium pallidum, Ceramium botryocarpum, Ceramium nodulosum and Ceramium secundatum.

== Description ==
All species of Ceramium are small algae growing to no more than 30 cm (12 in) in length. They consist of a terete monosiphonous axis of cells surrounded by smaller cells forming a cortex. In most species this a continuous cortex enclosing the axis, in others the cortical cells are arranged only in nodes at the junction of cells of the axes. The tips of the branches grow in a pincer-like manner. Species in the genus show irregular branching and are attached by unicellular or branched rhizoids.

== Reproduction ==
The species is dioecious forming spermatangia and carpogonia on separate male and female plants. The fertilised carpogonium develops growing parasitically attached to the female plant. Tetraspores are born in the cortical bands.

== Distribution ==
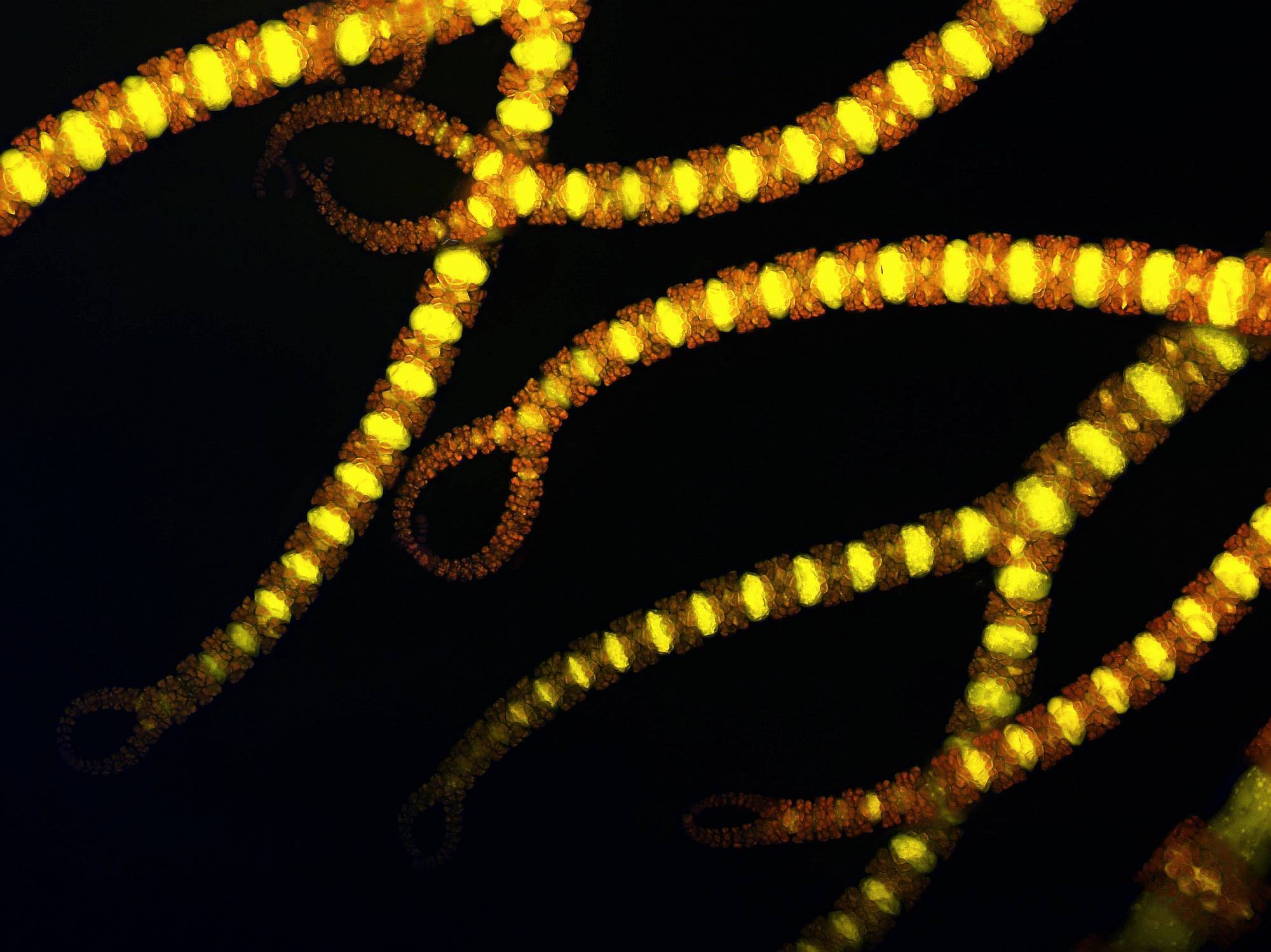
Ceramium tenuicorne under epifluorescence microscope

=== British Isles ===
Scotland: Orkney and Faroes, Shetland, Ross and Cromarty, Fife. England and Wales: Pembroke, Hampshire, Dorset, Devon and Cornwall, Sussex, Lincoln to Kent, Norfolk also the Channel Isles. Ireland: Cork, Kerry, Clare, Mayo, Waterford, Dublin, Donegal, Antrim and Down.

=== World ===
Some species are probably cosmopolitan. Widely in north-west Atlantic, Iceland, Norway to Spain, Denmark, Netherlands, France, Portugal, Mediterranean, Azores, Canary Islands, Cape Verde Islands, USA - Newfoundland to New York, Australia.
