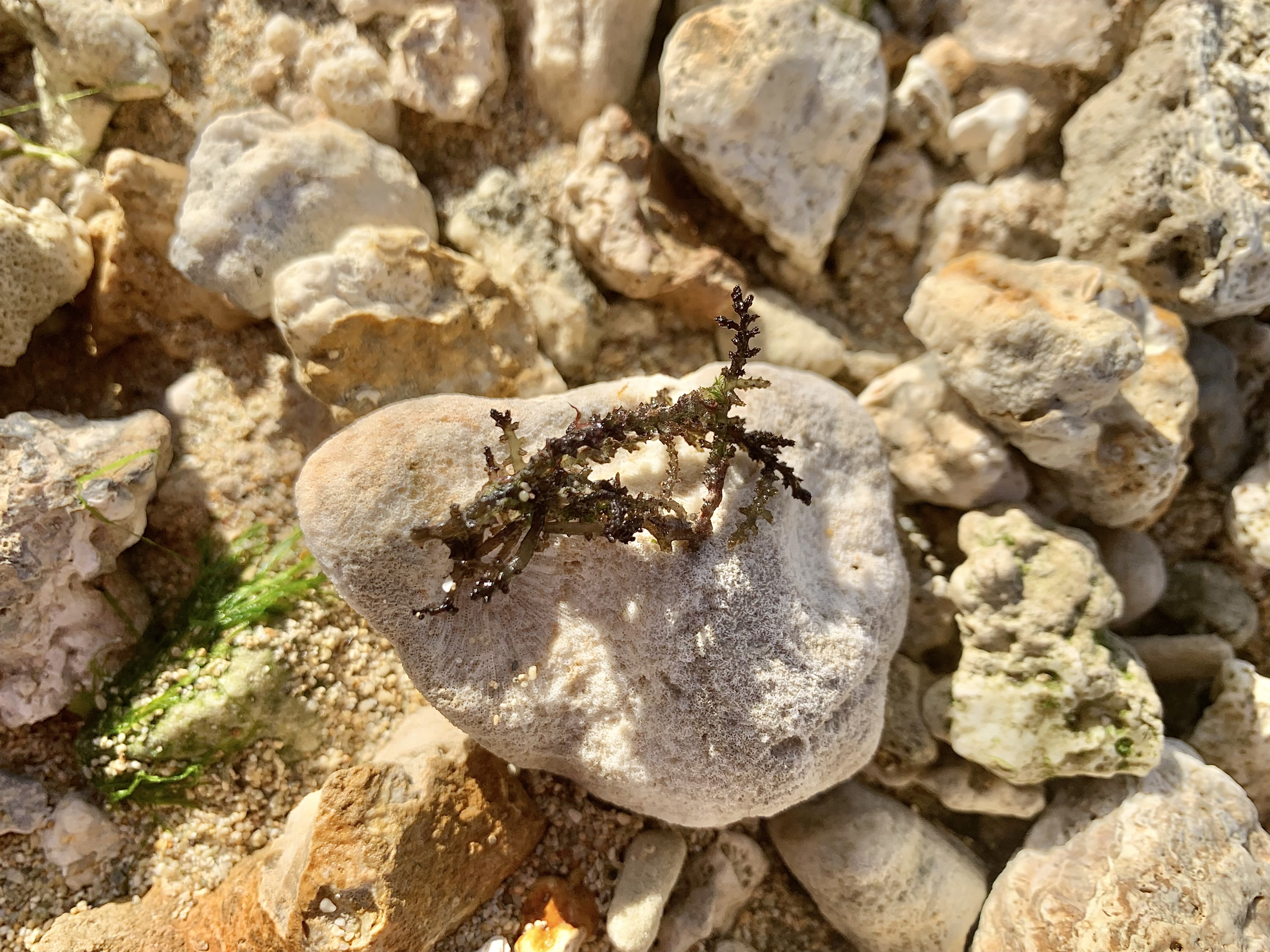
- Spiny algae (Acanthophora spicifera) at Waikiki Beach.

Scientific classification
- Domain: Eukaryota
- Clade: Archaeplastida
- Division: Rhodophyta
- Class: Florideophyceae
- Order: Ceramiales
- Family: Rhodomelaceae
- Genus: Acanthophora
- Species: A. spicifera

Binomial name
- Acanthophora spicifera (Vahl) Børgesen, 1910

= Acanthophora spicifera =

Species of alga

Acanthophora spicifera is a species of marine red algae in the family Rhodomelaceae.

== Distribution ==
The geographical distribution of Acanthophora spicifera includes:

- Guam
- Houtman Abrolhos
- Hawaii - non-indigenous. It was unintentionally introduced to Pearl Harbor, Hawai‘i from Guam in 1950 and has since become the most common nonindigenous algal species in the main Hawaiian Islands. On the west coast of Hawai‘i Island it has been documented at three sites, including Kaloko Fishpond in Kaloko-Honokohau National Historical Park, Pu'ukohola Heiau National Historic Site and Pu'uhonua o Honaunau National Historical Park.

== Ecology ==
Stegastes marginatus feeding outside its territory on tethered, invasive Acanthophora spicifera alongside Acanthurus nigrofuscus.

Acanthophora spicifera is one of the most common nonindigenous algal species in Hawaii and it displaces many native species where it is abundant.

The success of Acanthophora spicifera in invading benthic habitats is attributed to: (1) its ability to reproduce both sexually and vegetatively (by fragmentation); (2) successful epiphytism; and (3) its adaptability to a wide range of hydrological conditions. Rapid recolonization is probably due to the ability of Acanthophora spicifera to regrow from even small amounts of residual tissue and the high rate of reproduction.

Algal abundance is influenced by both nutrient availability and herbivory. The combination of high nutrient concentration and low herbivory, as in Kaloko Fishpond, promotes greater increases in algal abundance than an increase in nutrients alone. Herbivory, therefore, appears to play an important role in preventing tropical macroalgal growth.

Acanthophora spicifera is a palatable and highly preferred food for herbivorous fishes in Hawai‘i and has been found in the mouths of green sea turtles.

== Attempt to control ==
Acanthophora spicifera is a very difficult alga to eradicate, but controlling its spread and density may be feasible. A range of approaches was assessed to control this invasive alga in Kaloko Fishpond in Hawaii. Removal techniques were labor-intensive and had limited effect. All experiments showed a substantial initial decrease in algal density, but the long-term effect was minimal because of rapid regrowth. The most promising removal method was the use of submerged shelters to raise local densities of herbivorous fishes. Fishes grazed the alga and quickly reduced the biomass. However, the large number of predators and absence of topographical structure will make it challenging to provide sufficient shelters to increase the herbivorous fish population (biocontrol) in the entire fishpond.

== Medicinal properties ==
It has been proved by research workers that Acanthophora spicifera has significant cytotoxicity.
