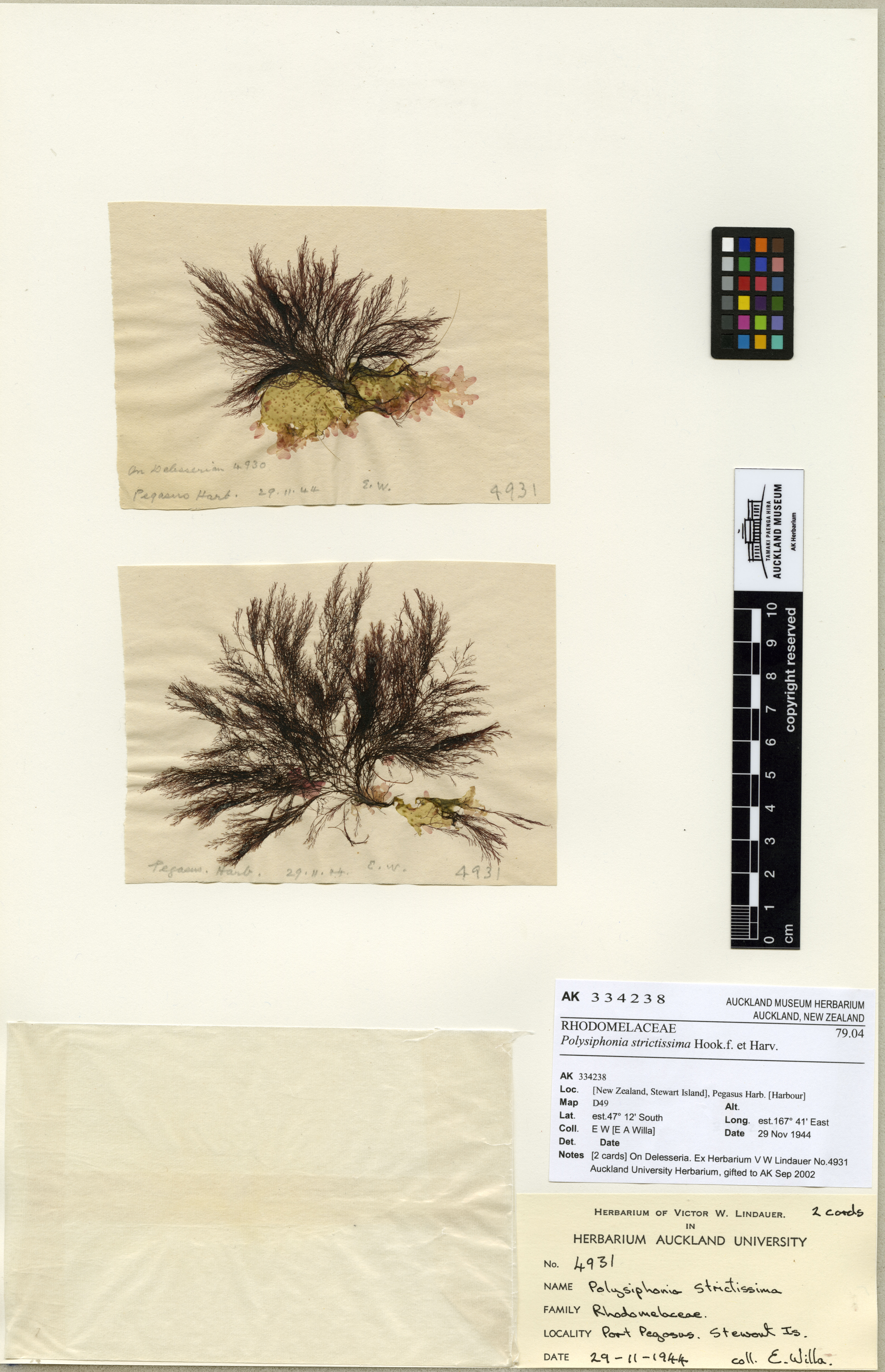

Scientific classification
- Domain: Eukaryota
- Clade: Archaeplastida
- Division: Rhodophyta
- Class: Florideophyceae
- Order: Ceramiales
- Family: Rhodomelaceae
- Genus: Melanothamnus
- Species: M. strictissimus

Binomial name
- Melanothamnus strictissimus (Hook.f. & Harv.) Diaz-Tapia & Maggs

= Melanothamnus strictissimus =

Species of red algae

Melanothamnus strictissimus is a species of red algae in the family Rhodomelaceae. It is a marine species native to New Zealand.
