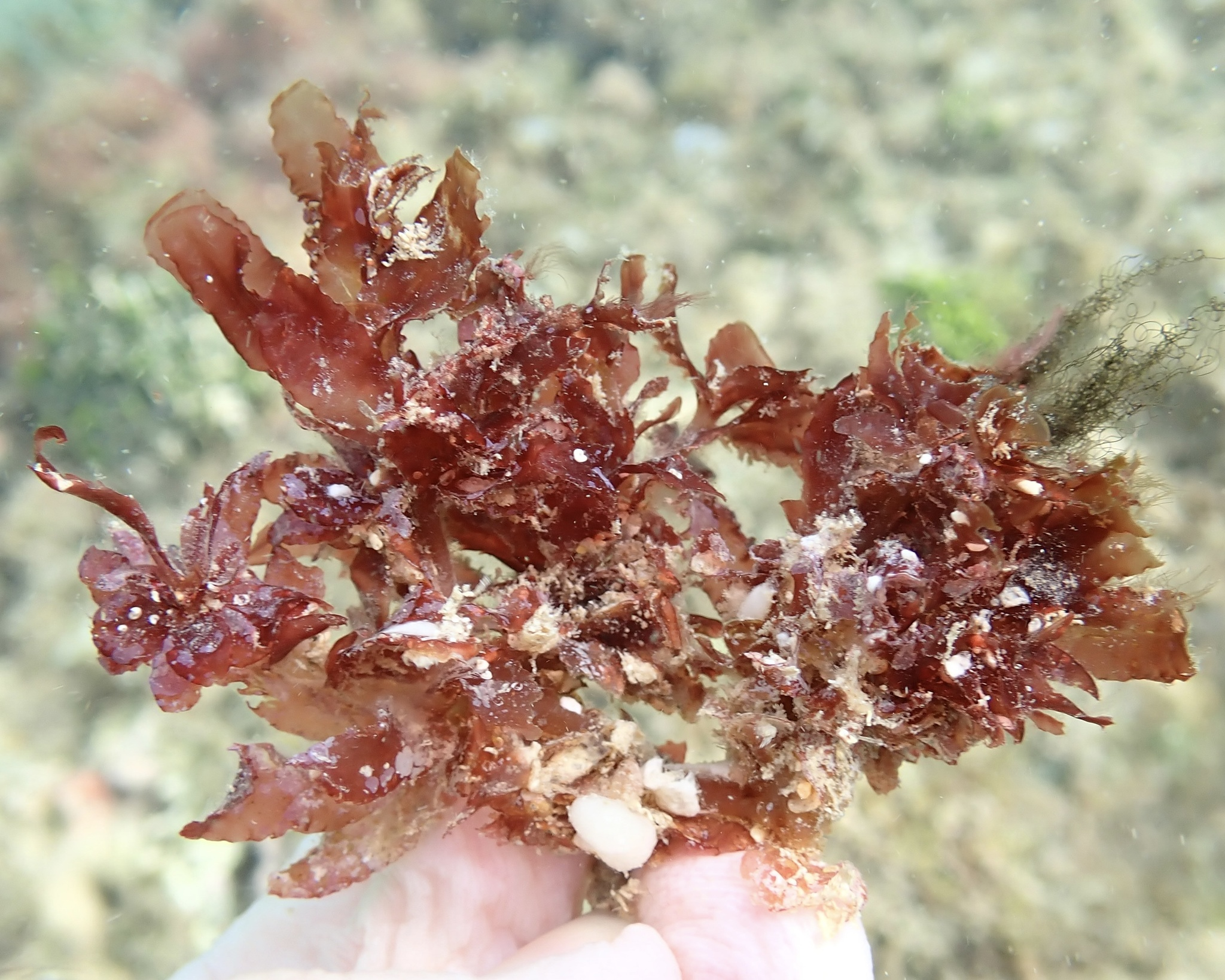

Scientific classification
- Clade: Archaeplastida
- Division: Rhodophyta
- Class: Florideophyceae
- Order: Ceramiales
- Family: Rhodomelaceae
- Genus: Amansia
- Species: A. glomerata

Binomial name
- Amansia glomerata C.Agardh

= Amansia glomerata =

Species of red algae

Amansia glomerata is a species of red algae in the family Rhodomelaceae, found in the Indo-Pacific.
