= Nancy Adams =

New Zealand botanical illustrator (1926–2007)

Nancy Adams CBE QSO
- Born: Jacqueline Nancy Mary Whittaker; 19 May 1926; Levin, New Zealand
- Died: 27 March 2007 (aged 80); Karori, Wellington, New Zealand
- Resting place: Karori Cemetery
- Citizenship: New Zealand
- Education: Wellington Girls College, Victoria University College
- Known for: botanical illustration, cultural heritage management, Seaweeds of New Zealand - An Illustrated Guide (1994)
- Awards: Loder Cup (1964), New Zealand 1990 Commemoration Medal (1990), Companion of the Queen's Service Order (1989), Commander of the Order of the British Empire (1996), Royal Society Te Apārangi 150 women in 150 words
- Scientific career
- Fields: botany, phycology, illustration
- Workplaces: Te Papa, DSIR
- Author abbrev. (botany): N.M.Adams

Jacqueline Nancy Mary Adams CBE QSO (19 May 1926 – 27 March 2007) was a New Zealand botanical illustrator, botanical collector, phycologist and museum curator. Throughout her career (1943–1987), she worked at DSIR and later at the Dominion Museum in different roles as technician, artist and assistant curator of botany. Largely self-taught, Adams collected over 3300 botanical specimens in New Zealand, illustrated nearly forty publications on algae and other native plants, and authored numerous scientific publications. Her major work, Seaweeds of New Zealand – An Illustrated Guide, was published in 1994.

== Early life ==
Nancy Adams was born in Levin on 19 May 1926, the daughter of Jessie Whittaker and her husband, Kenneth Ernest Adams (grandson of early amateur botanist James Adams).

Adams' parents separated while she was still young and she grew up in Wellington with her maternal grandparents, the proprietors of the Whittaker's chocolate company. From early in her life Adams displayed a strong interest in both plants and drawing: "Right from the time I was very small, I knew somebody did the plant drawings in books. That's what I wanted to do."

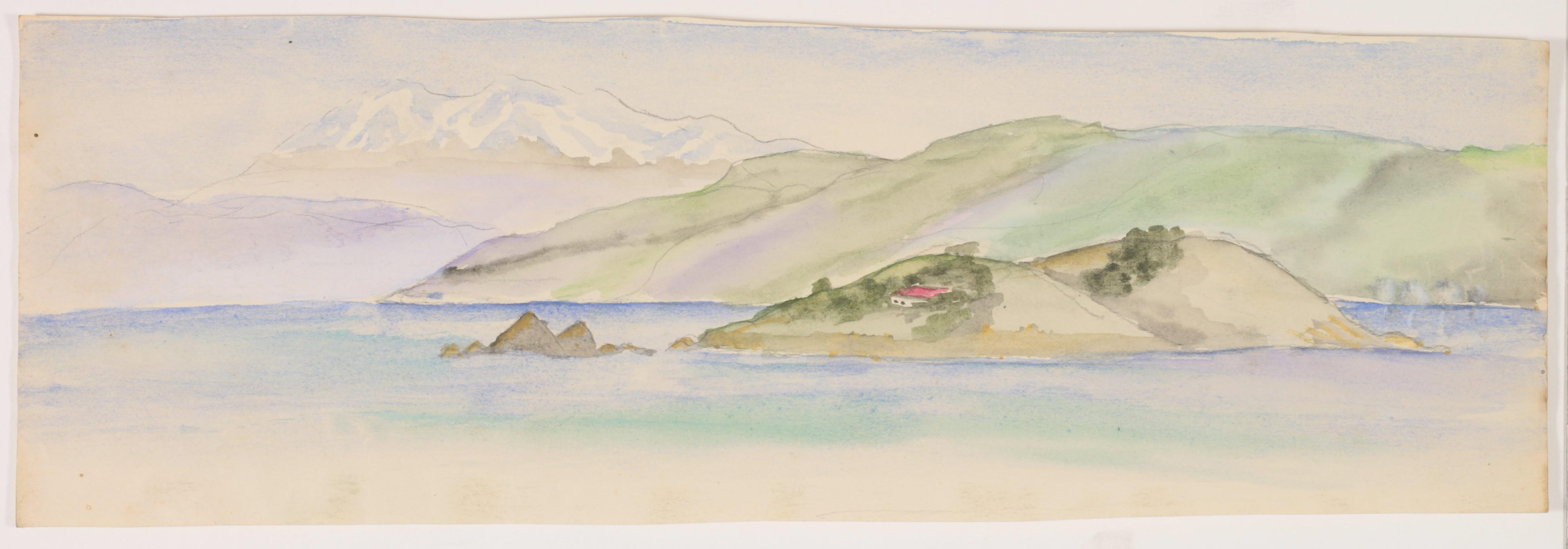
An early Adams watercolour (1935) of a small island in an inlet

Her interest was fostered at primary school, where her principal William Martin was an amateur botanist who taught students to draw from nature and took them on trips at Wellington Botanical Gardens. Adams attended Wellington Girls' College and Victoria University College, studying zoology and botany. Adams had no additional formal training in art or illustration, and due to ill health, she did not complete her university studies. She stated that she did not have any regrets around this, as on the job training was more beneficial. "Learning by doing is the best way. Things taught at university are not immediately applicable."

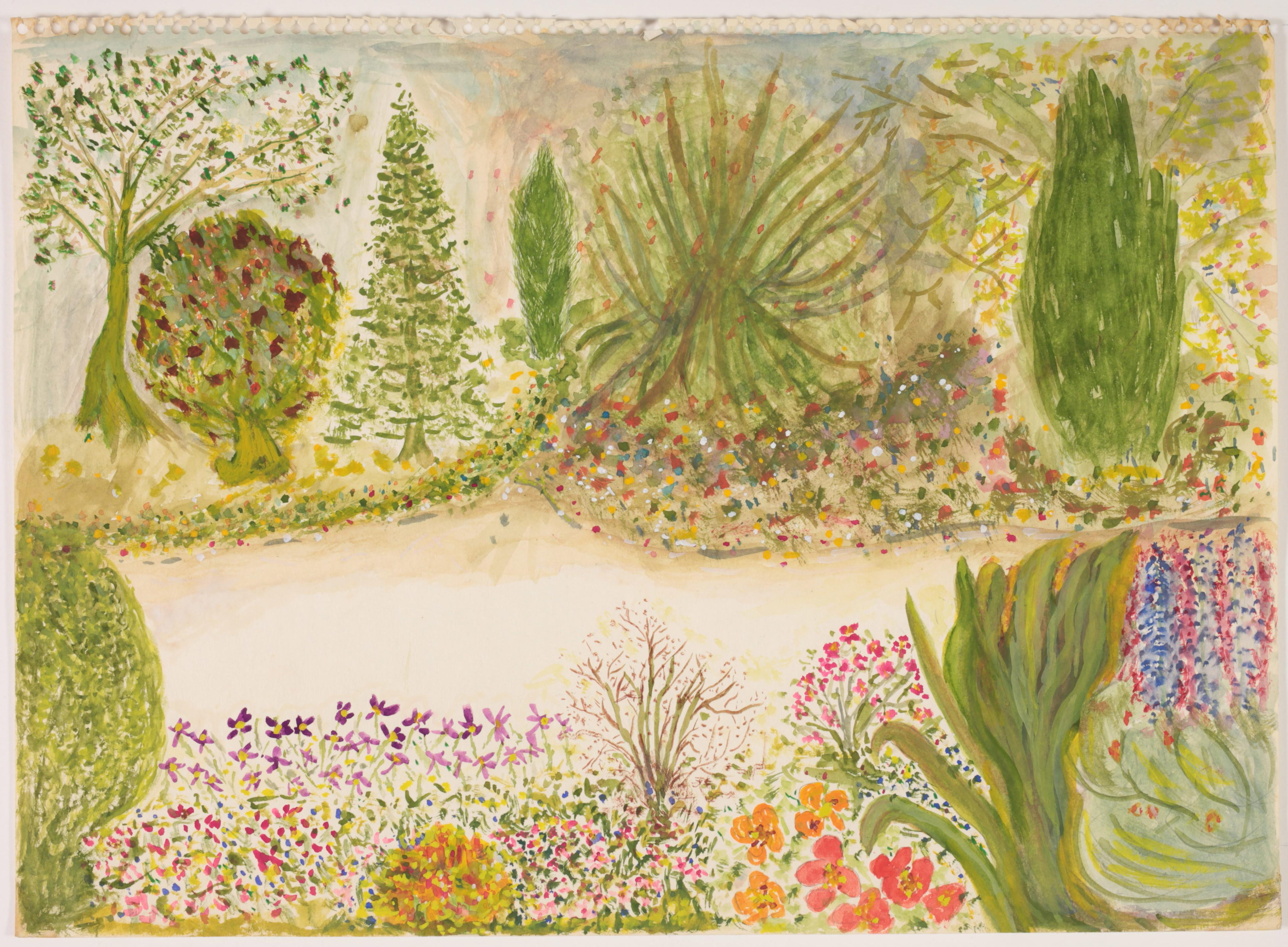
An early Adams watercolour of botanical garden scene (1938)

== Career ==
Adams joined the Botany Division of New Zealand's Department of Scientific and Industrial Research (DSIR) in Wellington as a technician in 1943 when she was 16 years old. The DSIR was looking for staff to replace men serving in World War II, allowing her to work closely on seaweeds with botanist Lucy Moore. At the time, most agar in the world was produced from red algae in Japan, so finding new sources of agar based on New Zealand algae was a priority, which Moore successfully accomplished in her research on the red alga Leptocladia. Adams also assisted Moore with another study of the reproductive biology of the brown alga Halopteris. Although she was not listed as a co-author on the resulting 1946 publication in Nature, Adams played a critical role in that research project by "examining hundreds of specimens and determining their reproductive characters." Adams handled and processed the many specimens of algae being sent to Moore at DSIR from across the country, including mounting, registering, labelling, identifying and illustrating the material. As technician, she learned by doing, increasing her knowledge of the New Zealand flora (especially algae) as well as her skills in collection management, specimen preparation, herbarium curation, and scientific illustration.

In 1948, Adams published her first botanical illustrations, which were of seaweeds for the New Zealand secondary school bulletin series, Post-Primary School Bulletin. She co-authored her first scientific paper in 1949 with Lucy Moore entitled, "Fruit Characters of Pittosporum dallii Cheesem.", which also contained her illustration of that endemic New Zealand tree. Adams was the DSIR Botany Division's botanical illustrator from 1950 to 1959, working on a wide variety of projects and plant groups, including algae, mosses, and flowering plants. Additional publications in the Post-Primary School Bulletin lead to the book, Plants of the New Zealand Coast, co-authored with Lucy Moore in 1963, which contained dozens of her illustrations of seaweeds, sand dune plants, and other coastal plants.

Adams was appointed to the Dominion Museum (now the Museum of New Zealand Te Papa Tongarewa) in 1959 as an artist, which was a highly varied role that included preparing exhibitions, and illustrating and registering collections ranging from natural history specimens to colonial furniture and costumes. Most of the botanical illustration work she did during her first decade at the museum was done on her own time, including the first edition of the popular book co-authored with Lindsay Poole, Trees and Shrubs of New Zealand, eleven guidebooks to national parks of New Zealand, and guidebooks to the New Zealand flora. In the summer of 1967–68, she went on "an ambitious caravan expedition from Fiordland to north-west Nelson" with Alan Mark and his family to perform field work for their book, New Zealand Alpine Plants, published in 1973, which contained 450 of Adams' watercolour illustrations that she painted from fresh material during the trip.

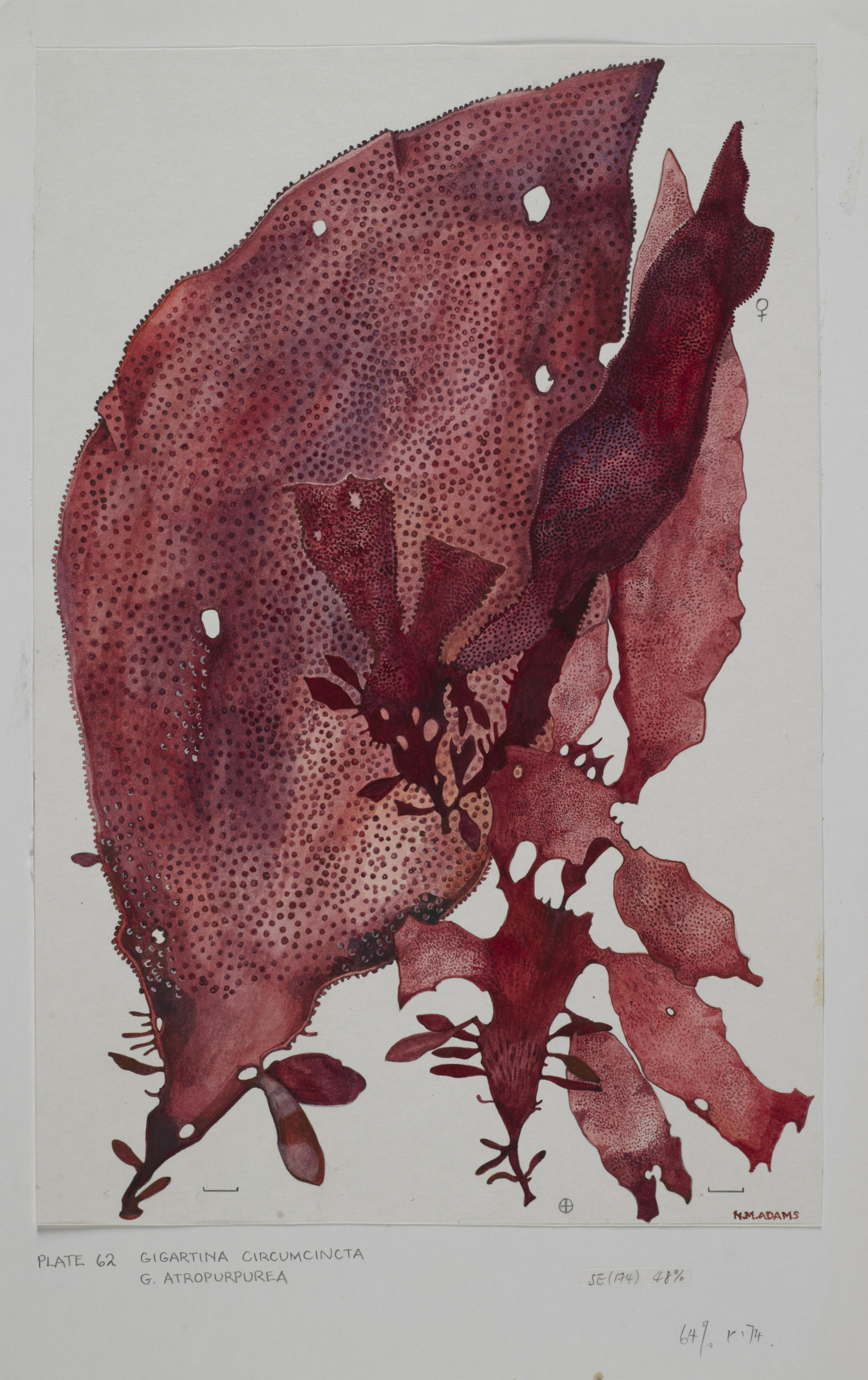
Adams watercolour illustration of the alga Gigartina in Plate 62 of Seaweeds of New Zealand (1994)

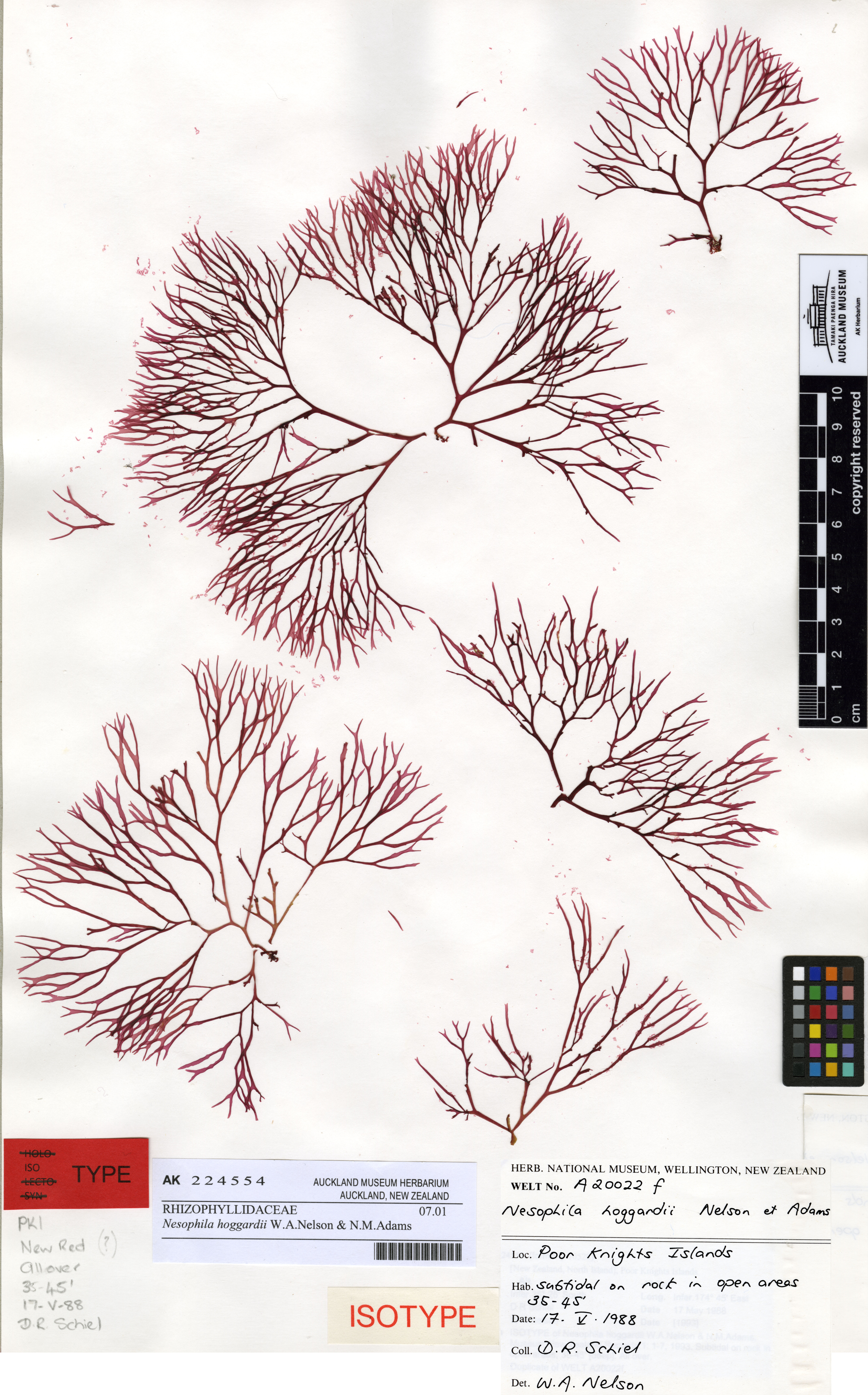
Isotype of the red algae Nesophila hoggardii which was described by Wendy Nelson and Nancy Adams

Finally in 1969, Adams became Assistant Curator of Botany with a special responsibility for algae. The vast majority of her approximately 3300 plant collections, which are housed at Te Papa, were collected in the following decade. Working alongside Curator Patrick Brownsey and technician Fiona Pitt, Adams was instrumental in both growing the botany collection at the museum as well as registering, organising, mounting and curating it. During her time at the museum, the algae collection went from about 1,000 specimens to 20,000, becoming a massive reference collection of indigenous marine algae, which provided fundamental knowledge for several regional checklists, floras and taxonomic revisions.

She retired from her position at the museum in 1987 but continued to be an Honorary Research Associate of the Museum. Her major work, Seaweeds of New Zealand – An Illustrated Guide, was published after her retirement in 1994, and was the first detailed flora of all macroalgae since 1855. The book was a 360-page monograph containing 116 of her colour plates, illustrating and describing about 75% of the estimated 800 species in New Zealand, from the Kermadec Islands in the north to the subantarctic islands in the south. Her book won the 1995 New Zealand Book Award for Book Production.

Adams was a prolific artist, illustrating nearly forty publications on native plants, alpine life, trees and shrubs. Included in these publications is an article written by Ella Orr Campbell, a fellow New Zealander, for whom Adams drew Thallus of Marchasta bearing archegoniophores. She received international recognition for her detailed and delicate algal illustrations.

Through her curatorial work at the Dominion Museum, Adams became very interested in the history of New Zealand botany and its botanists. She comprehensively researched a number of early New Zealand biologist, and published articles on James Adams, Bernard Aston, and especially fellow botanical illustrator, John Buchanan.

== Awards and honours ==
Awards included the Loder Cup in 1964 related to her publications for the National Parks, and the New Zealand 1990 Commemoration Medal. She was appointed a Companion of the Queen's Service Order for public services in the 1989 New Year Honours, and a Commander of the Order of the British Empire, for services to botany, in the 1996 New Year Honours. In 1994, she received an award for her work Seaweeds of New Zealand: An Illustrated Guide, which held a description of 600 different plant species and illustrating 441. She is a Royal Society Te Apārangi 150 women in 150 words laureate.

== Eponymy ==
The following two genera and four species of algae have been named after Nancy Adams:

- Adamsiella – a genus of red algae
- Nancythalia - a genus of red algae
- Lessonia adamsiae – a species of brown algae
- Lysithea adamsiae – a species of red algae
- Phycodrys adamsiae – a species of red algae
- Polysiphonia adamsiae – a species of red algae

== List of species named by Nancy Adams ==
- Antithamnionella adnata (J.Agardh) N.M.Adams
- Callophyllis angustifrons (Hook.f. & Harv.) South & N.M.Adams
- Erythrotrichia foliiformis South & N.M.Adams
- Nesophila hoggardii W.A.Nelson & N.M.Adams
- Plocamium microcladioides South & N.M.Adams
- Polysiphonia pernacola N.M.Adams
- Gigartina dilatata (Hook.f. & Harv.) N.M.Adams
- Chlidophyllon kaspar (W.A.Nelson & N.M.Adams) W.A.Nelson
- Halopteris virgata (Hook.f. & Harv.) N.M.Adams
- Streblocladia muelleriana (J.Agardh) L.E.Phillips, Hommers., N.M.Adams & W.A.Nelson

== Death ==
Nancy Adams died on 27 March 2007 in Karori, Wellington, New Zealand. She was 80 years old. Her botanical specimens and her archive, including original paintings, drawings, images and letters are at Te Papa. She is buried at Karori Cemetery.

== Gallery of botanical illustrations by Nancy Adams ==
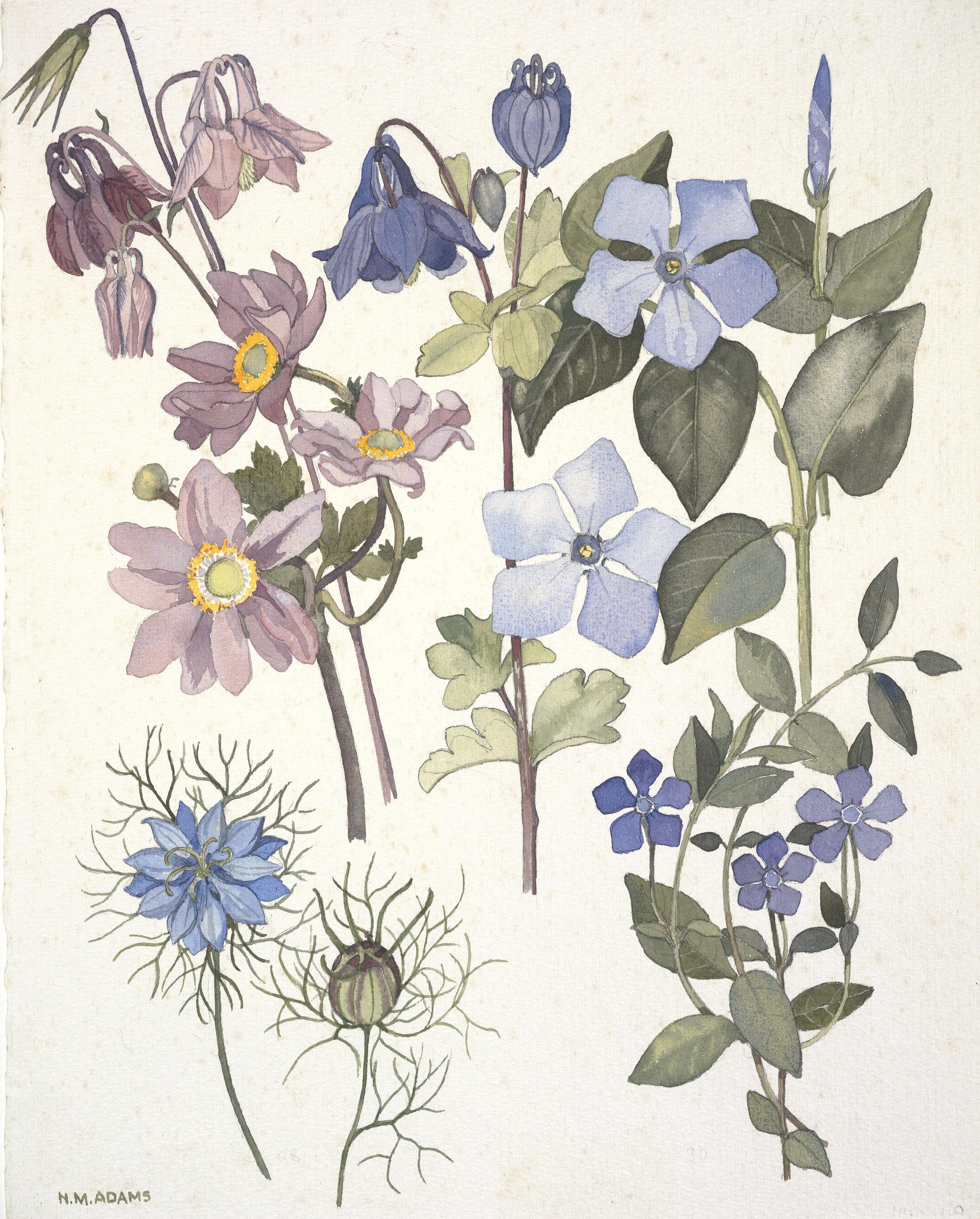
Plate 7 from Wild Flowers in New Zealand (1970)

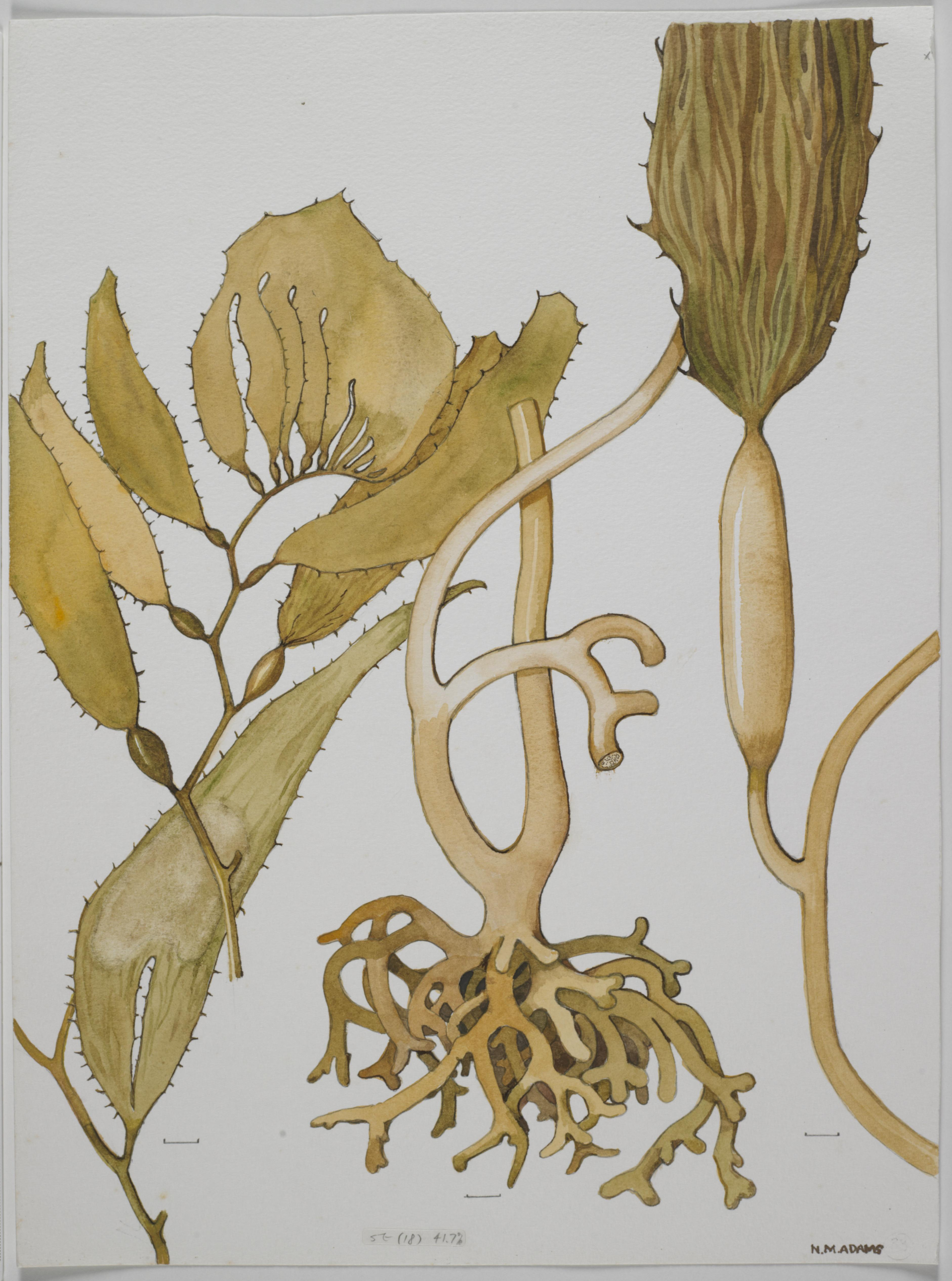
Seaweed watercolour (1989)

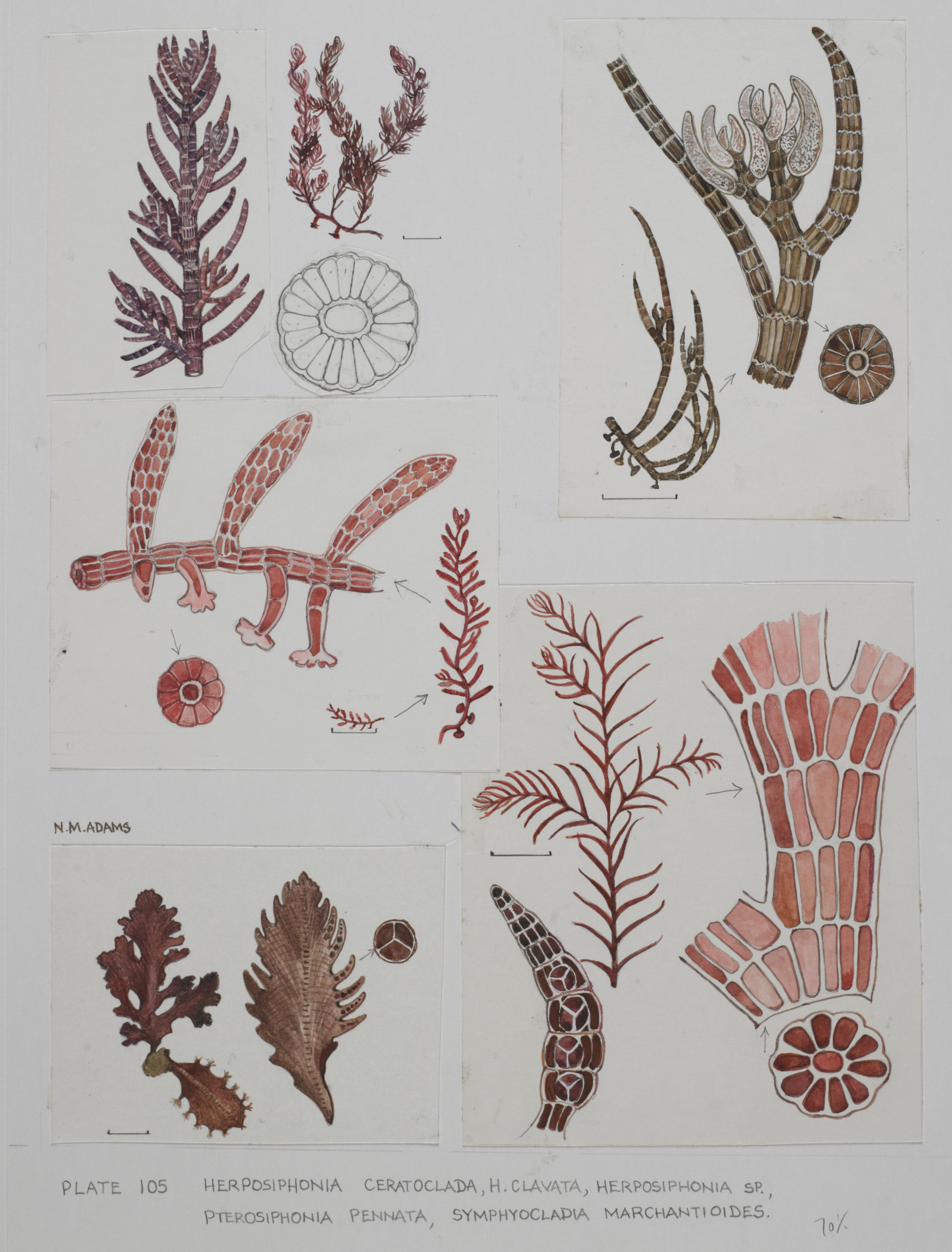
Plate 105 from Seaweeds of New Zealand (1994)

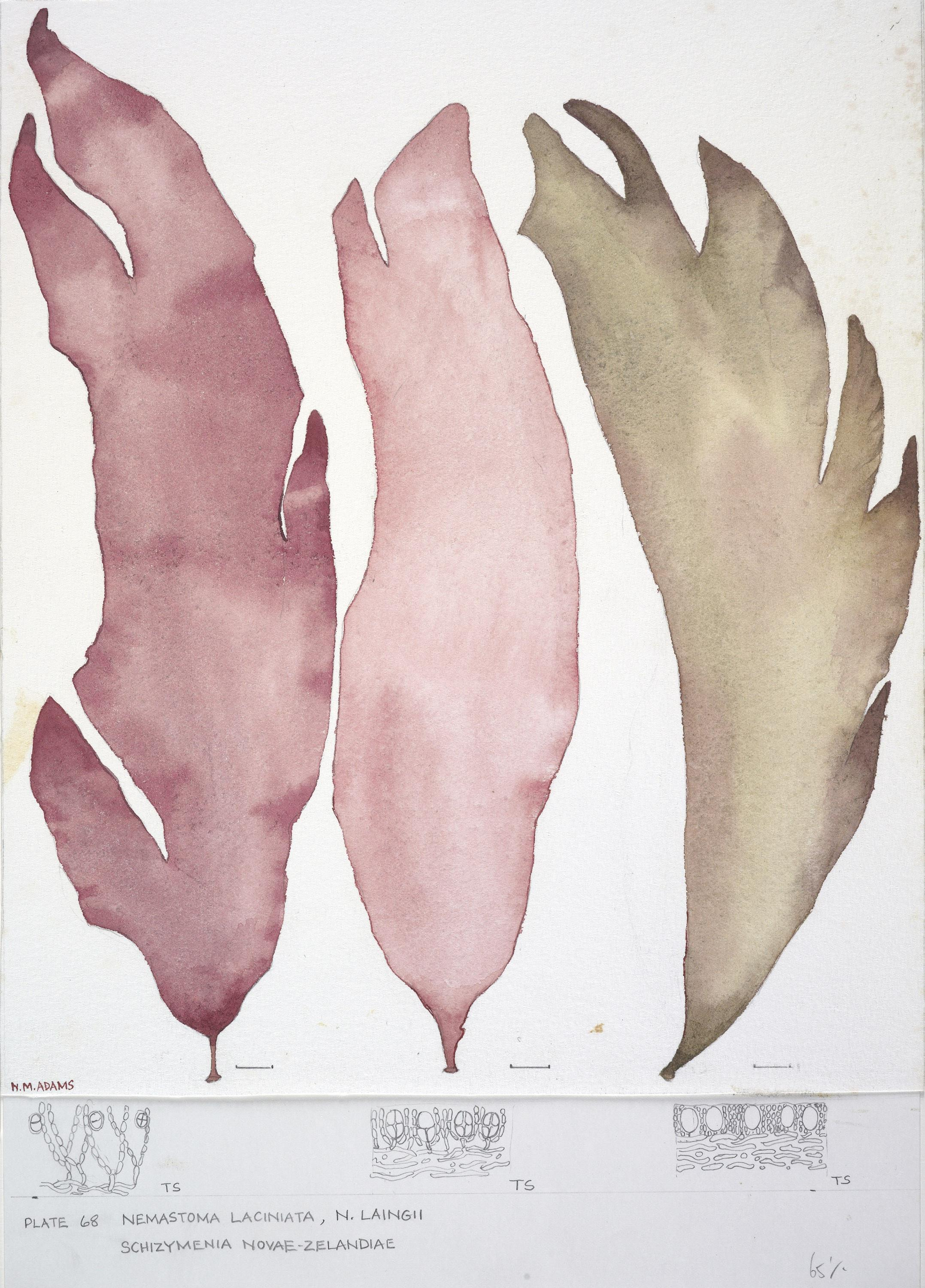
Plate 68 from Seaweeds of New Zealand (1994)

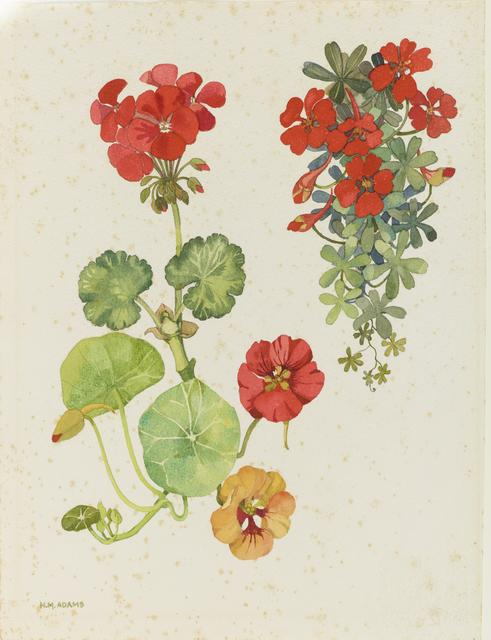
Plate 8 from Wild Flowers in New Zealand (1970)

== Bibliography ==
- Trees and shrubs of New Zealand, by A. L. Poole and Nancy M. Adams, 1963
- Mountain Flowers in New Zealand, 1980
- Wild Flowers in New Zealand, 1980
- Seaweeds of New Zealand: An illustrated guide, 1994
