= Harveyella =

Scientific classification
- Domain: Eukaryota
- Clade: Archaeplastida
- Division: Rhodophyta
- Class: Florideophyceae
- Order: Ceramiales
- Family: Rhodomelaceae
- Genus: Harveyella; F.Schmitz & Reinke, 1889

Species
- Harveyella mirabilis (Reinsch) F.Schmitz & Reinke

Genus of algae

Harveyella is a genus of red algae belonging to the family Rhodomelaceae.

The species of this genus are found in Europe and Northern America. It is one of the rare types of non-photosynthetic algae, as it lives by parasiting on other species of algae. It is generally colourless.

== Parasitism ==
It generally parasites on other red algae, such as Polysiphonia, and Odonthalia floccossa. Harveyella establishes connections with its host cells, using secondary pit connections that allow it to absorb nutrients from the host. After infecting, it can cause changes in the tissue structure of the host, like development of a thick pallisade layer of tissue. It's an example of an Alloparasite.
