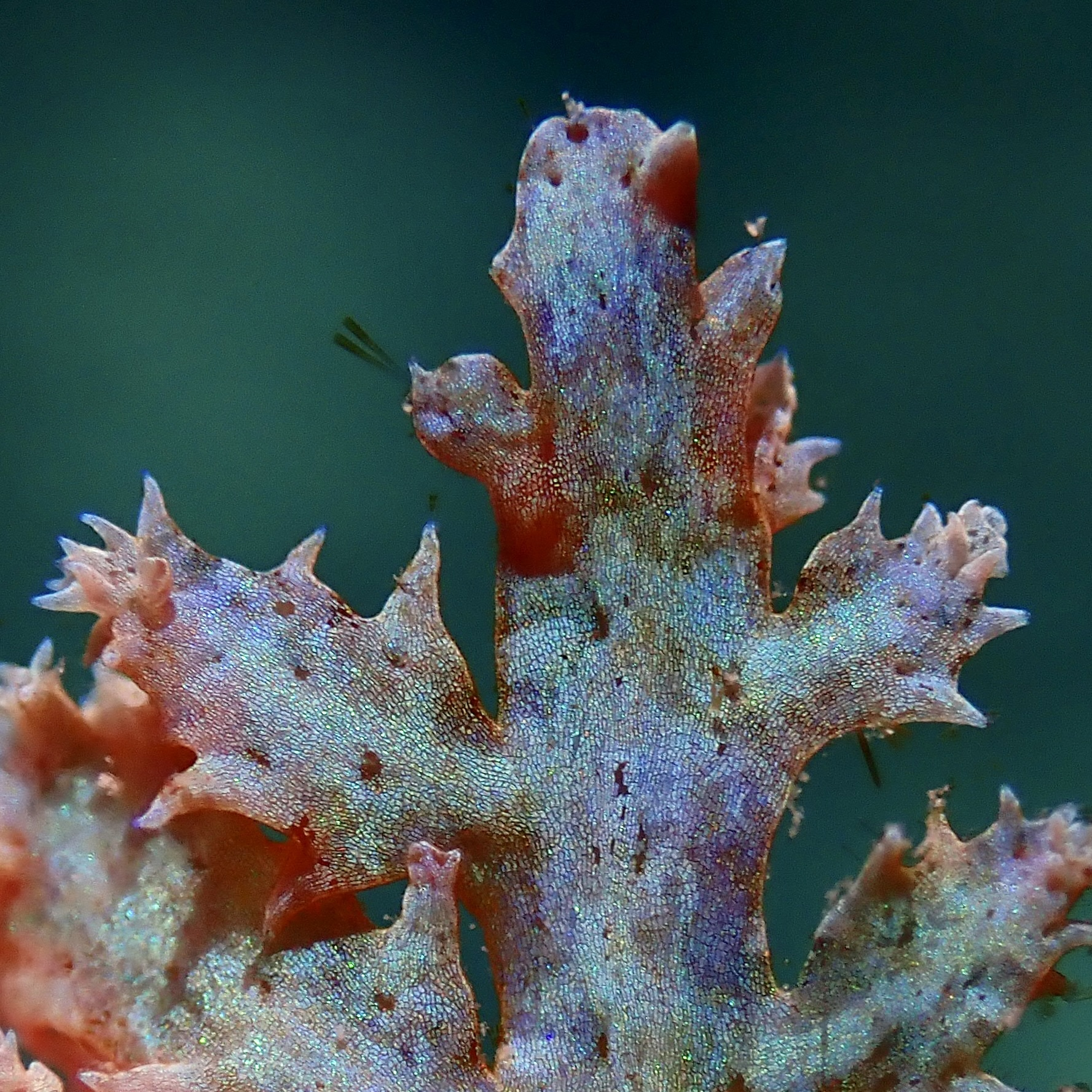

Scientific classification
- Domain: Eukaryota
- Clade: Archaeplastida
- Division: Rhodophyta
- Class: Florideophyceae
- Order: Ceramiales
- Family: Rhodomelaceae
- Genus: Acanthophora
- Species: A. pacifica

Binomial name
- Acanthophora pacifica (Setch.) Kraft, 1979

= Acanthophora pacifica =

Species of red alga

Acanthophora pacifica is a species of red algae in the family Rhodomelaceae, found in the tropical Indo-Pacific.

Acanthophora pacifica typically grows in low intertidal to subtidal zones, attaching to rocky substrates. This species is characterized by its flattened fronds with spinelike branches at the apices and an iridescent greenish-blue upper surface. It has been recorded in various locations across the Pacific, including the Philippines, French Polynesia, Fiji, Tahiti, and Hawaii. (Pg.355)

Description (Anatomy & Morphology)

Acanthophora pacifica has upright, flattened fronds with distinctive spinelike branches concentrated at the apices. In cross-section, its axes contain five pericentral cells, a trait it shares with the closely related genus Chondria. The species has a stoloniferous basal system, often forming clusters of plants. It can reach up to 10 cm in length. The upper surface of the fronds exhibits a bright greenish-blue iridescence, making it easily recognizable in marine environments. (Pg. 138)

Distribution & Habitat

This species is epilithic, attaching to rocky substrates in the low intertidal to subtidal zones. It thrives in warm tropical waters and is commonly found in the Indo-Pacific region. Low intertidal to 5m; on reef coral or basalt. (Pg.138)

Documented locations include the Philippines, French Polynesia, Fiji, and Tahiti, with its type locality recorded in Arue, Tahiti. It is also present in Hawaiian waters, where it occupies similar habitats. (Pg.355)
