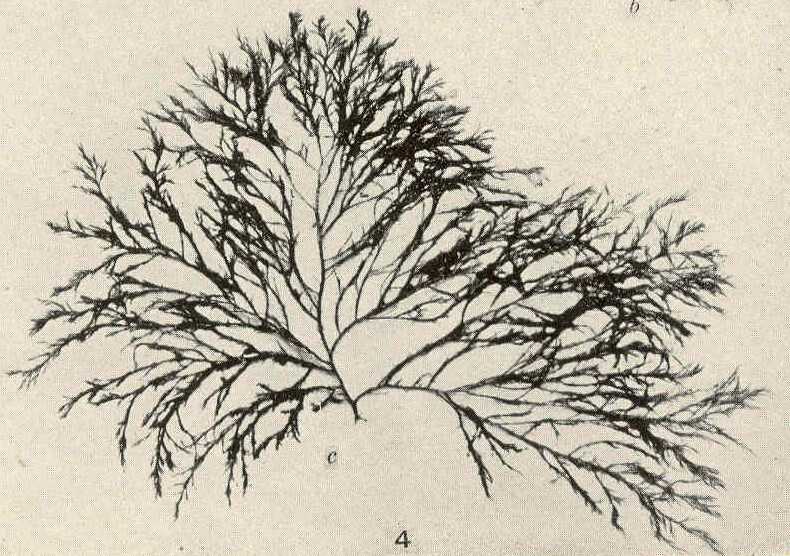

Scientific classification
- Clade: Archaeplastida
- Division: Rhodophyta
- Class: Florideophyceae
- Order: Ceramiales
- Family: Rhodomelaceae
- Genus: Melanothamnus
- Species: M. harveyi

Binomial name
- Melanothamnus harveyi (Bailey) Díaz-Tapia & Maggs

Synonyms
- Polysiphonia harveyi Bailey

= Melanothamnus harveyi =

Species of alga

Melanothamnus harveyi (Polysiphonia harveyi), Harvey's siphon weed, is a small marine red alga in the division of Rhodophyta.

== Description ==
Melanothamnus harveyi is a small marine alga which grows in tufts no more than 10 centimetres (3.9 in) high. The erect branches are formed by a central axis surrounded by four perecentral cells of the same length. A cortex may develop by cells growing downwards in the grooves between the perecentrals. Latteral branches are usually dense. The holdfast is a disk of downgrowing filaments from which further erect branches develop. The general appearance is very variable.

== Reproduction ==
This species is dioecious, meaning that individuals either have male or female reproductive systems. Spermatangial axes develop on trichoblasts. The cystocarps are globular borne on wide stalks. Tetrasporangia occur in series near the tips of the branches.

== Habitat ==
Melanothamnus harveyi grows epiphytically on other algae as well as on artificial material.

== Distribution ==
This species can be found in England, Scotland, Ireland, Norway, France, Denmark and the east coast of North America.
