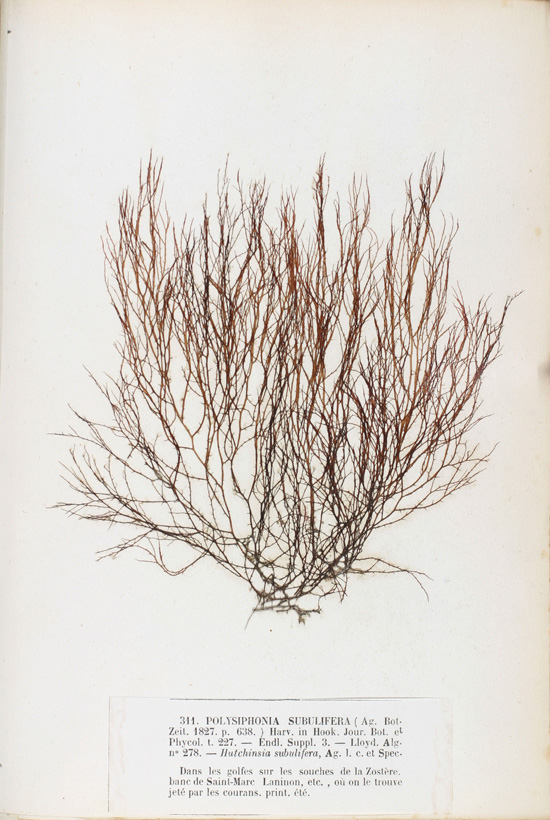

Scientific classification
- Clade: Archaeplastida
- Division: Rhodophyta
- Class: Florideophyceae
- Order: Ceramiales
- Family: Rhodomelaceae
- Genus: Vertebrata
- Species: V. subulifera

Binomial name
- Vertebrata subulifera (C.Agardh) Kuntze

Synonyms
- Hutchinsia subulifera C.Agardh; Polysiphonia subulifera (C. Agardh) Harvey

= Vertebrata subulifera =

Species of alga

Vertebrata subulifera (Polysiphonia subulifera (C.Agardh) Harvey) is a small marine alga in the division Rhodophyta.

== Description ==
This alga consists of branched thalli growing to a length of 20 cm. It grows as tufts of very branched axes attached by rhizoids. A main branch is absent. In section the main branches can be seen to be composed of a central axis with 12 pericentral cells all of equal length. Trichoblasts are abundant.

Similar to Vertebrata fruticulosa (Boergeseniella fruticulosa) which it is distinguished by small corticated cells.

== Habitat ==
Growing on the seashore on pebbles and other surfaces at the very low water.

== Distribution ==
Ireland, Great Britain and north-west France.
