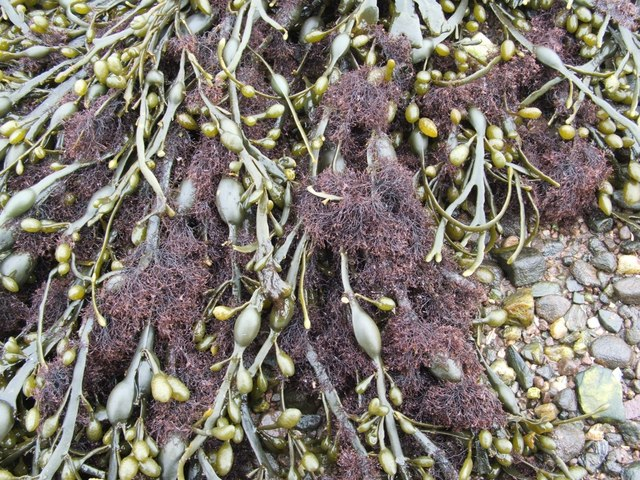
- Brown algae Ascophyllum_nodosum with hemi-parasitic red algae Vertebrata lanosa (Polysiphonia lanosa)

Scientific classification
- Clade: Archaeplastida
- Division: Rhodophyta
- Class: Florideophyceae
- Order: Ceramiales
- Family: Rhodomelaceae
- Genus: Polysiphonia
- Species: P. lanosa

Binomial name
- Polysiphonia lanosa (L.) Tandy

= Polysiphonia lanosa =

Species of alga

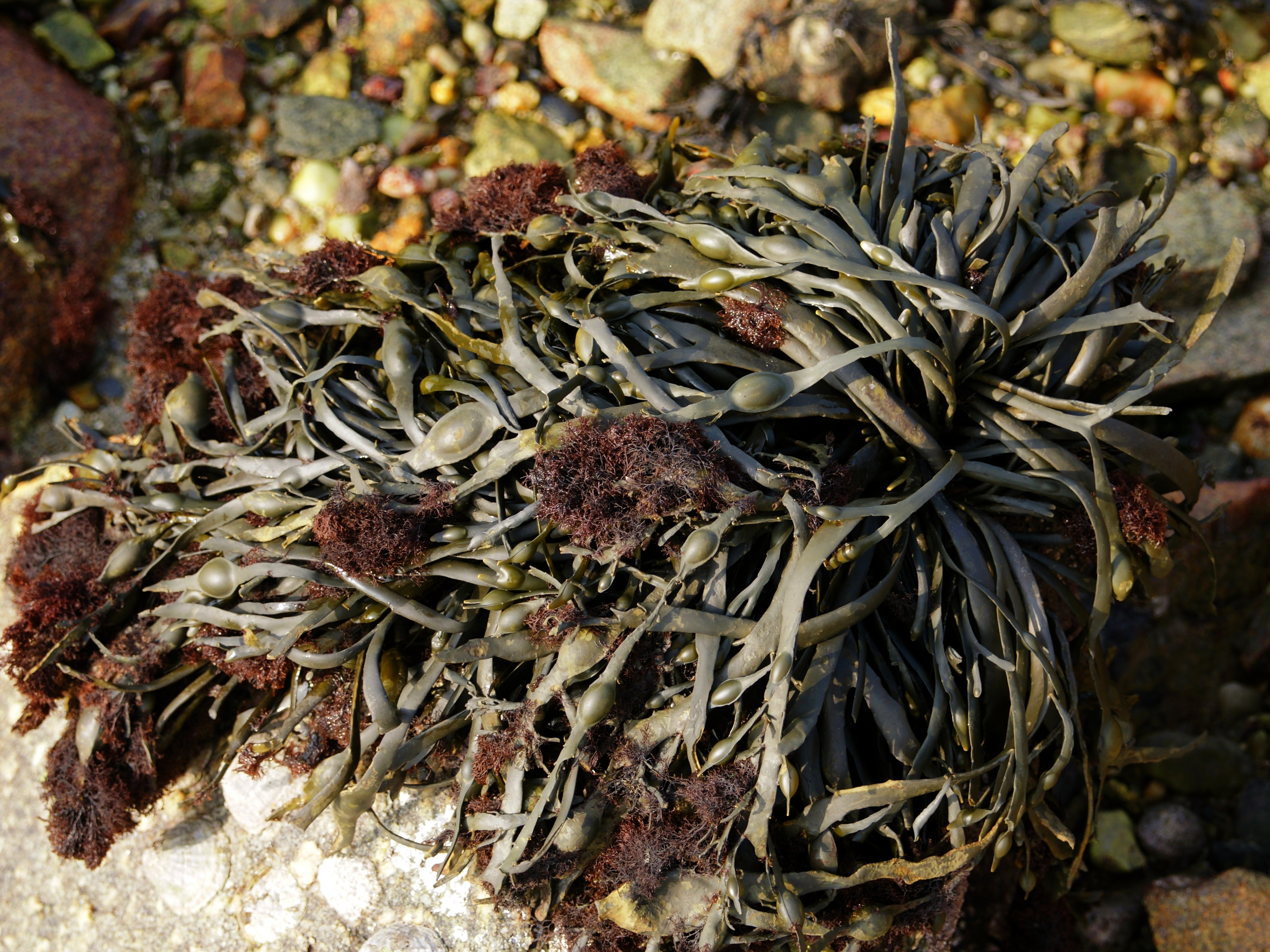
Vertebrata lanosa on Ascophyllum nodosum

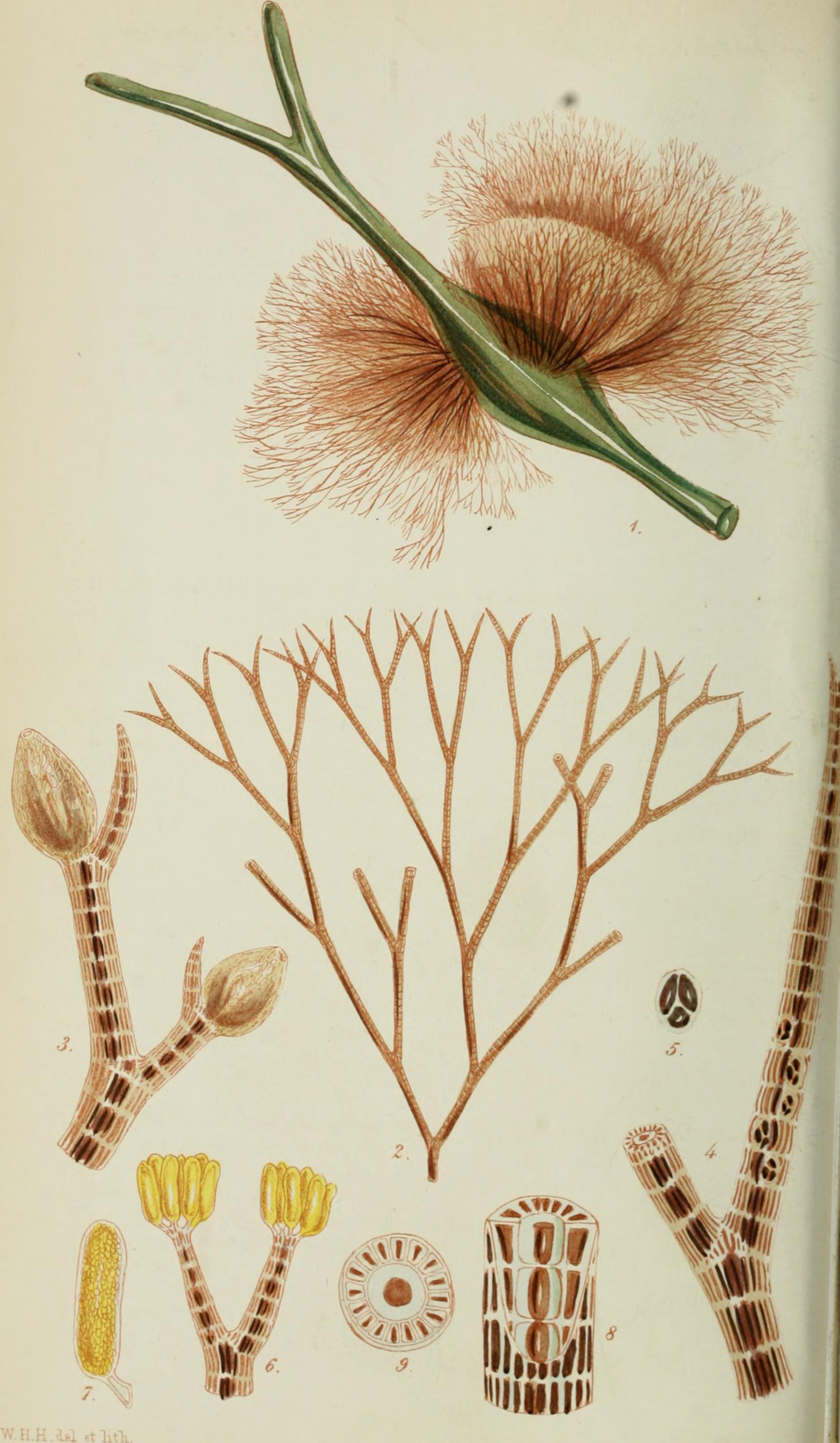
1 tufts growing on Ascophyllum nodosum; 2 portion of a frond; 3 ceramidia = cystocarps; 4 branchlet with embedded tetraspores; 5 tetraspore; 6 apices with antheridia; 7 antheridium; 8 portion of a frond, partly cut longitudinally; 9 transverse section of a frond

Polysiphonia lanosa (Vertebrata lanosa; Polysiphonia fastigiata) is a common species of the red algae (Rhodophyta) often to be found growing on Ascophyllum nodosum.

== Description ==
The thalli of this species form dense tufts, each tuft up to 7.5 cm generally attached by rhizoids to the fronds of Ascophyllum. The erect cylindrical branches divide pseudodichotomously, that is forming two equal branches, one of the branches growing from a lateral branch. A transverse section shows an axial cell surrounded by 12 to 24 peraxial cells. The axial cell is large and occupies about one third of the diameter of each branch, best seen in transverse section. It is deep brownish red in colour.

Choreocolax polysiphoniae is a small parasitic alga which grows in a cushion-like manner to 1 mm in diameter on the branches of P. lanosa.

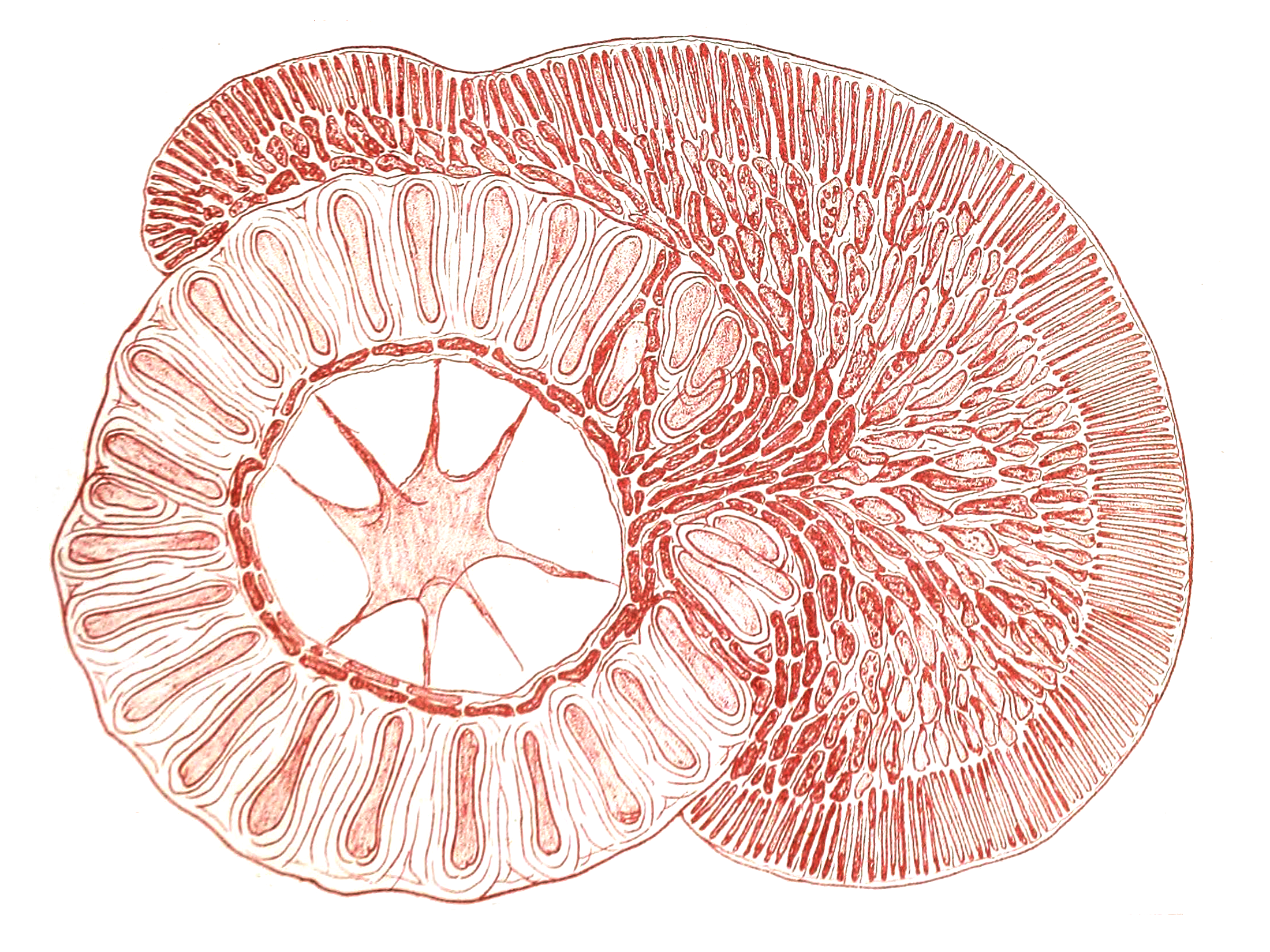
Cross section of allopatric parasitic red algae Choreocolax polysiphoniae on epiphytic red algae Vertebrata lanosa (=Polysiphonia fastigiata)

== Habitat ==
Widespread growing epiphytically on Ascophyllum nodosum wherever it is found and occasionally on other species of Fucus.

== Reproduction ==
The life history is a sequence of three phases: gametangial, carposporangial and tetrasporangial. Two of the phases are similar. The plants are dioecious with spermatangial branches produced in tufts at the apices of the branches. The cystocarps are borne, usually singly. with a narrow ostiole from which carpospores are released. The tetraspores occur in spiral series resulting from a simultaneous division into 4 equal spores.

== Distribution ==
Common around the British Isles and on the shores of Europe from Iceland, Norway to Spain. Also Greenland and Newfoundland to New England.
