= Melanothamnus =

Scientific classification
- Clade: Archaeplastida
- Division: Rhodophyta
- Class: Florideophyceae
- Order: Ceramiales
- Family: Rhodomelaceae
- Genus: Melanothamnus; Bornet & Falkenberg, 1901

Genus of algae

Melanothamnus is a genus of red algae belonging to the family Rhodomelaceae.

The genus has cosmopolitan distribution.

Species:

- Melanothamnus collabens (C.Agardh) Díaz-Tapia & Maggs
- Melanothamnus harveyi (Bailey) Díaz-Tapia & Maggs
- Melanothamnus maniticola
- Melanothamnus sphaerocarpus (Børgesen) Díaz-Tapia & Maggs
- Melanothamnus strictissimus (Hook.f. & Harv.) Diaz-Tapia & Maggs
