= Vidalia (alga) =

Scientific classification
- Clade: Archaeplastida
- Division: Rhodophyta
- Class: Florideophyceae
- Order: Ceramiales
- Family: Rhodomelaceae
- Genus: Vidalia; J. V. F. Lamouroux ex J.Agardh, 1863

Type species
- Vidalia spiralis (Lamouroux) Lamouroux ex J.Agardh

Species
- See text

Genus of algae

Vidalia is a tropical red algae genus in the family Rhodomelaceae.

Vidalenolone is a phenolic compound that can be found in the genus Vidalia .

== Species ==
- Vidalia cliftonii Harvey S
- Vidalia colensoi (J.D.Hooker & Harvey) J.Agardh P
- Vidalia daemeliana Sonder P
- Vidalia daemelii Sonder S
- Vidalia fimbriata var. neocaledonica Grunow ex Falkenber P
- Vidalia fimbriata (Lamouroux) J.Agardh S
- Vidalia gregaria Falkenberg S
- Vidalia intermedia J.Agardh S
- Vidalia kuetzingioides (Harvey) J.Agardh P
- Vidalia melvillii (J.Agardh) F.Schmitz S
- Vidalia obtusiloba (Mertens ex C.Agardh) J.Agardh S
- Vidalia pumila Sonder S
- Vidalia serrata (Suhr) J.Agardh S
- Vidalia spiralis (Lamouroux) Lamouroux ex J.Agardh C - type
- Vidalia volubilis (Linnaeus) J.Agardh S
