= Waputikia =

Waputikia Temporal range: Middle Cambrian, Burgess Shale

Scientific classification
- Domain: Eukaryota
- Supergroup: Archaeplastida
- Division: Rhodophyta
- Class: Florideophyceae
- Order: Ceramiales
- Family: Rhodomelaceae
- Genus: †Waputikia; C.Walcott
- Species: †W. ramosa

Binomial name
- †Waputikia ramosa Walcott

Extinct genus of algae

Waputikia is a red alga of the middle Cambrian Burgess Shale. It comprises a main stem about 1 cm across, with the longest recovered fossil 6 cm in length. Branches of a similar diameter emerge from the side of the main branch, then rapidly bifurcate to much finer widths. The fossils are smooth and shiny; no internal structure can be recognised. 10 specimens of Waputikia are known from the Greater Phyllopod bed, where they comprise < 0.1% of the community.
