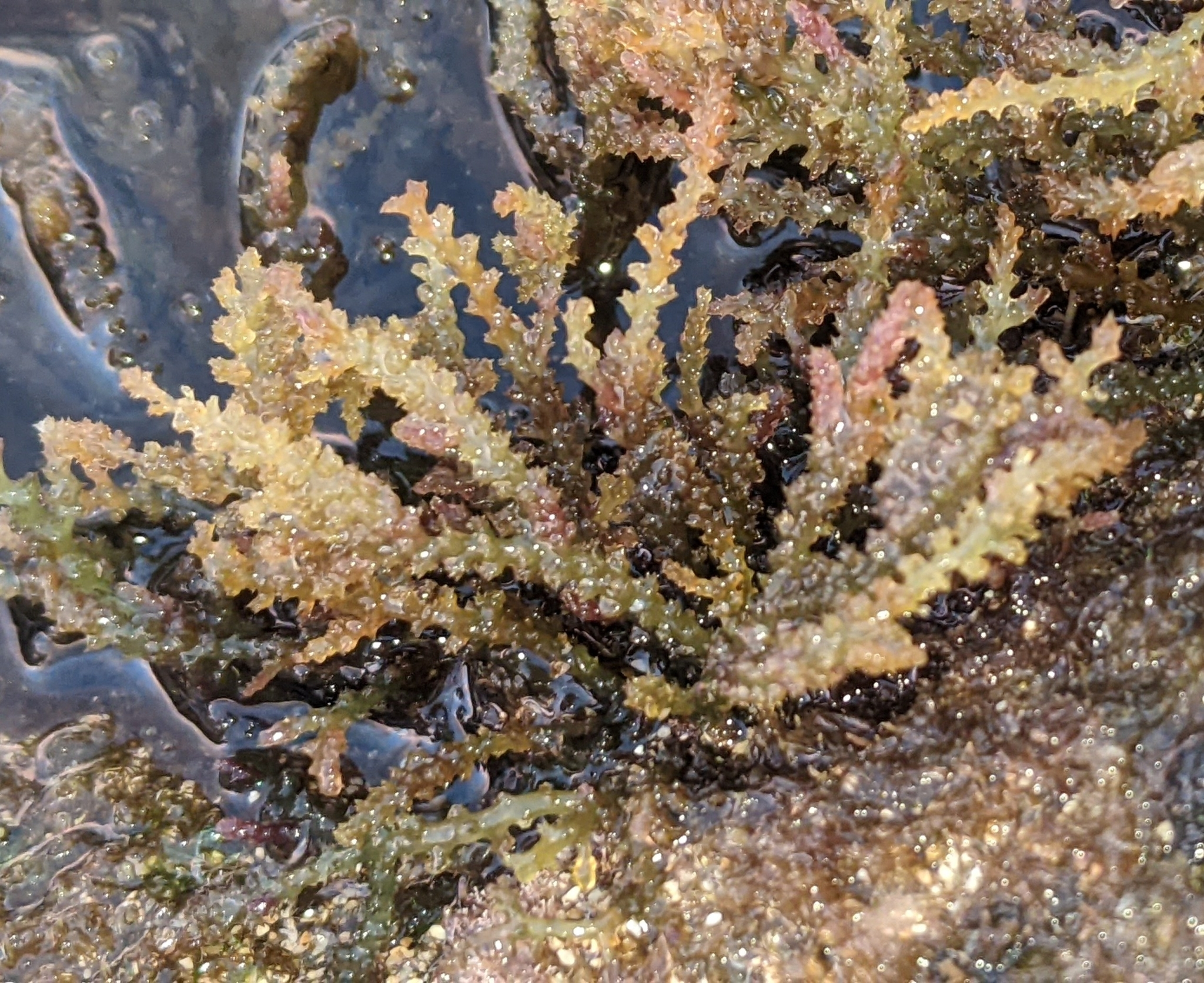
- Acanthophora spicifera

Scientific classification
- Clade: Archaeplastida
- Division: Rhodophyta
- Class: Florideophyceae
- Order: Ceramiales
- Family: Rhodomelaceae
- Genus: Acanthophora; J. V. F. Lamouroux

= Acanthophora =

Genus of algae

Acanthophora is also a synonym for Aralia. For the section of Solanum, see Solanum sect. Acanthophora.

Acanthophora is a genus of marine red algae in the family Rhodomelaceae.There are 26 species (and infraspecific) names in the AlgaeBase database at present, of which 7 have been flagged as currently accepted taxonomically.

== Species ==
Species in the genus Acanthophora include:

- Acanthophora dendroides
- Acanthophora spicifera
- Acanthophora aokii
- Acanthophora muscoides
- Acanthophora nayadiformis
- Acanthophora pacifica
- Acanthophora ramulosa
