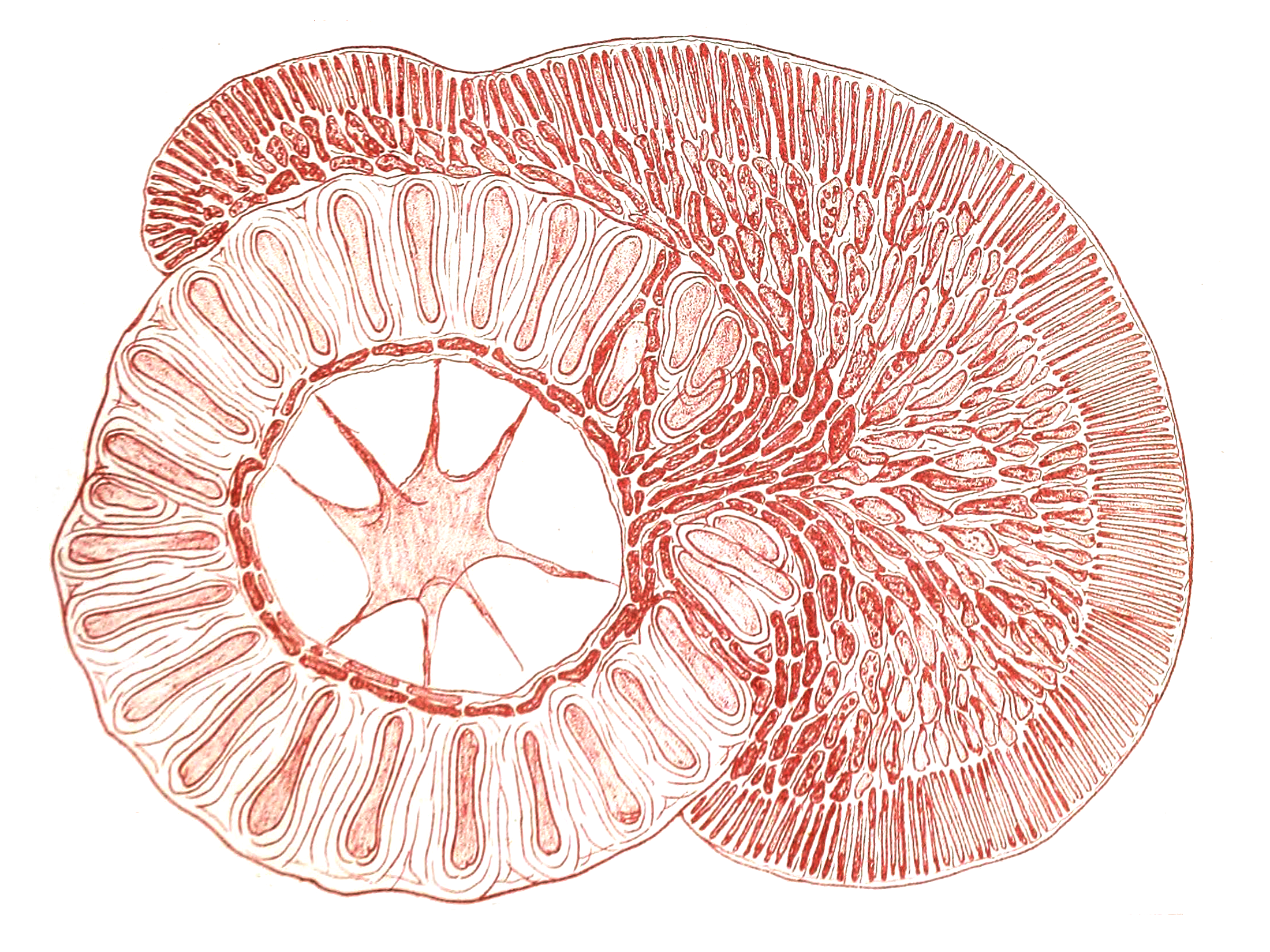
- Cross section of Choreocolax polysiphoniae on epiphytic red algae Polysiphonia lanosa

Scientific classification
- Domain: Eukaryota
- Clade: Archaeplastida
- Division: Rhodophyta
- Class: Florideophyceae
- Order: Ceramiales
- Family: Choreocolacaceae
- Genus: Choreocolax
- Species: C. polysiphoniae

Binomial name
- Choreocolax polysiphoniae Reinsch, 1875

= Choreocolax polysiphoniae =

Species of alga

Choreocolax polysiphoniae is a minute marine parasitic alga in the division Rhodophyta.

== Description ==
This small parasitic alga grows on the red alga Polysiphonia lanosa. It grows as an irregular sphere on the fronds of the alga, reaching no more than 1 mm in extent.

== Habitat ==
Parasitic on Polysiphonia lanosa, the filaments grow into the host.

== Distribution ==
The species has been reported from North Russia and the Pacific. In Ireland it has been confidently recorded from counties Down, Antrim and Waterford and at scattered sites around the British Isles including the Shetland Islands.

== Reproduction ==
Cruciate tetrasporangia are produced all year round in the cortex. The gametangial are dioecious and are produced in spring and summer.
