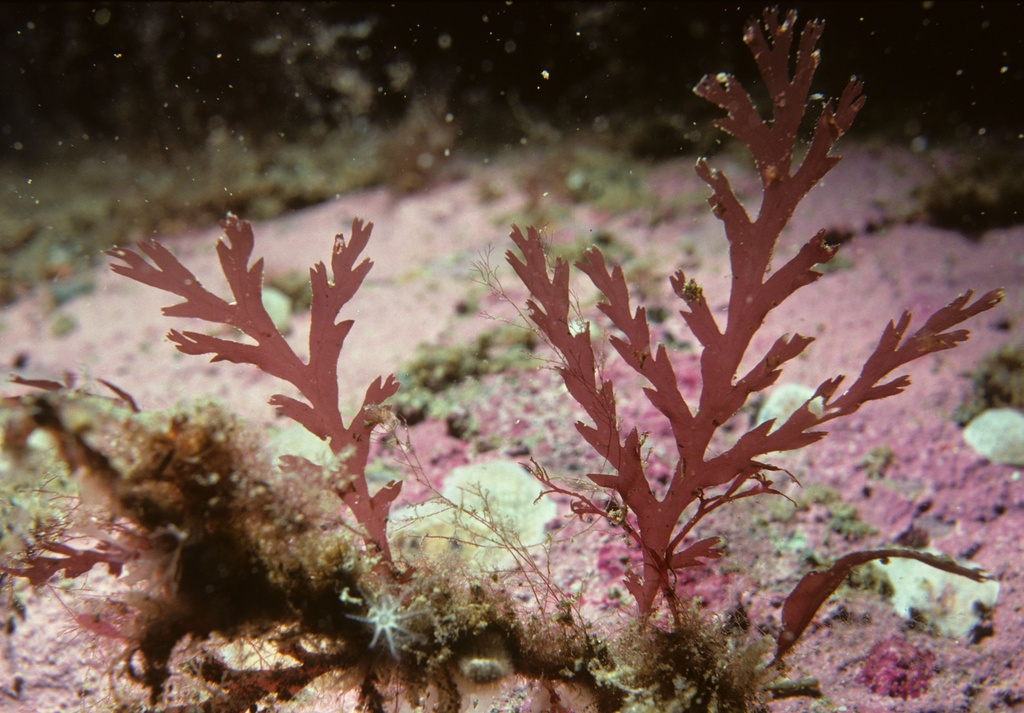
- Odonthalia dentata found in Newfoundland

Scientific classification
- Domain: Eukaryota
- Clade: Archaeplastida
- Division: Rhodophyta
- Class: Florideophyceae
- Order: Ceramiales
- Family: Rhodomelaceae
- Genus: Odonthalia
- Species: O. dentata

Binomial name
- Odonthalia dentata (Linnaeus) Lyngbye, 1819

Forms
- Odonthalia dentata f. angustata Harvey, 1852

Synonyms
- Atomaria dentata (Linnaeus) Stackhouse, 1816; Fimbriaria dentata (Linnaeus) Stackhouse, 1809; Fucus dentatus Linnaeus, 1767; Fucus pinnatifidus Oeder, 1767; Rhodomela dentata (Linnaeus) C.Agardh, 1824; Sphaerococcus dentatus (Linnaeus) C.Agardh, 1817

= Odonthalia dentata =

Red alga

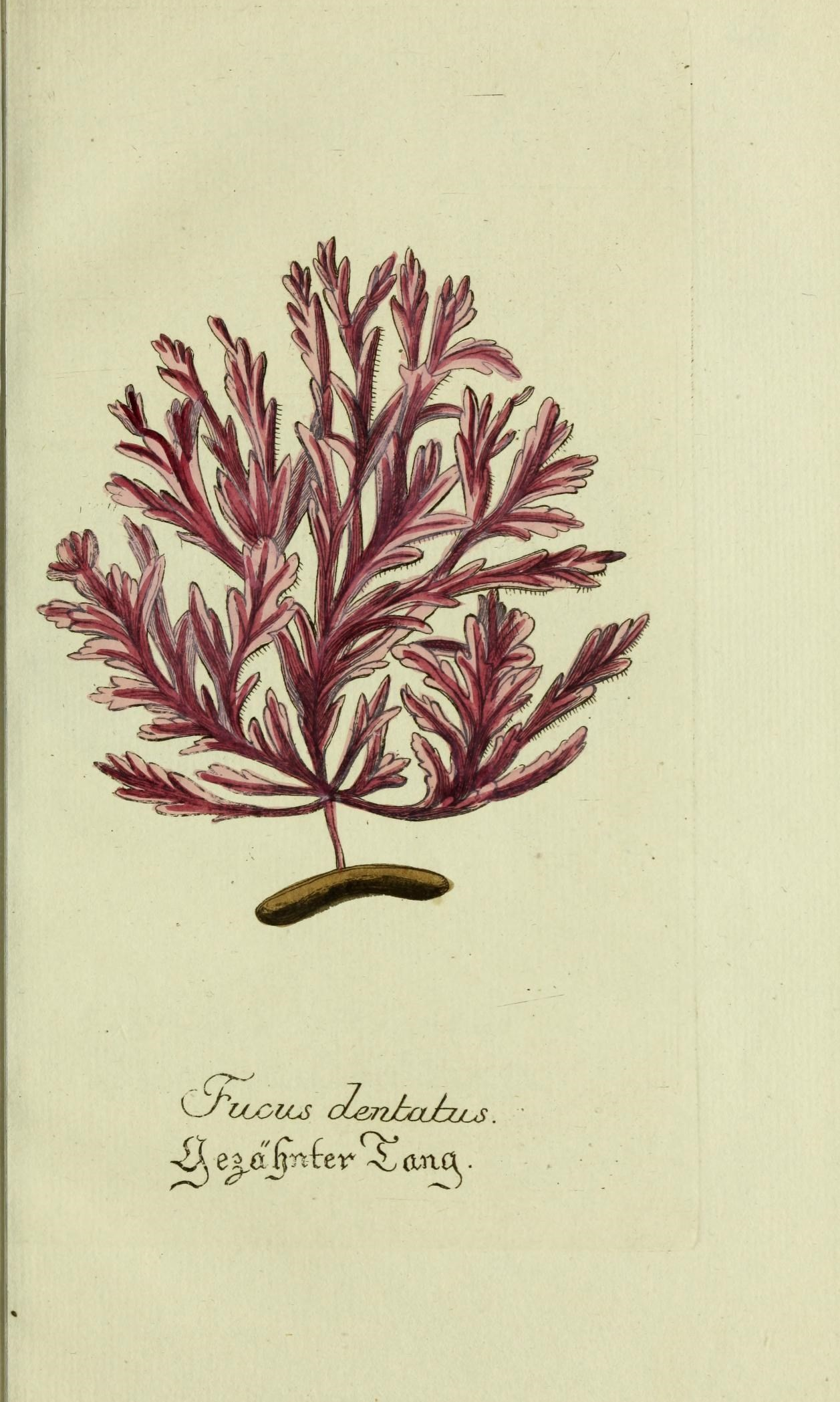
Illustration of Odonthalia dentata (formerly Fucus dentatus)

Odonthalia dentata is a medium-sized marine red alga.

== Description ==
The thallus of this species is dark red in colour and tough in texture, it grows to 30 cm long and 1 cm wide. It is perennial and attached by a discoid holdfast, it grows in tufts, erect, firm and cartilaginous. All the axes and branches are compressed or flat with an inconspicuous central midrib. The lateral branches are short and are produced alternately from near the base, they are deeply toothed.

== Reproduction ==
The planta are perennial and the sexes are produced on separate plants, dioecious. Spermatangia are in small clusters at the apex of the frond. The female cystocarps are found in the axils of the axis. Tetrasporangia occur in pairs in branchlets.

== Habitat ==
Common on northern shores of Great Britain and Ireland in low littoral rock pools and in the sub-littoral to 20m. Also on the stipes of Laminaria.

== Distribution ==
The species is common on the northern coasts of Ireland, Great Britain, the Isle of Man and The Shetland Isles. It is also recorded from Spitzbergen, Arctic Canada to Nova Scotia.
