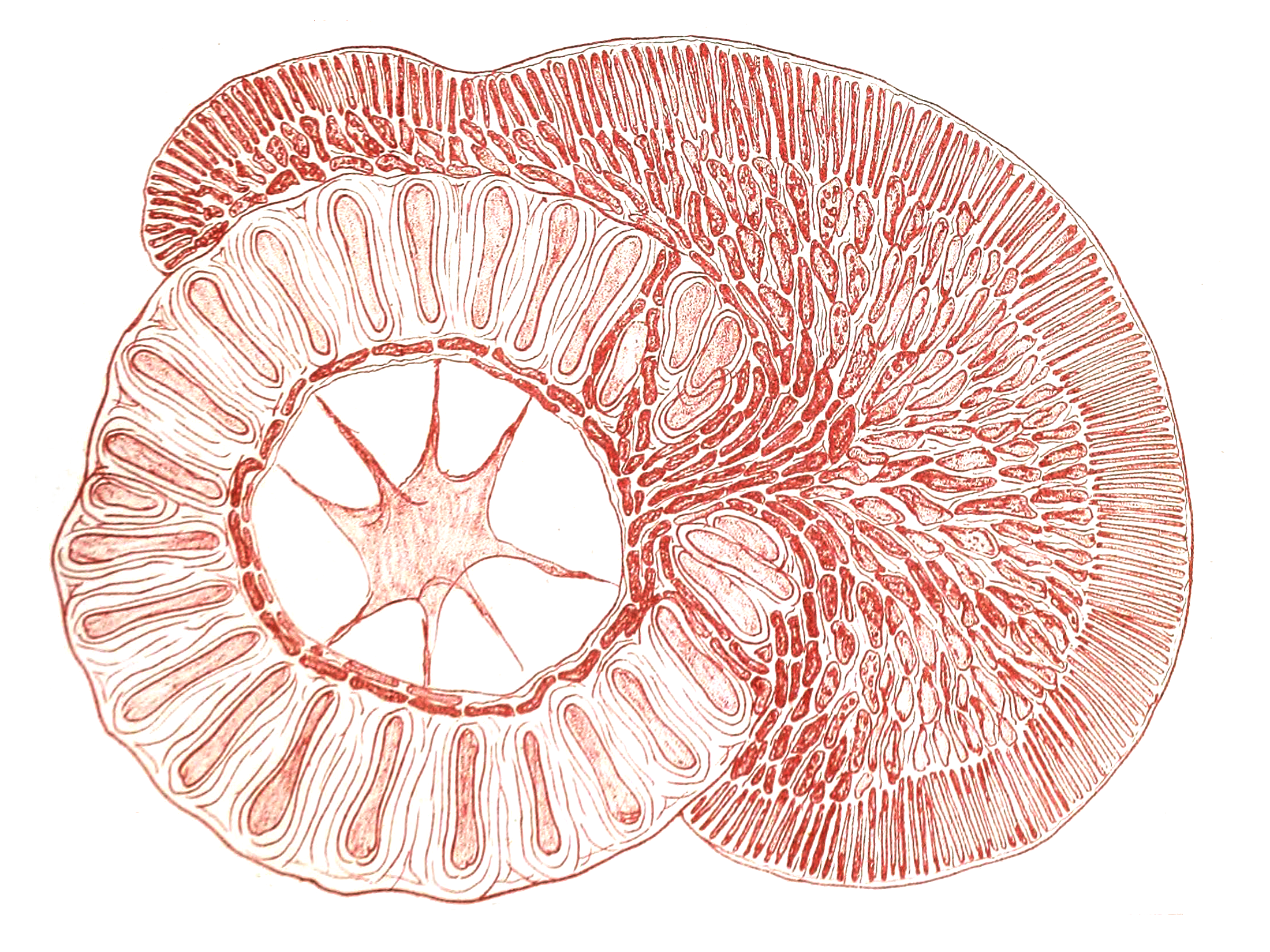
- Cross section of Choreocolax polysiphoniae on epiphytic red algae Polysiphonia lanosa

Scientific classification
- Clade: Archaeplastida
- Division: Rhodophyta
- Class: Florideophyceae
- Order: Ceramiales
- Family: Choreocolacaceae
- Genus: Choreocolax; Reinsch, 1875

Species
- Choreocolax macronema Reinsch, 1875; Choreocolax polysiphoniae Reinsch, 1875; Choreocolax rabenhorstii Reinsch, 1875; Choreocolax rhodymeniae Reinsch, 1888; Choreocolax tumidus Reinsch

= Choreocolax =

Genus of algae

Choreocolax is a genus of red algae in the order Ceramiales
