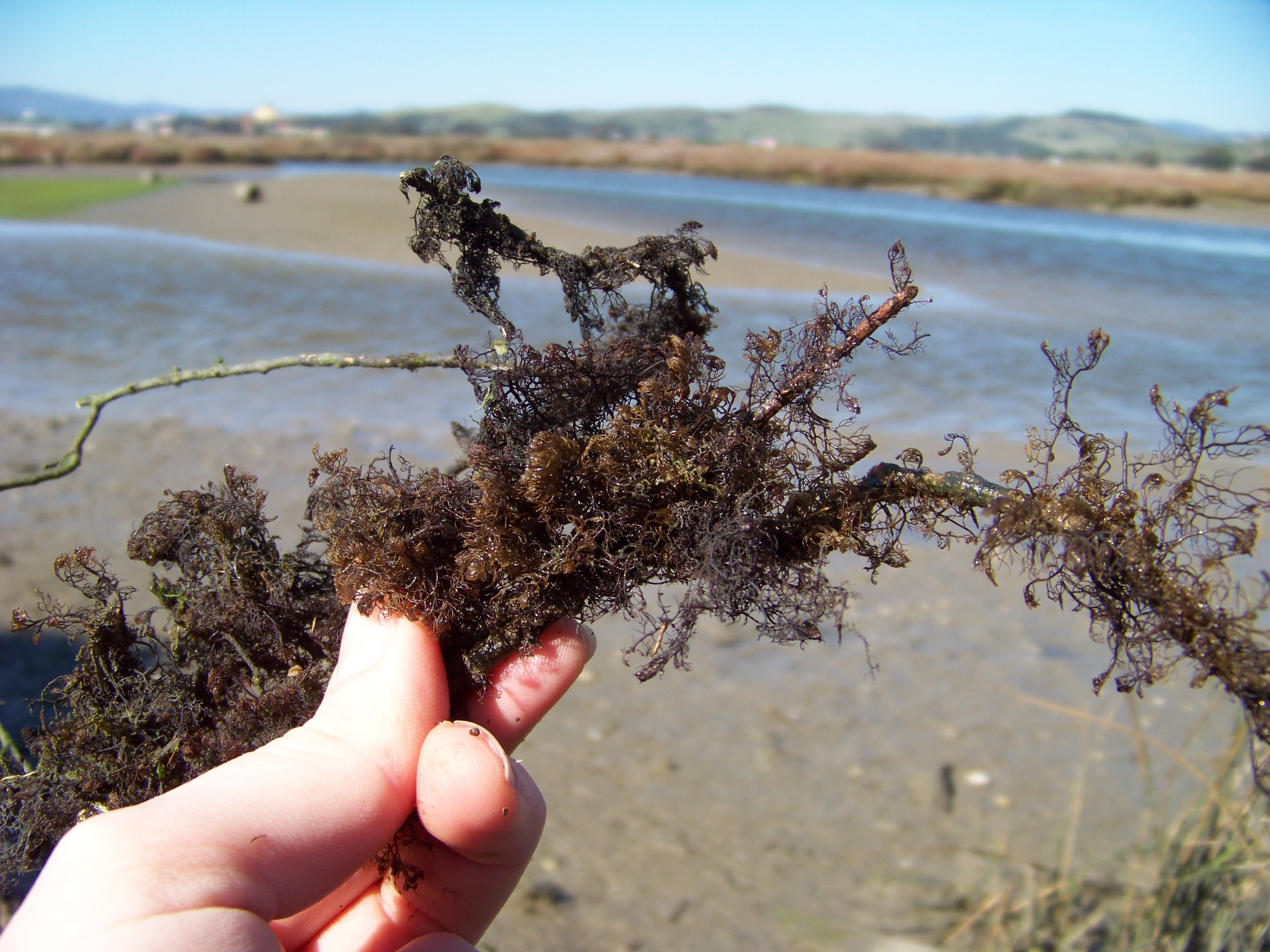
- Bostrychia scorpioides

Scientific classification
- Clade: Archaeplastida
- Division: Rhodophyta
- Class: Florideophyceae
- Order: Ceramiales
- Family: Rhodomelaceae
- Genus: Bostrychia; Montagne, 1842

= Bostrychia (alga) =

Genus of algae

Bostrychia is a genus of filamentous red alga. Species may grow as epiphytes on other plants in salt marsh and mangrove habitats.

== Species ==
Accepted species

1. Bostrychia anomala J.A.West, S.Loiseaux de Goër & G.C.Zuccarello
2. Bostrychia arbuscula W.H.Harvey
3. Bostrychia binderi Harvey
4. Bostrychia bipinnata Harvey ex J.Agardh
5. Bostrychia bispora J.West & G.Zuccarello
6. Bostrychia bryophila Zanardini
7. Bostrychia calliptera (Montagne) Montagne
8. Bostrychia cornigera Montagne
9. Bostrychia disticha J.Agardh
10. Bostrychia flagellifera Post
11. Bostrychia fulcrata Zanardini
12. Bostrychia glomerata J.Agardh
13. Bostrychia gracilis (R.J.King & Puttock) Zuccarello & J.A.West
14. Bostrychia harveyi Montagne
15. Bostrychia hongkongensis C.K.Tseng
16. Bostrychia intricata (Bory) Montagne
17. Bostrychia jelineckii Grunow
18. Bostrychia kaernbachii Grunow
19. Bostrychia kelanensis Grunow
20. Bostrychia kingii Zuccarello, J.A.West & M.Kamiya
21. Bostrychia lepida Montagne
22. Bostrychia leptoclada Montagne
23. Bostrychia mamillosa Kützing
24. Bostrychia monosiphonia Montagne
25. Bostrychia montagnei Harvey
26. Bostrychia moritziana (Sonder ex Kützing) J.Agardh
27. Bostrychia nigrescens F.v.Mueller
28. Bostrychia pannosa J.Agardh
29. Bostrychia pauperula Grunow
30. Bostrychia pilulifera Montagne
31. Bostrychia radicans (Montagne) Montagne
32. Bostrychia radicosa (Itono) J.A.West, G.C.Zuccarello & M.H.Hommersand
33. Bostrychia scorpioides (Hudson) Montagne - type
34. Bostrychia sertularia Montagne
35. Bostrychia siliquis J.Agardh
36. Bostrychia simpliciuscula Harvey ex J.Agardh
37. Bostrychia sonderiana Grunow
38. Bostrychia tangatensis Post
39. Bostrychia tenella (J.V.Lamouroux) J.Agardh
40. Bostrychia vaga J.D.Hooker & Harvey
41. Bostrychia wardii W.H.Harvey ex J.Agardh
