= Paul Falkenberg =

German botanist (1848–1925)

Paul Falkenberg (German: Paul Falkenberg; 1848–1925) was a German botanist. He was a professor of botany and Director of Botanical Garden Rostock. He was known for his works in anatomy and morphology of plants (“Vergleichende Untersuchungen der Vegetationsorgane der Monocotyledonen”, Stuttgart, 1876), and on the algae. Falkenberg dedicated much on the study to the most extensive and most difficult group red algae Rhodomelaceae (“Rhodomelaceae” in Engler und Prantl's Die natürlichen Pflanzenfamilien, Leipzig., 1897).

== Works ==
- Falkenberg, P. 1876: "Vergleichende Untersuchungen über den Bau der Vegetationsorgane der Monocotyledonen." Ferdinand Enke, Stuttgart. pp. 220.
- Falkenberg, P., 1881. Die Algen im weitesten Sinne. In: A. Schenk - Handbuch der Botanik. 23. Lieferung. pp. 159–302, 25 figs. Encyklopaedie der Naturwissenschaften. Erste Abtheilung. Band 2 (1882). Eduard Trewendt, Breslau. XI + 696 pp., 96 figs. [Characeen pp. 240–248, fig. 13]
- Schmitz, Fr., and Falkenberg, P. (1897). Rhodomelaceae. In Die Natürlichen Pflanzenfamilien. 1(2). (Eds A. Engler and K.Prantl.) pp. 421–480.

== Literature ==
- Berichte der Deutschen Botanischen Gesellschaft 44 (1927), pp. 88–94 (with script index and portrait)
- Wissenschaftliche Zeitschrift der Universität Rostock, Mathematisch-Naturwissenschaftliche Reihe 17 (1968), p. 269
- Grewolls, Grete (2011). Wer war wer in Mecklenburg und Vorpommern. Das Personenlexikon (in German). Rostock: Hinstorff Verlag. p. 2665. ISBN 978-3-356-01301-6.
