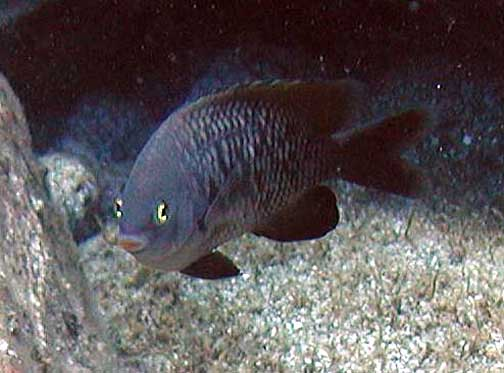

Scientific classification
- Kingdom: Animalia
- Phylum: Chordata
- Class: Actinopterygii
- Order: Blenniiformes
- Family: Pomacentridae
- Genus: Stegastes
- Species: S. marginatus

Binomial name
- Stegastes marginatus (Jenkins, 1901)

= Stegastes marginatus =

Species of fish

Stegastes marginatus, commonly called the Hawaiian gregory, is a species of damselfish in the family Pomacentridae that is endemic to the Hawaiian Islands. It feeds on filamentous algae.

== Distribution and habitat ==
Stegastes marginatus is endemic to Hawaii, where it is found on shallow seaward reefs particularly in areas with mild to moderate water movement. Although previously synonymized with S. fasciolatus, it is apparently distinct based on DNA and morphological study.
