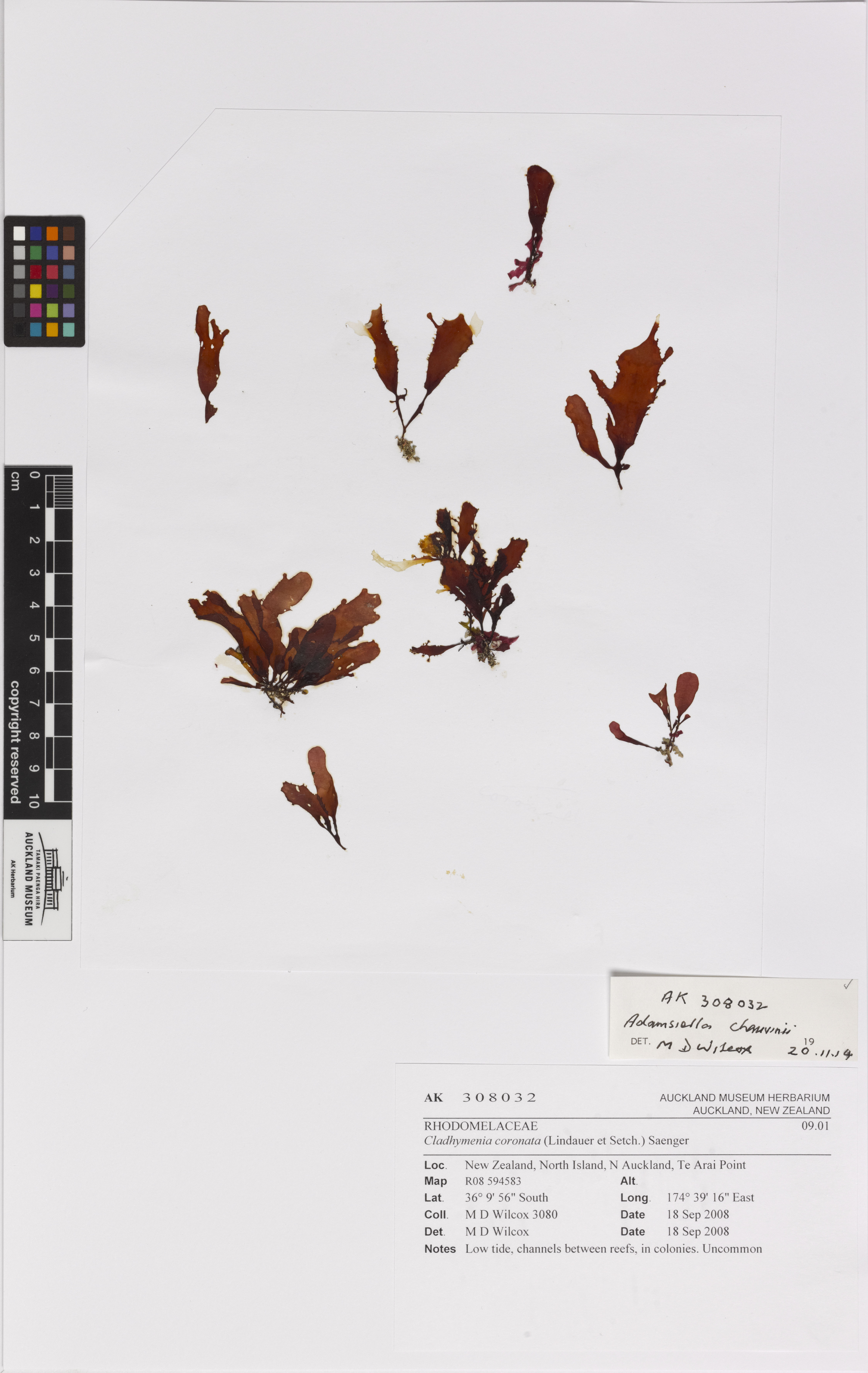

Scientific classification
- Domain: Eukaryota
- Clade: Archaeplastida
- Division: Rhodophyta
- Class: Florideophyceae
- Order: Ceramiales
- Family: Rhodomelaceae
- Genus: Adamsiella; L.E. Phillips & W.A. Nelson, 2002

Species
- Adamsiella angustifolia; Adamsiella chauvinii; Adamsiella lorata; Adamsiella melchiori L.E. Phillips & W.A. Nelson (type)

= Adamsiella =

Genus of algae

Adamsiella is a genus of red alga closely related to the genus Lenormandia. The holotype species for the genus is Adamsiella melchiori L.E. Phillips & W.A. Nelson.
