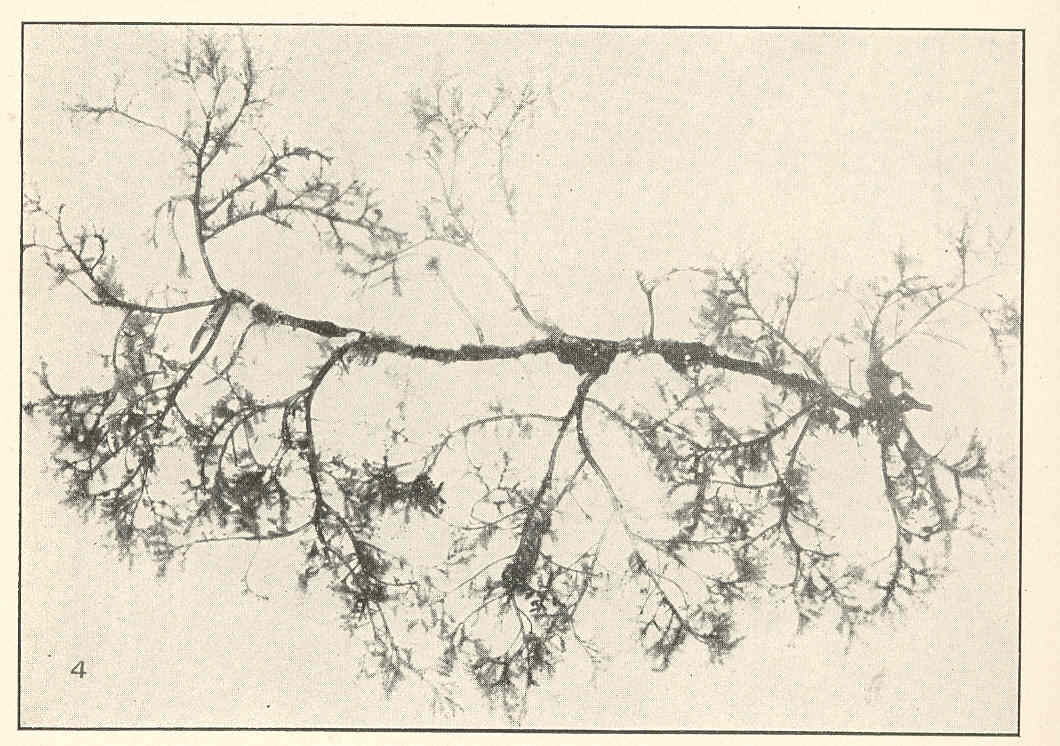
- Brongniartella mucronata

Scientific classification
- Domain: Eukaryota
- Supergroup: Archaeplastida
- Division: Rhodophyta
- Class: Florideophyceae
- Order: Ceramiales
- Family: Rhodomelaceae; Aresch., 1847

Tribes
- Amansieae Schmitz, 1889; Bostrychieae; Brongniartelleae; Chondrieae; Herposiphonieae Schmitz & Falkenberg, 1897; Heterocladieae; Laurencieae; Lophothalieae Schmitz & Falkenberg, 1897; Neotenophyceae; Polysiphonieae Schmitz, 1889; Polyzonieae; Pterosiphonieae; Sonderelleae

= Rhodomelaceae =

Family of algae

Rhodomelaceae is estimated to be the largest red algae family, with about 125 genera and over 700 species.

== Included taxa ==
Rhodomelaceae includes the following tribes and genera:

- Alsidieae Ardissone (15)
  - Alsidium C.Agardh - 8 spp.
  - Digenea C.Agardh, 1822 - 7 spp.
- Amansieae Schmitz, 1889 (62)
  - Adamsiella L.E.Phillips & W.A.Nelson, 2002 - 4 spp.
  - Amansia J.V.Lamouroux, 1809 - 17 spp.
  - Aneurianna L.E.Phillips, 2006 - 4 spp.
  - Enantiocladia Falkenberg, 1897 - 3 spp.
  - Epiglossum Kützing, 1849 - 2 spp.
  - Halopithys Kützing, 1843 - 3 spp.
  - Kentrophora S.M.Wilson & Kraft, 2001 - 2 spp.
  - Kuetzingia Sonder, 1845 - 2 spp.
  - Lenormandia Sonder, 1845 - 6 spp.
  - Nanopera S.M.Wilson & G.T.Kraft, 2000 - 1 sp.
  - Neurymenia J.Agardh, 1863 - 2 spp.
  - Osmundaria J.V.Lamouroux, 1813 - 24 spp.
  - Protokuetzingia Falkenberg, 1897 - 1 sp.
  - Rytiphlaea C.Agardh, 1817 - 5 spp.
  - Vidalia J.V.Lamouroux ex J.Agardh, 1863 - 3 spp.
- Bostrychieae (43)
  - Bostrychia Montagne, 1842 - 43 spp.
- Chondrieae (95)
  - Acanthophora J.V.Lamouroux, 1813 - 7 spp.
  - Benzaitenia Yendo, 1913 - 1 sp.
  - Chondria C.Agardh, 1817 - 79 spp.
  - Coeloclonium J.Agardh, 1876 - 4 spp.
  - Husseya J.Agardh, 1901 - 1 spp.
  - Neochondria S.Sutti, M.Tani, Y.Yamagishi, T.Abe & K.Kogame, 2018 - 2 spp.
  - Ululania K.E.Apt & K.E.Schlech, 1998 - 1 spp.
- Dipterosiphonieae Díaz-Tapia & Maggs - (6)
  - Dipterosiphonia F.Schmitz & Falkenberg, 1897 - 6 spp.
- Herposiphonieae Schmitz & Falkenberg, 1897 (71)
  - Ditria Hollenberg, 1967 - 3 spp.
  - Gredgaria Womersley, 2003 - 1 spp.
  - Herpopteros Falkenberg, 1897 - 1 spp.
  - Herposiphonia Nägeli, 1846 - 60 spp.
  - Herposiphoniella Womersley, 2003 - 1 spp.
  - Tiparraria Womersley, 2003 - 1 spp.
  - Wilsonosiphonia D.Bustamante, Won & T.O.Cho, 2017 - 4 spp.
- Heterocladieae (3)
  - Heterocladia Decaisne, 1841 - 3 spp.
- Laurencieae (225)
  - Chondrophycus (J.Tokida & Y.Saito) Garbary & J.T.Harper, 1998 - 15 spp.
  - Corynecladia J.Agardh, 1876 - 3 spp.
  - Janczewskia Solms-Laubach, 1877 - 8 spp.
  - Laurencia J.V.Lamouroux, 1813 - 136 spp.
  - Laurenciella V.Cassano, Gil-Rodrüguez, Sentües, Düaz-Larrea, M.C.Oliveira & M.T.Fujii, 2012 - 8 spp.
  - Ohelopapa F.Rousseau, Martin-Lescanne, Payri & L.Le Gall, 2017 - 1 sp.
  - Osmundea Stackhouse, 1809 - 24 spp.
  - Palisada K.W.Nam, 2007 - 26 spp.
  - Rodriguezella F.Schmitz, 1895 - 7 spp.
  - Yuzurua (Nam) Martin-Lescanne, 2010 - 2 spp.
- Lophothalieae Schmitz & Falkenberg, 1897 (19)
  - Haplodasya Falkenberg, 1897 - 2 spp.
  - Lophocladia F.Schmitz, 1893 - 8 spp.
  - Lophothalia Kützing, 1849 - 2 spp.
  - Spirophycus A.J.K.Millar, 2000 - 1 sp.
  - Veleroa E.Y.Dawson, 1944 - 6 spp.
- Neotenophyceae (1)
  - Neotenophycus Kraft & I.A.Abbott, 2002 - 1 sp.
- Polysiphonieae Schmitz, 1889 (227)
  - Alleynea Womersley, 2003 - 1 sp.
  - Boergeseniella Kylin, 1956 - 1 sp.
  - Bryocladia F.Schmitz, 1897 - 5 spp.
  - Carradoriella P.C.Silva, 1996 - 5 sp.
  - Chiracanthia Falkenberg, 1897 - 1 sp.
  - Echinothamnion Kylin, 1956 - 4 spp.
  - Epizonaria Díaz-Tapia & Maggs, 2017 - 1 sp.
  - Eutrichosiphonia Savoie & G.W.Saunders, 2018 - 4 spp.
  - Falkenbergiella Kylin, 1938 - 1 sp.
  - Kapraunia Savoie & G.W.Saunders, 2018 - 4 spp.
  - Lophurella F.Schmitz, 1897 - 11 spp.
  - Perrinia Womersley, 2003 - 1 sp.
  - Pityophykos Papenfuss, 1958 - 1 sp.
  - Polysiphonia Greville, 1823 - 186 spp.
  - Symphyocolax M.S.Kim, 2010 - 1 sp.
- Polyzonieae (13)
  - Cliftonaea (Harvey) Harvey, 1863 - 1 sp.
  - Dasyclonium J.Agardh, 1894 - 10 spp.
  - Echinosporangium Kylin, 1956 - 1 sp.
  - Polyzonia Suhr, 1834 - 1 sp.
- Pterosiphonieae (60)
  - Aphanocladia Falkenberg, 1897 - 6 spp.
  - Dictyomenia Greville, 1830 - 6 spp.
  - Heterostroma Kraft & M.J.Wynne, 1992 - 1 sp.
  - Jeannerettia Hooker f. & Harvey, 1847 - 1 sp.
  - Aphanocladia Falkenberg, 1897 - 6 spp.
  - Pentocladia Huisman, 2018 - 1 sp.
  - Periphykon Weber-van Bosse, 1929 - 2 spp.
  - Pollexfenia Harvey, 1929 - 5 spp.
  - Pterosiphonia Falkenberg, 1897 - 1 sp.
  - Savoiea M.J.Wynne, 2018 - 4 spp.
  - Symphyocladia Falkenberg, 1897 - 8 spp.
  - Symphyocladiella D.E.Bustamante, B.Y.Won & T.O.Cho, 2019 - 8 spp.
  - Womersleyella Hollenberg, 1967 - 4 spp.
  - Xiphosiphonia Savoie & G.W.Saunders, 2016 - 3 spp.
- Sonderelleae (2)
  - Lembergia Saenger, 1971 - 1 sp.
  - Sonderella F.Schmitz, 1897 - 1 sp.

Incertae sedis:

- Abbottella Hollenberg, 1967
- Acrocystis Zanardini, 1872
- Aiolocolax M.A.Pocock, 1956
- Amplisiphonia Hollenberg, 1939
- Antarctocolax Skottsberg, 1953
- Ardissonula J.De Toni, 1936
- Beringiella M.J.Wynne, 1980
- Bostrychiocolax Zuccarello & J.A.West, 1994
- Bryothamnion Kützing, 1843
- Carpocaulon Kützing, 1843 (nomen dubium)
- Chamaethamnion Falkenberg, 1897
- Choreocolax Reinsch, 1875
- Cladhymenia Harvey, 1845
- Cladurus Falkenberg, 1897
- Colacopsis De Toni, 1903
- Ctenosiphonia Falkenberg, 1897
- Dawsoniella Hollenberg, 1967
- Dawsoniocolax A.B.Joly & Yamaguishi-Tomita, 1970
- Digeneopsis Simons, 1970
- Dipterocolax J.Morrill, 1977
- Dolichoscelis J.Agardh, 1897
- Doxodasya (F.Schmitz) Falkenberg, 1901
- Echinophycus Huisman, 2001
- Endosiphonia Zanardini, 1878
- Enelittosiphonia Segi, 1949
- Erythrocystis J.Agardh, 1876
- Erythrostachys J.Agardh ex Jean White, 1912
- Exophyllum Weber-van Bosse, 1911
- Fernandosiphonia Levring, 1941
- Gonatogenia J.Agardh, 1896
- Harveyella F.Schmitz & Reinke, 1889
- Hawaiia Hollenberg, 1967
- Heterodasya Joly & Oliveira, 1966
- Holotrichia F.Schmitz, 1897
- Hutchinsia C.Agardh, 1817 (nomen dubium)
- Jantinella Kylin, 1941
- Kintarosiphonia S.Uwai & M.Masuda, 1999
- Laurenciocolax A.D.Zinova & L.P.Perestenko, 1964
- Leachiella Kugrens, 1982
- Leptosiphonia Kylin, 1956
- Leveillea Decaisne, 1839
- Levringiella Kylin, 1956
- Lophura Kützing, 1843 (nomen dubium)
- Melanothamnus Bornet & Falkenberg, 1901
- Meridiocolax J.Morrill, 1976
- Metamorphe Falkenberg, 1897
- Microcolax F.Schmitz, 1897
- Micropeuce J.Agardh, 1899
- Murayella F.Schmitz, 1893
- Murrayella F.Schmitz, 1893
- Neorhodomela Masuda, 1982
- Odonthalia Lyngbye, 1819
- Oligocladella P.C.Silva, 1996
- Onychocolax M.A.Pocock, 1956
- Ophidocladus Falkenberg, 1897
- Pachychaeta Kützing, 1862
- Phaeocolax Hollenberg, 1967
- Picconiella De Toni fil., 1936
- Placophora J.Agardh, 1863
- Pleurostichidium Heydrich, 1893
- Pterochondria Hollenberg, 1942
- Pterosiphoniella E.Y.Dawson, 1963
- Pycnothamnion P.J.L.Dangeard, 1953
- Rhodolachne M.J.Wynne, 1970
- Rhodomela C.Agardh, 1822
- Rhodomelopsis Pocock, 1953
- Rytiphloea C.A.Agardh, 1817
- Schizochlaenion M.J.Wynne & R.E.Norris, 1982
- Spirocladia Børgesen, 1933
- Sporoglossum Kylin, 1919
- Stichothamnion Børgesen, 1930
- Streblocladia F.Schmitz, 1897
- Stromatocarpus Falkenberg, 1897
- Tayloriella Kylin, 1938
- Trichidium J.M.Noble & Kraft, 1984
- Trigenea Sonder, 1845
- Tylocolax F.Schmitz, 1897
- Vertebrata S.F.Gray, 1821
- Waldoia W.R.Taylor, 1962
- Waputikia C.Walcott, 1919 †
- Wilsonaea F.Schmitz, 1893
- Wrightiella F.Schmitz, 1893
