= Peace Parks Foundation =

African nature conservation organisation

- Formation: 1997
- Founder: Prince Bernhard of the Netherlands, Nelson Mandela, Anton Rupert
- Type: non-profit organisation
- Registration no.: 1997/004896/08 (005-294 NPO)
- Headquarters: Stellenbosch, South Africa
- Location: 11 Termo Road, Techno Park, Stellenbosch, 7600, South Africa
- Region served: Africa
- Subsidiaries: SA College for Tourism NPC; Southern African Wildlife College NPC
- Website: http://www.peaceparks.org

Peace Park Foundation, founded in 1997 by Dr Anton Rupert, President Nelson Mandela and Prince Bernhard of the Netherlands, is an organisation that aims to re-establish, renew and conserve large ecosystems in Africa, transcending man-made boundaries by creating regionally integrated and sustainably managed networks of Transfrontier Conservation Areas (TFCAs). Peace Parks Foundation has been involved in the establishment and development of ten of the 18 TFCAs found throughout southern Africa, all of which are in various stages of development. The establishment of each TFCA, or peace park, is complex and far-reaching, and involves several phases of activity, which can take many years to achieve.

== Overview: Thinking beyond boundaries ==
The IUCN World Commission on Protected Areas (WCPA), Transboundary Conservation Specialist Group (https://portals.iucn.org/library/node/45173#:~:text=IUCN%20World%20Commission%20on%20Protected%20Areas%20(WCPA)%2C%20Transboundary%20Conservation%20Specialist%20Group) in their publication, 'Transboundary Conservation - A systematic and integrated approach' (Vasilijević, M., Zunckel, K., McKinney, M., Erg, B., Schoon, M., Rosen Michel, T. (2015). Transboundary Conservation: A systematic and integrated approach. Best Practice Protected Area Guidelines Series No. 23, Gland, Switzerland: IUCN.) outline the history of Peace Parks, indicating that the concept is a global one, tracing back to transboundary conservation initiatives pioneered in Europe and North America, but as early as the 18th century, a Treaty of Alliance between Louis XVI, King of France, and Frederic of Wangen, Prince-Bishop of Basel, recognized that offences related to forests, hunting and fishing had to be properly dealt with in order to keep good relations and peace between the two bordering states. This agreement called for uniform laws to cover these issues in the shared region. The Krakow Protocol, signed on 6 May 1924 by the governments of Poland and what was then Czechoslovakia, provided for the final delineation of a disputed boundary left over from World War I, and the bilateral regulation of tourism and traffic in the border areas. The Krakow Protocol has particular importance for transboundary conservation as its Annex, signed on 5 September 1925, outlined the designation of a joint bilateral nature park in the Pieniny Mountains. However, the provisions of this Annex were not implemented until 1932, when Europe’s first TBPA was established at an official ceremony held in Crveny Klastor (in today’s Slovakia). In the 1930s Canada and the United States of America created the ambitious Waterton-Glacier International Peace Park. The idea of TFCAs remain a compelling concept and conclusive evidence has shown that transboundary habitats flourish more than disconnected habitats, as these areas accommodate gene pools, wildlife movement and migration, water flow and the propagation of plant species. This also creates opportunities for regional economic development and shared conservation of biodiversity and promote regional peace and stability by demonstrating the benefits of cooperation.

One of the greatest barriers to the protection of cross-border ecosystems is the lack of sufficient resources with which to successfully implement the plans and visions of those who commit themselves to the pursuit. This includes a lack of expertise in the field of conservation and nature-based economies, as well as a lack of funds to execute actions and address shortcomings.

== The Foundation at work ==
Peace Parks Foundation assists TFCA partner countries in identifying key projects, designing project plans and in securing the necessary funds required to implement projects. By so doing, Peace Parks engages with governments to secure protected land and channel investment into the development of transboundary conservation areas. Most of these areas suffer from devastated ecosystems and depleted wildlife, because of the ravages of war and excessive commercial exploitation of these natural resources. The organisation plans and implements innovative strategies that revitalise habitat integrity, restore ecological functionality, and protect biodiversity. This includes translocating animals to rewild previously decimated wilderness areas, as well as investing significant resources into the reduction of wildlife crime.

The Foundation develops nature-based tourism and enterprise opportunities to ensure the long-term sustainability of protected areas. At the same time, it focuses on communities living in and around these wild spaces, capacitating them in the sustainable use of natural resources and unlocking opportunities for them to derive equitable benefits from conservation.

Peace Parks’ support also includes capacity building through the appointment of key role players such as technical advisors, park and project managers, and even rangers. Peace Parks will often act as project implementation agent for the TFCA partner countries to take the role in matters such as contractual project execution and operations.

== TFCAs that Peace Parks is involved in ==
=== Great Limpopo ===
On 9 December 2002, Heads of State of Mozambique, South Africa and Zimbabwe signed an international treaty at Xai-Xai, Mozambique to establish the Great Limpopo Transfrontier Park (GLTP).

This 35 000 km^{2} park links the Limpopo National Park in Mozambique, the Kruger National Park in South Africa, and the Gonarezhou National Park in Zimbabwe. The GLTP forms the core of the larger Great Limpopo Transfrontier Conservation Area, measuring almost 100 000 km^{2}, that includes the Banhine and Zinave National Parks, the Massingir and Corumana areas and interlinking regions in Mozambique, as well as various privately and state-owned conservation areas in South Africa and Zimbabwe bordering on the transfrontier park.

=== Lubombo ===
The Lubombo Transfrontier Conservation and Resource Area (TFCA) Protocol was signed between the Governments of Mozambique, South Africa and Swaziland on 22 June 2000.

The Lubombo Transfrontier Conservation and Resource Area includes four distinct transfrontier conservation areas between Mozambique, South Africa and The Kingdom of eSwatini, covering a total area of 10 029 km^{2}. It lies in the Maputaland Centre of Plant Endemism that includes five Ramsar sites, which are Ndumo Game Reserve, the Kosi Bay System, Lake Sibaya, the Turtle Beaches and Coral Reefs of Tongaland and Lake St. Lucia (Africa's largest estuary).

The TFCA boasts the first marine TFCA in Africa, the Ponta do Ouro-Kosi Bay TFCA, that connects Mozambique's Ponta do Ouro Partial Marine Reserve with South Africa's iSimangaliso Wetland Park, which is a World Heritage Site.

=== Kavango Zambezi ===
On 7 December 2006, the five partner countries sign an MoU to establish the world's largest transfrontier conservation area and appoint the KAZA Secretariat to steer its development.

The Kavango Zambezi (KAZA) TFCA is situated in the Kavango and Zambezi river basins where the borders of Angola, Botswana, Namibia, Zambia and Zimbabwe converge. It spans an area of approximately 520 000 km^{2} and includes 36 proclaimed protected areas such as national parks, game reserves, forest reserves, community conservancies and game/wildlife management areas. Nestled within KAZA's boundaries are two of Africa's biggest tourist attractions. The Victoria Falls is both a World Heritage Site and one of the seven natural wonders of the world. The Okavango Delta, the largest inland delta and a World Heritage Site, is a significant place where largescale migrations of megafauna take place annually.

=== Malawi-Zambia ===
On 13 August 2004, an MoU was signed towards the establishment of the Malawi-Zambia TFCA.

The 32 278 km^{2} Malawi-Zambia TFCA incorporates national parks, wildlife reserves, forest reserves and game management areas.

The TFCA comprises two main components:

The Nyika-North Luangwa component is centred on a high montane grassland plateau rising over 2 000 m above the bushveld and wetlands of Vwaza Marsh. These high-lying areas are often shrouded in mist, giving them a unique appeal. In summer a multitude of wildflowers and orchids burst forth on the highlands, making it a sight unlike any seen in most other game parks.

The Kasungu/Lukusuzi component, on the other hand, is an area of significant importance for biodiversity conservation in the Central Zambezian Miombo Woodland Ecoregion.

=== /Ai/Ais-Richtersveld ===
In August 2003, Namibia and South Africa signed a treaty to officially establish the /Ai/Ais-Richtersveld Transfrontier Park, and joint management, tourism and financial protocol plans were completed.

Spanning across 5 920 km^{2}, this transfrontier park comprises the Ai-Ais Hot Springs Game Park in Namibia and the Richtersveld National Park in South Africa. The /Ai/Ais-Richtersveld Transfrontier Park spans across some of the most spectacular arid and desert mountain scenery in southern Africa and includes the Fish River Canyon, the world's second largest canyon. This is also where one-third of the world's 10 000 succulent species grow.

=== Kgalagadi ===
On 7 April 1999, a bilateral agreement recognising the newly named Kgalagadi Transfrontier Park (KTP) is signed between Botswana's Department of Wildlife and National Parks and South African National Parks. This agreement established the first formally recognised transfrontier park in Southern Africa.

Today, the KTP is 35 551 km^{2} in extent, of which 73% is in Botswana with the remainder in South Africa.

=== Greater Mapungubwe ===
On 22 June 2006, an MoU signalling the intent to establish and develop the Limpopo/Shashe TFCA was signed and an international coordinator appointed.

Situated at the confluence of the Shashe and Limpopo Rivers, the Greater Mapungubwe TFCA measures 5 909 km2 and encompasses areas in three countries, which are Botswana, South Africa and Zimbabwe. The Kingdom of Mapungubwe was once the centre of civilisation in the south with evidence of the oldest modern capital city in southern Africa with over 5 000 inhabitants living there at its peak in ±1 100 AD.

=== Maloti-Drakensberg ===
On 11 June 2001, an MoU was signed between South Africa and Lesotho towards the establishment of the Maloti-Drakensberg Transfrontier Conservation and Development Area.

The Maloti-Drakensberg Transfrontier Conservation and Development Area covers 14 740 km^{2} of the mountains that straddle the north-eastern border between Lesotho and South Africa. This cross-border protected area preserves the globally important biodiversity and cultural value of the entire region. The vast stretch of land is home to almost two million people, contributing to an explicit goal of the TFCA, to make a positive difference in the livelihoods of people by ensuring that they benefit from nature-based tourism.

=== Liuwa Plains-Mussuma ===
In 2011, an MoU and supporting documentation for the establishment of the Liuwa Plains-Mussuma TFCA were finalised for signing.

In 2013, Zambia and Angola met to discuss the development of an Integrated Development Plan for the TFCA.

The Liuwa Plains-Mussuma TFCA measures 14 464 km^{2} and spans the border of Angola and Zambia. This TFCA protects the second largest wildebeest migration in Africa, as well as a significant portion of the catchment area of the Zambezi River, Africa's fourth largest river system.

=== Lower Zambezi-Mana Pools ===
Measuring 17 745 km^{2}, the Lower Zambezi-Mana Pools TFCA is composed of the Lower Zambezi National Park (4,092 km^{2}) in Zambia, and the Mana Pools National Park in northern Zimbabwe (2,196 km^{2}). This transfrontier conservation area lies in the Zambezi Valley, which since the dawn of time has been used by wildlife as a thoroughfare between the escarpment and the Zambezi River.

== See also ==
- Transboundary protected area
- Protected area
- List of national parks in Africa
- International Union for Conservation of Nature
- List of largest protected areas in the world
