= ISimangaliso Marine Protected Area =

Marine conservation area in northern kwaZulu-Natal in South Africa

iSimangaliso Marine Protected Area
- iSimangaliso Marine Protected Area MPA location
- Location: Northern kwaZulu-Natal, South Africa
- Coordinates: 27°41.0′S 33°03.0′E
- Area: 443 km^{2} (171 sq mi) (original), 10,700 km^{2} (4,100 sq mi) (total)
- Established: 2004
- Governing body: iSimangaliso Wetland Park Authority
- World Heritage site: yes
- ISimangaliso Marine Protected Area (South Africa)

The iSimangaliso Marine Protected Area is a coastal and offshore marine protected area in KwaZulu-Natal from the South Africa-Mozambique border in the north to Cape St Lucia lighthouse in the south.

== History ==
The original St Lucia and Maputaland MPAs were proclaimed in the 1970s to protect the coral reefs and the beaches where loggerhead and leatherback turtles make their nests. The Maputaland Marine Protected Area, also known as the Maputaland Marine Reserve, was a marine protected area (MPA) along the Indian Ocean coastline of northern KwaZulu-Natal, South Africa. The Maputaland MPA, which forms part of iSimangaliso Wetland Park, extended a distance of 3 nautical miles (5.6 km; 3.5 mi) seawards from the coast between the Mozambique border and Gobey's Point near Lake Sibhayi. To the south it abuts the St Lucia Marine Protected Area.

In 1998 these MPAs were combined, and a large offshore restricted zone, the iSimangaliso Offshore Marine Protected Area, added in 2019 to become the iSimangaliso MPA. The MPA includes the country's most north-eastern stretch of coastline, is South Africa's only UNESCO marine World Heritage Site and the second largest protected area in the country after the Kruger National Park. iSimangaliso is a Zulu word that means "miracle and wonder".

This subtropical area includes forests dotted with lakes and swamps, as well as coral reefs and deserted beaches. The deep, soft sediment provides homes for spider crabs and deep water rock lobsters.

== Purpose ==
A marine protected area is defined by the IUCN as "A clearly defined geographical space, recognised, dedicated and managed, through legal or other effective means, to achieve the long-term conservation of nature with associated ecosystem services and cultural values".

The offshore extension is intended for the protection of deep water ecosystems and to secure the habitat and foraging areas of endangered Leatherback turtles and coelacanths.

The stated objectives include contribution to the national and global system of marine protected areas by protecting sensitive and endangered ecosystems in a large contiguous area which connects inshore and offshore habitats, to provide sustainable ecotourism through appropriate zonation, to protect spawning stock, which may allow stock recovery and increase abundance both in the protected and adjacent areas, and to protect particular species and their habitats. This includes the canyons and the known coelacanth population, and cold-water corals, and breeding areas for turtle species.

== Extent ==
The original length of the protected shoreline is 145 km, and the area of protected ocean is 443 km^{2} The additional offshore controlled area of 10,700 km^{2} (4,100 sq mi) makes this the largest MPA in the South African network. Th length of coast is increased to 220 km and surface area to 13 289 km^{2}

=== Boundaries ===
The boundaries of the MPA are:

- Northern border: S26°51.515', E32°53.454' to S26º59.376’, E33º27.366′
- Eastern border: S26º59.376’, E33º27.366′ to S28º31.3265’, E33º27.755’
- Southern border: S28º31.3265’, E33º27.755’ to S28°31.174′, E32°24.0587′
- Western border: S28°31.174′, E32°24.0587′ to S26°51.515', E32°53.454' along the high-water mark, excluding estuaries.

=== Zonation ===
The Maputaland and St Lucia Marine Reserves form a continuous protected area stretching 150 km from the Mozambique border to Cape Vidal for 3 nautical miles out to sea. These are now part of the iSimangaliso MPA.

==== Inshore zonation ====
The inshore zones lie between the high water mark and low water mark, except the controlled pelagic area which extends 100 m seawards of the high water mark.

iSimangaliso inshore sanctuary zone 1: (South African-Mozambique border to 500 m north of the Kosi North Bank)

- An inshore sanctuary zone between the high water and low water marks
- Northern boundary: A line east-south-east from S26°51.5148', E32°53.4527' at the South Africa-Mozambique border
- Southern border: A line bearing east from S26°53.411', E32°52.844'.

iSimangaliso inshore controlled pelagic zone 1: (500 m north of the Kosi north bank to 2 km south of the mouth of the Kosi Lake)

- A controlled pelagic zone between the high water mark and a line 100 m seawards of the high water mark
- Northern boundary: A line bearing east from S26°53.411', E32°52.844'.
- Southern boundary: A line bearing east from S26°54.???', E32°52.847'

iSimangaliso inshore sanctuary zone 2: (2 km south of the mouth of the Kosi Lake to beacon N13)

- An inshore sanctuary zone between the high water and low water marks
- Northern boundary: A line bearing east from S26°54.???', E32°52.847'
- Southern boundary: A line bearing east from S26°56.999', E32°52.349'

iSimangaliso inshore controlled pelagic zone 2: (Beacon N13 to Boteler Point)

- A controlled pelagic zone between the high water mark and a line 100 m seawards of the high water mark
- Northern boundary: A line bearing east from S26°56.999', E32°52.349'
- Southern boundary: A line bearing east from S27°00.835', E32°52.010'

iSimangaliso inshore sanctuary zone 3: (Boteler Point to 1 km south of Dog Point)

- An inshore sanctuary zone between the high water and low water marks
- Northern boundary: A line bearing east from S27°00.835', E32°52.010'
- Southern boundary: A line bearing east from S27°06.935', E32°50.198'

iSimangaliso Inshore Controlled Pelagic Zone 3 (1 km south of Dog Point to north of Sodwana Bay)

- A controlled pelagic zone between the high water mark and a line 100 m seawards of the high water mark
- Northern boundary: A line bearing east from S27°06.935', E32°50.198'
- Southern boundary: A line bearing east from S27°31.583', E32°40.411'

iSimangaliso Inshore Controlled Zone 1: (North of Sodwana Bay to Sodwana lighthouse)

- A controlled area is situated between the high water and low water marks
- Northern boundary: A line bearing east from S27°31.583', E32°40.411'
- Southern boundary: A line bearing east from S27°32.737', E32°40.745'

iSimangaliso Inshore Controlled Pelagic Zone 4: (Sodwana lighthouse to Red Sands)

- A controlled pelagic zone between the high water mark and a line 100 m seawards of the high water mark
- Northern boundary: A line bearing east from S27°31.583', E32°40.411'
- Southern boundary: A line bearing east from S27°43.067', E32°37.610'

iSimangaliso Inshore Wilderness Zone 1: (Red Sands to Leven Point)

- A wilderness area is situated between the high water and low water marks
- Northern boundary: A line bearing east from S27°43.067', E32°37.610'
- Southern boundary: A line bearing east from S27°55.864', E32°35.659'

iSimangaliso Inshore Controlled Pelagic Zone 5: (Leven Point to 4 km north of Cape Vidal)

- A controlled pelagic zone between the high water mark and a line 100 m seawards of the high water mark
- Northern boundary: A line bearing east from S27°55.864', E32°35.659'
- Southern boundary: A line bearing east from S28°05.104', E32°33.616'

iSimangaliso Inshore Controlled Zone 2: (4 km North of Cape Vidal to 1 km south of Cape Vidal)

- A controlled area is situated between the high water and low water marks
- Northern boundary: A line bearing east from S28°05.104', E32°33.616'
- Southern boundary: A line bearing east from S28°08.694', E32°33.306'

iSimangaliso Inshore Controlled Pelagic Zone 6: (1 km south of Cape Vidal to 6.5 km north of Mziki path)

- A controlled pelagic zone between the high water mark and a line 100 m seawards of the high water mark
- Northern boundary: A line bearing east from S28°08.694', E32°33.306'
- Southern boundary: A line bearing east from S28°12.171', E32°31.700'

iSimangaliso Inshore Sanctuary Zone 4: (6.5 km north of Mziki Path to Mziki Path)

- An inshore sanctuary zone between the high water and low water marks
- Northern boundary: A line bearing east from S28°12.171', E32°31.700'
- Southern boundary: A line bearing east from S28°15.335', E32°29.929'

iSimangaliso Inshore Controlled Pelagic Zone 7: (Mziki Path to 2 km north of the St Lucia swimming beach)

- A controlled pelagic zone between the high water mark and a line 100 m seawards of the high water mark
- Northern boundary: A line bearing east from S28°15.335', E32°29.929'
- Southern boundary: A line bearing east from S28°21.???', E32°26.384'

iSimangaliso Inshore Controlled Zone 3: (2 km north of the St Lucia swimming beach to 1.6 km south of Maphelane Point)

- A controlled area is situated between the high water and low water marks
- Northern boundary: A line bearing east from S28°21.???', E32°26.384'
- Southern boundary: A line bearing east from S28°25.356', E32°25.642'

iSimangaliso Inshore Controlled Pelagic Zone 8: (1.6 km south of Maphelane Point to Middle Railway Ledges)

- A controlled pelagic zone between the high water mark and a line 100 m seawards of the high water mark
- Northern boundary: A line bearing east from S28°25.356', E32°25.642'
- Southern boundary: A line bearing east from S28°27.745', E32°25.030'

iSimangaliso Inshore Sanctuary Zone 5: (Middle Railway Ledges to 500 m south of the Cape St Lucia Lighthouse)

- An inshore sanctuary zone between the high water and low water marks
- Northern boundary: A line bearing east from S28°27.745', E32°25.030'
- Southern boundary: A line bearing east from S28°31.171', E32°24.176'

==== Offshore zonation ====
The offshore zones are bounded inshore by the low water mark and offshore by a line parallel to the low water mark at a distance of three nautical miles to seaward.

iSimangaliso offshore sanctuary zone 1: (Mozambique border to beacon N13)

- An offshore sanctuary zone between the low water mark and a distance of three nautical miles offshore of the low water mark
- Northern boundary: A line east-south east from S26°51.515', E32°53.453' at the South Africa-Mozambique border
- Southern boundary: A line due east from S26°56.999' E32°52.349'

iSimangaliso offshore controlled pelagic zone 1: (beacon N13 to Boteler Point)

- An offshore controlled pelagic area between the low water mark and a distance of three nautical miles offshore of the low water mark
- Northern boundary: A line due east from S26°56.999', E32°52.349'
- Southern boundary: A line due east from S27°00.835', E32°52.010'

iSimangaliso offshore sanctuary zone 2: (Boteler Point to 1 km south of Dog Point)

- An offshore sanctuary zone between the low water mark and a distance of three nautical miles offshore of the low water mark
- Northern boundary: A line due east from S27°00.835', E32°52.010'
- Southern boundary: A line due east from S27°06.935', E32°50.108'

iSimangaliso offshore controlled pelagic zone 2: (1 km south of Dog Point to north of Sodwana Bay)

- An offshore controlled pelagic area between the low water mark and a distance of three nautical miles offshore of the low water mark
- Northern boundary: A line due east from S27°06.935' E32°50.108'
- Southern boundary: A line due east from S27°31.583', S32°40.411'

iSimangaliso offshore controlled zone 1: (North of Sodwana Bay to the Sodwana lighthouse)

- An offshore controlled zone between the low water mark and a distance of three nautical miles offshore of the low water mark
- Northern boundary: A line due east from S27°31.583', E32°40.411'
- Southern boundary: A line due east from S27°32.737', E32°40.775'

iSimangaliso offshore controlled pelagic zone 3 (Sodwana lighthouse to Red Sands)

- An offshore controlled pelagic area between the low water mark and a distance of three nautical miles offshore of the low water mark
- Northern boundary: A line due east from S27°32.737', E32°40.775'
- Southern boundary: A line due east from S27°43.067', E32°37.610'

iSimangaliso offshore wilderness zone 1: (Red Sands to Leven Point)

- An offshore wilderness zone between the low water mark and a distance of three nautical miles offshore of the low water mark
- Northern boundary: A line due east from S27°43.067', E32°37.610'
- Southern boundary: A line due east from S27°55.864', E32°35.659'

iSimangaliso offshore controlled pelagic zone 4: (Leven Point to 4 km north of the Cape Vidal on-ramp)

- An offshore controlled pelagic area between the low water mark and a distance of three nautical miles offshore of the low water m*An offshore sanctuary zone between the low water mark and a distance of three nautical miles offshore of the low water mark
- Northern boundary: A line due east from S27°55.864', E32°35.659'
- Southern boundary: A line due east from S28°05.184', E32°33.616'

iSimangaliso offshore controlled zone 2: (4 km north of the Cape Vidal on-ramp to 1 km south of Cape Vidal.)

- An offshore controlled zone between the low water mark and a distance of three nautical miles offshore of the low water mark
- Northern boundary: A line due east from S28°05.184', E32°33.616'
- Southern boundary: A line due east from S28°08.694', E32°33.306'

iSimangaliso offshore controlled pelagic zone 5: (1 km south of Cape Vidal to 2 km north of the St Lucia swimming beach)

- An offshore controlled pelagic area between the low water mark and a distance of three nautical miles offshore of the low water mark
- Northern boundary: A line due east from S28°08.694', E32°33.306'
- Southern boundary: A line due east from S28°21.???', E32°26.384'

iSimangaliso offshore controlled zone 3: (2 km north of the St Lucia swimming beach to 1.6 km south of Maphelane Point)

- An offshore controlled zone between the low water mark and a distance of three nautical miles offshore of the low water mark
- Northern boundary: A line due east from S28°21.???', E32°26.384'
- Southern boundary: A line due east from S28°25.356', E32°25.642'

iSimangaliso offshore controlled pelagic zone 6: (1.6 km south of Maphelane Point to 500 m south of the Cape St Lucia Lighthouse)

- An offshore controlled pelagic area between the low water mark and a distance of three nautical miles offshore of the low water mark
- Northern boundary: A line due east from S28°25.356', E32°25.642'
- Southern boundary: A line due east from S28°31.171', E32°24.176'

==== Restricted areas ====
The offshore extension area from 3 nautical miles seaward of the low water mark to the offshore boundaries of the MPA.

iSimangaliso offshore restricted zone 1: (offshore extension)

- A restricted area with inshore (western) boundary at three nautical miles from the low water mark from S28°31.345', E32°27.718' to S26°52.356', E32°56.723'
- Northern boundary: S26°52.356', E32°56.723' to S26°58.881', E33°22.345'
- Eastern boundary: S26°58.881', E33°22.345' to S28°31.345', E33°22.345'
- Southern boundary: S28°31.345', E33°22.345' to S28°31.345', E32°27.718'

== Management ==
The marine protected areas of South Africa are the responsibility of the national government, which has management agreements with a variety of MPA management authorities, in this case, the iSimangaliso Wetland Park Authority, which manages the MPA with funding from the SA Government through the Department of Environmental Affairs (DEA).

The Department of Agriculture, Forestry and Fisheries is responsible for issuing permits, quotas and law enforcement.

== Use ==
=== Activities requiring a permit ===
==== Fishing ====
The game and bait fish that be caught in the controlled-pelagic zone of the MPA are in the following families, and all species in these families may be caught.

Pelagic gamefish species:

- Carangidae (garrick, kingfish, queenfish, yellowtail)
- Coryphaenidae (dorado)
- Istiophoridae (marlin and sailfish)
- Pomatomidae (elf/shad)
- Rachycentridae (cobia/prodigal son)
- Scombridae (mackerels, tuna, wahoo)
- Sphyraenidae (barracudas)

Pelagic baitfish species:

- Atherinidae (silversides)
- Belonidae (garfish)
- Chirocentridae (wolfherring)
- Clupeidae (red-eyes, sardines)
- Engraulidae (anchovies, glass-noses)
- Exocoetidae (flying fish)
- Hemiramphidae (halfbeaks)
- Scomberesocidae (sauries)

==== Scuba diving ====
A permit is required to scuba dive in any MPA in South Africa, including the recreational dive sites of the iSimangaliso Marine Protected Area. These permits are valid for a year and are available at some branches of the Post Office. Temporary permits, valid for a month, may be available at dive shops or from dive boat operators who operate in an MPA. A personal recreational scuba diving permit is valid in all South African MPAs where recreational diving is allowed. The business permit to operate recreational scuba business operations in an MPA is restricted to a specific MPA. Diving for commercial or scientific purposes is also subject to permit.

===== Named dive sites =====
Some of the dive sites are so close to each other that the available resolution of position does not distinguish between them.

- 1/4 mile Reef (10 m) 27.53°S 32.68°E
- Bikini (22 m) 27.53°S 32.69°E
- Bikini 2 27.53°S 32.69°E
- Bikini 3 27.53°S 32.69°E
- Bikini North 27.53°S 32.69°E
- Hopscotch north (26 m) 27.53°S 32.69°E
- Mellow Yellow south (18 m) 27.53°S 32.69°E
- 2 mile 2-Buoy (14 m) 27.53°S 32.69°E
- 2 mile 2-Buoy block 27.53°S 32.69°E
- 2 mile 4-Buoy (14 m) 27.52°S 32.69°E
- 2 mile 4-Buoy block 27.52°S 32.69°E
- 2 mile Antons (16 m) 27.53°S 32.68°E
- 2 mile Antons S tip (16 m) 27.53°S 32.68°E
- 2 mile Antons south 27.53°S 32.68°E
- 2 mile Arches (14 m) 27.52°S 32.68°E
- 2 mile Ash 1 27.52°S 32.69°E
- 2 mile Catt N 27.52°S 32.69°E
- 2 mile Catt Reef (18 m) 27.52°S 32.69°E
- 2 mile Caves (14 m) 27.53°S 32.69°E
- 2 mile Caves 27.53°S 32.69°E
- 2 mile Caves & Overhangs 16 m 27.53°S 32.69°E
- 2 mile Caves north 27.53°S 32.69°E
- 2 mile Chain (14 m) 27.53°S 32.69°E
- 2 mile Chain Pieter 27.53°S 32.69°E
- 2 mile Coral Gardens (14 m) 27.52°S 32.69°E
- 2 mile Grand Central (14 m) 27.52°S 32.69°E
- 2 mile Grave (30 m) 27.52°S 32.69°E
- 2 mile Hot spots north (30 m) 27.51°S 32.70°E
- 2 mile Hot Spots south (30 m) 27.51°S 32.70°E
- 2 mile Hotspots (30 m) 27.51°S 32.70°E
- 2 mile Pinnacle (14 m) 27.52°S 32.69°E
- 2 mile Pinnacles (14 m) 27.52°S 32.69°E
- 2 mile Pinnacles block 27.52°S 32.69°E
- 2 mile Pinnacles south 27.52°S 32.69°E
- 2 mile S-Chain (18 m) 27.53°S 32.69°E
- 2 mile Simons 27.52°S 32.69°E
- 2 mile Simon's Cave (18 m) 27.52°S 32.69°E
- 2 mile Tiles 1 27.52°S 32.69°E
- 2 mile Waynes World 27.52°S 32.69°E
- 2 mile Wayne's World (14 m) 27.52°S 32.69°E
- 2 mile Zambi Alley (16 m) 27.53°S 32.69°E
- 2 outside Deep Sponge (35 m) 27.52°S 32.7°E
- 2 outside Deep Sponge / Tombstone (30 m) 27.52°S 32.69°E
- 2 outside Deep Sponge 2 (30 m) 27.52°S 32.69°E
- 2 outside Sponge (35 m) 27.52°S 32.69°E
- 2 outside Sponge (19 m) 27.52°S 32.69°E
- 2 Roonies (30 m) 27.52°S 32.69°E
- 2 Roonies 27.53°S 32.69°E
- 2 Roonies north 27.53°S 32.69°E
- 2 Stringer (14 m) 27.53°S 32.68°E
- 2 Stringer 27.53°S 32.70°E
- 3 mile (23 m) 27.50°S 32.69°E
- 3 mile 27.50°S 32.69°E
- 3 mile Pin 27.50°S 32.69°E
- 5 Canyon (48 m) 27.49°S 32.70°E
- 5 Canyon 27.49°S 32.70°E
- 5 Canyon Wall (38–46 m) 27.49°S 32.70°E
- 5 Fusilier (21 m) 27.49°S 32.69°E
- 5 Fusilier 27.49°S 32.69°E
- 5 mile (23 m) 27.49°S 32.69°E
- 5 mile 5 pin 27.50°S 32.70°E
- 5 mile Cabbage 30 m 27.49°S 32.70°E
- 5 mile Gotham (46 m) 27.49°S 32.70°E
- 5 mile Lettuce - Uniform 30 m 27.50°S 32.70°E
- 5 mile Pachycerus (36 m) 27.49°S 32.7°E
- 5 mile Pothole (22 m) 27.49°S 32.69°E
- 5 mile Ribbon (19 m) 27.49°S 32.69°E
- 5 mile Ribbon North (19 m) 27.49°S 32.69°E
- 5 mile Ribbon South 27.49°S 32.69°E
- 6 mile Snapper College 26 m 27.46°S 32.71°E
- 7 mile North 22 m 27.49°S 32.70°E
- 7 mile North 27.45°S 32.71°E
- 7 mile South (22 m) 27.45°S 32.71°E
- 7 mile South 27.45°S 32.71°E
- 7-Mile north 27.45°S 32.71°E
- 7-Mile northern 27.45°S 32.71°E
- 7 mile Amphitheatre (20 m) 27.45°S 32.71°E
- 7 mile Castle R 27.45°S 32.71°E
- 7 mile Mushroom Rocks (22 m) 27.45°S 32.71°E
- 7 mile North Wall (22 m) 27.45°S 32.71°E
- 8 mile (19 m) 27.45°S 32.71°E
- 8-Mile 2 27.45°S 32.71°E
- 8-Mile 3 27.44°S 32.71°E
- 8 mile Ramsey (18 m) 27.44°S 32.71°E
- 9 mile (18 m) 27.41°S 32.73°E
- 9 mile 9 tree 27.41°S 32.73°E
- 9 mile 9-Mile green tree 27.41°S 32.73°E
- 9 mile Breaking Waters (16 m) 27.42°S 32.72°E
- 9 mile drop off (23 m) 27.42°S 32.73°E
- 9 mile tree 27.41°S 32.73°E
- Diepgat South (64 m) 27.61°S 32.67°E

== Geography ==
This part of the coast of Africa has a very narrow and fairly shallow continental shelf, with the shelf edge in the 70 to 100 m depth range and mostly less than 5 kilometers offshore, with several undersea canyons cutting into the shelf edge and continental slope. The shoreline is mostly sandy beach with a few outcrops of more resistant rock forming occasional headlands, as at Jesser Point. The seabed of the shelf is largely covered by sand and coarse, shelly sediment, with patches of coral reef. The reefs in the vicinity of Jesser Point are generally named for their distance from the launching area in the bay protected by the point.

The southward-flowing Agulhas Current has a strong influence on the oceanic and coastal environment of the MPA, as it brings warm waters from the tropics along the edge of the continental shelf, which is close inshore and relatively shallow, however, there is a net northward longshore transport of sediment along the coast. In combination with cross-shelf sand movements, this strongly affects intertidal habitats, and tends to cover the rocky shores with sand. Tidal range is about 1.5 to 2 m. This is a high energy coast with the predominant swell direction from the southeast for about 40% of the year, though prolonged north-easterly winds can produce a north-easterly swell.

== Ecology ==
Marine ecoregions of the South African Exclusive Economic Zone: iSimangaliso Marine Protected area is in the Delagoa ecoregion.

The MPA is in the tropical Delagoa ecoregion in the far north of kwaZulu-Natal. The marine biome is characterised by a wrm sea

Five major habitats exist in the sea in this region, distinguished by the nature of the substrate. The substrate, or base material, is important in that it provides a base to which an organism can anchor itself, which is vitally important for those organisms which need to stay in one particular kind of place. Rocky shores and reefs provide a firm fixed substrate for the attachment of plants and animals, as do reef building corals. Coral reefs are a biotic equivalent, usually with greater rugosity and high biodiversity. Sandy beaches and sedimentary bottoms are a relatively unstable substrate and cannot anchor many of the benthic organisms, but allow many organisms to live within the substrate. Submarine canyons are relatively deep and often provide shelter from currents. Finally there is the pelagic zone of open water, above the substrate, where the organisms must drift or swim. Mixed habitats are also frequently found, which are a combination of those mentioned above. There are no estuarine habitats in the MPA, but several are immediately adjacent.

iSimangaliso protects the southernmost extent of coral reefs in Africa, long sandy beaches, and deep submarine canyons. Two distinct coastal marine biogeographic regions meet in the Park at Cape Vidal. To the north is the Maputaland sub-province of the Tropical Indo-West Pacific Province, which extends to Ponta do Oura, and supports many tropical species not found anywhere else in South Africa. To the south, the Natal Sub-province of the Sub-tropical East Coast Province extends to Cape St Lucia, and supports many endemic species.

=== Rocky shores and reefs ===
There are rocky reefs and mixed rocky and sandy bottoms. For many marine organisms the substrate is another type of marine organism, and it is common for several layers to co-exist.

The type of rock of the reef is of some importance, as it influences the range of possibilities for the local topography, which in turn influences the range of habitats provided, and therefore the diversity of inhabitants. Sandstone and other sedimentary rocks erode and weather very differently to igneous and metamorphic rock, and depending on the direction of dip and strike, and steepness of the dip, may produce reefs which are relatively flat to very high profile and full of small crevices. These features may be at varying angles to the shoreline, currents, and wave fronts.

=== Coral reefs ===
The coral reefs of the iSimangaliso MPA are at the southern limit of the geographic range of coral reefs of the Western Indian Ocean. These reefs are not formed by the usual accretion process, but are a relatively thin layer on a substrate of Pleistocene sandstone. Nevertheless, they have a high biodiversity for a high latitude community. They can be grouped into northern, central and southern reef complexes, of which the central region at Sodwana Bay is the part used by recreational divers. The northern reefs are relatively inaccessible to tourists and the southern area is in a sanctuary.

=== Sandy beaches and sedimentary bottoms ===
Sedimentary bottoms at first glance appear to be fairly barren areas, as they lack the stability to support many of the spectacular reef based species, and the variety of large organisms is relatively low. The sediment is continually being moved around by wave action, to a greater or lesser degree depending on weather conditions and exposure of the area. This means that sessile organisms must be specifically adapted to areas of relatively loose substrate to thrive in them, and the variety of species found on a sandy or gravel bottom will depend on all these factors. Sedimentary bottoms have one important compensation for their instability, animals can burrow into the sediment and move up and down within its layers, which can provide feeding opportunities and protection from predation. Other species can dig themselves holes in which to shelter, or may feed by filtering water drawn through the tunnel, or by extending body parts adapted to this function into the water above the sand.

=== Submarine canyons ===
There are several submarine canyons along the edge of the continental shelf. These occasionally deflect deeper, colder, water to the shallower reef areas, where it mixes with the upper layers and has an overall cooling effect, which is thought may affect susceptibility to coral bleaching. These canyons are known to support a resident population of coelacanths at a relatively shallow depth compared to most other populations, and the coelacanths are known to require relatively cold, well oxygenated water.

=== Marine species diversity ===
325 species of seaweeds, 129 corals, 22 marine mammals, 991 marine fish, 812 marine molluscs, and 20 sponges are listed in the species checklists of the 1999 World Heritage schedules and the iSimangaliso Wetland Park rare, threatened and endemic species project. This list is not exhaustive.

==== Animals ====
The beaches of the MPA are a nesting site for loggerhead and leatherback turtles.

There is a resident population of West Indian Ocean coelacanths in the upper parts of the shelf-edge canyons.

==== Seaweeds ====
Listing of seaweed taxa recorded from the waters of the MPA or for which the MPA is within their recorded range:

Green algae (Chlorophyceae):

- Ulva fasciata
- Ulva intestinalis
- Ulva rigida
- Anadyomene wrightii
- Microdictyon kraussii
- Chaetomorpha antennina
- Cladophora horii
- Cladophora ordinata
- Cladophora rugulosa endemic
- Cladophora vagabunda
- Chamaedoris delphinii
- Boodlea composita
- Cladophoropsis herpestica
- Dictyosphaera cavernosa
- Dictyosphaera versluysii
- Phyllodictyon anastomosans
- Valonia macrophysa
- Valoniopsis pachynema
- Bryopsis myosuroides as far north as Rabbit Rock
- Trichosolen hainanensis north of Mabibi
- Caulerpa brachypus forma parvifolia
- Caulerpa cupressoides north of Mabibi
- Caulerpa filiformis
- Caulerpa mexicana
- Caulerpa nummularia
- Caulerpa racemosa var.laetevirens
- Caulerpa racemosa var.lamourouxii
- Caulerpa racemosa var.peltata
- Caulerpa scalpelliformis var. intermedia
- Caulerpa serrulata var. hummii
- Caulerpa taxifolia var. asplenioides
- Caulerpa webbiana
- Caulerpa zeyheri
- Codium caputatum
- Codium duthiae
- Codium lucasii
- Codium megalophysum
- Codium mozambiquense
- Codium papenfussii
- Codium platylobium south of Mmtwalume river
- Codium prostratum
- Halimeda cuneata
- Halimeda gracilis
- Halimeda tuna
- Preudocodium de-vriesii
- Pseudocodium floridanum
- Chlorodesmis hidenbrandtii
- Udotea orientalis
- Bornetella nitida
- Dasycladus ramosus
- Neomeris van-bosseae

Brown algae (Phaeophyceae):

- Ralfsia expansa
- Dictyopteris delicatula
- Dictyopteris ligulata
- Dictyopteris macrocarpa
- Dictyota cervicornis north of Mission Rocks
- Dictyota ciliolata north of Mabibi
- Dictyota friabilis
- Dictyota humifusa
- Lobophora variegata
- Padina boergesenii
- Padina boryana
- Spatoglossum asperium
- Stoechospermum polypodioides
- Stypopodium multipartitum
- Zonaria subarticulatum
- Chnoosporum minima
- Colpomenia sinuosa
- Endarachne binghamiae
- Hydroclathrus clathratus
- Cystoseira myrica
- Hormophysa cuneiformis north of Rabbit Rock
- Sargassum crassifolium north from Sodwana Bay
- Sargassum elegans
- Turbinaria ornata

Red algae (Rhodophyceae):

- Dichotomaria diesingiana south of Cape Vidal
- Dichotomaria tenera
- Galaxaura obtusata
- Galaxaura rugosa north from Sodwana Bay
- Tricleocarpa cylindrica north from Sodwana
- Liagora ceranoides Sodwana Bay
- Liagora divaricata north from Sodwana Bay
- Scinaia bengalica Sodwana Bay
- Gelidium abbottiorum south of Kosi Bay
- Gelidium foliacum south of Sodwana Bay
- Gelidium reptans
- Pterocladiella caerulescens
- Ptilophora helenaeMission Rocks
- Ptilophora heldebrandtii north from Sodwana Bay
- Gelidiella acerosa north from just south of Sodwana Bay
- Gracilaria aculeata south of Cape Vidal, SA endemic
- Gracilaria canaliculata north from Cape Vidal
- Gracilaria corticata
- Gracilaria denticulata
- Gracilaria salicornia north of Cape Vidal
- Gracilaria vieillardii
- Asparagopsis taxiformis
- Amphiroa beauvoisii
- Amphiroa ephedraea
- Arthrocardia carinata
- Arthrocardia flabellata
- Jania cultrata reported as Cheilosporum cultratum
- Cheilosporum proliferum
- Corallina officinalis south of Mission Rocks
- Haliptilon roseum north from Sodwana Bay
- Jania adhaerans
- Jania intermedia
- Jania verrucosa
- Metamastophora flabellata
- Gibsmithia hawaiiensis
- Hypnaea rosea
- Hyonea spicifera
- Hypnea tenuis
- Hypnea viridis
- Sonderophycus capensis recorded as Peyssonnelia capensis
- Phacelocarpus tristichus north from Sodwana Bay
- Portieria hornemannii
- Portieria tripinnata
- Callophycus condominius
- Meristotheca papulosa
- Plocamium beckeri
- Plocamium corallorhiza
- Plocamium suhrii south of Mission Rocks
- Plocamium telfairiae north of Cape Vidal
- Carpopeltis maillardii
- Carpopeltis phyllophora
- Halymenia durvillei
- Prionitis nodifera south of Mission Rocks
- Thamnoclonium dichotomum south of Sodwana Bay
- Predaea feldmannii Sodwana Bay
- Platoma cyclocolpum Sodwana Bay
- Champia compressa
- Champia indica Sodwana Bay
- Botryocladia leptopoda Sodwana Bay
- Gelidiopsis repens
- Halichrysis coalescens
- Rhodymenia natalensis
- Balliella crouanioides
- Ceramium flaccidum
- Ceramium poppigianum
- Euptilota fergusoni north from Sodwana Bay
- Pleonosporium caribaeun
- Spyridia hypmoides south of Black Rock
- Wrangelia argus
- Wrangelia pinicillata
- Dasya stanleyi
- Acrosorium ciliolatum
- Augophyllum marginifructum north from Leadsman shoal
- Bartoniella crenata south of Mission Rocks
- Martensia elegans south from Sodwana Bay
- Martensia flabelliformis Sodwana Bay
- cf. Myriogramma prostrata Sodwana Bay
- Acrocystis nana north from Island Rock
- Amansia rhodantha
- Bostrychia tenella
- Chondria armata
- Digenea simplex north of Mission Rocks
- Halopithys subopaca north from Mapelane
- Laurencia brongniartii
- Laurencia complanata
- Laurencia natalensis
- Laurencia pumila
- Neurymenia fraxinifolia
- Neurymenia nigricans north from St. Lucia
- Osmundaria melvillii north from Sodwana Bay
- Osmundaria serrata south of Mission Rocks
- Placophora binderi
- Plectrophora natalensis
- Polysiphonia incompta
- Polyzonia elegans
- Rhodomelopsis africana

==== Endemism ====
The MPA is in the tropical Delagoa ecoregion in the north of kwaZulu-Natal, which extends from Cape Vidal northwards into Mozambique. There are some species endemic to South Africa along this coastline.

== Threats ==
High levels of fishing in the reserve are a threat to the population of some species.

Coral bleaching events: When the large mass coral bleaching event occurred in the Western Indian Ocean in 1998, reefs in the northern region off Kenya, the Maldives and Seychelles lost extensive coral cover, but severity decreased to the south and there was very little on the reefs of the MPA. There was a suggestion that the South African reefs could constitute refugia from climate change, but in 2005 an anomalous warm-water event caused moderate bleaching on these reefs. As this was the first time such bleaching had been observed in this area, there is little data available on the environmental stress, resistance, adaptation and community changes of these reefs, and a long term monitoring project has been started.

It has been hypothesised that the small-scale, local upwelling events caused by canyons along the shelf-edge may have an effect on the corals, but it is unknown whether this is protective, by cooling the water, or whether acclimatisation to cooler water makes the corals more sensitive to raised sea temperatures. Consequently, a monitoring program for water temperature has been started.

== Slipways and harbours in the MPA ==
There are no harbours or slipways. Beach launches through the surf are standard procedure for fishing and dive boats.

== See also ==
Marine protected areas of South Africa
- iSimangaliso Wetland Park – South Africa's third-largest protected area, spanning 280 km of coastline
- List of protected areas of South Africa
- Marine protected areas of South Africa – Protected areas of coastline or ocean in the EEZ of South Africa
- Sodwana Bay – Bay of the Indian Ocean on the northern KwaZulu-Natal coast of South Africa
- Sodwana Bay National Park – National park in northern KwaZulu-Natal, South Africa
