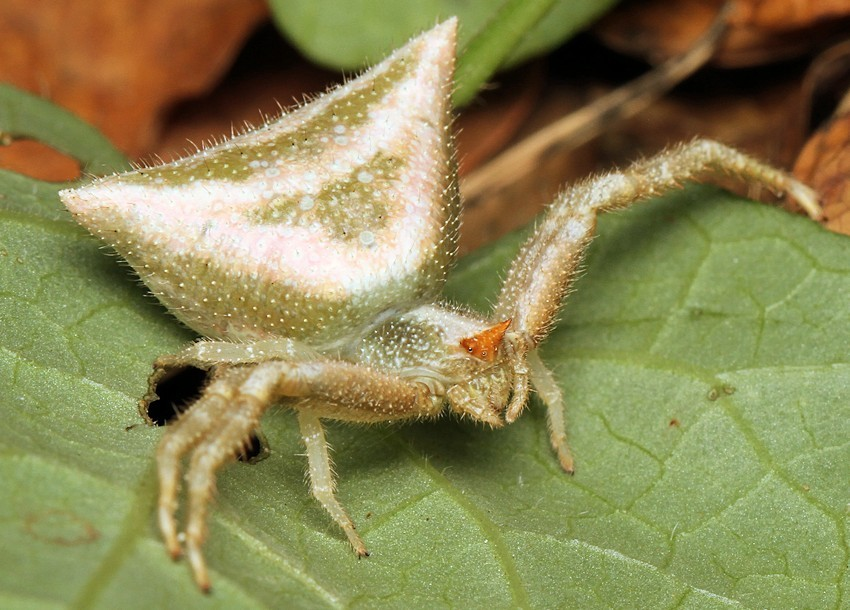
- female
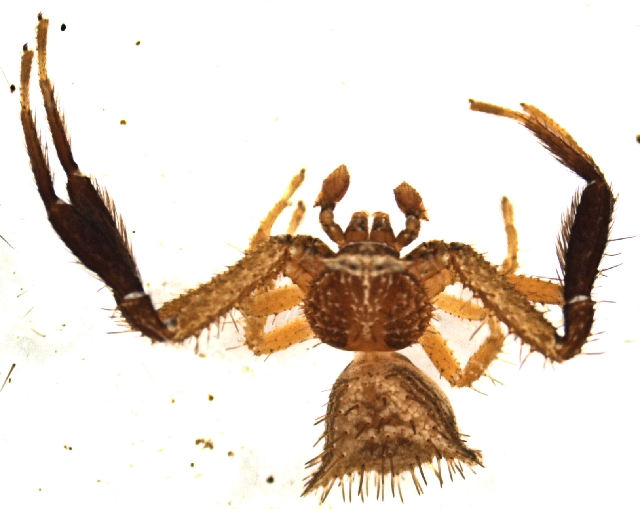
- male

Scientific classification
- Kingdom: Animalia
- Phylum: Arthropoda
- Subphylum: Chelicerata
- Class: Arachnida
- Order: Araneae
- Infraorder: Araneomorphae
- Family: Thomisidae
- Genus: Thomisus
- Species: T. granulatus

Binomial name
- Thomisus granulatus Karsch, 1880

Synonyms
- Thomisus hystrix Lawrence, 1947; Thomisus lawrencei Roewer, 1951

= Thomisus granulatus =

Hairy Thomisus crab spider

Species of spider

Thomisus granulatus is a species of crab spider in the family Thomisidae. It is commonly known as the hairy Thomisus crab spider and is native to southern and eastern Africa.

== Etymology ==
The specific epithet granulatus is derived from Latin granulum, meaning "small grain", referring to the granular or textured appearance of the spider's surface.

== Distribution ==
Thomisus granulatus has been recorded from six African countries: Zambia, Malawi, Namibia, Botswana, South Africa, and Eswatini. In South Africa, the species is found across six provinces, at elevations ranging from 4 to 1,842 metres above sea level.

Within South Africa, the species has been documented from numerous locations including the Eastern Cape, Gauteng, KwaZulu-Natal, Limpopo, Mpumalanga, and the Western Cape. It has been recorded from various protected areas including Kruger National Park, iSimangaliso Wetland Park, and several nature reserves.

== Habitat ==
Thomisus granulatus is a free-living species found on plants and has been sampled from most floral biomes in South Africa, with the exception of the desert, Nama, and Succulent Karoo biomes. The species has also been documented in citrus orchards, indicating its adaptability to agricultural environments.

== Description ==
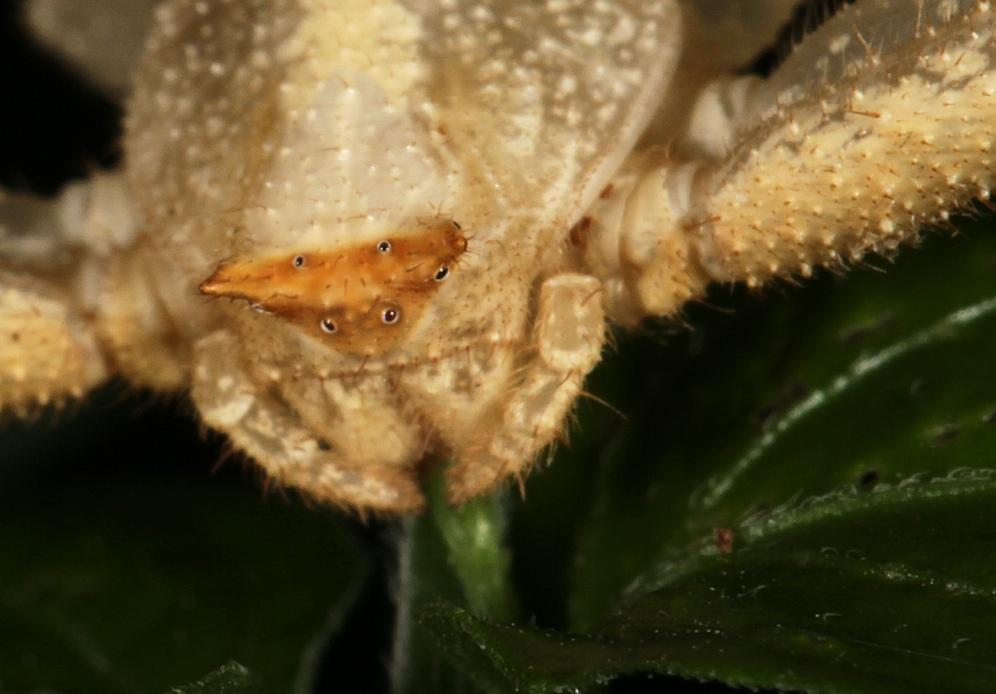
face

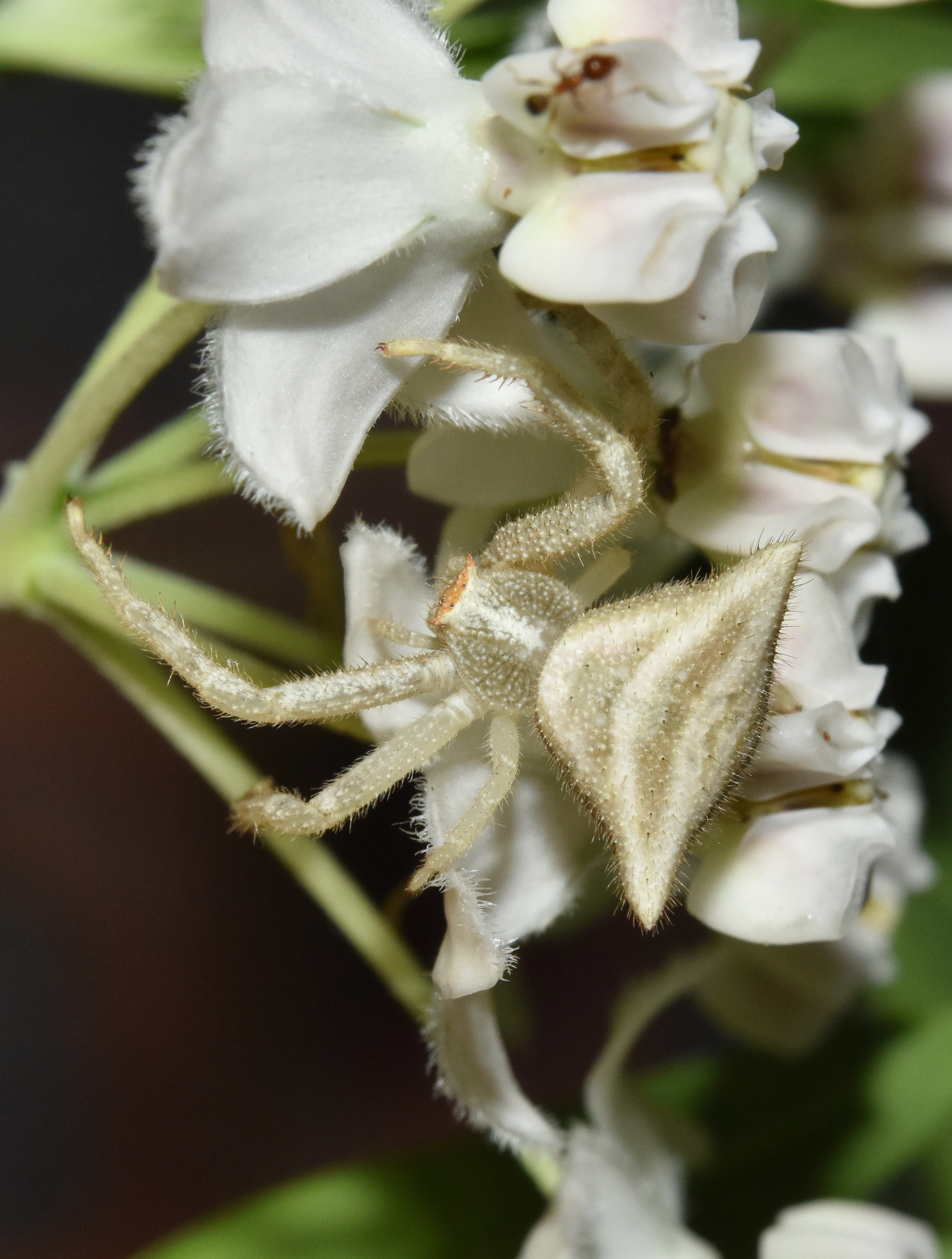
in white flowers

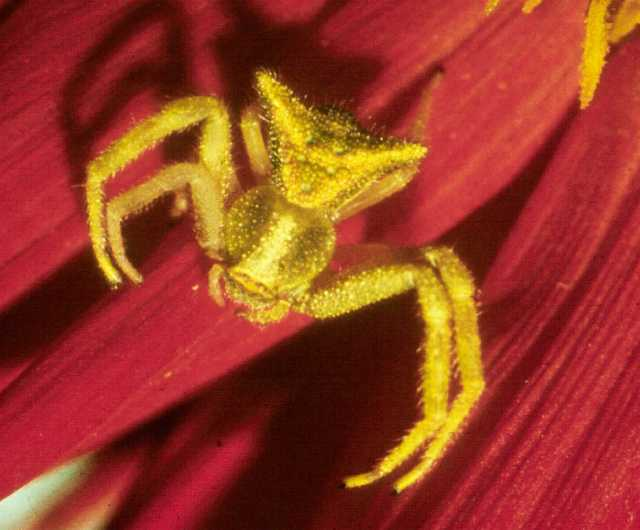

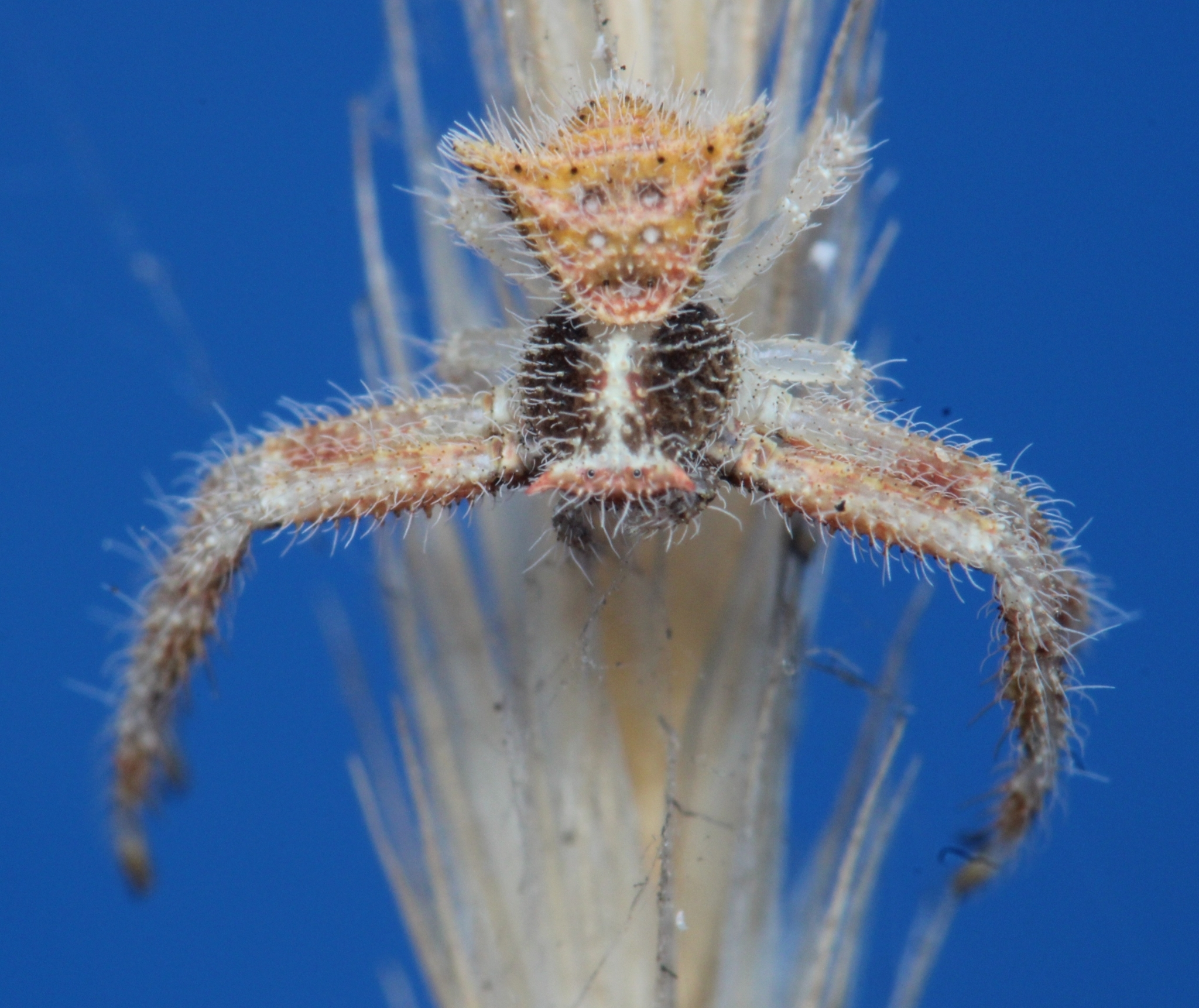
showing hairiness

Thomisus granulatus exhibits the typical crab spider morphology with a flattened body and legs held in a crab-like posture. As the common name suggests, this species is characterized by its notably hairy appearance.

Females are generally larger than males, as is typical for most spider species.

The species can be distinguished from other Thomisus species by specific morphological characteristics of both the male palp and female epigyne, though detailed identification typically requires microscopic examination.

== Taxonomy ==
Thomisus granulatus was first described by German arachnologist Ferdinand Karsch in 1880. The species underwent taxonomic revision by Dippenaar-Schoeman in 1983, who synonymized Thomisus hystrix sensu Lawrence (1947) and T. lawrencei Roewer (1951) with T. granulatus. The name T. hystrix was originally preoccupied by Nicolet (1849), leading Roewer to propose the replacement name T. lawrencei in 1951.

== Conservation status ==
Thomisus granulatus is classified as Least Concern due to its wide geographical range across multiple African countries. The species is found in more than ten protected areas and faces no known specific threats. No conservation actions are currently recommended for this species.
