= Pseudamia hayashii =

Conservation status
- Least Concern (IUCN 3.1)

Scientific classification
- Kingdom: Animalia
- Phylum: Chordata
- Class: Actinopterygii
- Division: Teleostei
- Order: Gobiiformes
- Family: Apogonidae
- Genus: Pseudamia
- Species: P. hayashii

Binomial name
- Pseudamia hayashii J. E. Randall, Lachner & T. H. Fraser, 1985

Species of fish

Pseudamia hayashii, Hayashi's cardinalfish, is a species of marine ray-finned fish belonging to the family Apogonidae, the cardinalfishes. This cardinalfish has an extensive Indo-Pacific distribution.

== Taxonomy ==
Pseudamia hayashii was first formally described in 1985 by the American ichthyologists John Ernest Randall, Ernest A. Lachner and Thomas Henry Fraser with its type locality given as a coral reef with caves off western end of Ngargol Island, Palau Islands, from a depth of 6.1 to 12.2 m (20 to 40 ft). This species is classified in the genus Pseudamia. which was described in 1865 by Pieter Bleeker with its type species by monotypy being Cheilodipterus polystigma. The genus Pseudamia is the only genus in what was then the monotypic subfamily Pseudamiinae within the family Apogonidae.

== Etymology ==
Pseudamia hayashii is classified in the genus Pseudamia, which has the prefix pseudo- meaning "false", and allausion Bleeker did not explain, with Amia, a non binomial name originally coined by Laurens Theodorus Gronovius for the genus Apogon which is now used as a common suffix for genus names within the cardinalfish family. It is thought that Bleeker used pseudo- to refer to the close relationship between this genus and Amia. The specific name, hayashii, honours the Japanese Museum curator and ichthyologist Masayoshi Hayashi of the Yokosuka City Museum, who loaned Randall, Lachner and Fraser a specimen of this species when he found out about their research on the genus Pseudamia.

== Description ==
Pseudamia hayashii has an elongated body with a compressed cross section and it reaches a maximum total length of 10 cm (3.9 in). This species is translucent with a reddish tint, with some iridescence especiallly on the abdomen and gill cover, this is largely golden hued; the rhomboidal caudal fin is dusky with a hyaline border; the other median fins are pale to dusky or blackish, paired fins are clear with pink rays. The first dorsal fin contains 6 spines, the second dorsal fin has 1 spine and 8 soft rays while the anal fin has 2 spines and 8 rays.

== Distribution and habitat ==
Pseudamia hayashii is found in the Red Sea, Kenya to Sodwana Bay in South Africa, Comoro Islands, Seychelles, Mauritius, Aldabra and Chagos Archipelago; east into the Pacific Ocean, north to Japan, south to Australia and east as far as French Polynesia. It lives down to depths of 64 m (210 ft) on reefs along the coasts, in lagoons and on their outer walls.
