= Ponta do Ouro-Kosi Bay Transfrontier Conservation Area =

Protected area in South Africa and Mozambique

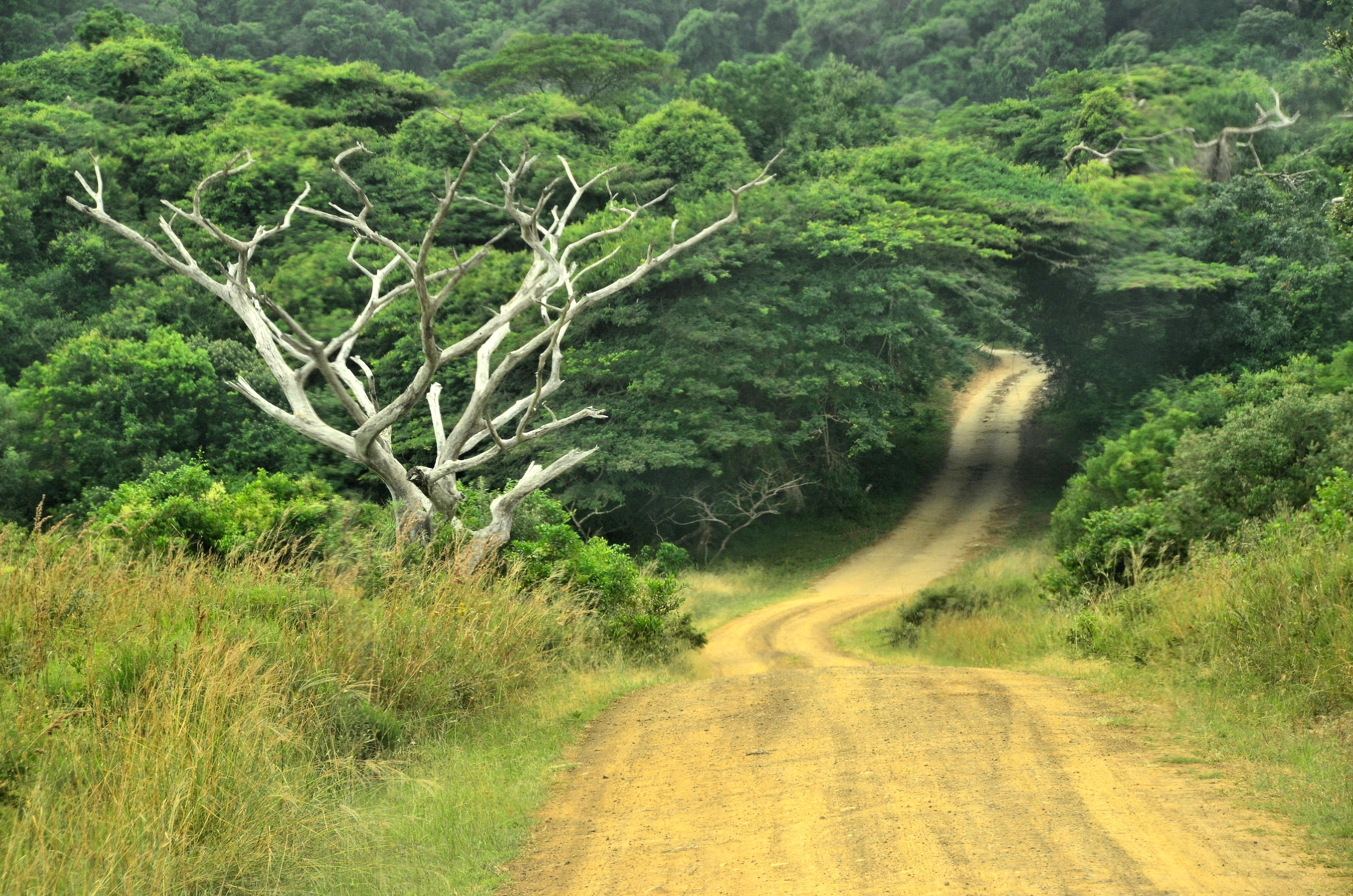
- Road through the iSimangaliso Wetland Park
- Location: South Africa, Mozambique

Ponta do Ouro-Kosi Bay Transfrontier Conservation Area (KwaZulu-Natal)

Ponta do Ouro-Kosi Bay Transfrontier Conservation Area (TFCA) is a larger conservation area conceived as an extension of the existing conservation parkland area of the iSimangaliso Wetland Park, to extend north into a similar area on the Mozambique side of the border, and including several other parks in the process. The parks to be included (in addition to one or two others) are:

- ISimangaliso Wetland Park (South Africa).
- Cape Vidal Game Reserve (South Africa).
- Mkuze Game Reserve (South Africa).
- Sodwana Game Reserve (South Africa).
- Muputoland Marine Protected Area (South Africa).
- Kosi Bay Nature Reserve (South Africa).
- Maputo Protection Area (Mozambique).

== See also ==
- Protected areas of South Africa
- List of World Heritage Sites in Africa
- List of conservation areas of Mozambique
