= St Lucia Game Reserve =

St Lucia Game Reserve is part of the St Lucia Estuary and with that the focal point of the iSimangaliso Wetland Park, in the KwaZulu-Natal province of South Africa. The game reserve was established in 1895.

== See also ==
- Protected areas of South Africa
