= Sodwana Bay =

Bay of the Indian Ocean on the northern KwaZulu-Natal coast of South Africa

- Sodwanabaai (Afrikaans)
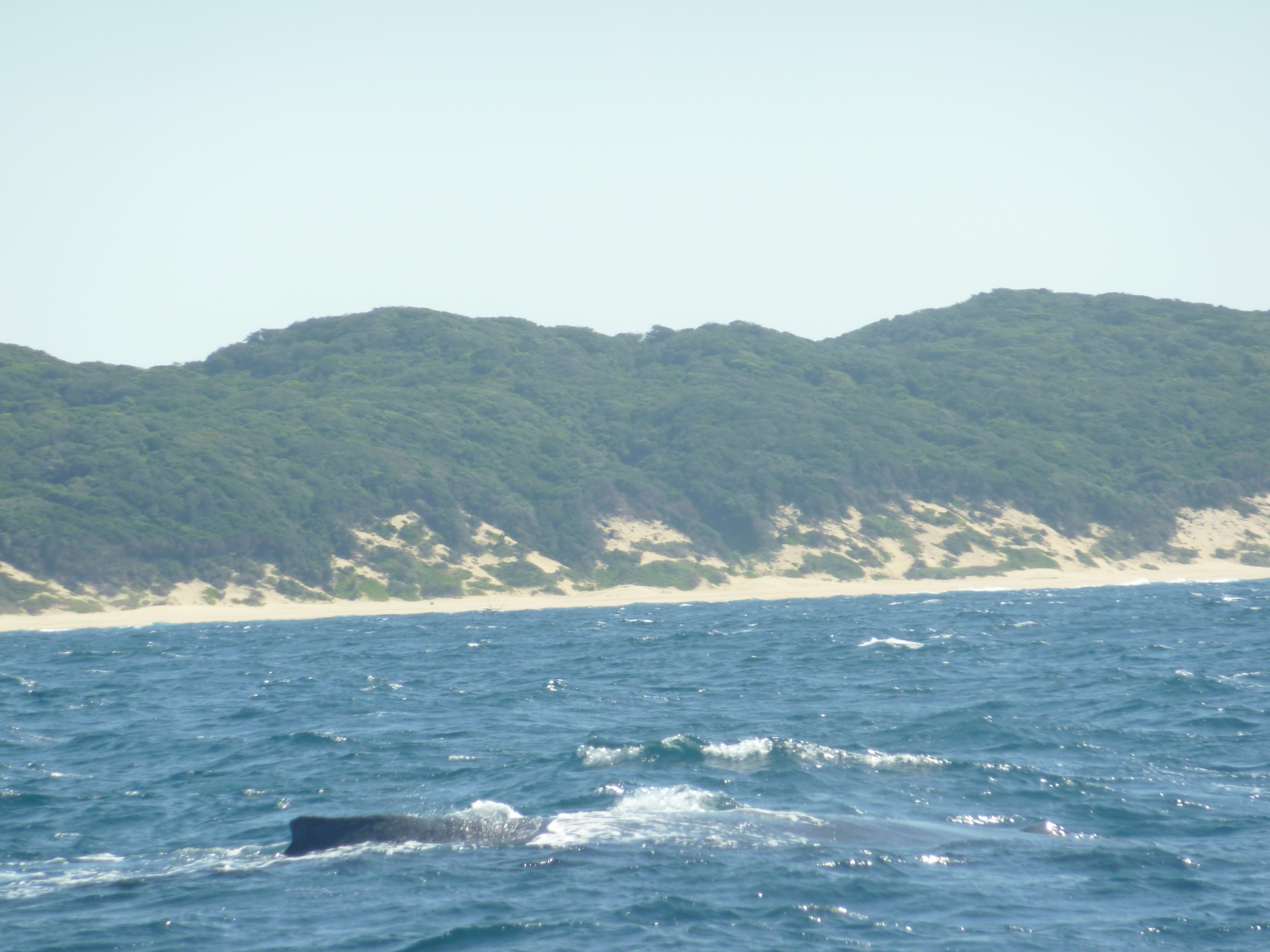
- View of a beach in the bay with a humpback whale in the foreground

- Location in South Africa
- Coordinates: 27°32′S 32°41′E
- Ocean/sea sources: Indian Ocean
- Basin countries: South Africa

Sodwana Bay is a bay in South Africa on the KwaZulu Natal north coast, between Greater St. Lucia Wetland Park and Lake Sibhayi. It is within the Sodwana Bay National Park and the Maputaland Marine Reserve, and is a popular SCUBA diving destination. "Sodwana Bay" is commonly used to refer not only to the marine reserve, but to the terrestrial park and to the geographical bay as well.

Sodwana Bay National Park is a narrow strip of forested sand dunes located along the east coast. Proclaimed a South African national park in the 1950s, it is frequented by anglers and divers. Sodwana is situated in the Maputaland Marine Protected Area, and is the only recreational scuba diving area along the Greater St Lucia Wetlands Park (now renamed to iSimangaliso) coastline. Classified as one of the top dive sites in the world, the park is visited by some 35,000 scuba divers per year. The bay is near the southern end of the tropical western Indo-Pacific marine ecoregion. A sizeable area of coral reef is present, acting as a marine habitat for a diverse number of native and migratory fish and other sorts of marine life. Several undersea canyons exist, cutting into the edge of the continental shelf (which is very close to the shoreline).

Sailfish, king mackerel, and other pelagic species of game fish migrate south, down the east coast of Africa, and off of the coast of northeast Africa; this migration reachrd all the way south, to off the coast of South Africa, re-establishing Sodwana as a sport fishing destination for pelagic species. The marine protected area is known for endangered species of marine megafauna including whale sharks, great white sharks, bull sharks (zambezi sharks), hammerhead sharks, blacktip sharks, manta rays, orange-spotted groupers, potato cod, critically endangered leatherback turtles, loggerhead sea turtles, and coelacanths. The discovery of Coelacanths in the area made the region world-famous.National Geographic's March 2011 issue included a short article entitled Ancient Swimmers, discussing the discovery of coelacanths in the depths of Sodwana Bay and the Bay's surrounding area. The NatGeo article elucidates:

"Since this chance sighting, Latimeria chalumnae have been found in several pockets in and around the Indian Ocean. No one knows how many there are - maybe as few as 1,000 or as many as 10,000. Because of the depth of their habitat, they have mainly been photographed by submersible … vehicles. Divers first documented the fish [L. chalumnae] [in Sodwana Bay] in 2000; in January and February 2010, a specially trained team dived to take pictures of [another] small colony in Sodwana Bay, South Africa."

Whale watching targeting migratory or resident cetaceans is a local tourist industry. Bottlenose dolphins live in the vicinity and have been observed to swim with whale sharks. Humpback whales migrate through the bay during winter to spring seasons while southern right whales and other species of whales are less common. Orcas may also visit the bay waters.

The land areas of the iSimangaliso Wetland Park are home to species of large land animals such as lions, giraffes, elephants, hippopotamuses and rhinoceros

== Climate ==
The climate is subtropical with water temperatures usually above 20 °C (68 °F), up to 29 °C (84 °F) in summer.

== Ecology ==
=== Terrestrial ===
Map of the Ecoregions of South Africa

=== Marine ===
Sodwana is in the Delagoa coastal ecoregion

The inshore waters of Sodwana Bay are in the Delagoa coastal marine ecoregion.

== Economy ==
The local economy is based on tourism.

=== Tourism ===
Tourism in this area is based on recreational scuba diving, gamefishing and game park tours.

==== Recreational diving ====
A permit is required to scuba dive in any MPA in South Africa, including the recreational dive sites of the iSimangaliso Marine Protected Area. These permits are valid for a year and are available at some branches of the Post Office. Temporary permits, valid for a month, may be available at dive shops or from dive boat operators who operate in an MPA. A personal recreational scuba diving permit is valid in all South African MPAs where recreational diving is allowed. The business permit to operate recreational scuba business operations in an MPA is restricted to a specific MPA. Diving for commercial or scientific purposes is also subject to permit.

Several snorkelling spots, and a large number of scuba diving sites are available for recreational diving. Several dive operators are based in Sodwana, and equipment and gas fill are available. Diving conditions are generally good throughout the year, but the best visibility of up to 30 metres is most likely during April to September. In suitable weather night dives can be arranged.

Dive sites are concentrated at the following areas:

- Two-mile Reef is the most popular area with depths ranging from 9 metres to over 30 metres at the outer edge.
- Quarter Mile Reef is most often dived in January and February when Ragged-toothed sharks congregate.
- Stringer Reef at a depth of 14 metres is a small reef with great diversity of species.
- Four and Five Mile Reefs are about 8 km (5.0 mi) from Jesser Point. They are a bit deeper, and have branching, table and plate corals
- Seven Mile Reef is the area about 11 km (6.8 mi) north of Jesser Point. There are overhangs, drop-offs and mushroom reefs.
- Nine Mile Reef is the northern-most reef of the commonly accessible areas. Depths range from 6 to 21 metres. There is a green tree coral at the drop-off on the seaward side of the reef.
- Coelacanth dives at the canyon require a special permit and certification and competence in trimix diving to depths of over 100 m.

== Gallery ==
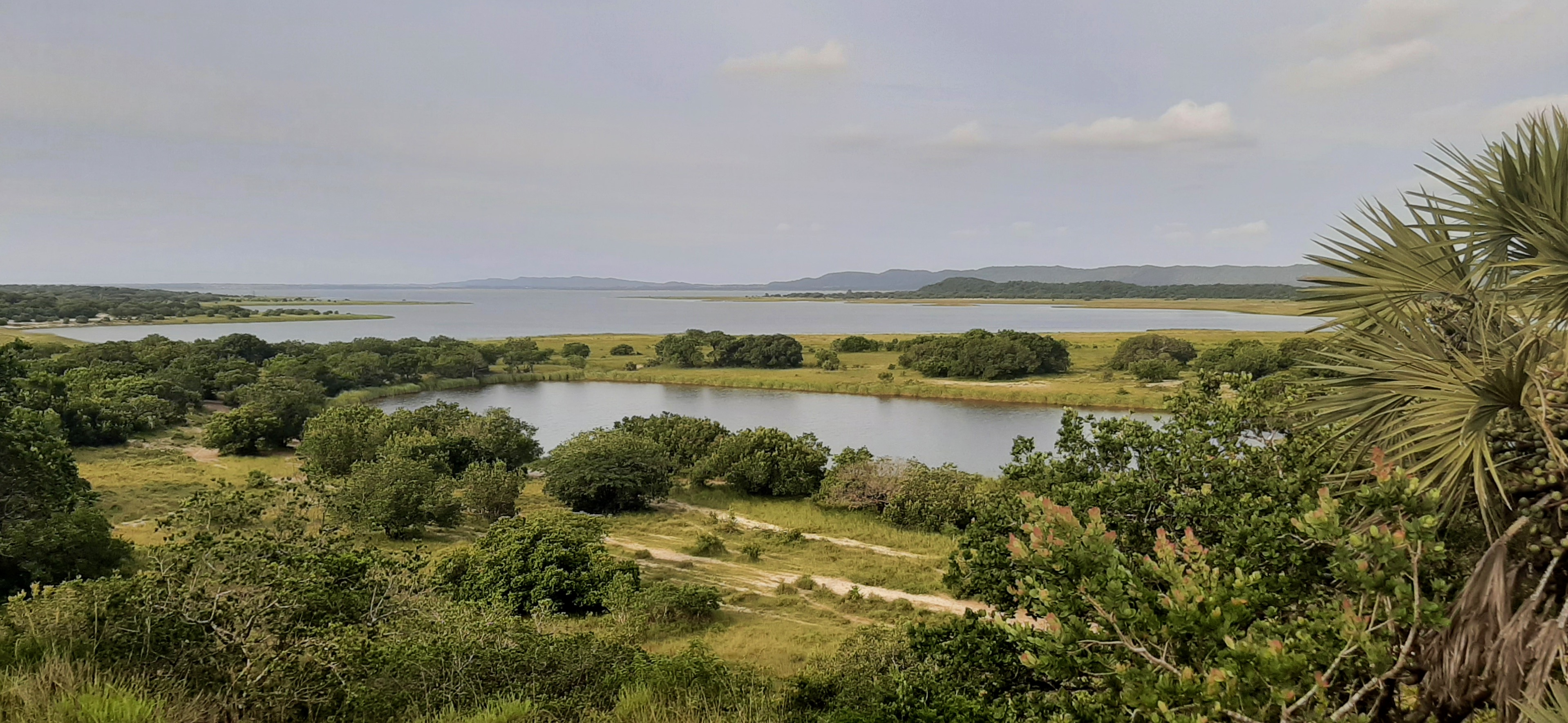
View over Mgobezeleni Lagoon towards Sodwana Bay

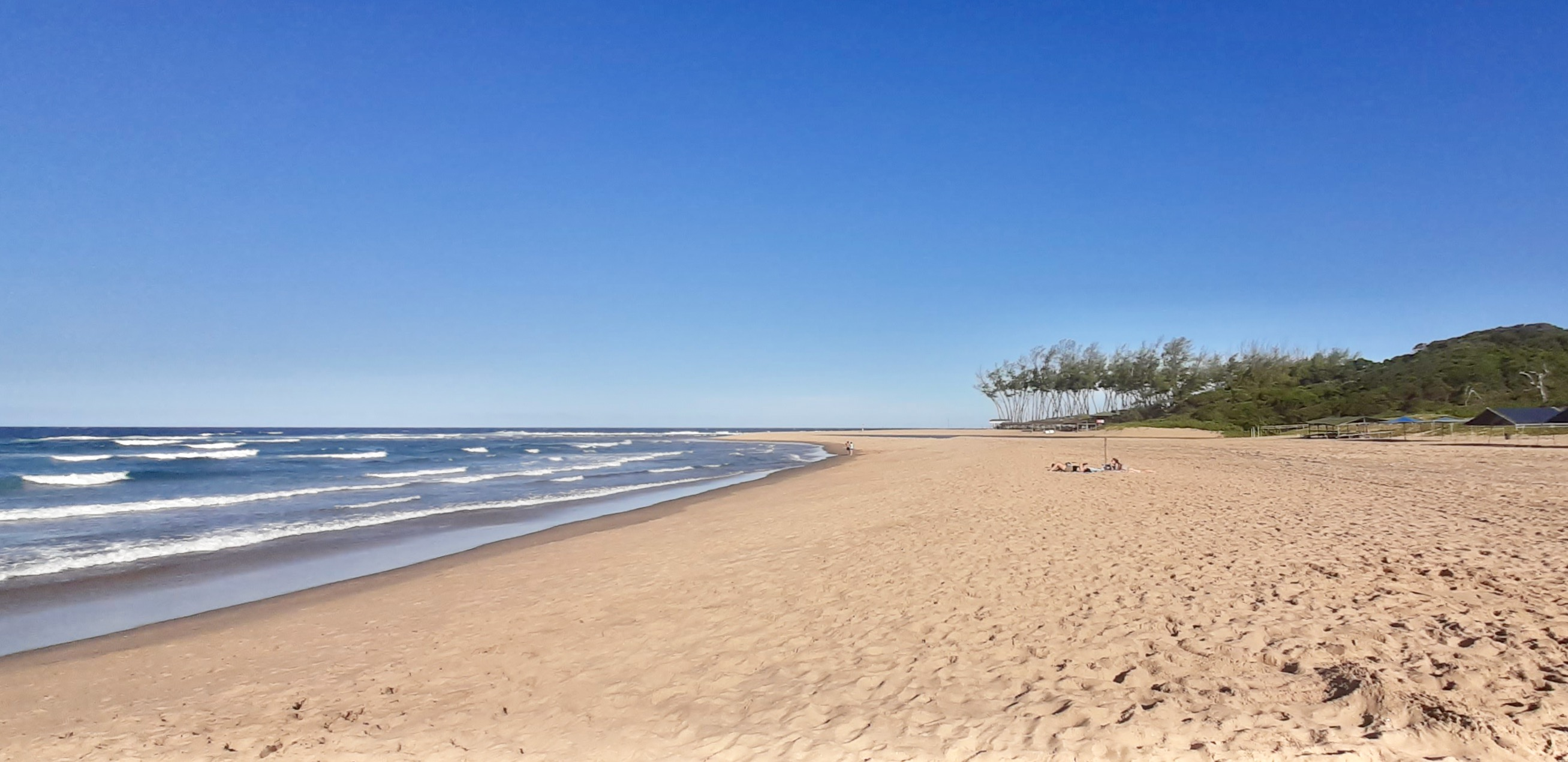
Sodwana beach

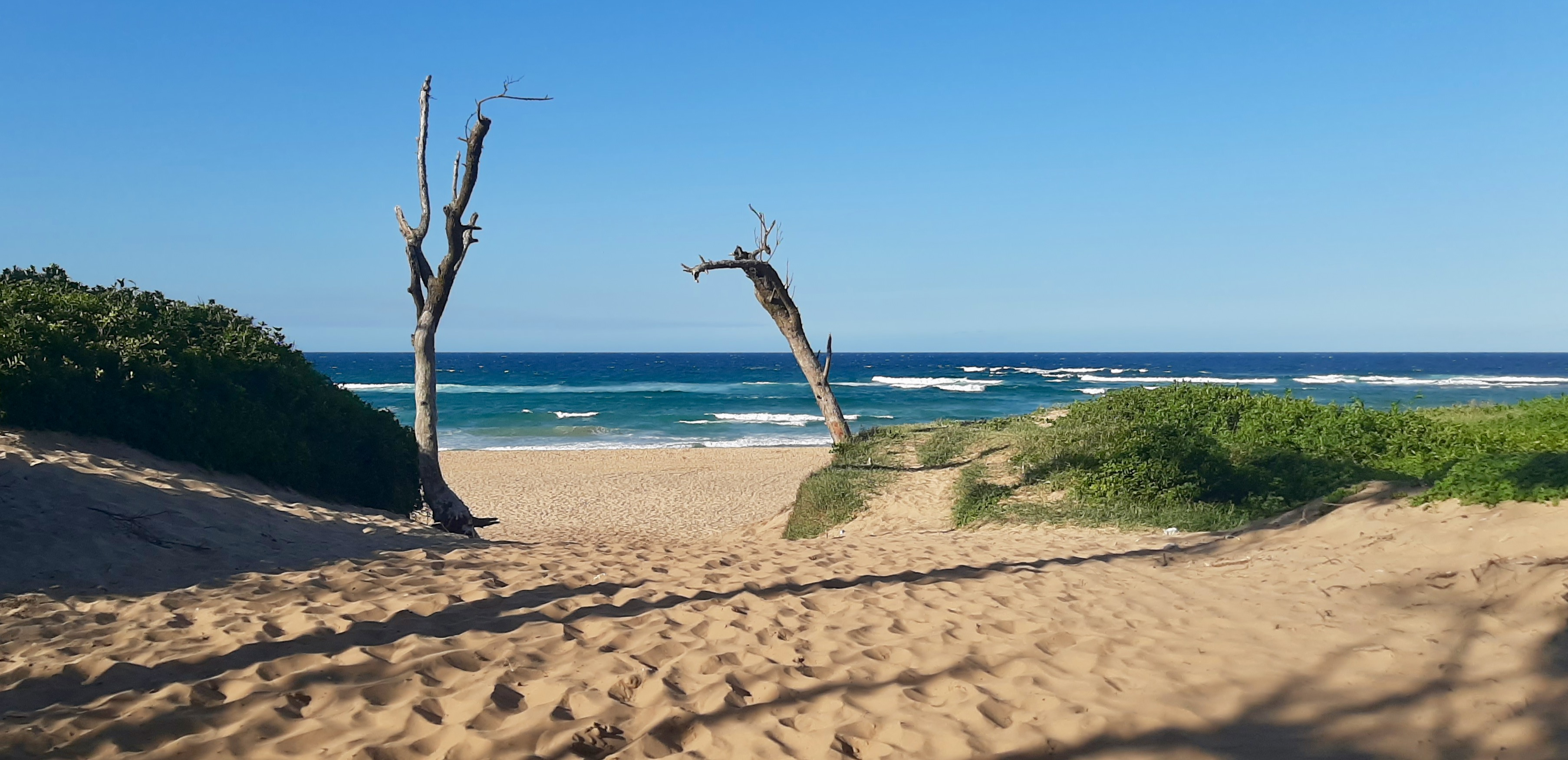
