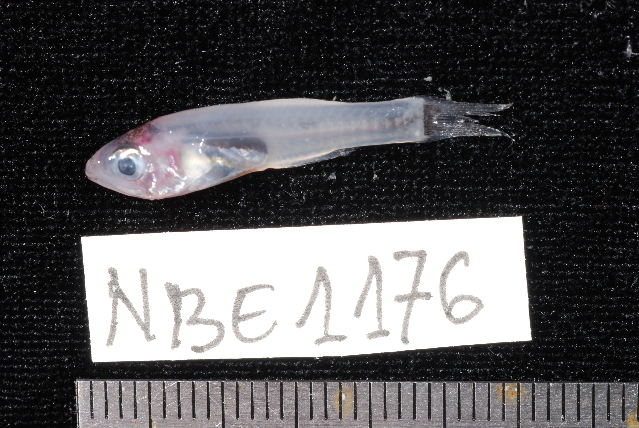
- Gymnapogon africanus

Scientific classification
- Kingdom: Animalia
- Phylum: Chordata
- Class: Actinopterygii
- Order: Gobiiformes
- Family: Apogonidae
- Subfamily: Pseudaminae; J. L. B. Smith, 1954

= Pseudaminae =

Subfamily of fishes

The Pseudaminae is a subfamily of ray-finned fishes, one of two subfamilies of the family Apogonidae, the cardinalfishes. They are characterised by having large caniform teeth which are placed on the on dentary and premaxillae, by having the lateral line absent or incomplete, by having no scales or if scales are present they are cycloid. One species, Gymnapogon urospilotus, is notable for its larvae being rather large and fast-swimming.

== Genera ==
Four genera make up the subfamily Pseudaminae:

- Gymnapogon Regan, 1905
- Paxton C. C. Baldwin & G. D. Johnson, 1999
- Pseudamia Bleeker, 1865
- Pseudamiops J. L. B. Smith, 1954
