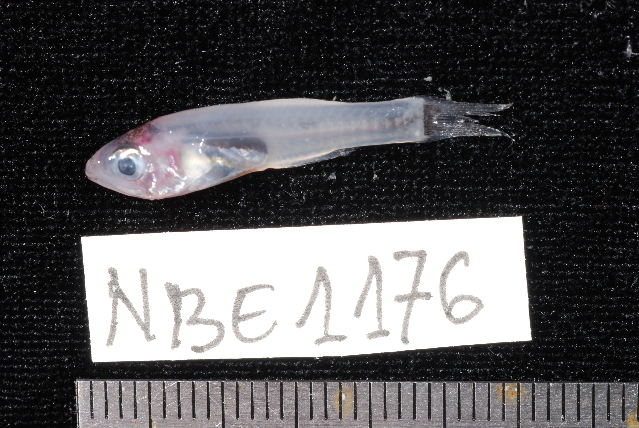
- Gymnapogon africanus

Scientific classification
- Kingdom: Animalia
- Phylum: Chordata
- Class: Actinopterygii
- Order: Gobiiformes
- Family: Apogonidae
- Subfamily: Pseudaminae
- Genus: Gymnapogon; Regan, 1905

Type species
- Gymnapogon japonicus Regan, 1905

Synonyms
- Acanthapogon Fowler, 1938; Australaphia Whitley, 1936; Henicichthys Tanaka, 1915

= Gymnapogon =

Genus of fishes

Gymnapogon is a genus of fish in the family Apogonidae. They are native to the Indo-West Pacific and central Pacific Oceans, where they occur in reefs and nearby habitat types. These species are usually no more than 5 centimeters long and have semitransparent bodies without scales. The genus name is a compound noun formed by combining the Greek gymnos meaning "naked", referring to the lack of scales in the type species, Gymnapogon japonicus, and Apogon, the type genus of the Apogonidae. One species, the B-spot cardinalfish (Gymnapogon urospilotus), is notable for its larvae being rather large, conspicuous and fast-swimming.

== Species ==
There are currently 9 recognized species in this genus:

- Gymnapogon africanus J. L. B. Smith, 1954 (Crystal cardinalfish)
- Gymnapogon annona (Whitley, 1936) (Naked cardinalfish)
- Gymnapogon foraminosus (S. Tanaka (I), 1915)
- Gymnapogon janus T. H. Fraser, 2016
- Gymnapogon japonicus Regan, 1905
- Gymnapogon melanogaster Gon & Golani, 2002
- Gymnapogon philippinus (Herre, 1939) (Philippines cardinalfish)
- Gymnapogon urospilotus Lachner, 1953 (B-spot cardinalfish)
- Gymnapogon vanderbilti (Fowler, 1938) (Vanderbilt's cardinalfish)
