= Pseudamiops =

Scientific classification
- Kingdom: Animalia
- Phylum: Chordata
- Class: Actinopterygii
- Order: Gobiiformes
- Family: Apogonidae
- Subfamily: Pseudaminae
- Genus: Pseudamiops; J. L. B. Smith, 1954

Type species
- Pseudamiops pellucidus J. L. B. Smith, 1954

Synonyms
- Lachneria Smith, 1954

Genus of fishes

Pseudamiops is a genus of cardinalfishes native to the Pacific and Indian oceans.

== Species ==
There are currently 5 recognized species in this genus:

- Pseudamiops diaphanes J. E. Randall, 1998 (Transparent cardinalfish)
- Pseudamiops gracilicauda (Lachner, 1953) (Graceful-tailed cardinalfish)
- Pseudamiops pellucidus J. L. B. Smith, 1954 (Limpid cardinalfish)
- Pseudamiops phasma J. E. Randall, 2001
- Pseudamiops springeri Gon & Bogorodsky, 2013
