= Pseudamia =

Scientific classification
- Kingdom: Animalia
- Phylum: Chordata
- Class: Actinopterygii
- Order: Gobiiformes
- Family: Apogonidae
- Subfamily: Pseudaminae
- Genus: Pseudamia; Bleeker, 1865

Type species
- Cheilodipterus polystigma, a synonym of Pseudamia amblyuroptera Bleeker, 1860

Genus of fishes

Pseudamia is a genus of cardinalfishes native to the Indian and Pacific oceans.

== Species ==
There are currently 7 recognized species in this genus:

- Pseudamia amblyuroptera (Bleeker, 1856) (White-jawed cardinalfish)
- Pseudamia gelatinosa J. L. B. Smith, 1956 (Gelatinous cardinalfish)
- Pseudamia hayashii J. E. Randall, Lachner & T. H. Fraser, 1985 (Hayashi's cardinalfish)
- Pseudamia nigra G. R. Allen, 1992 (Estuary cardinalfish)
- Pseudamia rubra J. E. Randall & H. Ida, 1993
- Pseudamia tarri J. E. Randall, Lachner & T. H. Fraser, 1985 (Tarr's cardinalfish)
- Pseudamia zonata J. E. Randall, Lachner & T. H. Fraser, 1985 (Paddlefish cardinalfish)
