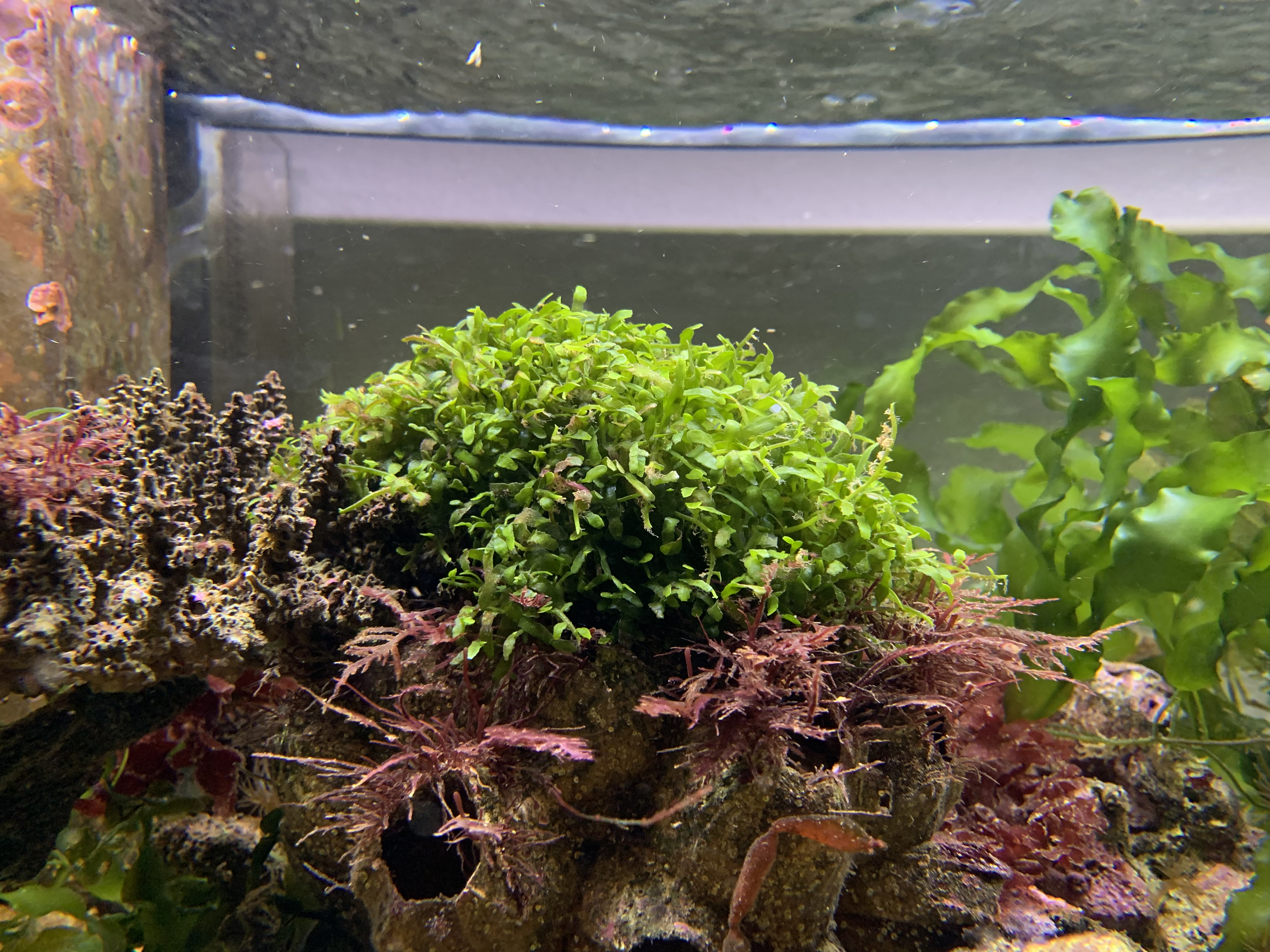
- Caulerpa brachypus in a marine aquarium.

Scientific classification
- Domain: Eukaryota
- Supergroup: Archaeplastida
- Clade: Viridiplantae
- Division: Chlorophyta
- Class: Ulvophyceae
- Order: Bryopsidales
- Family: Caulerpaceae
- Genus: Caulerpa
- Species: C. brachypus

Binomial name
- Caulerpa brachypus Harv.

= Caulerpa brachypus =

Species of seaweed

Caulerpa brachypus is a species of seaweed in the Caulerpaceae family. It was first described in 1860 by the Irish botanist William Henry Harvey, having been collected during the North Pacific Exploring and Surveying Expedition of 1853 to 1856. It is native to the Indo-Pacific region and has spread elsewhere. It is regarded as an invasive species in the United States, Martinique and New Zealand.

== Description ==
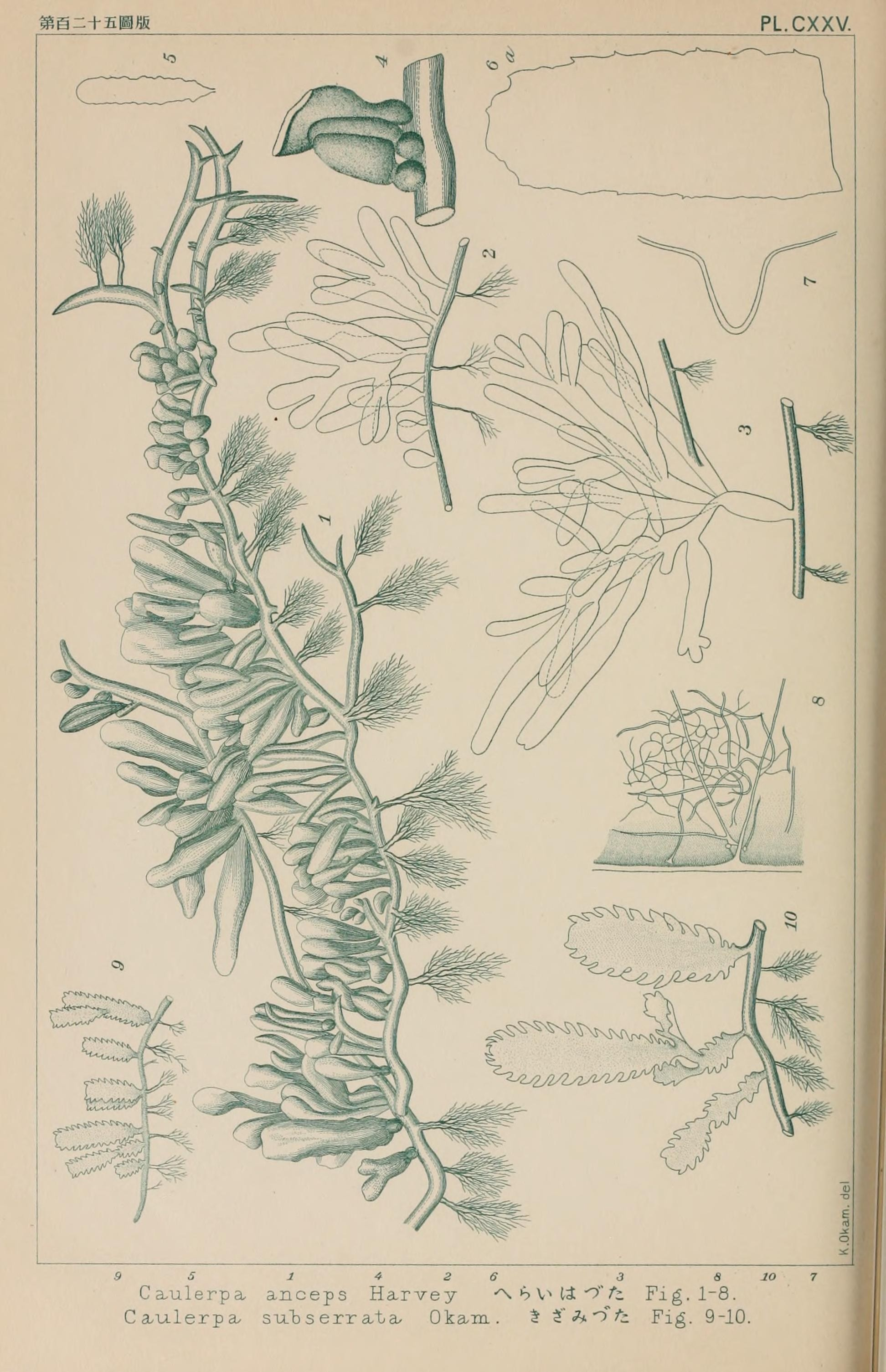
Illustrations of Caulerpa brachypus.

Caulerpa brachypus is a green seaweed with a horizontal creeping stolon which sends up blade-like fronds on short rhizoids at intervals. These thalli are tongue-like or strap-like in shape, up to 5 cm (2 in) long and mainly green, sometimes with yellowish margins. Where they occur together, it is difficult to distinguish this species from other members of the genus Caulerpa, especially as there is considerable variation between different populations of Caulerpa brachypus growing in different habitats. Where conditions suit it, it can become very profuse and form dense stands.

== Distribution ==
Caulerpa brachypus is native to the tropical and subtropical Indo-Pacific region. Its range includes East Africa, India, southeastern and eastern Asia, the Pacific Islands and Western Australia. It is found along the Western Australia coast scattered over a large area in the Pilbara region between Exmouth and Port Hedland.

It was first detected in the United States, in Martin County, Florida, in 1999 and had spread to the Indian River Lagoon by 2003.

In New Zealand, C. brachypus and C. parvifolia were first reported at Great Barrier Island in July 2021 via an iNaturalist observation. As of 2026, these exotic caulerpa species have been detected across multiple locations across the Hauraki Gulf, the Coromandel and Northland, including locations such as Great Mercury Island and the Goat Island Marine Reserve.

It is considered an invasive species in the United States, Martinique (in the Caribbean) and New Zealand.

== Ecology ==
It is probable that sexual reproduction in this species is similar to other members of the genus. However a much more common means of dispersal involves asexual reproduction, with fragments of the plant breaking off and re-establishing themselves elsewhere. In its native surroundings, this seaweed is kept in check by herbivorous fish but in Florida, few if any fish feed on it and it can flourish on off-shore reefs, reducing biodiversity. It is intolerant of bright light, growing best in shaded positions, being mostly found in the 25 to 47 m (80 to 150 ft) depth range where there is less light than at the surface. Where the water is turbid, it flourishes in shallower habitats.

== Invasiveness ==
In Florida, this seaweed has been dubbed the "killer algae". First recorded in the state in 1999, by 2003 it had shown explosive growth and spread widely, with some near shore reefs in Palm Beach County becoming so overwhelmed that fish and lobsters were no longer present. During hurricanes in 2004, it was scoured from the rocky reefs and disappeared, but over the next few years, it became re-established, once more forming dense stands. It is thought to become so abundant on Florida's coast because of the sewage outflows which result in extra nutrients being present in the water. Such extensive algal cover is likely to kill corals, sponges and other sessile invertebrates, and force more mobile organisms to move elsewhere.
