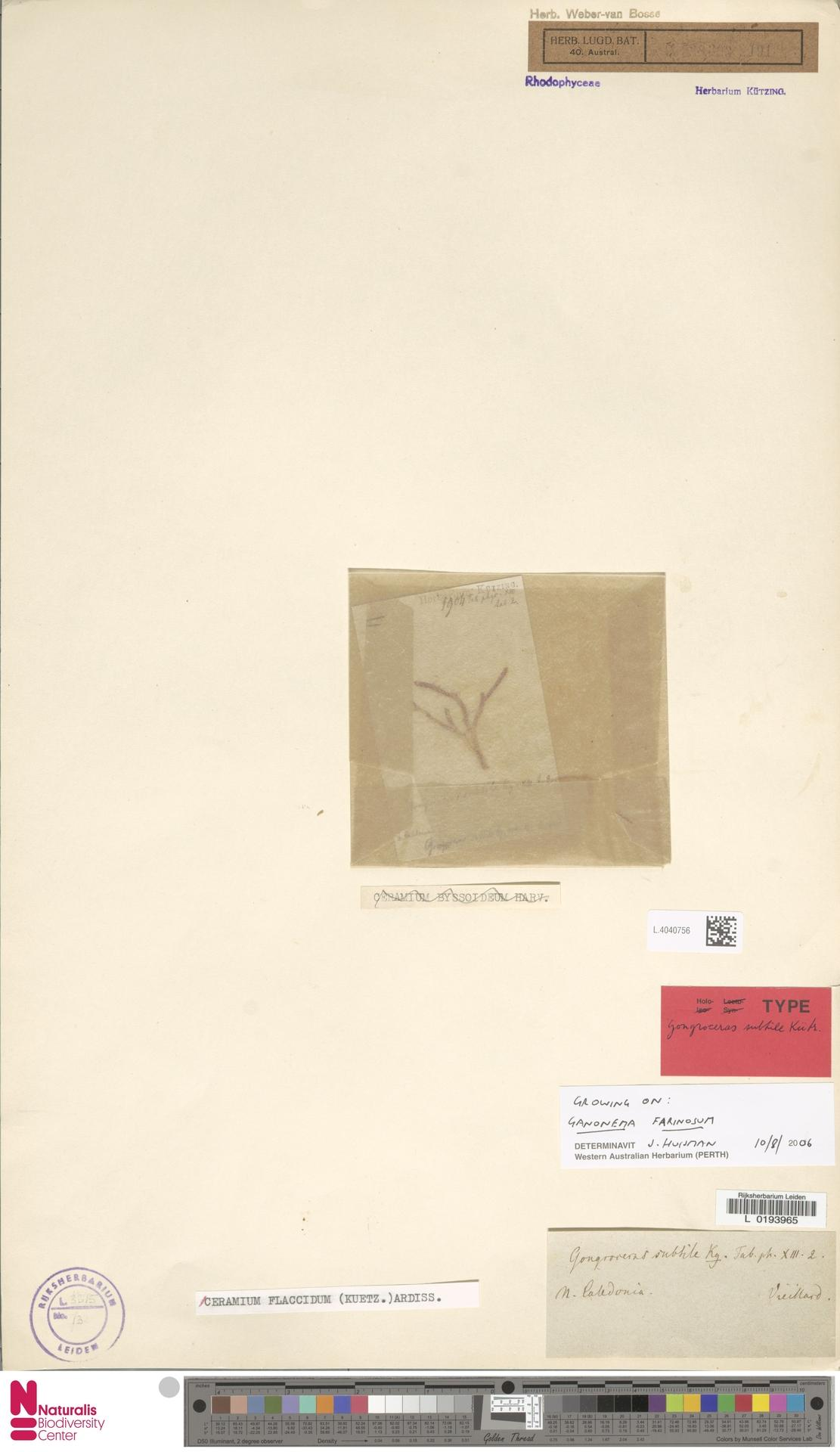

Scientific classification
- Clade: Archaeplastida
- Division: Rhodophyta
- Class: Florideophyceae
- Order: Ceramiales
- Family: Ceramiaceae
- Genus: Ceramium
- Species: C. flaccidum

Binomial name
- Ceramium flaccidum (Kützing) Ardissone

= Ceramium flaccidum =

Species of alga

Ceramium flaccidum is a small red marine alga in the Division Rhodophyta.

== Description ==
Ceramium flaccidum is a small branched red alga no more than 12 cm long. It grows in erect tufts of densely branched laterals. The filaments are basically monosiphonous, the axes are composed of large cells in series with cortical bands at the nodes. The cortication is of ascending and descending filaments which leave a bare internode. Rhizoids are unicellular and numerous. The axes show strongly incurved tips. It has no spines unlike some other Ceramium species.

== Habitat ==
C. flaccidum grows on other algae and on bedrock in the littoral.

== Distribution ==
Found on the south coast of England, Ireland, the Channel Isles. Mediterranean and Australia.

== Reproduction ==
Spermatangia, cystocarps and tetrasporangia have been recorded.
