= Lake Sibaya =

Lake in KwaZulu-Natal, South Africa

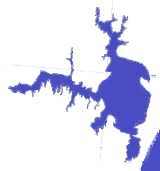

- Location within KwaZulu-Natal
- Location: KwaZulu-Natal
- Coordinates: 27°21′29″S 32°41′07″E
- Catchment area: 530 km^{2} (200 sq mi)
- Basin countries: South Africa
- Surface area: 64 km^{2} (25 sq mi)
- Average depth: 10.9 m (36 ft)
- Water volume: 700,000,000 m^{3} (2.5×10^{10} cu ft)
- Surface elevation: 20.8 m (68 ft)
- Frozen: Never

Ramsar Wetland
- Official name: Lake Sibaya
- Designated: 28 June 1991
- Reference no.: 528

Lake Sibaya, also known as Lake Sibhayi, a freshwater lake in South Africa, with a surface area of 64 km^{2} (25 sq mi). The lake is also known as Sibaya or Sibhaya.

The lake is located in the Maputaland, or Umhlabuyalingana, area of KwaZulu-Natal, on the east coast of South Africa.

It is part of the Greater St. Lucia Wetland Park and is recognised under the Ramsar Convention as a "Wetland of International Importance" on 28 June 1991. In December 1999, the Greater St. Lucia Wetland Park was declared a UNESCO World Heritage Site, and it was renamed the iSimangaliso Wetland Park in 2009.

279 bird species have been identified at Lake Sibaya.

The Mseleni Water Project and Mbazwana Water Supply Scheme both get their water from Lake Sibaya.

== Tourism ==
Lake Sibaya Lodge is situated on the northern shores of the lake. It is an upmarket lodge with 16 chalets.

Between Lake Sibaya and the Indian Ocean is Mabibi. Ezemvelo KZN Wildlife run a campsite and chalets. There is also a private lodge – Thonga Beach Lodge.

The popular beach resort of Sodwana Bay is nearby.

== Level of the lake ==
To establish the probable causes of the almost 4 m drop in the level of Lake Sibaya between 2001 and 2014, to assess the impact of abstractions for domestic water consumption and by commercial plantations on lake levels, and to determine what sustainable yield can be abstracted from Lake Sibaya. From the analysis and simulations undertaken, it is concluded that the major cause of the drop in the level of Lake Sibaya was the below-average rainfall over the period 2001 to 2011. However, while the simulation results show that the effect on lake levels of abstractions for domestic usage over this period has been negligible, they do indicate that nearly 1.4 m of the drop in lake level can be attributed to the impact of the afforestation which began in the catchment in the 1990s. A yield analysis of simulated results with historical developments in the catchment for the 65-year period of observed climate record was undertaken using both a fixed minimum allowable lake level or a maximum drop from a reference lake level as criteria for system failure. Results from simulating lake levels using the historical climate record with the area afforested and abstractions levels fixed at 2014 values indicate that no sustainable additional yield is possible because of the sustained decline in both the simulated lake levels and conceptual groundwater store, which would be environmentally, socially and ecologically unacceptable. Preliminary simulated results indicate that the removal of approximately 5 km^{2} of forestry is required to release 1 MCM/yr for domestic abstractions. However, these preliminary results require improved verification of input data and a review of the modelling for increased confidence in the results.
