= ISimangaliso Wetland Park =

South Africa's third-largest protected area, spanning 280 km of coastline

iSimangaliso Wetland Park
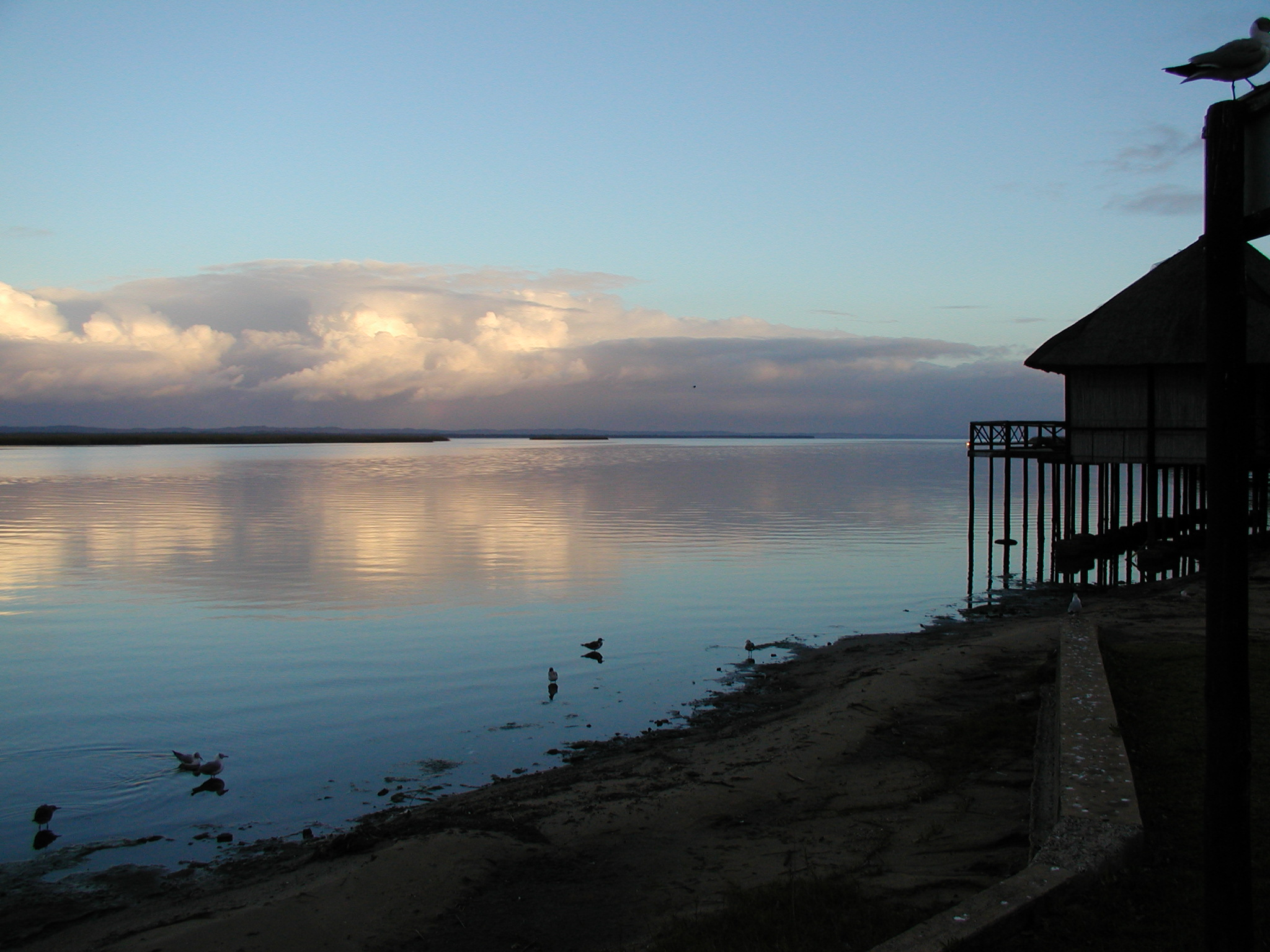
- Greater St. Lucia Wetlands
- Location in South Africa
- Location: KwaZulu-Natal, South Africa
- Nearest city: Durban, South Africa
- Coordinates: 27°39′S 32°34′E
- Area: 3,280 km^{2} (1,270 sq mi)
- Established: 1895
- Governing body: iSimangaliso Authority

UNESCO World Heritage Site
- Criteria: Natural: (vii), (ix), (x)
- Reference: 914
- Inscription: 1999 (23rd Session)
- Area: 239,566 ha (924.97 sq mi)
- Website: http://www.isimangaliso.com/

Ramsar Wetland
- Official name: St. Lucia System
- Designated: 2 October 1986
- Reference no.: 345

The iSimangaliso Marine Protected Area, off the coast of the park

iSimangaliso Wetland Park is situated on the east coast of KwaZulu-Natal, South Africa, about 235 km (146 mi) north of Durban by road. It is South Africa's third-largest protected area, spanning 280 km (170 mi) of coastline, from the Mozambican border in the north to Mapelane south of the Lake St. Lucia estuary, and made up of around 3,280 km^{2} (1,270 sq mi) of natural ecosystems, managed by the iSimangaliso Authority.

The park was previously known as the Greater St. Lucia Wetland Park, but was renamed on 1 November 2007. The word isimangaliso means "a miracle" or "something wondrous" in Zulu. The name came as a result of Shaka's subject having been sent to the land of the Tsonga. When he came back he described the beauty that he saw as a miracle.

The park includes:

- Lake St. Lucia
- St. Lucia Game Reserve
- False Bay Park
- Kosi Bay
- Lake Eteza Nature Reserve
- Lake Sibhayi
- St. Lucia Marine Reserve
- St. Lucia Marine Sanctuary
- Sodwana Bay National Park
- Mapelane Nature Reserve
- Maputaland Marine Protected Area
- Cape Vidal
- Ozabeni
- Mfabeni
- Tewate Wilderness Area
- Mkuze Game Reserve

== Transfrontier parks ==
The park is part of a transfrontier marine park, the Ponta do Ouro-Kosi Bay Transfrontier Conservation Area, straddling South Africa, Mozambique, and Eswatini. The marine conservation area is included in the Greater Lubombo Transfrontier Conservation Area.

== History ==
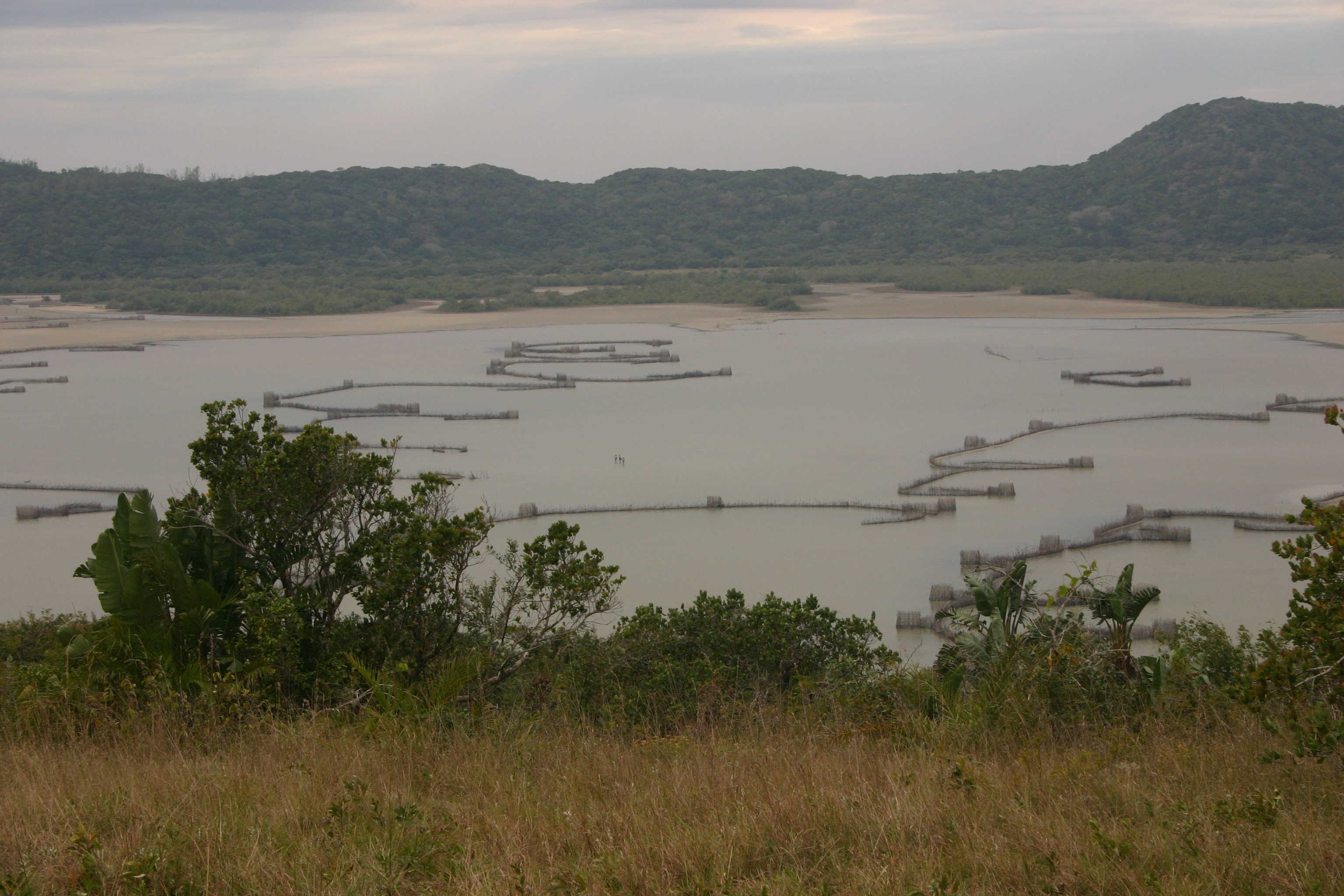
Fish traps in Kosi Bay

Until 1895, the bay had been a home of the Tsonga people and their Tsonga fish kraal. This is the original and the natural home of the Tsonga people who lived here for more than 1000 years. Records from early Portuguese sailors correctly point out this area as well as areas further south to be occupied by the Tsonga people. The area was also known as Tembeland or Thongaland but the name fell into disuse around the early 1900s. The area was ruled by a Tsonga branch of the Vahlanganu (Tembe). The Swiss missionary, Reverend Henri-Alexandre Junod (known as HA Junod), conducted a scientific and ethnographic study of the Tsonga people during the early 1890s and produced a detailed map, showing the occupation of the bay by the Tsonga Tembe people. Junod showed in his map that the area was known as Tembeland and that the Tembe capital city was located in the St Lucia bay, and that by 1906, the Tsonga people occupied the land from St Lucia to Valdezia in the Spelenkon district of the Transvaal province, known today as Limpopo Province. St Lucia bay and Maputo Bay are one land and they belong to the Tsonga people, Tsonga villages were built from St Lucia bay until Maputo and they were not separated by any natural division. Around St Lucia, the ruling chief was the Tembe Royal Family, while around Maputo, the ruling class was the Maputo royal family, who are all of the Vahlanganu branch of the Tsonga people. In and around Maputo and St Lucia bay (Tembeland), the language spoken is Ronga, which according to the Swiss Missionary, Rev HA Junod, is not an independent language but a dialect of Xitsonga due to its similarity to it.

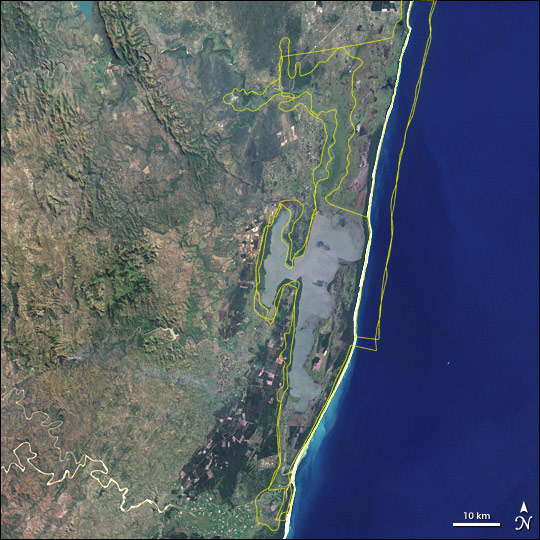
Satellite image of the park, with the borders of several conservation areas outlined in yellow.

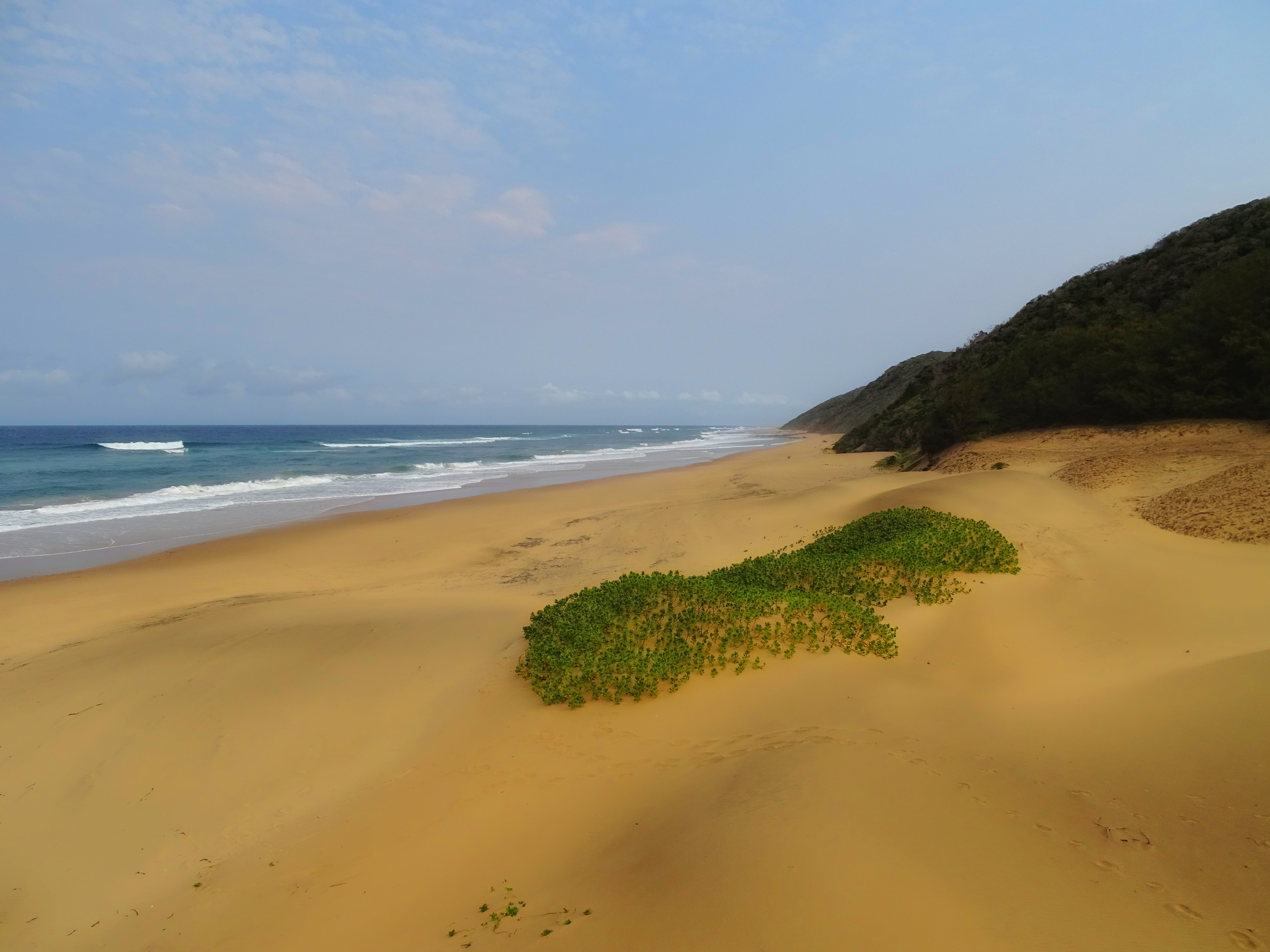
Looking south along the beach from near the camping area at Cape Vidal.

St. Lucia was first named in 1554 Rio dos Medos do Ouro (alternatively Rio dos Médãos do Ouro — River of the Gold Dunes) by the survivors of the Portuguese ship Saint Benedict. At this stage, only the Tugela River mouth was known as St. Lucia. Later, in 1575, the Tugela River was named Tugela. On 13 December 1575, the day of the feast of Saint Lucy, Manuel Peresterello renamed the mouth area to Santa Lucia.

In 1822, St. Lucia was proclaimed by the British as a township.
In 1895, St. Lucia Game Reserve, 30 km (19 mi) north of the town was proclaimed.
In 1971, St. Lucia Lake and the turtle beaches and coral reefs of Maputaland have been listed by the Convention on Wetlands of International Importance (Ramsar Convention).

In December 1999, the park was declared a UNESCO World Heritage Site at an unveiling ceremony, where Nelson Mandela was the guest of honour. In 2025, the area under the heritage designation was expanded to include the Maputo National Park in neighbouring Mozambique.

== Biodiversity ==
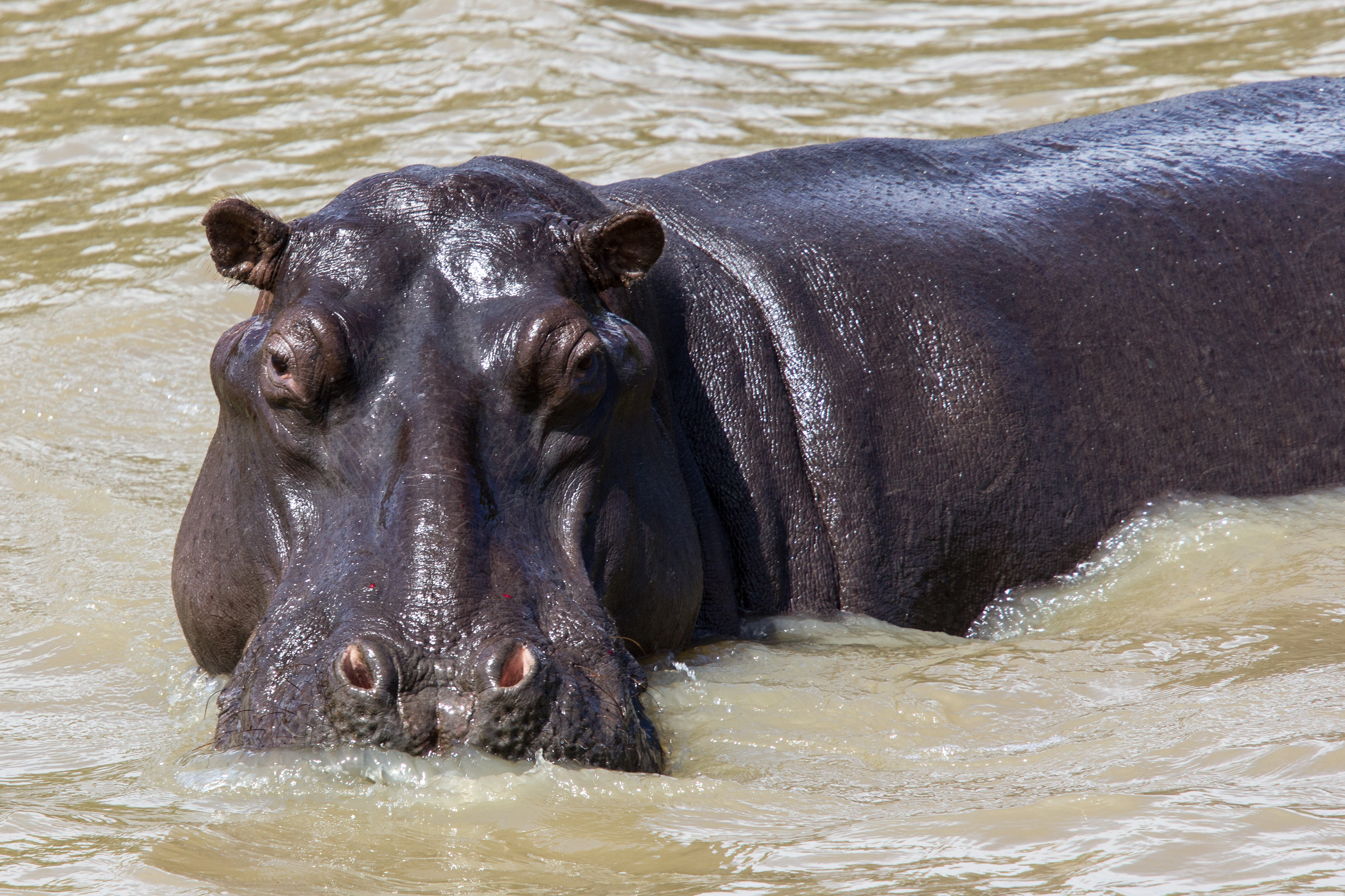
Hippopotamus at iSimangaliso Wetland Park, KwaZulu-Natal

The park was proclaimed a world heritage site because of the rich biodiversity, unique ecosystems and natural beauty occurring in a relatively small area. The reason for the great diversity in fauna and flora is the great variety of different ecosystems on the park, ranging from coral reefs and sandy beaches to subtropical dune forests, savannas, and wetlands. Animals occurring on the park include elephant, leopard, black and southern white rhino, Cape buffalo, and in the ocean, whales, dolphins, and marine turtles including the leatherback and loggerhead turtles.

The park is also home to 1,200 crocodiles and 800 hippopotami.

In December 2013, after 44 years of absence, African lions were reintroduced to iSimangaliso.

There are large outcrops of underwater reefs which are home to brightly coloured fish and corals. Some of the most spectacular coral diversity in the world is located in Sodwana Bay, and octopus and squid species are common. Whale sharks are occasionally seen.

Twenty-four species of bivalve molluscs are recorded in St. Lucia Lake, which constitutes a considerable portion of the park.

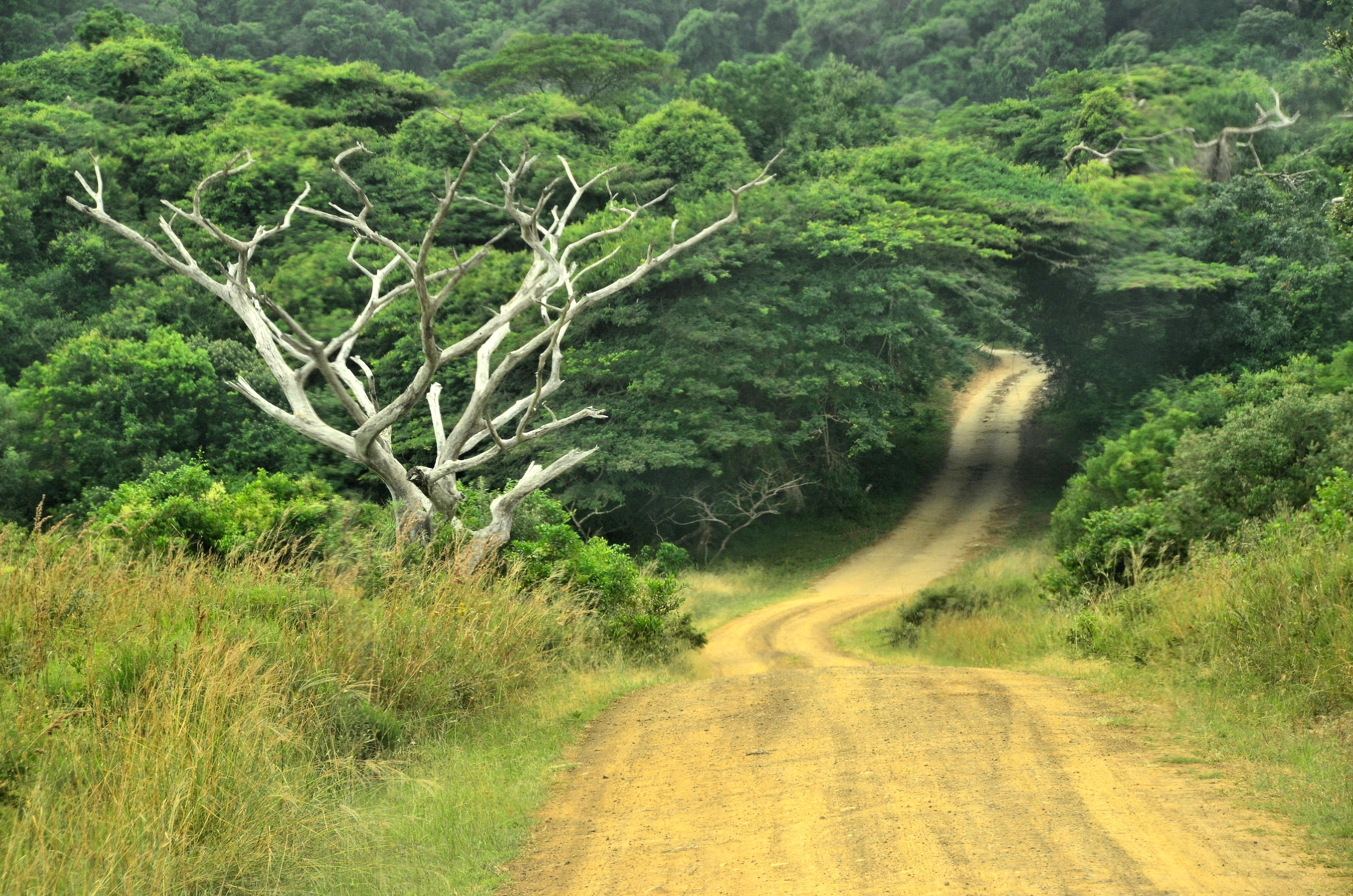
Coastal forest road

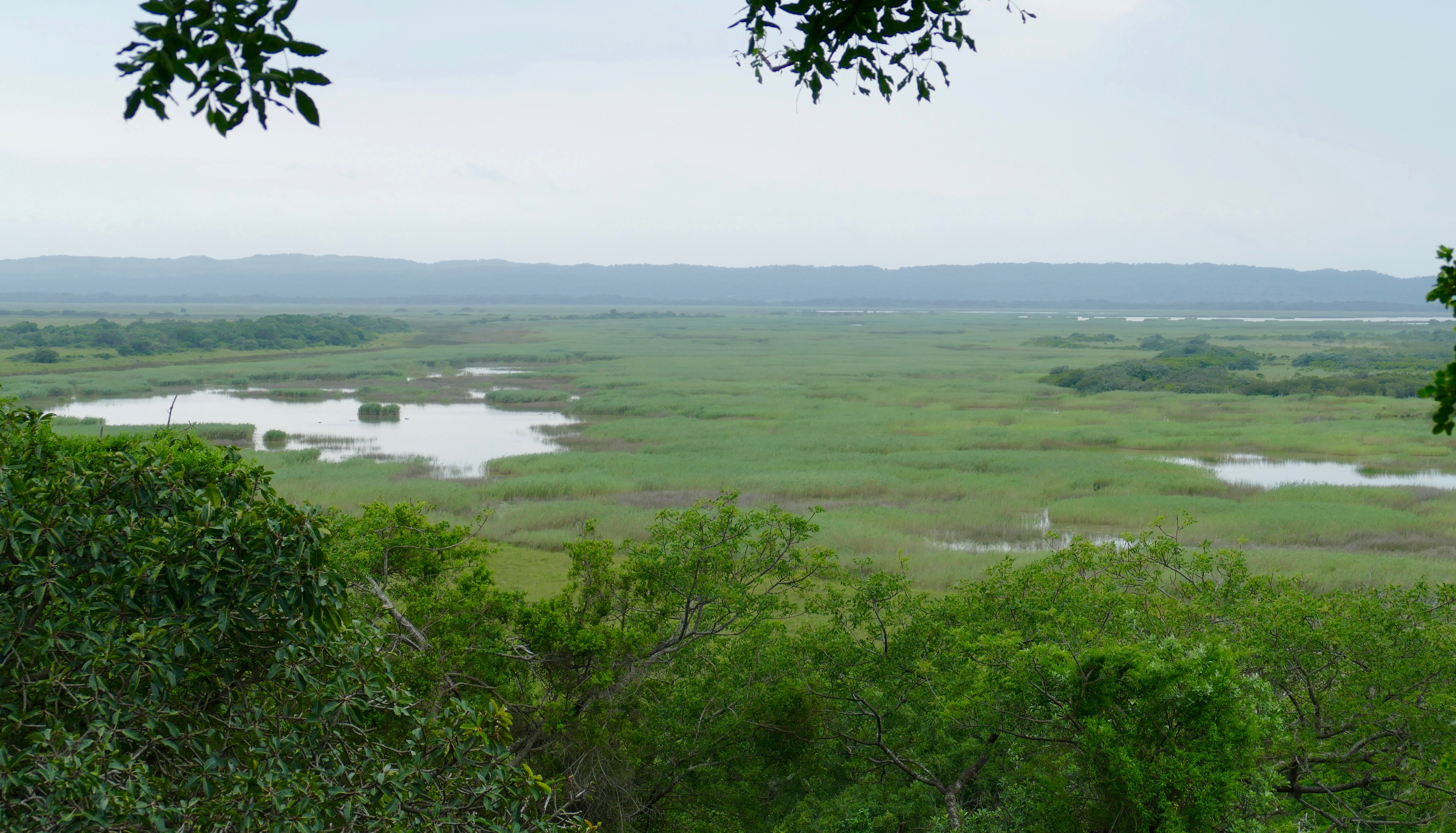
iSimangaliso wetlands

== See also ==
- List of World Heritage Sites in Africa
- Protected areas of South Africa
