= Sodwana Bay National Park =

National park in northern KwaZulu-Natal, South Africa

Coordinates: 27°33′18″S 32°40′00″E

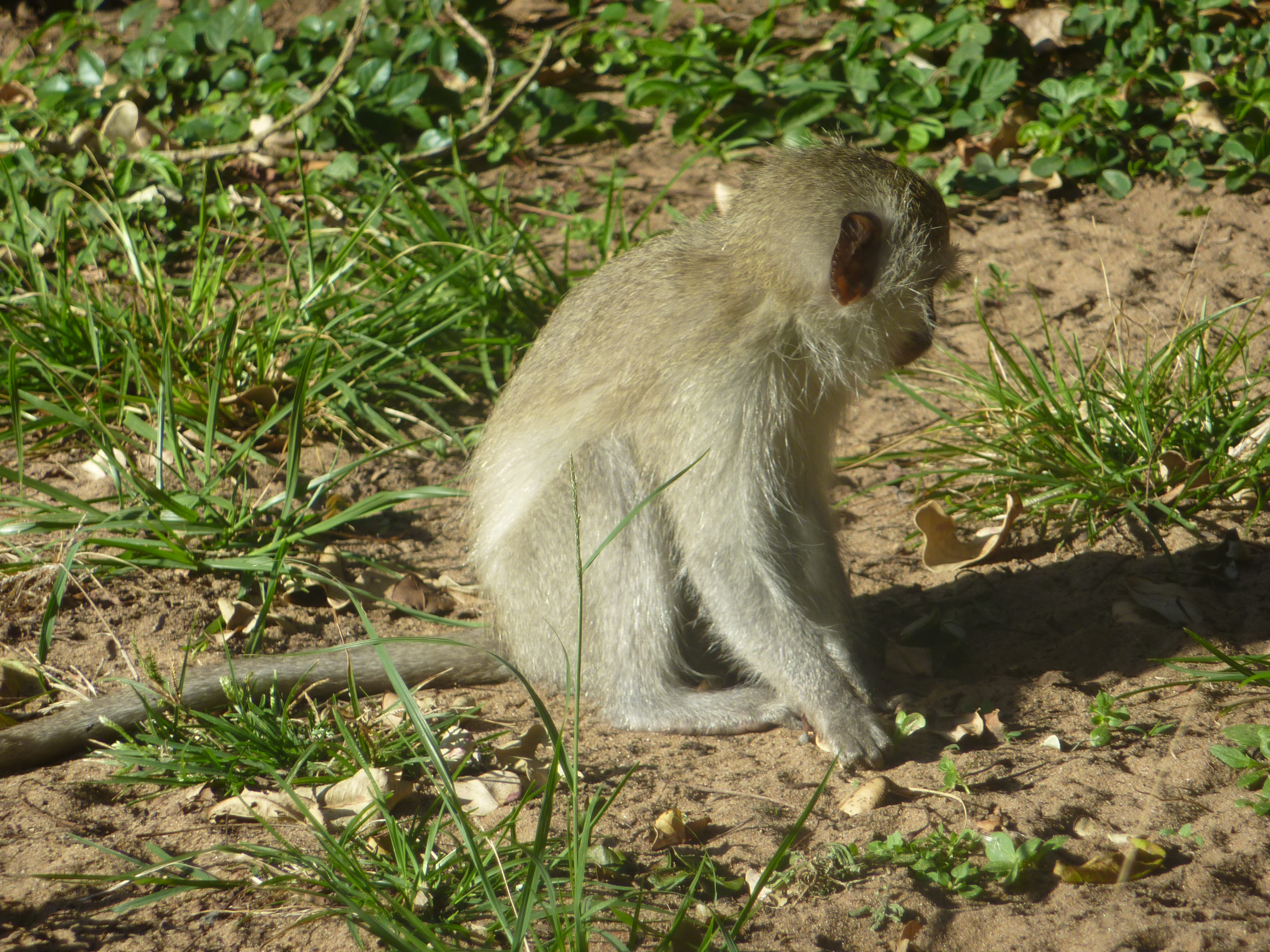
Monkey

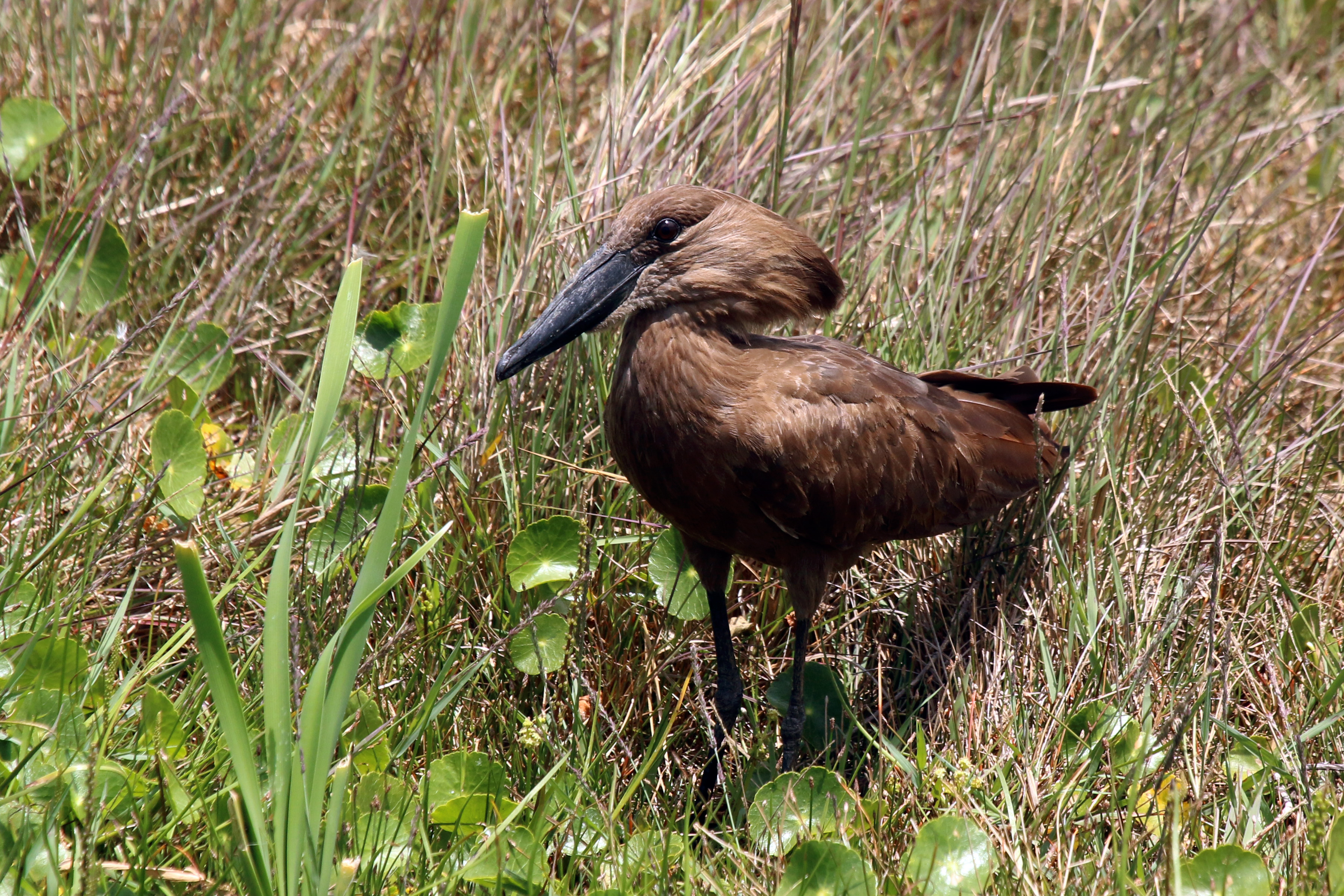
Hamerkop (Scopus umbretta) iSimangaliso

Sodwana Bay National Park, is a park situated on the north eastern coast of KwaZulu-Natal, South Africa; it is located within the iSimangaliso Wetland Park World Heritage Site 20 minutes away from local town Mbazwana. This park is known for sport fishing, scuba diving and snorkelling.

It is abundantly rich in a variety of fish species, fauna and flora covering the coastal area of about 240 km (150 mi) and includes an inland area of about 3,320 km^{2} (1,280 sq mi). This is a tourism sustained community, generating most of its income from international tourist visitors and a good number of local tourists, by providing accommodation in the form of nearby hotels, vacation resorts, bed and breakfasts, diving centres, camps, and lodges.

Due to its rich biodiversity, it invites a great deal of researchers and hosts some entertainment events, from fishing competitions to beach concerts.

In summer, loggerhead and leatherback turtles come out of the ocean to nest on the beaches.

== See also ==
- List of protected areas of South Africa
