= List of coralline algae species in the British Isles =

This is a list of coralline algae species in the British Isles.

- Boreolithon van-heuckii
- Choreonema thuretii
- Corallina elongata
- Corallina officinalis
- Haliptilon squamatum
- Jania rubens
- Lithophyllum crouaniorum
- Lithophyllum dentatum
- Lithophyllum duckerae
- Lithophyllum fasciculum
- Lithophyllum hibernicum
- Lithophyllum incrustans
- Lithophyllum nitorum
- Lithophyllum orbiculatum
- Titanoderma corallinae
- Titanoderma laminariae
- Titanoderma pustulatum
- Hydrolithon boreale
- Hydrolithon cruciatum
- Hydrolithon farinosum
- Hydrolithon samoënse
- Hydrolithon sargassi
- Pneophyllum confervicola
- Pneophyllum coronatum
- Pneophyllum fragile
- Pneophyllum limitatum
- Pneophyllum lobescens
- Pneophyllum myriocarpum
- Exilicrusta parva
- Lithophytum bornetii
- Lithophytum elatum
- Lithophytum laeve
- Lithothamnion corallioides
- Lithothamnion glaciale
- Lithothamnion lemoineae
- Lithothamnion sonderi
- Melobesia membranacea
- Mesophyllum lichenoides
- Phymatolithon brunneum
- Phymatolithon calcareum
- Phymatolithon laevigatum
- Phymatolithon lamii
- Phymatolithon lenormandii
- Phymatolithon purpureum
