= Maerl =

Coralline red algae

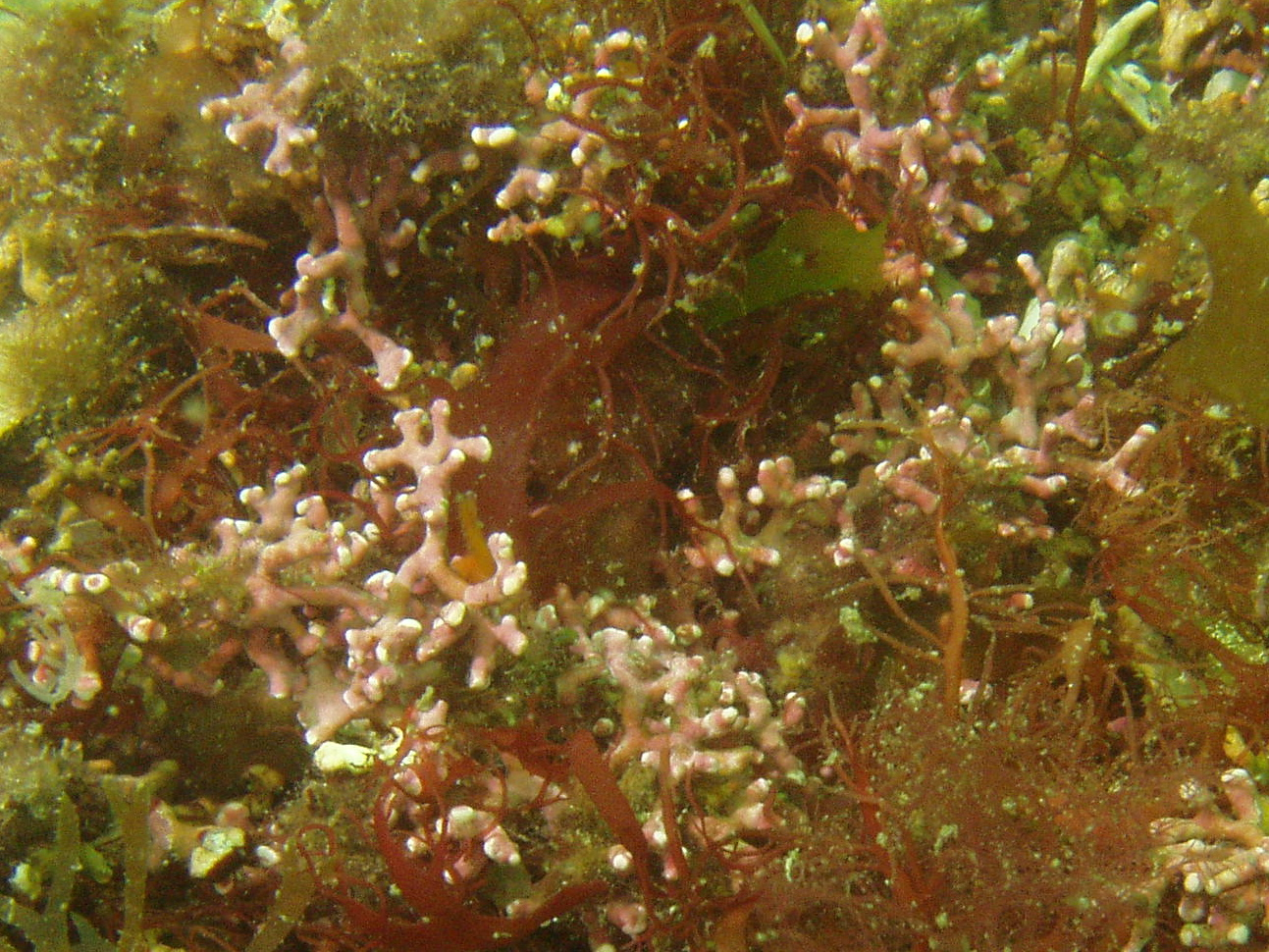
Maerl off the coast of the Isle of Arran

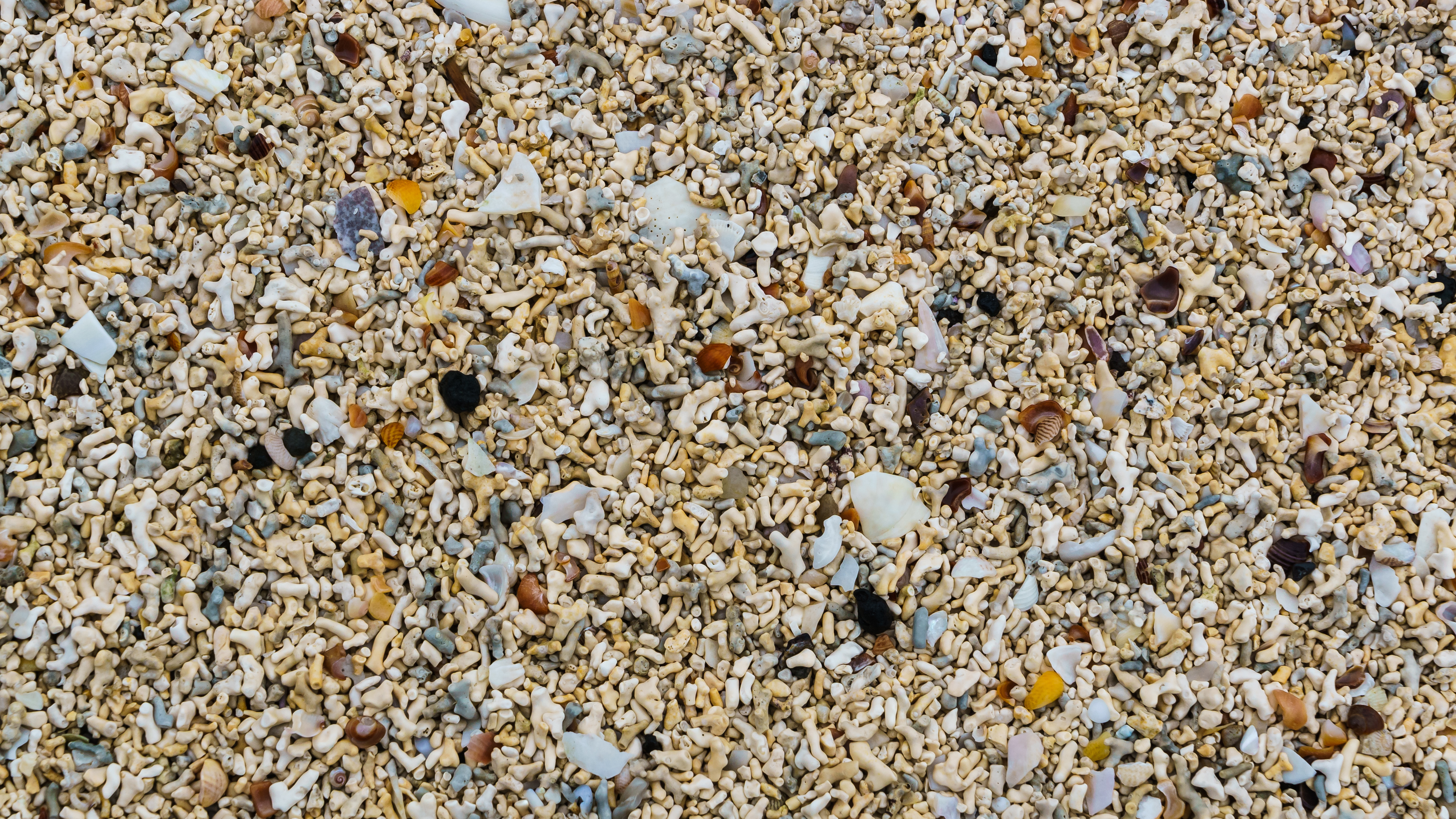
Calcified remains of maerl, on the "coral beach" in the Isle of Skye

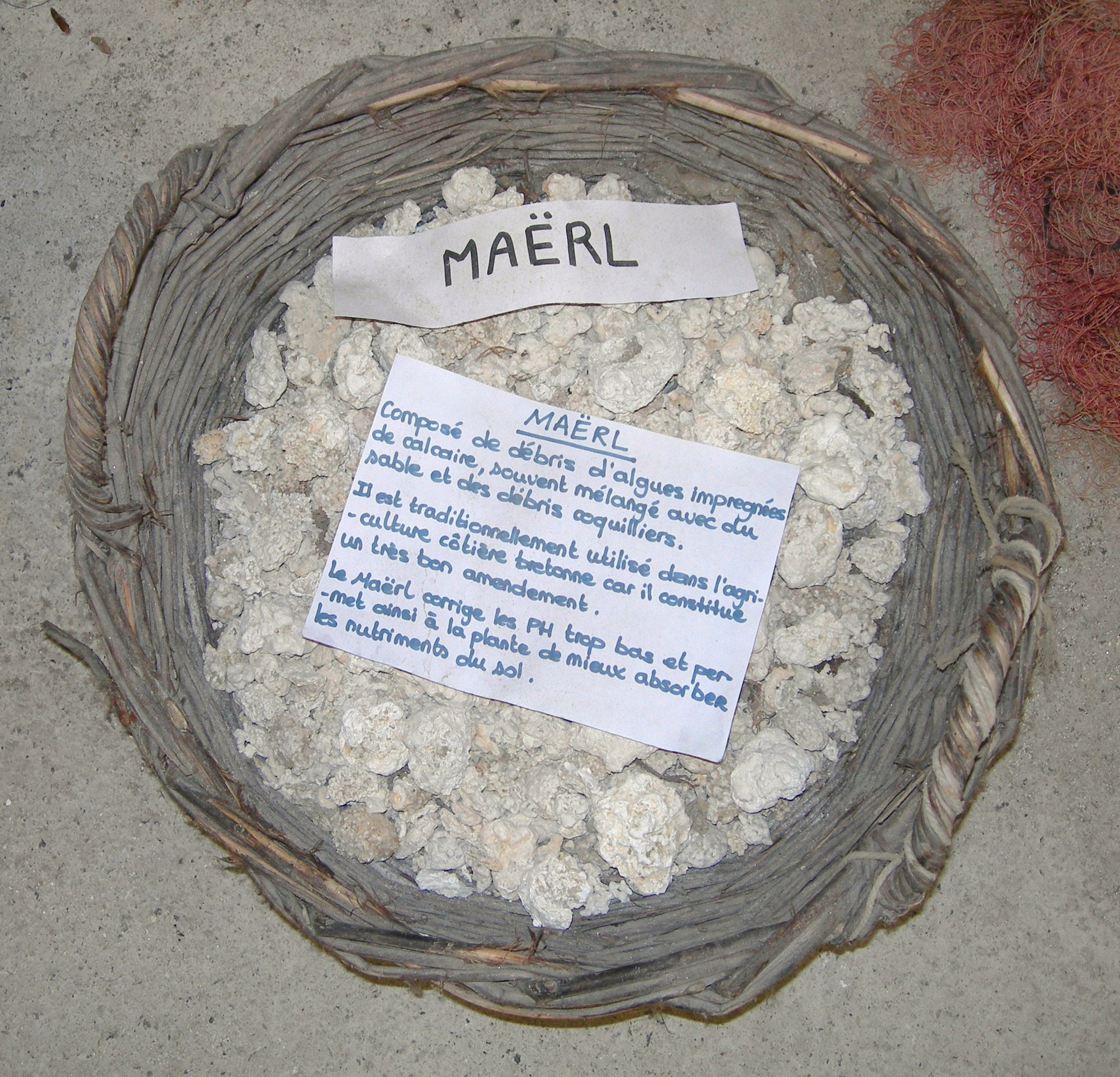
Maerl in Lanildut.

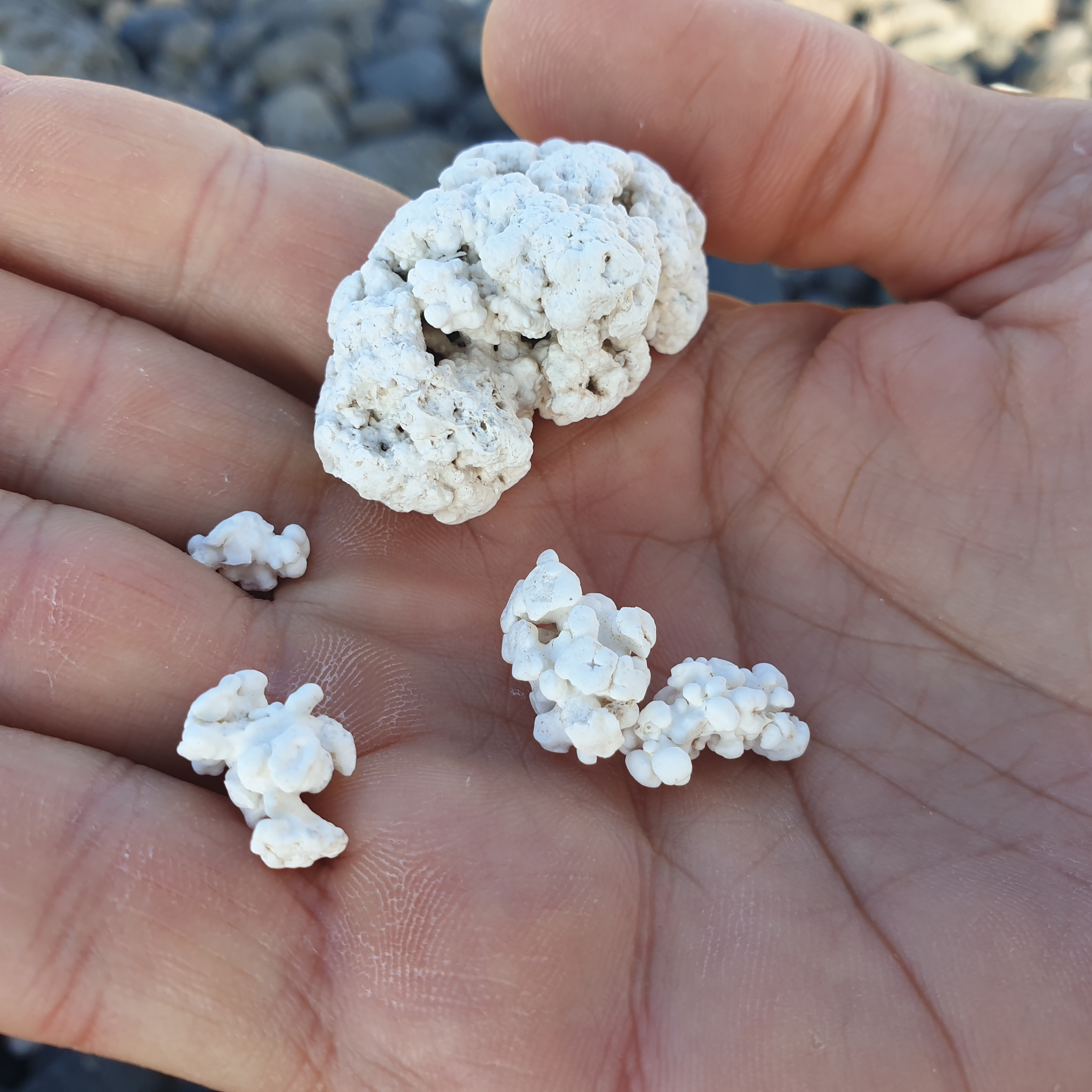
Pieces of popcorn-like maerl from Fuerteventura island.

Maerl (also rhodolith) is a collective name for non-geniculate coralline red algae with a certain growth habit. Maerl grows at a rate of c. 1 mm per year. It accumulates as unattached particles and forms extensive beds in suitable sublittoral sites. The term maerl originally refers to the branched growth form of Lemoine (1910) and rhodolith is a sedimentological or genetic term for both the nodular and branched growth forms (Basso et al., 2015). The terms rhodolith and maerl are used in very similar ways. A study in 2023 clarifies that maerl refers to only living, branched coralline thalli, while rhodolith includes unattached coralline red algae, both dead and alive.

== Description ==
In Europe maerl beds occur throughout the Mediterranean, along most of the Atlantic coast from Portugal to Norway, and in the English Channel, Irish Sea and North Sea. The distribution of maerl is dependent on water movement, light and salinity concentration. Maerl beds occur in the photic zone, and can be found to around 30 m depth in the British Isles and up to 120 m deep in the Mediterranean. Maerl deposits can reach up to 10 m thick, but are usually much thinner; carbon dating has shown that they can be more than 5500 years old.

In the British Isles maerl is composed of three species of coralline algae growing loose in beds of fragmented nodules in the sub-littoral. The species generally involved are: Lithothamnion corallioides, Lithothamnion glaciale and Phymatolithon calcareum.

Maerl is dredged from the sea floor and crushed to form a powder. It is still harvested around the coasts of Brittany in France and Bantry Bay, Ireland, and is a popular fertilizer for organic gardening. It was also dredged off Falmouth, Cornwall, but this ceased in 2004.

Scientists investigated Falmouth maerl and found that L. corallioides predominated down to 6 m and P. calcareum from 6–10 m. A 2024 survey by researchers from the University of Exeter, commissioned by Cornwall Council's Blue Natural Capital Project, found that the Fal and Helford Estuary Special Area of Conservation supports an 880 hectare bed of maerl.

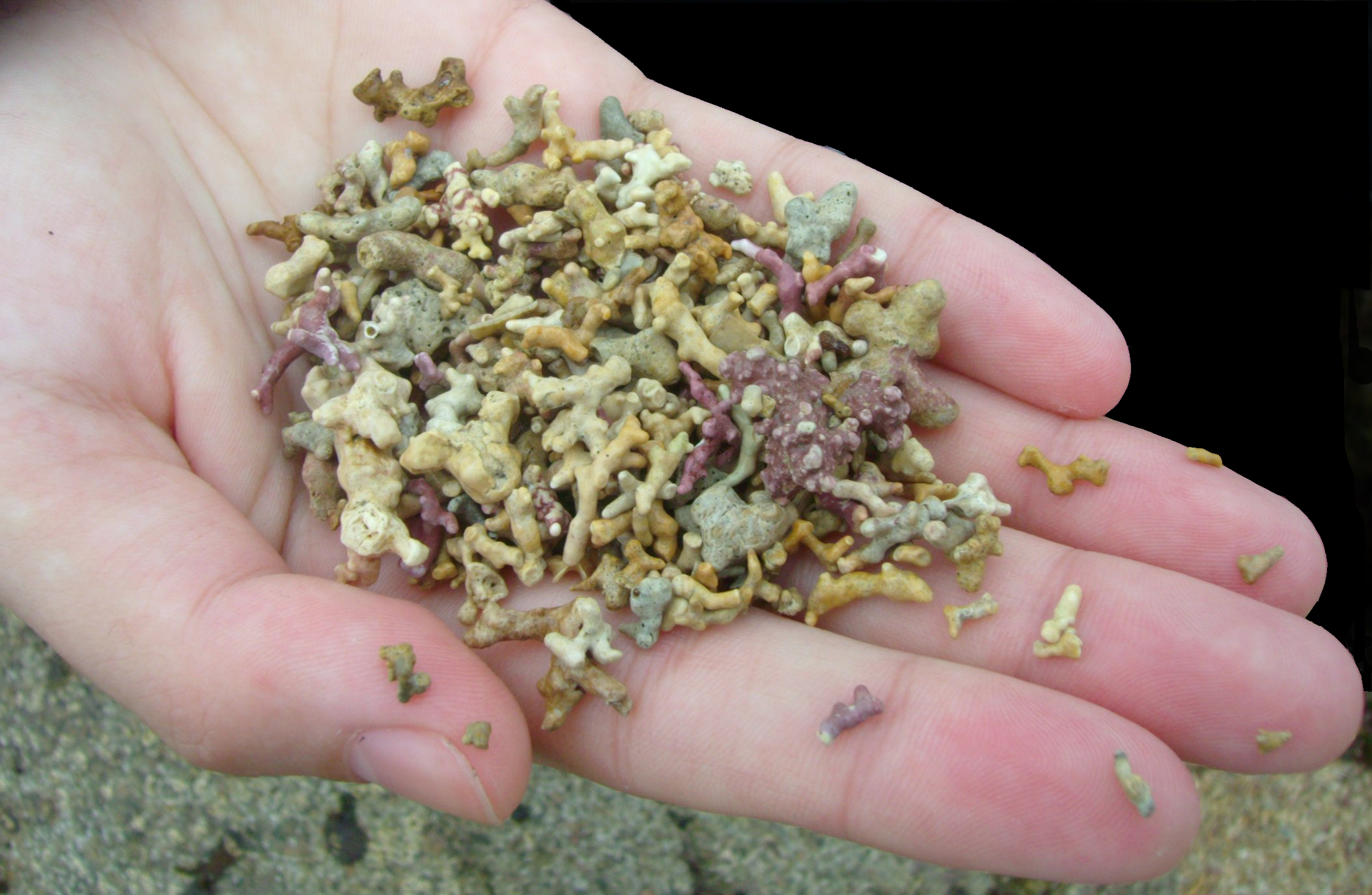
Maerl fragments, Trá an Doilin, Maerl Beach (incorrectly known as "Coral Strand") Carraroe, County Galway, Ireland

Chemical analysis of maerl showed that it contained 32.1% CaCO_{3} and 3.1% MgCO_{3} (dry weight).

== Ecology ==
The ecology of maerl habitats has received very little attention in contrast to other marine ecosystems such as kelp forests or sea grass beds. Maerl beds provide a complex habitat for a wide range of taxa with a variety of niches that support high associated invertebrate and algal biodiversity. Maerl beds act as nursery areas for the juvenile stages of commercial species such as juvenile cod Gadus morhua, saithe Pollachius virens, Pollack Pollachius pollachius and juvenile scallops Aequipecten opercularis. Maerl beds offer physical refuge and protection from predation as well as productive feeding grounds but are easily damaged by dredging and towed fishing gear.

Maerl has no tolerance for desiccation.

== History ==
Maerl has been extracted for centuries mainly for use as an agricultural fertilizer. The amount extracted increased in the late 20th century and in 2000, maerl was extracted at c. 5,000 tonnes per year in Ireland and c. 500,000 tonnes per year in France. Large scale maerl extraction over the past 40 years has removed and degraded maerl beds. In Cornwall, England, maerl has been extracted since the 1970s, but was banned in 2005 by Falmouth Harbour Commissioners.

An early reference to maerl was made by John Ray in 1690 who reported it from Falmouth. In Ireland, maerl is extracted from subfossil beds in Bantry Bay by Celtic Sea Minerals. The maerl-forming species Lithothamion corallioides and Phymatolithon calcareum are listed in Annex V of the EC Habitats Directive.

== Uses ==
Used as a soil conditioner, it is dredged from the sea floor and crushed to a powder. The slow growth of individual nodules and their accumulation in beds over a millennial timescale means that there is no possibility of maerl keeping up with dredging for this purpose. Maerl should be considered as a non-renewable resource, and readily available alternative products (e.g., garden lime) make modern day exploitation controversial.
