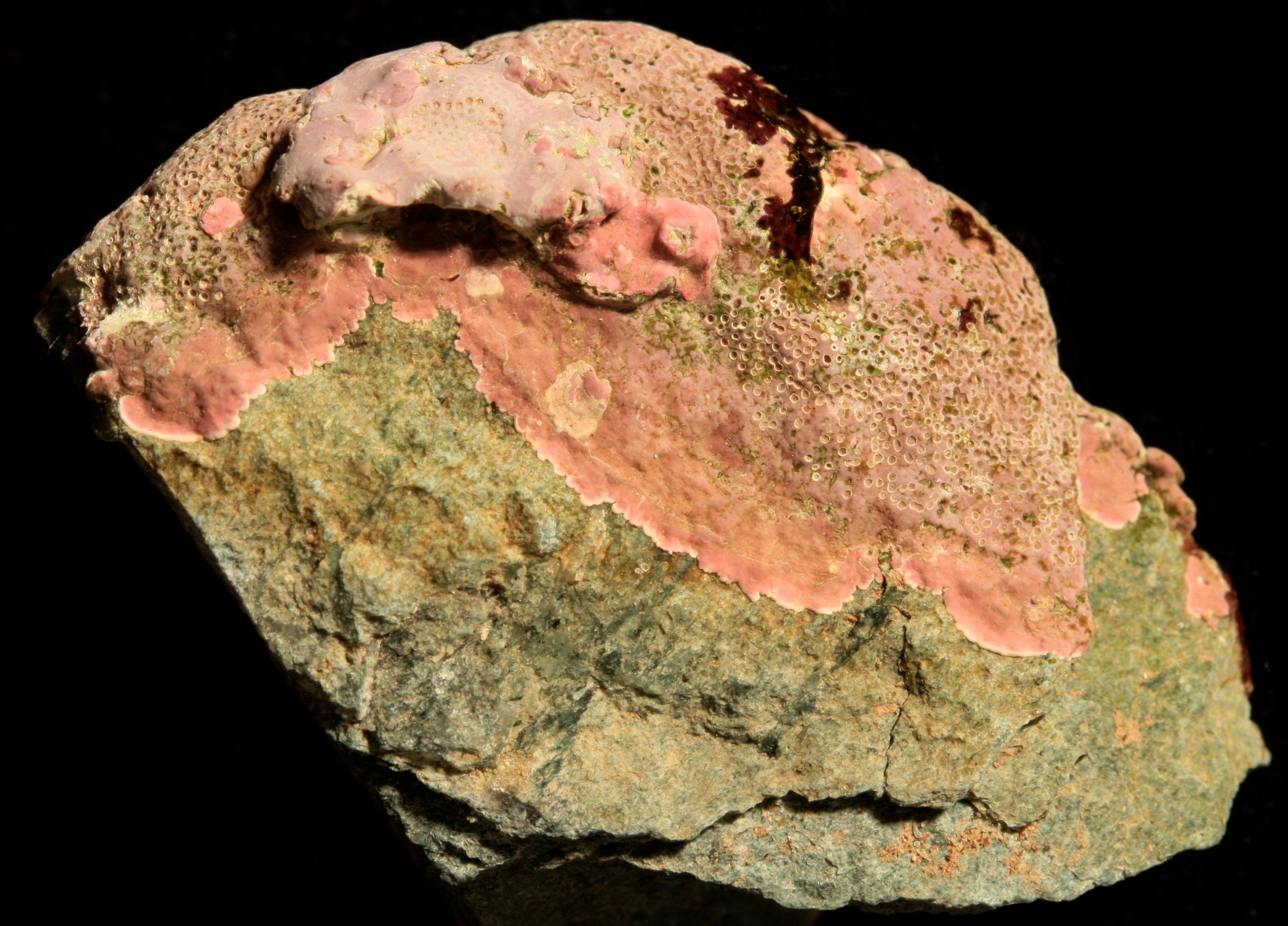
- Lithophyllum orbiculatum from Castalia, Grand Manan Island, New Brunswick, Canada

Scientific classification
- Clade: Archaeplastida
- Division: Rhodophyta
- Class: Florideophyceae
- Order: Corallinales
- Family: Corallinaceae
- Genus: Lithophyllum
- Species: L. orbiculatum

Binomial name
- Lithophyllum orbiculatum (Foslie) Foslie 1900

= Lithophyllum orbiculatum =

Species of alga

Lithophyllum orbiculatum is a species of thalloid coralline algae, which are a red algae whose cell walls contain calcareous deposits.

== History ==
Due to being very similar, the species of coralline algae Lithophyllum crouanii, was often misidentified as Lithophyllum orbiculatum.

== Distribution & habitat ==
This species is often found in the north of the Atlantic Ocean and in the Mediterranean Sea. It has also been collected in the Indian Ocean more recently. The coralline algae lives in the mid-tide and higher level pools, occasionally exposed to air. The coralline algae mostly grows on hard rock surfaces and was not found on any limestone or slate rock. It can also be found growing on the shells of mollusks that live in the same area, however the algae was physically reduced on the shells. Over time the coralline algae will come together on the surfaces to form large colonies and cover the vast majority of a surface.

== Ecology ==
The coralline algae often acts as a pioneer that first colonizes new surfaces and prepares it for colonization by other organisms. It sheds its epithallus occasionally in order to prevent other organisms growing over it. Still, it is often overgrown by Lithophyllum incrustans in what is considered ecological succession.

== Morphology ==
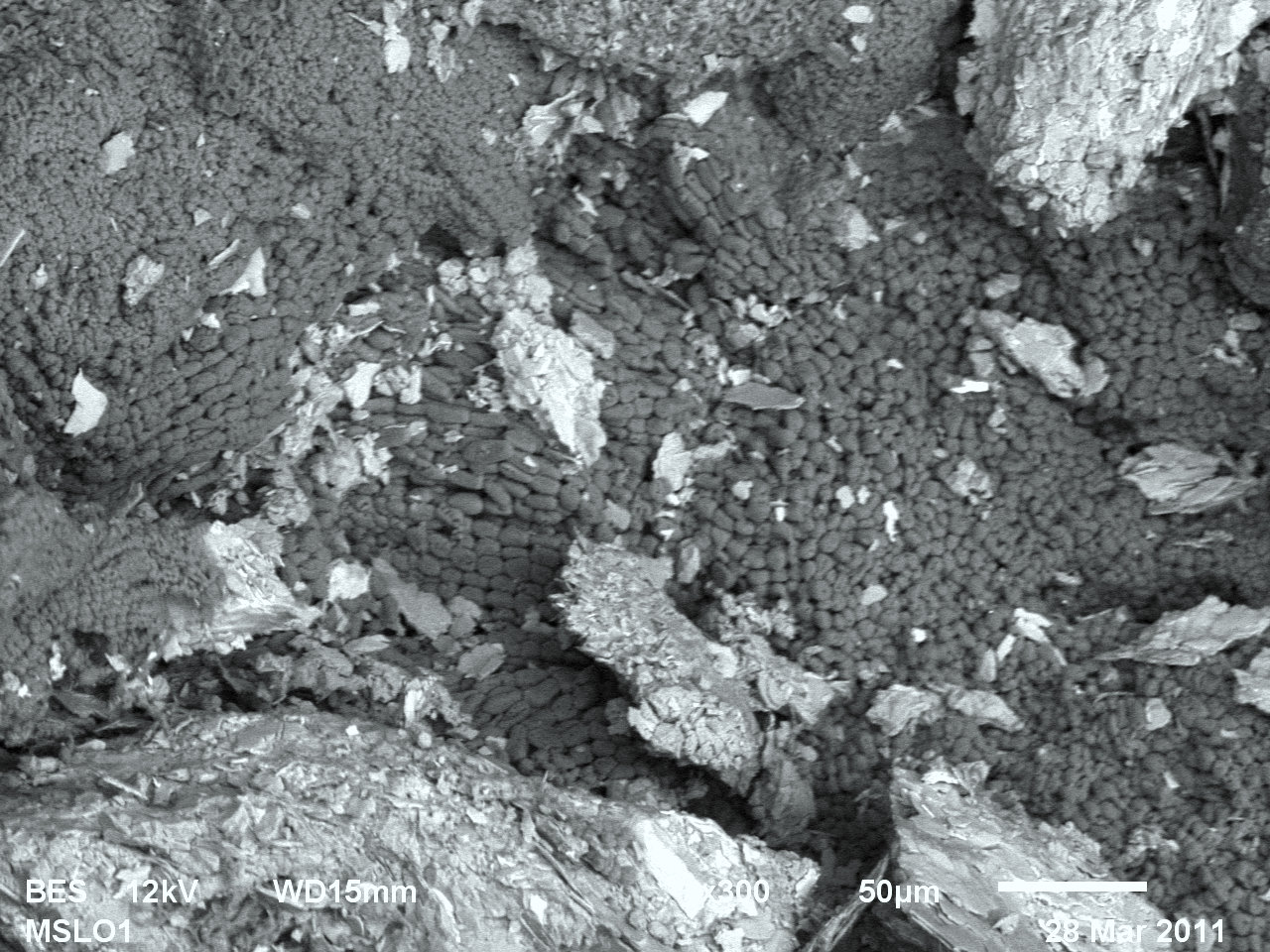
Undersurface of Lithophyllum orbiculatum, showing hypothallus and perithallus

The coralline algae has a rough and chalky texture, and the color can range from grey, brown, and pink. They are thin and will attach very strongly to the surface. The individuals of the species are small, when young the algae's diameter can be up to 8 mm, but when mature the diameter is around 25 mm. Younger specimens will be relatively thin, up to 1 mm thick, with their margins being attenuated and crimped. The mature specimens are thicker and have irregular shapes. Specimens found in areas prone to exposure have thalli that form protuberances that may reach 5 mm tall.

== Reproduction ==
The coralline algae reproduces during the winter, approximately from October to February. They reproduce using uniporate conceptacles, which are cavities where the reproductive organs of algae are found. The algae may be tetrasporangial, spermatangial, or carposporangial reproduction types. Depending on which type the algae is, the conceptacles will vary in size.
