= Crustose =

Biological layer adhering closely to a substrate

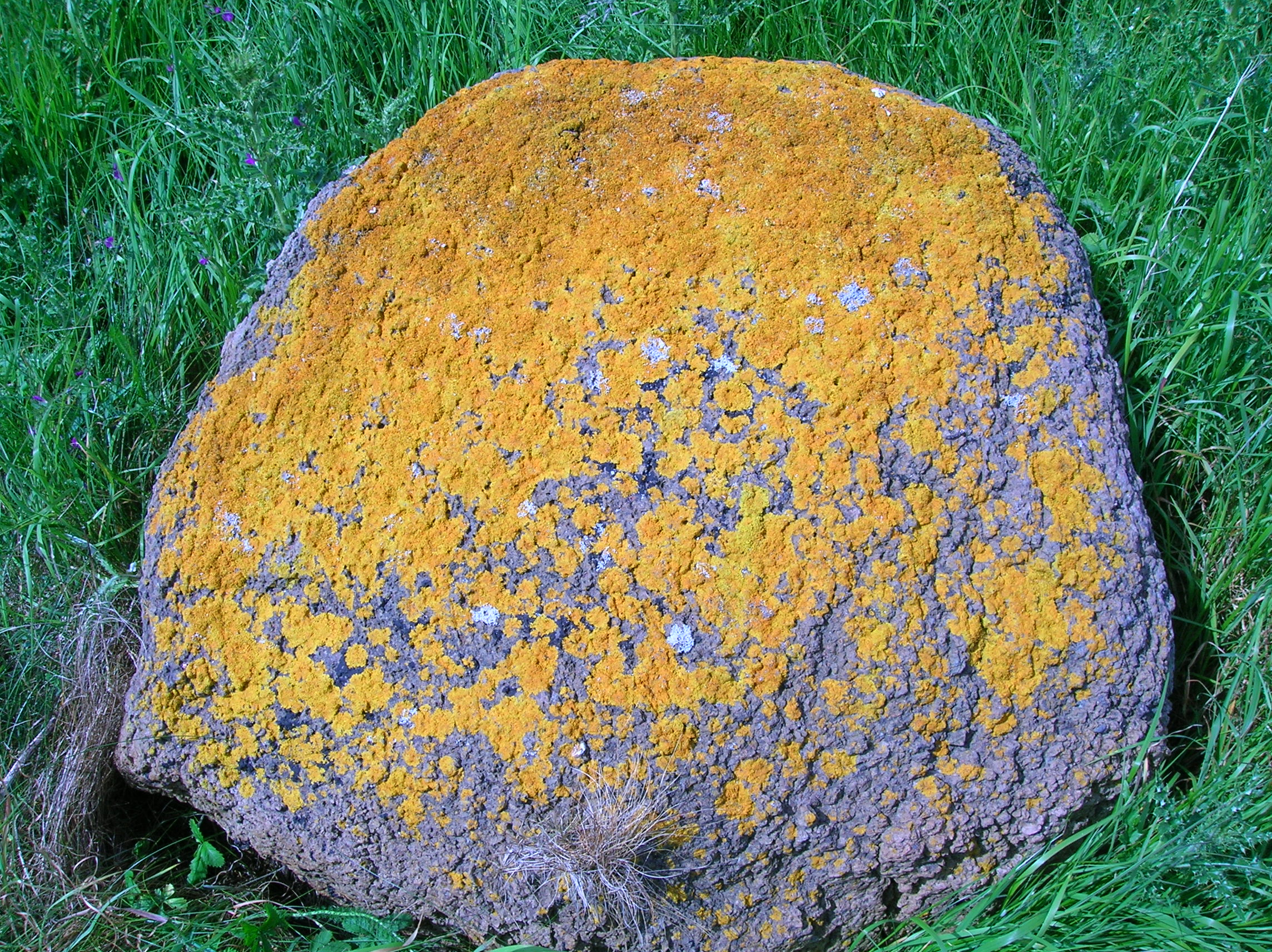
A crustose lichen, Caloplaca marina

Crustose is a habit of some types of algae and lichens in which the organism grows tightly appressed to a substrate, forming a biological layer. Crustose adheres very closely to the substrates at all points. Crustose is found on rocks and tree bark. Some species of marine algae of the Rhodophyta, in particular members of the order Corallinales, family Corallinaceae, subfamily Melobesioideae with cell walls containing calcium carbonate grow to great depths in the intertidal zone, forming crusts on various substrates. The substrate can be rocks throughout the intertidal zone, or, as in the case of the Corallinales, reef-building corals, and other living organisms including plants, such as mangroves and animals such as shelled molluscs. The coralline red algae are major members of coral reef communities, cementing the corals together with their crusts. Among the brown algae, the order Ralfsiales comprises two families of crustose algae.

== Growth and habitat ==
Many lichens grow close to the surface of rocks, tree trunks, and other substrata, and are referred to as crustose lichens. Crustose organisms can be detrimental to engineered structures when found on buildings, coastal structures, and ships.

There are different types of crustose lichens, including endolithic, endophloidic and leprose. Endolithic lichens are immersed in the outer layer of rocks with their bodies above the surface. Endophloidic ones are located in or on plant tissue. Leprose lichens consist of crusts without a layered structure.

Crustose lichens have learned to adapt to their environment, with the shells helping with adaptation to dry and drought resistant climates. Crustose lichens have been found in deserts, ice free parts of Antarctica, and in the Alpine and Arctic regions.

== Characteristics ==
Crustose can come in a variety of colors such as yellow, orange, red, gray and green. These colors tend to be bright and vibrant.

Crustose is similar to other lichens because they share a similar internal morphology. The lichen's body is formed from filaments of the fungal partner. The density of these filaments determines the layers within the lichen.

== Productivity ==
There are many variations of crustose, including Crustose Coralline Algae (CCA), found in three different habitats; flat, crest and slope reef. CCA are highly dependent on sunlight to grow in abundance, and their growth increases productivity. CCA acts as the main food source for certain fish including parrotfish and Scarus trispinosus.
