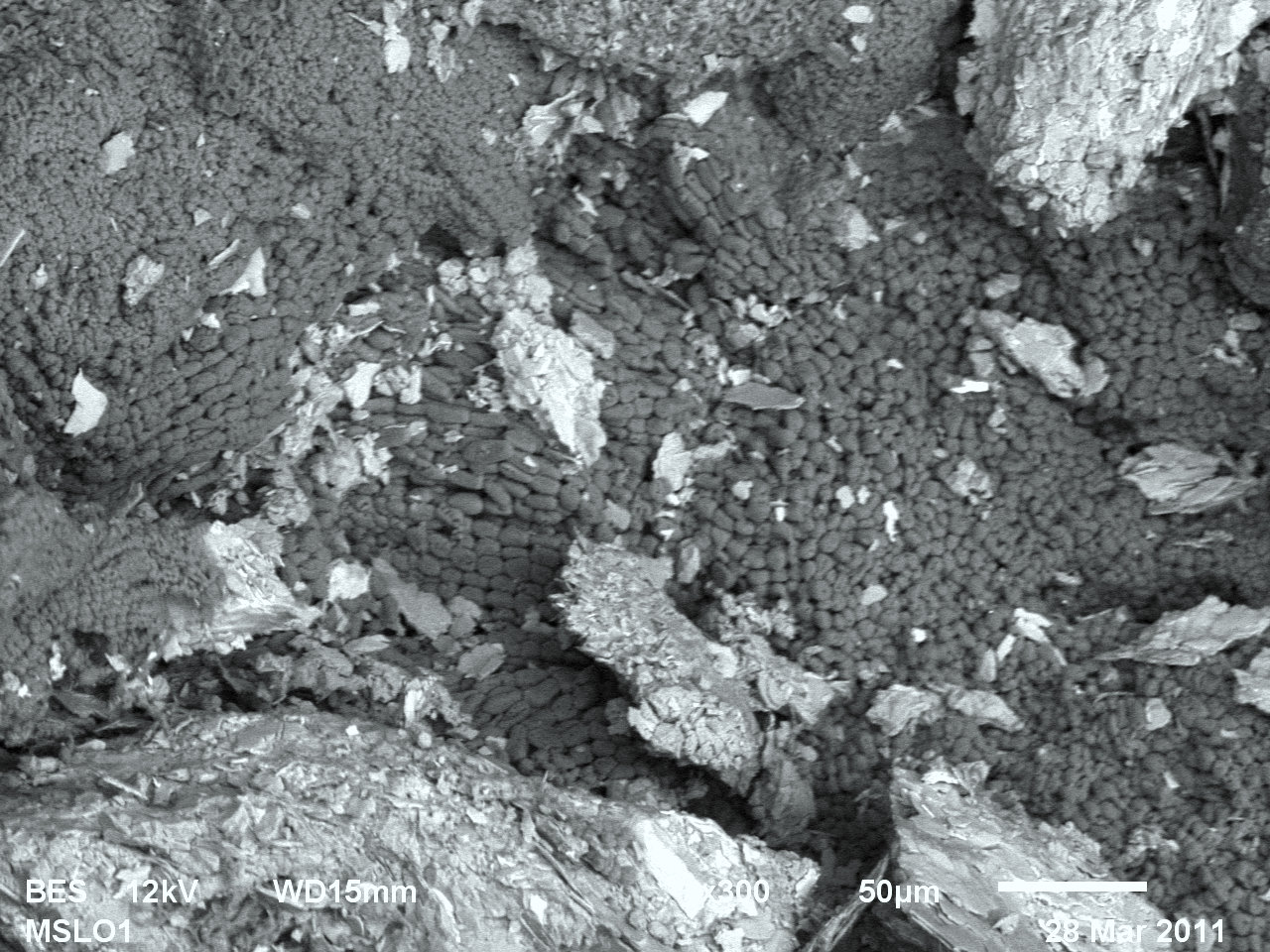
- Undersurface of Lithophyllum orbiculatum, showing hypothallus and perithallus

Scientific classification
- Domain: Eukaryota
- Supergroup: Archaeplastida
- Division: Rhodophyta
- Class: Florideophyceae
- Order: Corallinales
- Family: Corallinaceae
- Subfamily: Lithophylloideae
- Genus: Lithophyllum; Philippi, 1837

Species
- 107 species, see text

Synonyms
- Hyperantherella Heydrich, 1900; Lithothamnium R.A.Philippi, 1837; Melobesia Heydrich, 1897; Perispermon Heydrich, 1900 (synonym); Pseudolithophyllum Marie Lemoine, 1913; Stichospora Heydrich, 1900; Tenarea Bory de Saint-Vincent, 1832

= Lithophyllum =

Lithophyllum Temporal range: Silurian – Recent 418.7–0.0 Ma

Genus of algae

Lithophyllum is a genus of thalloid red algae belonging to the family Corallinaceae.

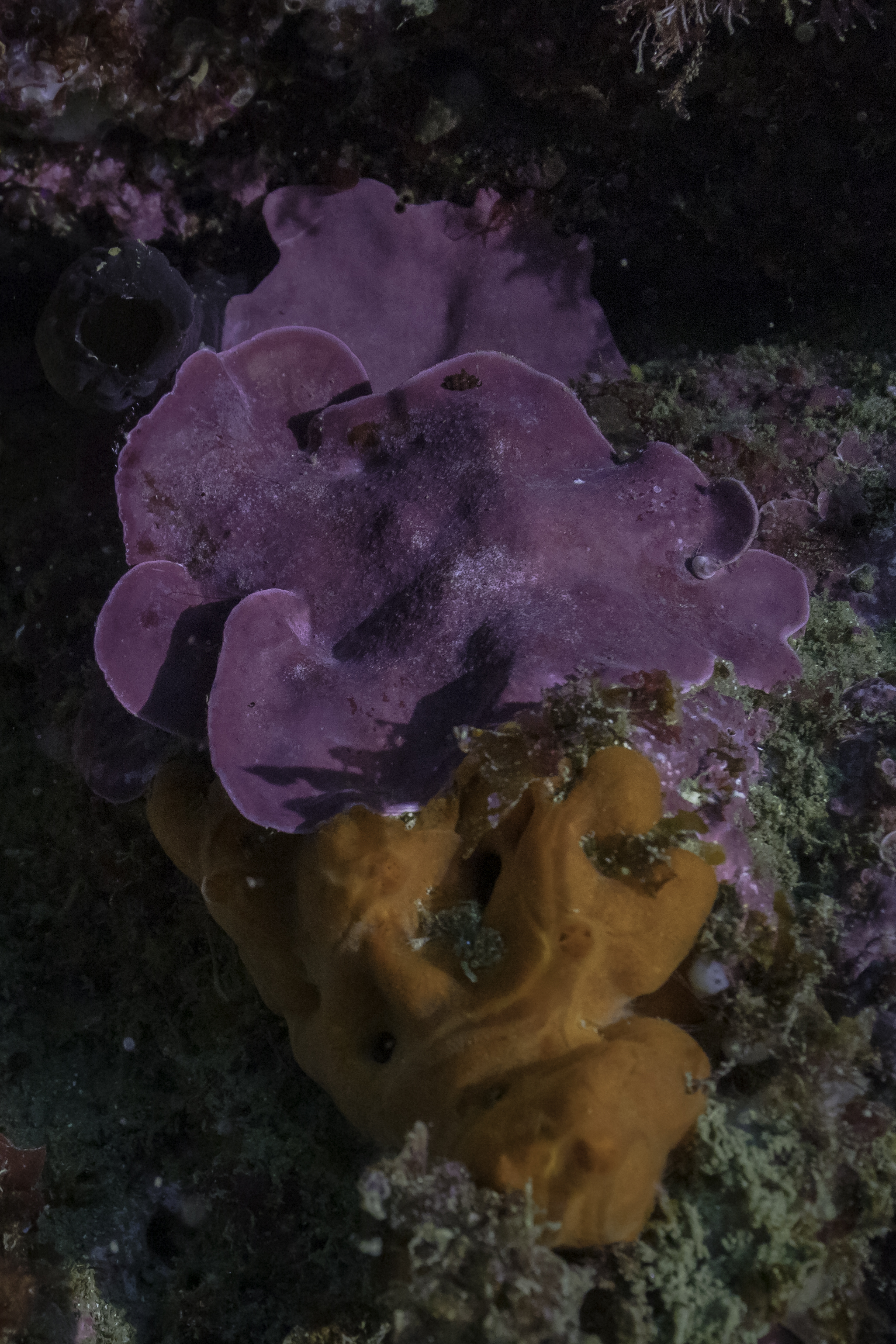
Lithophyllum stictaeforme.

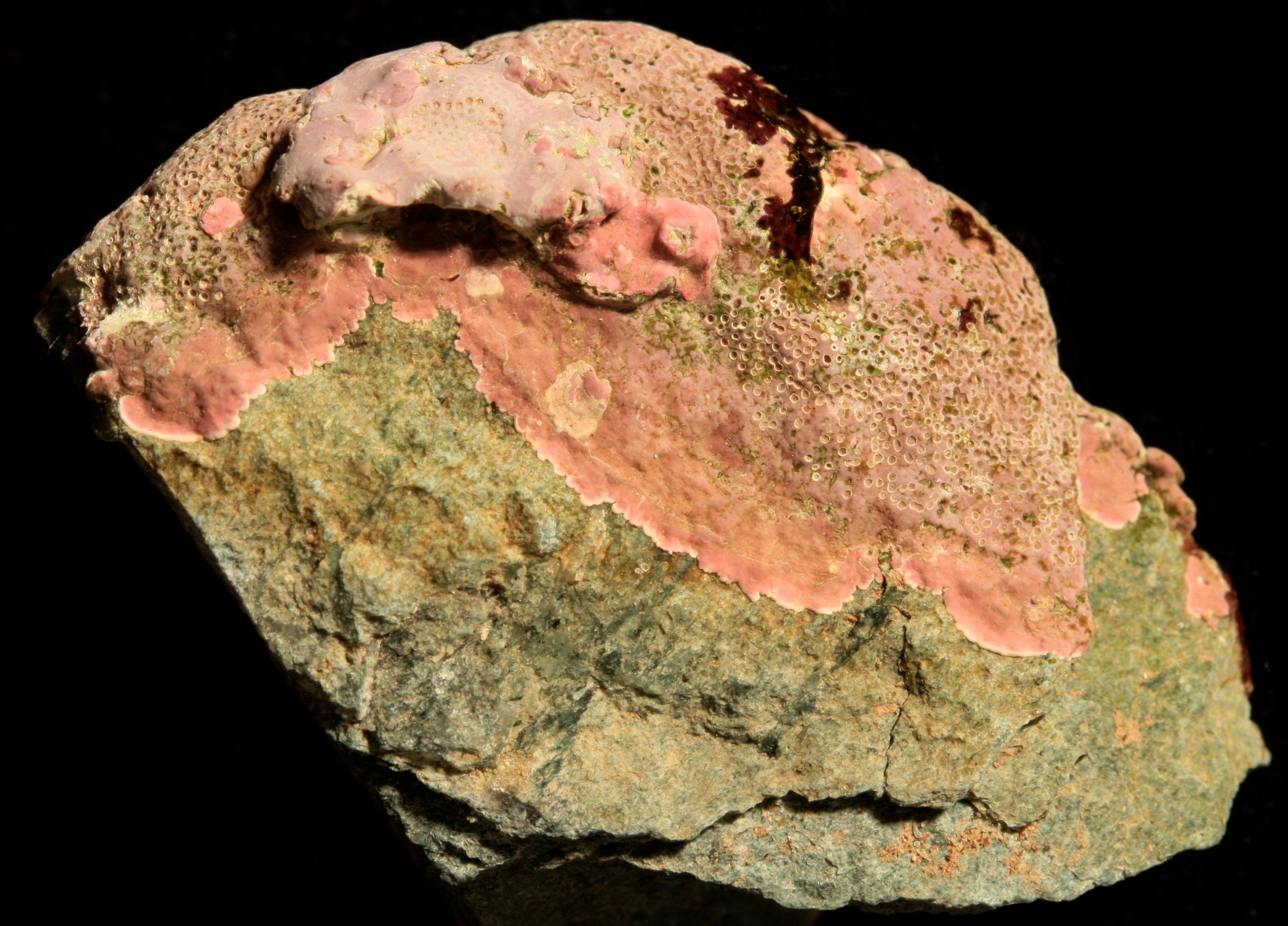
L. orbiculatum on a rock fragment; rock length ~3 cm.

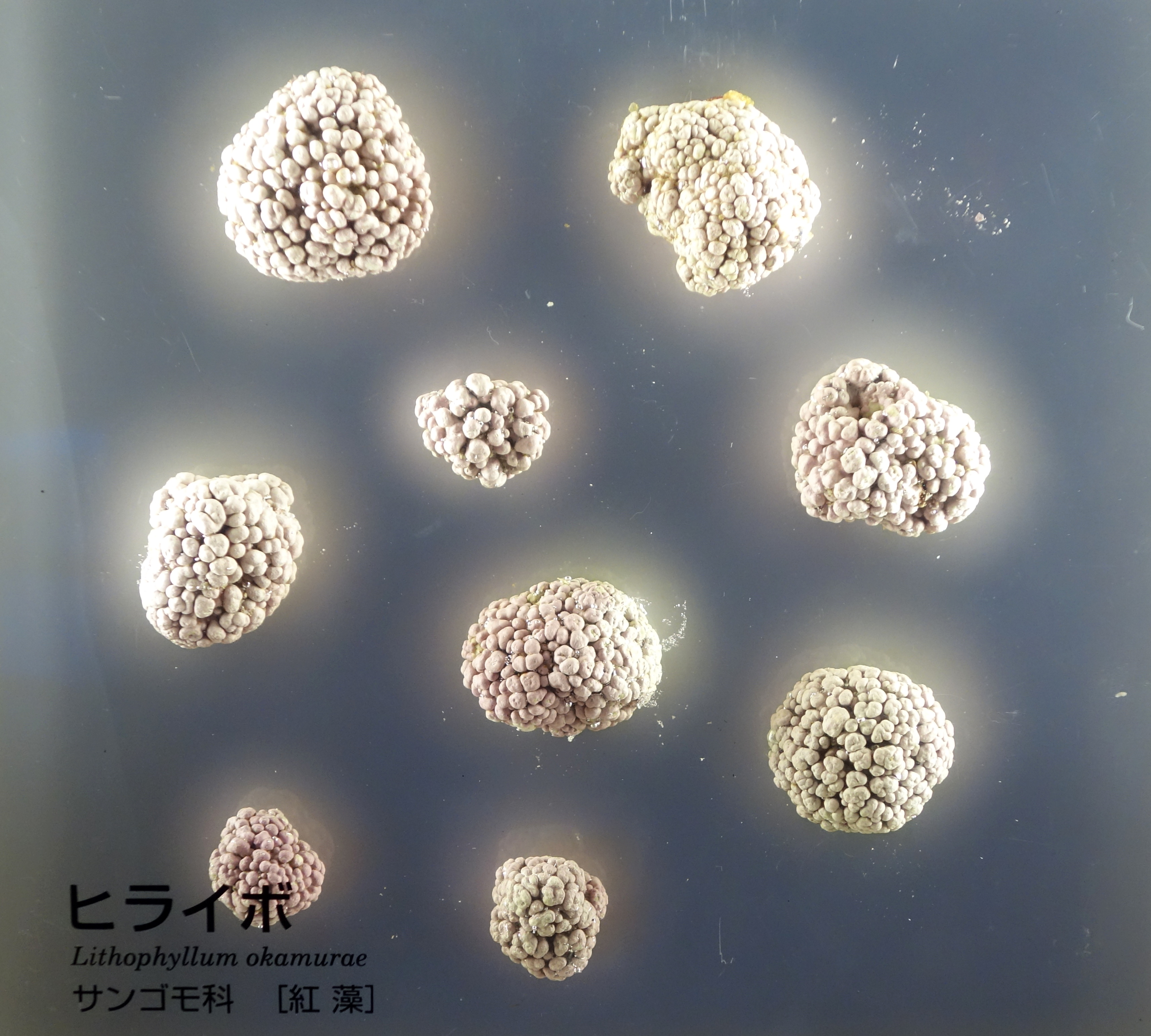
Lithophyllum okamurae

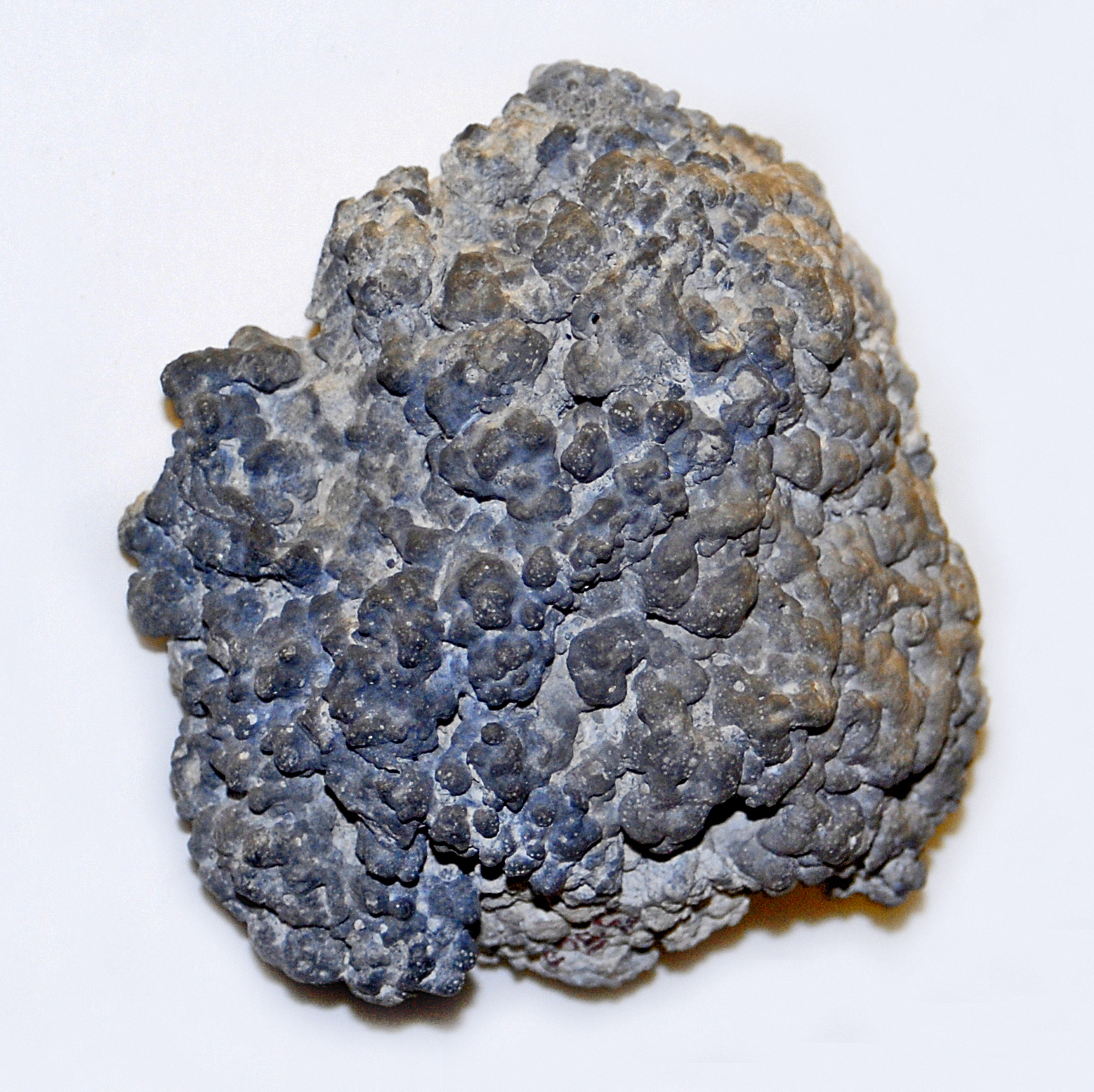
Lithophyllum sp.

== Fossil record ==
This genus is known in the fossil record from the Silurian to the Quaternary (from about 418.7 to 0.0 million years ago). Fossils of species within this genus have been found in Europe, United States, South America, Egypt, Iran, Iraq, India, Japan and Australia.

== Description ==
The monomerous, crustose thalli are composed of a single system of filaments which grow close to the underlying surface. Lithophyllum reproduces by means of conceptacles. The epithallus is periodically shed to avoid organisms growing on top of the alga.

== Species ==
The valid species currently considered to belong to this genus are:

- Lithophyllum acanthinum Foslie, 1907
- Lithophyllum accedens Foslie, 1907
- Lithophyllum acrocamptum Heydrich, 1902
- Lithophyllum aequum Foslie, 1907
- Lithophyllum albanense Lemoine, 1924
- Lithophyllum almanense Lemoine, 1920
- Lithophyllum alternans M. Lemoine, 1929
- Lithophyllum amplostratum W.R. Taylor, 1945
- Lithophyllum aninae Foslie, 1907
- Lithophyllum antillarum Foslie & Howe, 1906
- Lithophyllum atalayense Lemoine, 1920
- Lithophyllum azorum M. Lemoine
- Lithophyllum bahrijense Bosence, 1983
- Lithophyllum balmeri (Heydrich) Heydrich
- Lithophyllum bamleri (Heydrich) Heydrich, 1897
- Lithophyllum belgicum Foslie, 1909
- Lithophyllum bipartitum M. Lemoine
- Lithophyllum brachiatum (Heydrich) M. Lemoine, 1929
- Lithophyllum byssoides (Lamarck) Foslie, 1900
- Lithophyllum californiense Heydrich, 1901
- Lithophyllum canescens (Foslie) Foslie, 1905
- Lithophyllum carpophylli (Heydrich) Heydrich, 1897
- Lithophyllum chamberlainianum Woelkerling & S.J. Campbell, 1992
- Lithophyllum complexum M. Lemoine, 1929
- Lithophyllum congestum (Foslie) Foslie, 1900
- Lithophyllum corallinae (P.L. Crouan & H.M. Crouan) Heydrich, 1897
- Lithophyllum crodelioides Boudouresque
- Lithophyllum cuneatum Keats, 1995
- Lithophyllum cystoseirae (Hauck) Heydrich, 1897
- Lithophyllum decussatum (J. Ellis & Solander) Philippi, 1837
- Lithophyllum dentatum (Kützing), Foslie 1900
- Lithophyllum detrusum Foslie, 1906
- Lithophyllum dispar (Foslie) Foslie, 1909
- Lithophyllum divaricatum M. Lemoine, 1929
- Lithophyllum dublancqui Lemoine, 1918
- Lithophyllum duckerae Woelkerling, 1983
- Lithophyllum elegans (Foslie) Foslie, 1900
- Lithophyllum esperi (M. Lemoine) South & Tittley
- Lithophyllum falkandicum (Foslie) Foslie, 1906
- Lithophyllum fasciculatum (Lamarck) Foslie, 1900
- Lithophyllum fernandezianum Lemoine, 1920
- Lithophyllum fetum Foslie, 1907
- Lithophyllum flavescens Keats, 1997
- Lithophyllum giraudii Lemoine, 1918
- Lithophyllum gracile Foslie
- Lithophyllum grumosum (Foslie) Foslie, 1898
- Lithophyllum hancockii E.Y. Dawson, 1944
- Lithophyllum hermaphroditum (Heydrich) W.J. Woelkerling, 1991
- Lithophyllum hibernicum Foslie, 1906
- Lithophyllum imitans Foslie, 1909
- Lithophyllum impressum Foslie, 1905
- Lithophyllum incrustans Philippi, 1837
- Lithophyllum insipidum Adey, Townsend & Boykins, 1982
- Lithophyllum intermedium Foslie, 1906
- Lithophyllum irregulare (Foslie) Huvé ex Steentoft
- Lithophyllum irvineanum Woelkerling & S.J. Campbell, 1992
- Lithophyllum johansenii Woelkerling & Campbell, 1992
- Lithophyllum kotschyanum Unger, 1858
- Lithophyllum lapidea Foslie, 1906
- Lithophyllum leptothalloideum Pilger
- Lithophyllum lithophylloides Heydrich, 1901
- Lithophyllum lividum Lemoine, 1930
- Lithophyllum margaritae (Hariot) Heydrich, 1901
- Lithophyllum mgarrense Bosence, 1983
- Lithophyllum mutabile M. Lemonie, 1929
- Lithophyllum neoatalayense Masaki, 1968
- Lithophyllum nitorum W.H. Adey & P.J. Adey, 1973
- Lithophyllum okamurae Foslie, 1900
- Lithophyllum orbiculatum (Foslie) Foslie, 1900
- Lithophyllum pallescens (Foslie) Foslie, 1900
- Lithophyllum papillosum Zanardini ex Hauck, 1885
- Lithophyllum paradoxum Foslie, 1908
- Lithophyllum pinguiense Heydrich, 1901
- Lithophyllum polycarpum Zanardini
- Lithophyllum polycephalum Foslie
- Lithophyllum polyclonum Foslie, 1905
- Lithophyllum prelichenoides M. Lemoine, 1939
- Lithophyllum premoluccense Lemoine, 1918
- Lithophyllum preprototypum Me. Lemoine, 1917
- Lithophyllum proboscideum (Foslie) Foslie, 1900
- Lithophyllum prototypum (Foslie) Foslie, 1905
- Lithophyllum punctatum Foslie, 1906
- Lithophyllum pustulatum (J.V. Lamouroux) Foslie, 1904
- Lithophyllum pygmaeum (Heydrich) Heydrich, 1897
- Lithophyllum racemus (Lamarck) Foslie, 1901
- Lithophyllum reesei E.Y. Dawson, 1960
- Lithophyllum retusum (Foslie) Foslie
- Lithophyllum rileyi M. Lemoine, 1929
- Lithophyllum rugosum (Foslie) Lemoine, 1913
- Lithophyllum sancti-georgei M. Lemoine, 1929
- Lithophyllum shioense Foslie, 1906
- Lithophyllum sierra-blancae Howe, 1934
- Lithophyllum simile Foslie, 1909
- Lithophyllum skottsbergii Lemoine, 1920
- Lithophyllum stephensonii (M. Lemoine)
- Lithophyllum stictaeforme (J.E. Areschoug) Hauck, 1878
- Lithophyllum subantarcticum (Foslie) Foslie, 1907
- Lithophyllum subreduncum Foslie
- Lithophyllum subtenellum (Foslie) Foslie, 1909
- Lithophyllum tarentinum Mastrorilli
- Lithophyllum tedeschii P. Fravega, M. Piazza & G. Vannucci, 1993
- Lithophyllum tortuosum (Esper) Foslie, 1900
- Lithophyllum trinidadense Lemoine, 1917
- Lithophyllum tuberculatum Foslie, 1906
- Lithophyllum tumidulum Foslie, 1901
- Lithophyllum uvaria M. Lemoine, 1924
- Lithophyllum veleroae E.Y. Dawson, 1944
- Lithophyllum yessoense Foslie, 1909

== Bibliography ==
- Philippi, R.A. (1837). Beweis, dass die Nulliporen Pflanzen sind. Archiv für Naturgeschichte 3: 387–393, figs 2–6, pl. IX.
- Foslie, M. (1900). Revised systematical survey of the Melobesieae. Kongelige Norske Videnskabers Selskabs Skrifter 1900(5): 1–22.
- Woelkerling, W.J. (1998). Lamarck's nullipores. In: Non-geniculate Coralline Red Algae and the Paris Muséum: Systematics and Scientific History. (Woelkerling, W.J. & Lamy, D. Eds), pp. 101–404. Paris: Publications Scientifiques du Muséum/A.D.A.C.
