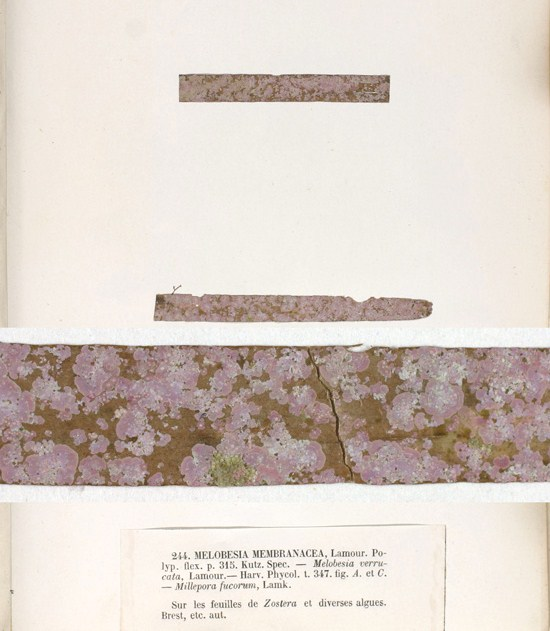

Scientific classification
- Clade: Archaeplastida
- Division: Rhodophyta
- Class: Florideophyceae
- Order: Corallinales
- Family: Hapalidiaceae
- Genus: Melobesia
- Species: M. membranacea

Binomial name
- Melobesia membranacea (Esper) Lamouroux

= Melobesia membranacea =

Species of alga

Melobesia membranacea is a small marine alga encrusting on the surface of other algae. In the division of the Rhodophyta.

== Description ==
This small marine algae grows lightly encrusting as a thin epiphyte on other algae growing to 5 cm in diameter and c 90 micrometre thick. Conceptacles small but raised and visible.

== Reproduction ==
Carposporangial and tetrasporangial conceptacles are common.

== Habitat ==
Very common growing epiphytically on other algae in the littoral and sublittoral on Furcellaria, Mastocarpus stellatus, Chondrus and other algae, in the low littoral and sub-littoral.

== Distribution ==
Common all around the British Isles, including the Isle of Man and the Shetland Islands. Holland to Cape Verde, Mediterranean, Canada, East Coast of the United States, Australia, and New Zealand.
