= Lithothamnion glaciale =

Scientific classification
- Clade: Archaeplastida
- Division: Rhodophyta
- Class: Florideophyceae
- Order: Corallinales
- Family: Hapalidiaceae
- Genus: Lithothamnion
- Species: L. glaciale

Binomial name
- Lithothamnion glaciale Kjellman

Species of alga

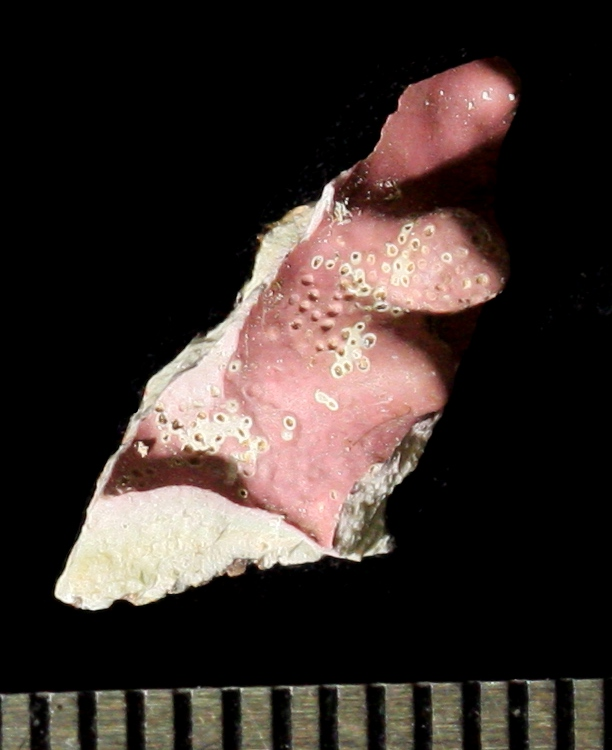

Lithothamnion glaciale is the botanical name for a species of multicellular red algae of the genus Lithothamnion, subfamily Melobesioideae.

== Description ==
Lithothamnion glaciale grows as an encrusting, chalky thallus, deep reddish in colour and up to 20cm in diameter and 4mm thick. It develops simple cylindrical branches growing to 15mm long and 4mm in diameter.

== Reproduction ==
These algae are dioecious, with domed spermatangial conceptacles, carpogonial conceptacles and carposporangial conceptacles.

== Habitat ==
Lithothamnion glaciale are present in coralline algae beds in many regions of the Arctic. They are also present in marine habitats in temperate waters where higher average temperatures prevail. It grows on the surface of rock in low-littoral pools and in the sublittoral to 34m.
