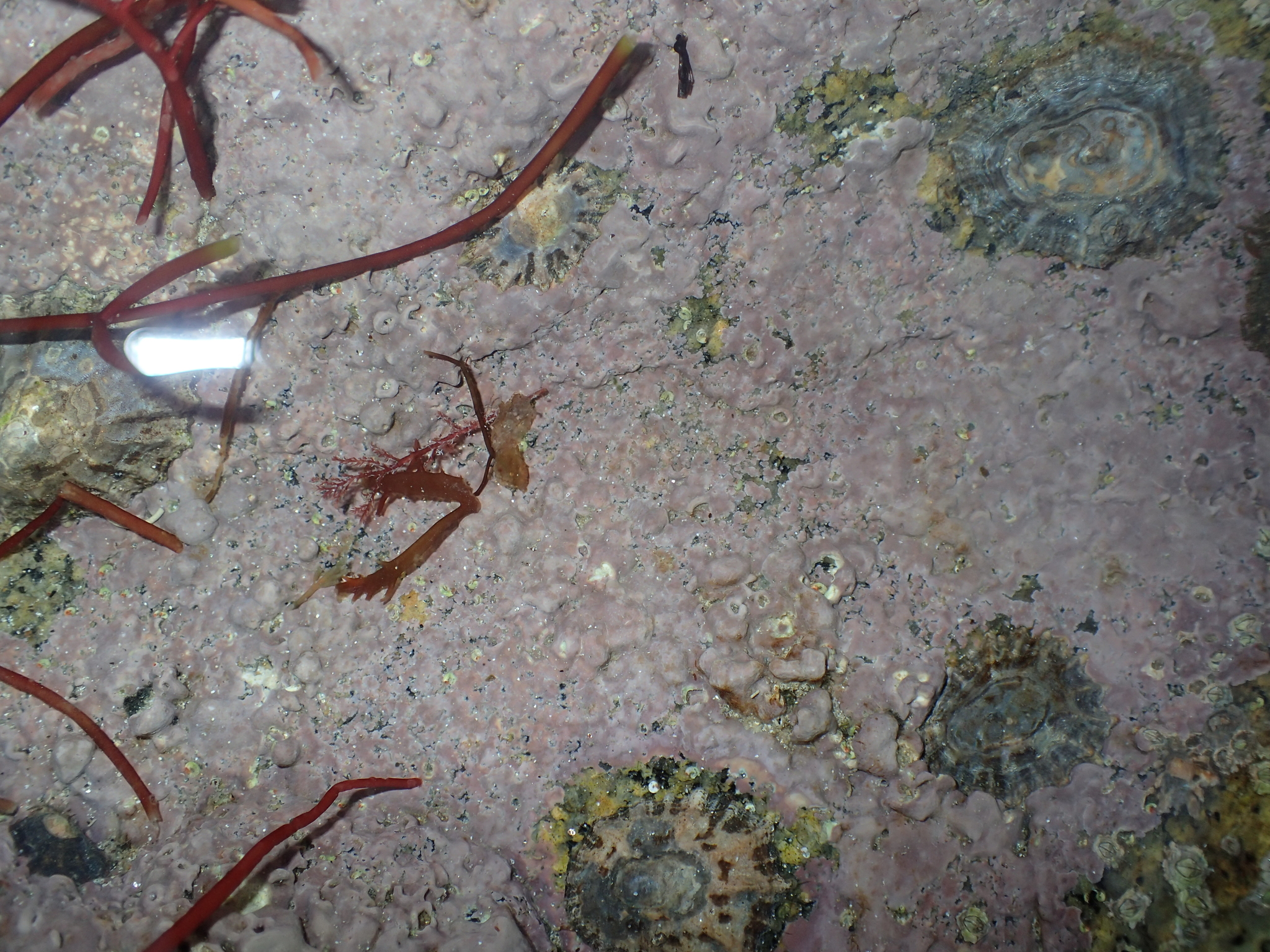

Scientific classification
- Clade: Archaeplastida
- Division: Rhodophyta
- Class: Florideophyceae
- Order: Corallinales
- Family: Hapalidiaceae
- Genus: Phymatolithon
- Species: P. lenormandii

Binomial name
- Phymatolithon lenormandii (Areschoug) W.H.Adey

= Phymatolithon lenormandii =

Species of alga

Phymatolithon lenormandii is a common red alga.

== Description ==
Phymatolithon lenormandii is a thin alga growing encrusting as a thin flat chalky thallus clearly without branches. The thallus grows to 0.6 mm thick with a smooth surface. In colour it is mauvish or pinkish like a thin painted surface forming a patchwork when meeting other incrusting algae.

== Habitat ==
Common, epilithic on rock and shells in the literal and sublittoral to a depth of 30m, growing best in shady sites.

== Reproduction ==
Monecious or dioecious with conceptacles, carpospogonia and tetrasporangial conceptacles forming raised chambers.

== Distribution ==
Common around Ireland, Great Britain, the Isle of Man and the Channel Isles. In Europe it is recorded from Norway to the Mediterranean. World-wide from Canada USA Mexico, Japan and southern America.
