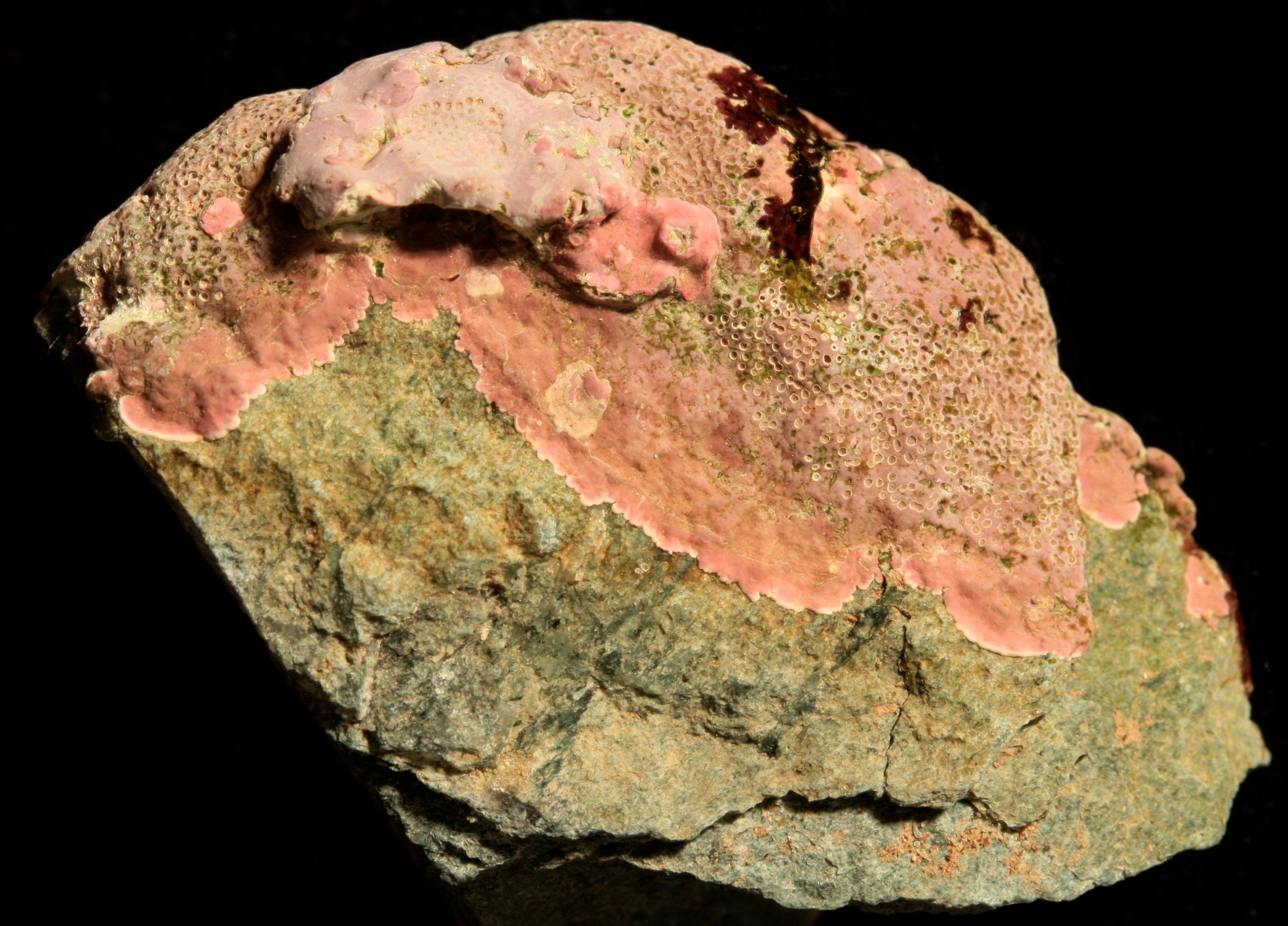
- Lithophyllum orbiculatum on a rock fragment; rock length ~3 cm.

Scientific classification
- Clade: Archaeplastida
- Division: Rhodophyta
- Class: Florideophyceae
- Order: Corallinales
- Family: Corallinaceae
- Subfamily: Lithophylloideae

Genera
- Amphiroa; Ezo; Lithophyllum (= Titanoderma); Lithothrix; Paulsilvella; Tenarea

= Lithophylloideae =

Subfamily of algae

The Lithophylloideae are a monophyletic subfamily of Corallinaceaen Coralline algae with uniporate conceptacles.
