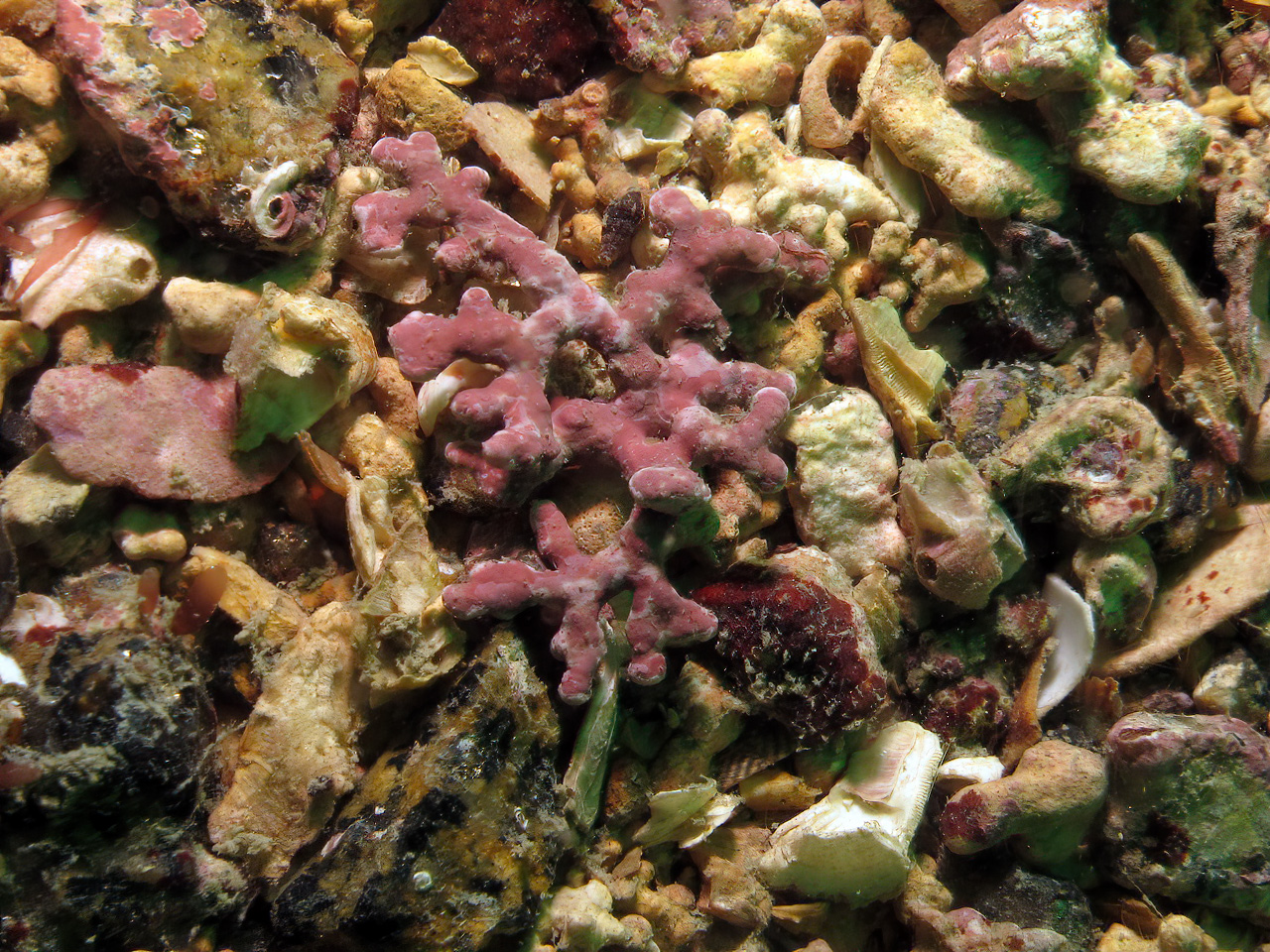
- Phymatolithon calcareum

Scientific classification
- Domain: Eukaryota
- Clade: Archaeplastida
- Division: Rhodophyta
- Class: Florideophyceae
- Order: Corallinales
- Family: Hapalidiaceae
- Genus: Phymatolithon; Foslie, 1898

Species
- At least 11, including: Phymatolithon bornetii; Phymatolithon calcareum; Phymatolithon elatum Chamberlain, 1990; Phymatolithon laeve; Phymatolithon lenormandii (Areschoug) W.H.Adey

Synonyms
- Leptophytum Adey, 1966

= Phymatolithon =

Genus of algae

Phymatolithon is a genus of non geniculate coralline red algae, known from the UK, and Australia. It is encrusting, flat, and unbranched; it has tetrasporangia and bisporangia borne in multiporate conceptacles. Some of its cells bear small holes in the middle; this distinctive thallus texture is termed a "Leptophytum-type" thallus surface, and has been posited as a taxonomically informative character. It periodically sloughs off its epithallus, reducing its overgrowth by algae by as much as 50% compared to bare rock.
