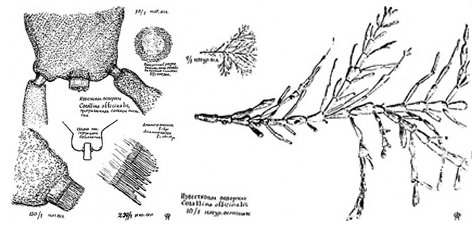

Scientific classification
- Domain: Eukaryota
- Clade: Archaeplastida
- Division: Rhodophyta
- Class: Florideophyceae
- Order: Corallinales
- Family: Corallinaceae
- Genus: Corallina
- Species: C. officinalis

Binomial name
- Corallina officinalis Linnaeus, 1758

= Corallina officinalis =

Species of alga

Corallina officinalis is a calcareous red seaweed which grows in the lower and mid-littoral zones on rocky shores.

It is primarily found growing around the rims of tide pools, but can be found in shallow crevices anywhere on the rocky shore that are regularly refreshed with sea water. It predominantly grows on the lower shore, especially where fucoid algae are absent, but is also found further up shore on exposed coasts.

It forms calcium carbonate deposits within its cells which serve to strengthen the thallus. These white deposits cause the seaweed to appear pink in colour, with white patches where the calcium carbonate is particularly concentrated, such as at the growing tips. The calcium carbonate makes it unpalatable to most rocky shore grazers.

== Description ==
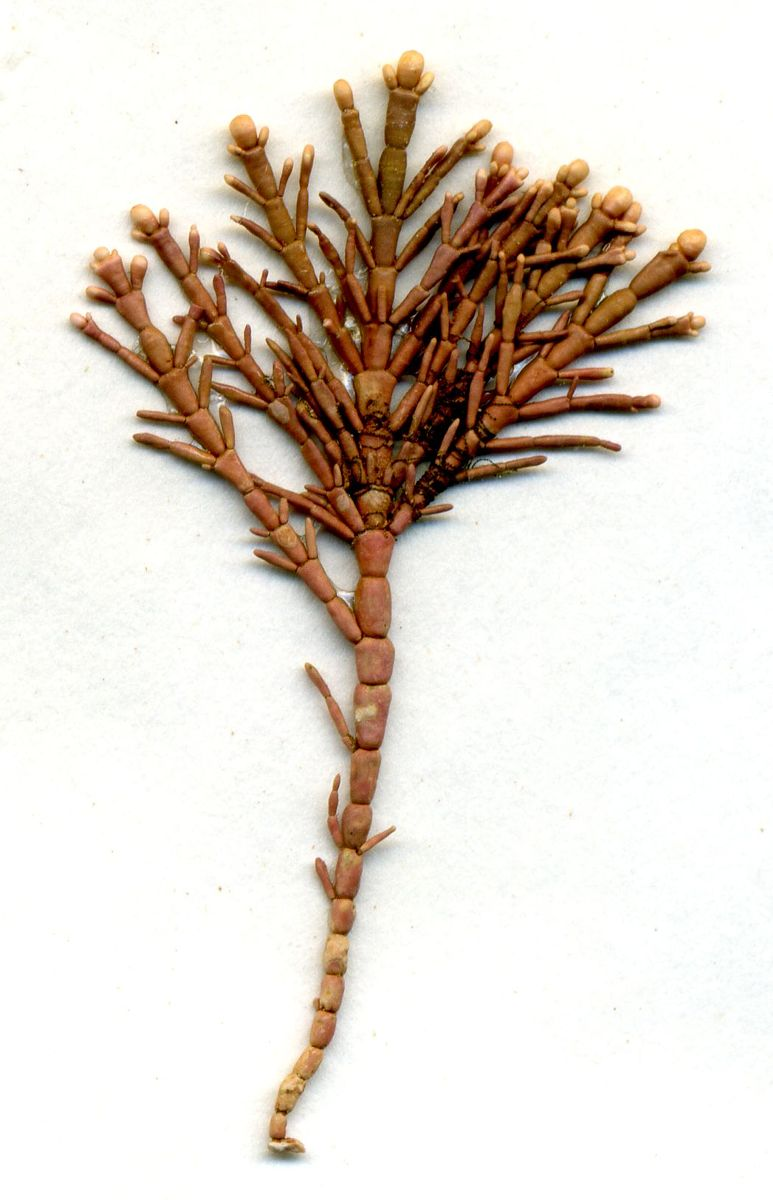
Corallina officinalis L., herbarium sheet. Collected in Heligoland, Germany

The thallus of C. officinalis is firmly attached generally to rock and grows in tufts to a length of 120mm. It has articulated pinnate branching with successive opposite lateral branches. Each frond consists of cylindrical calcified stipes which show segments each a little longer than broad, rising from a crustose base like a string of beads becoming larger and more wedge-shaped higher up the stipe. In colour the fronds are pinkish, it may bleach to white when exposed to sunlight.

== Reproduction ==
The sexes exist on separate plants and appear as small chalky nodules.

== Ecology ==
Corallina grows on rocks in rock pools and occasionally on shells or other algae, at mid-littoral to 33m deep, it provides a habitat for many small animals which feed on the microorganisms dwelling in its dense tufts.

== Distribution ==
C. officinalis is common, to be found on solid rock around Great Britain, Ireland and Isle of Man. Also recorded from the North Atlantic coast, from northern Norway to Morocco, and intermittently from Greenland to Argentina. Corallina is also found in USA, Argentina and elsewhere including some parts of Japan, China, Australia and New Zealand. In New Zealand this species is found on the intertidal zone of the coasts of the Kermadec Islands, the North, South, Chatham and Stewart Islands as well as the Antipodes and Auckland Islands.
