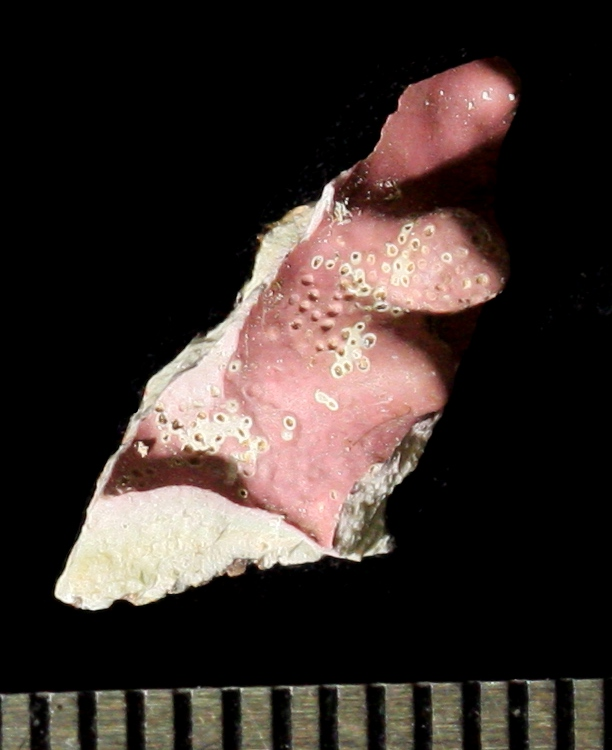
- Lithothamnion glaciale showing conceptacles. Millimetre scale

Scientific classification
- Clade: Archaeplastida
- Division: Rhodophyta
- Class: Florideophyceae
- Order: Corallinales
- Family: Hapalidiaceae
- Subfamily: Melobesioideae; Bizzozero, 1885

Genera
- Leptophytum; Lithothamnion; Melobesioidea; Mesophyllum; Phymatolithon

= Melobesioideae =

Subfamily of algae

The Melobesioideae are a subfamily of Corallinacean Coralline algae with multiporate conceptacles.
