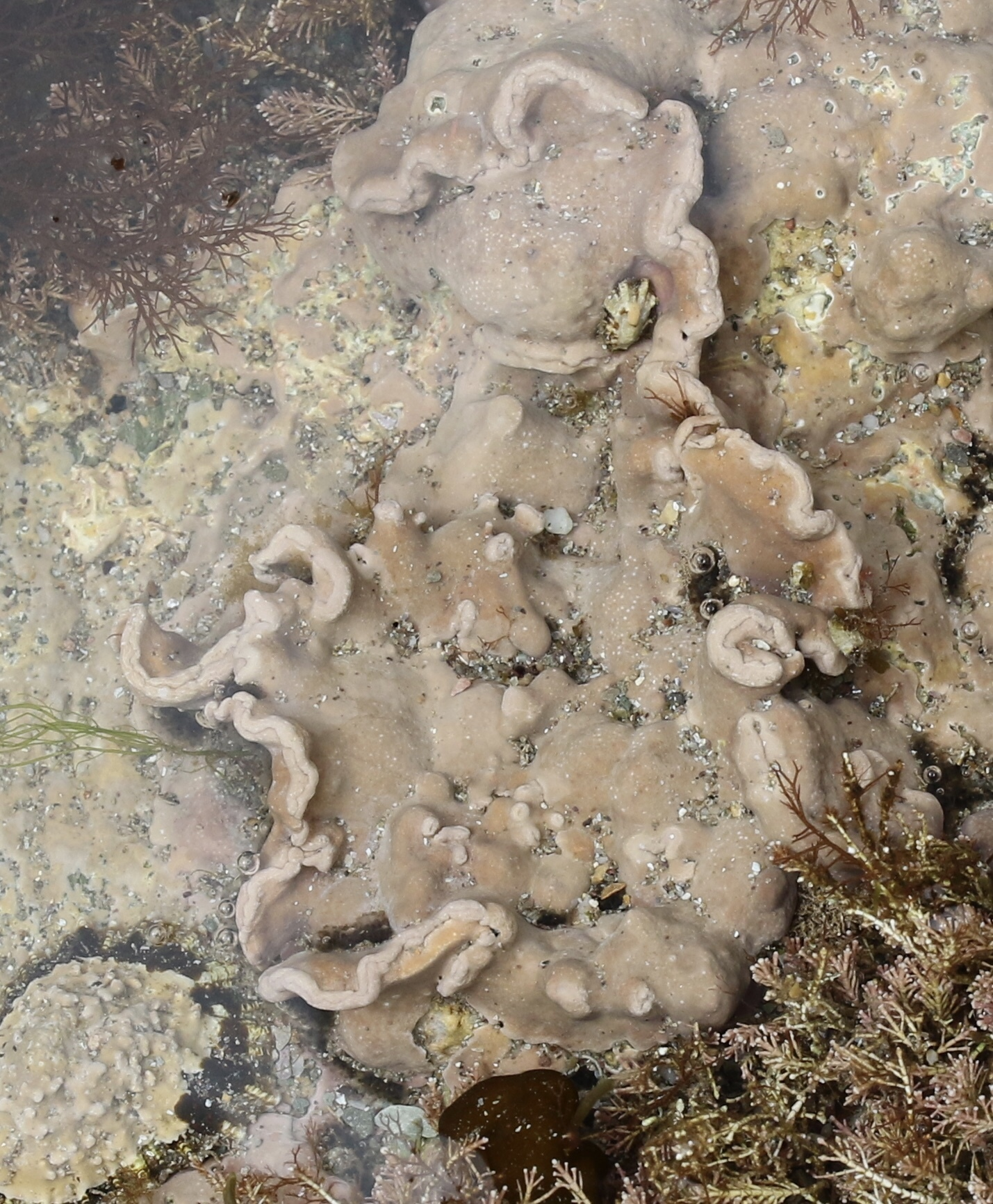

Scientific classification
- Clade: Archaeplastida
- Division: Rhodophyta
- Class: Florideophyceae
- Order: Corallinales
- Family: Corallinaceae
- Genus: Lithophyllum
- Species: L. incrustans

Binomial name
- Lithophyllum incrustans Philippi, 1837

Synonyms
- Crodelia incrustans (Philippi) Heydrich, 1911; Hyperantherella incrustans (Philippi) Heydrich, 1901; Lithophyllum incrustans f. angulata Foslie; Lithothamnion incrustans (Philippi) Foslie, 1895; Lithothamnion incrustans f. depressum (P.L.Crouan & H.M.Crouan) Foslie, 1895 (synonym); Lithothamnion polymorphum f. confluens (Kützing) Vinassa, 1892 (synonym); Spongites confluens Kützing, 1841

= Lithophyllum incrustans =

Species of alga

Lithophyllum incrustans, also known by its common names coraline crust and paint weed, is a small pinkish species of seaweed.

== Description ==
This is a small encrusting, calcareous alga, growing epiphytically as a flat lobed plant up to 10 cm in diameter and up to several mm forming thick adherent crusts. It can become knobbly with overlapping lobes and a smooth surface. In colour it is pinkish but may become bleached.

== Reproduction ==
Tetrasporangial and bisporangial conceptacles occur sunken pits. Plants usually gametangial, Spermatangial conceptacles in shallow chambers. Carposporangial chambers flask-shaped.

== Distribution ==
Found all around the Great Britain, Ireland, the Isle of Man and the Channel Islands, rarer on the east coast of England. In Europe recorded from Faroes, Norway to the Mediterranean.

== Ecology ==
Common in shallow pools and under cover. Grows abundantly in the mid-littoral to 8 metres depth.

== Other External links ==
Dickinson, C.I. 1963. British Seaweeds. Eyre & Spottisqoode
