= Hypothallus =

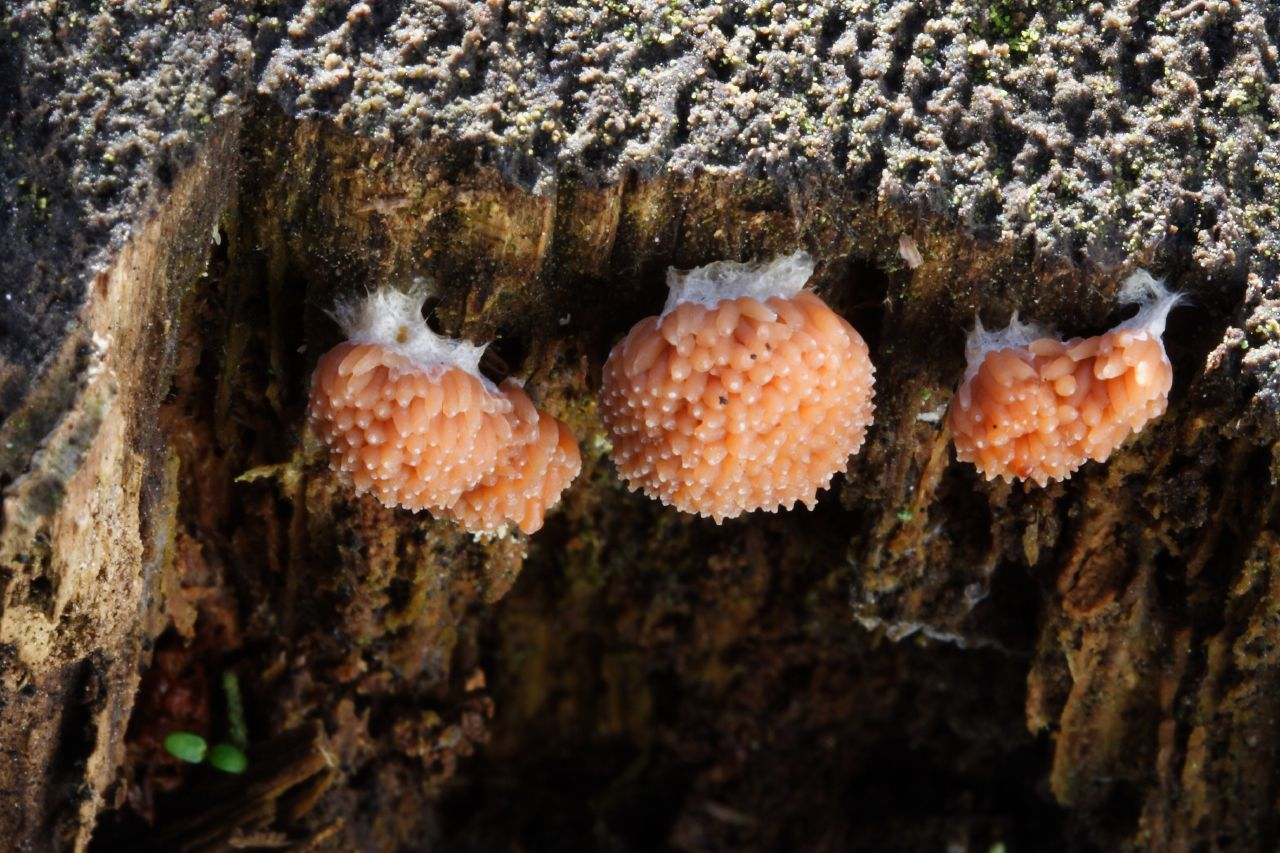
Fruit body of a slime mold, possibly Tubifera ferruginosa. The clearly visible white material is the hypothallus.

In true slime molds (myxogastria), lichens, and in species of the family Clavicipitaceae, the hypothallus is the layer on which the fruit body sits, lying in contact with the substrate. The word is derived from the Ancient Greek root hypó ("under") and thallós ("shoot" or "thallus").

The hypothallus is produced by the plasmodium at the beginning of fructification. Depending on the species, it can be membranous to thick or tender to solid and nearly transparent to brightly coloured. It may surround an individual fruit body, or may form a contiguous connection between multiple fruit bodies. In some rare cases it is missing entirely.

In crustose lichens, the hypothallus is the blackish lower layer of the thallus that produces rhizines, which are holdfasts that attach the lichen to its substrate.

In some taxa the hypothallus may be involved in the formation of the fruit body. In the "epihypothallic" Stemonitida, the hypothallus forms hollow, tubular stems and a columella, up which the remaining plasmodium then rises, producing the spores. In all other myxogastria "subhypothallic" development takes place. Here, the hypothallus produces a layer on the plasmodium, which creates the rooms of the single fruit bodies during fructification. As the surrounding plasmodium flows in the fruit body, the hypothallus will lie directly on the substrate, shrinking and creating the edge of the mature fruit body. Here, the hypothallus is part of a morphological unit with peridium and stem, which serves as a membranous surface of the whole structure with the spores. Epihypothaly is an autapomorphy of the stemonitida and is, in comparison to subhypothaly, a primitive feature.

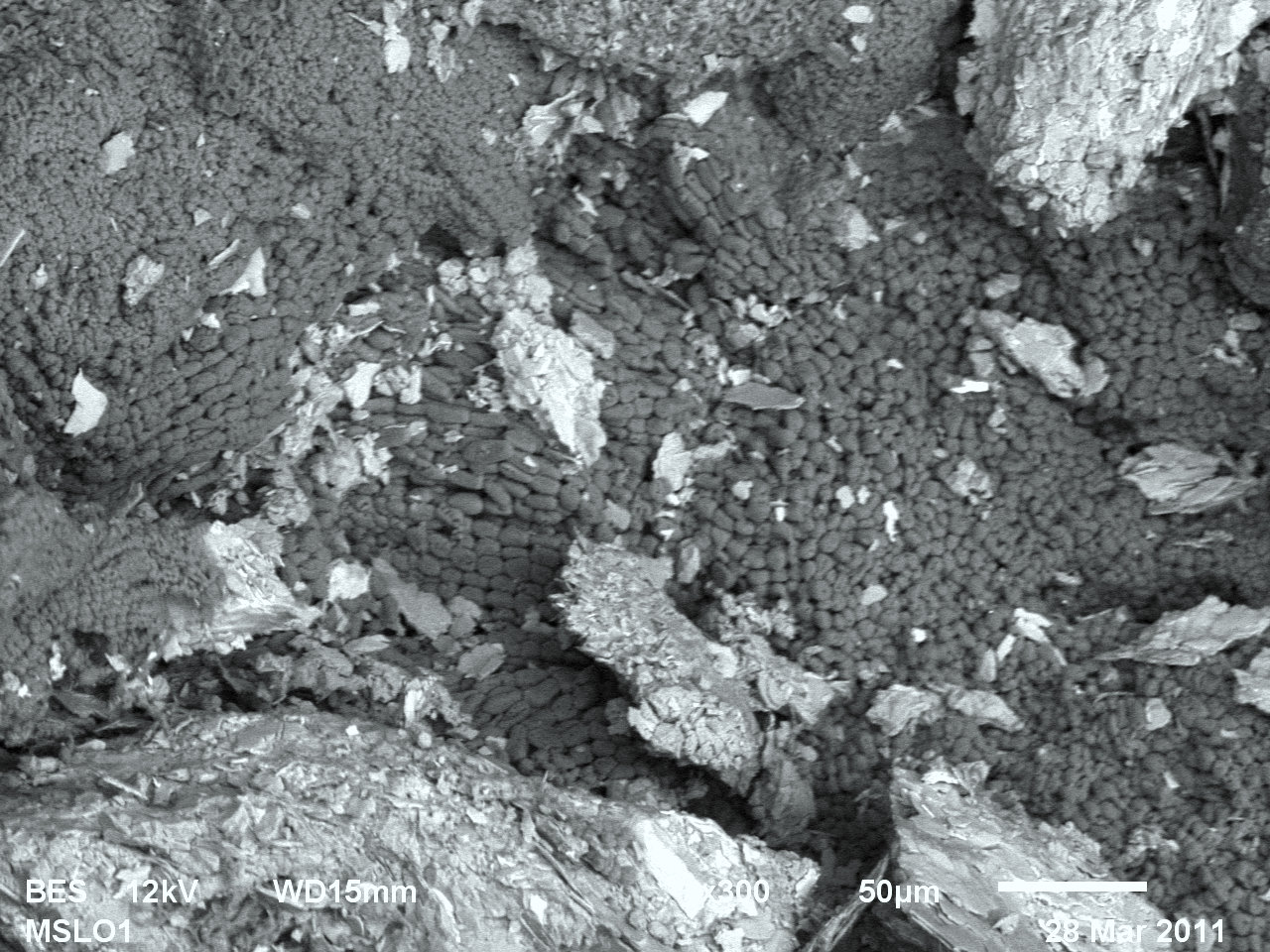
Undersurface of Lithophyllum orbiculatum, showing hypothallus and perithallus
