= Leptofauchea coralligena =

Scientific classification
- Clade: Archaeplastida
- Division: Rhodophyta
- Class: Florideophyceae
- Order: Rhodymeniales
- Family: Faucheaceae
- Genus: Leptofauchea
- Species: L. coralligena

Binomial name
- Leptofauchea coralligena De Clerck

Species of alga

Leptofauchea coralligena is a species of red algae that was first discovered in the Mediterranean Sea in 2007. Molecular analysis determined that Rhodymenia ardissonei was in fact two distinct species. Rhodymenia ardissonei lives in relatively shallow water whereas Leptofauchea coralligena lives in deeper waters.
