= Epithallus =

The epithallium or epithallus is the outer layer of a crustose coralline alga, which in some species is periodically shed to prevent organisms from attaching to and overgrowing the alga.

== Structure ==
It is defined as the cells above the intercalary meristem; these are not involved in photosynthesis. In Phymatolithon, the epithallium is usually one cell thick, whereas in other genera, such as Pseudolithophyllum, multiple cells exist, with the thickness determined by the difference between their rate of production at the intercalary meristem, and the rate of shedding at the surface; thicknesses of 16 cells or more, spanning 100 μm, have been measured in a representative coralline (Clathromorphum). The thickness is variable within species; in Lithothamnion, a single cell thickness is the norm, but three- or four-cell thick regions are also common. The epithallus sometimes overlies the roof of conceptacles, which are exposed only when the overlying epithallus is eventually shed.

The epithallium is less strongly calcified than the underlying cells, facilitating its removal. The meristem itself is the least calcified portion; sometimes there is no mineralization at all, which makes it a plane of weakness where breaking often occurs.

== Function ==
Periodic sloughing of this surface is thought to reduce colonization of corallines by kelp (such as Laminaria), epiphytes, and sessile invertebrates. Epithallial cells are covered (in patches) by a cuticle. The deterioration of the outer cells is accelerated in the presence of bacteria.

== Comparable structures ==
A similar mechanism is found in geniculate reds. Epidermal tissue is also shed by unrelated algae: the fleshy reds and browns, (e.g. Chondrus, Ascophyllum; Halidrys, Himanthalia) and the calcaerous greens. Some sea grasses also periodically shed their external cell walls to avoid epiphyte cover. In the browns, this is accomplished by shedding cell wall material, without damaging the underlying cells.

The epithallus probably originated from cover cells, which are considered to be homologous structures.

== Refs ==
NB incomplete citations refer to references in Johnson & Mann (1986).
