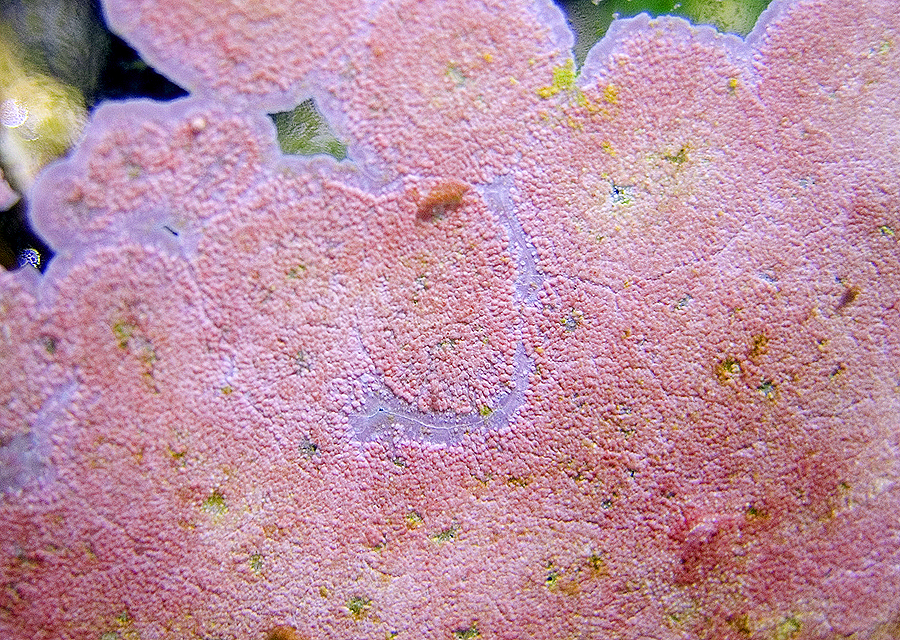
- Unknown crustose Coralline on aquarium glass
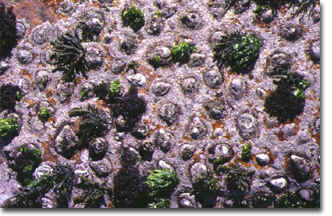
- Spongites yendoi together with the gardening limpet Scutellastra cochlear

Scientific classification
- Domain: Eukaryota
- Supergroup: Archaeplastida
- Division: Rhodophyta
- Class: Florideophyceae
- Subclass: Corallinophycidae
- Order: Corallinales; Silva & Johansen, 1986

Families and subfamilies
- Families: Corallinaceae; Lithophylloideae; Mastophoroideae; Metagoniolithoideae; Corallinoideae; Hapalidiaceae; Austrolithoideae; Choreonematoideae; Melobesioideae; Sporolithaceae; stem group families: †Solenoporaceae; †Archaeolithophyllaceae (ancestral to Corallinaceae)

= Coralline algae =

Coralline algae Temporal range: Ordovician–recent

Order of algae (Corallinales)

Coralline algae are red algae in the order Corallinales, characterized by a thallus containing calcareous deposits within its cell walls, giving it hardness. The colors of these algae are typically some hue of pink, or another shade of red, but some species can be purple, yellow, blue, white, or gray-green. Typically, these algae grow in a crustose manner (encrusting rocks and other hardscape); in the intertidal zone of rocky shorelines, and within coral reefs, these algae appear as an abundance of colorful patches on rock surfaces. Unattached specimens (maerl, rhodoliths) may form relatively smooth compact balls, and use underwater photosynthesis to get food or forming warty to fruticose thalli.

The red algae belong to the division Rhodophyta, within which the coralline algae form the order Corallinales. There are over 1600 described species of nongeniculate coralline algae. The corallines are presently grouped into two families on the basis of their reproductive structures. Most are marine, though one species lives in freshwater; Pneophyllum cetinaensis.

Coralline algae play an important role in the ecology of coral reefs. Sea urchins, parrot fish, along with limpets and chitons (both mollusks) feed on coralline algae. In the temperate Mediterranean Sea, coralline algae are the main builders of a typical algal reef, the Coralligène ("coralligenous").

== Description ==
=== Forms ===
Corallines have been divided into two groups based on their growth forms, although this division does not conform to taxonomic grouping:

- the geniculate (articulated) corallines;
- the nongeniculate (nonarticulated) corallines.

Geniculate corallines are branching, tree-like organisms which are attached to the substratum by being crustose or possessing calcified, root-like holdfasts. The organisms are made flexible by having non-calcified sections (genicula) separating longer calcified sections (intergenicula). Nongeniculate corallines range from a few micrometres to several centimetres thick crusts. They are often very slow growing, and may occur on rock, coral skeletons, shells, other algae or seagrasses (being epiphytes). Crusts may be thin and leafy to thick and strongly adherent. Some are parasitic or partly endophytic on other corallines. Many coralline crusts produce knobby protuberances ranging from a millimetre to several centimetres high. Some are free-living as rhodoliths (rounded, free-living specimens). The morphological complexity of rhodoliths enhances species diversity, and can be used as a non-taxonomic descriptor for monitoring.

=== Growth ===
Corallines, especially encrusting forms, are slow growers, and expand by 0.1–80 millimetres (0.0039–3.1496 in) annually. All corallines begin with a crustose stage; some later become frondose.

The thalli can be divided into three layers: the hypothallus, perithallus and epithallus. The epithallus is periodically shed, either in sheets or piecemeal.

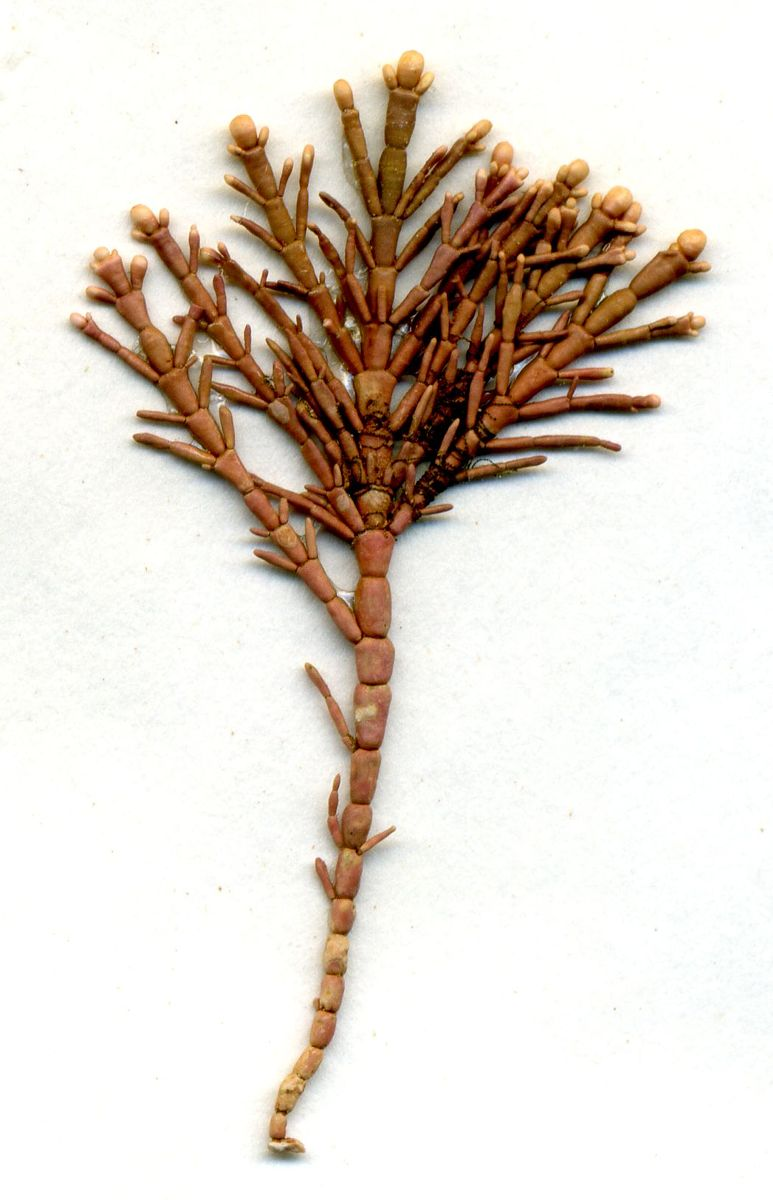
Corallina officinalis

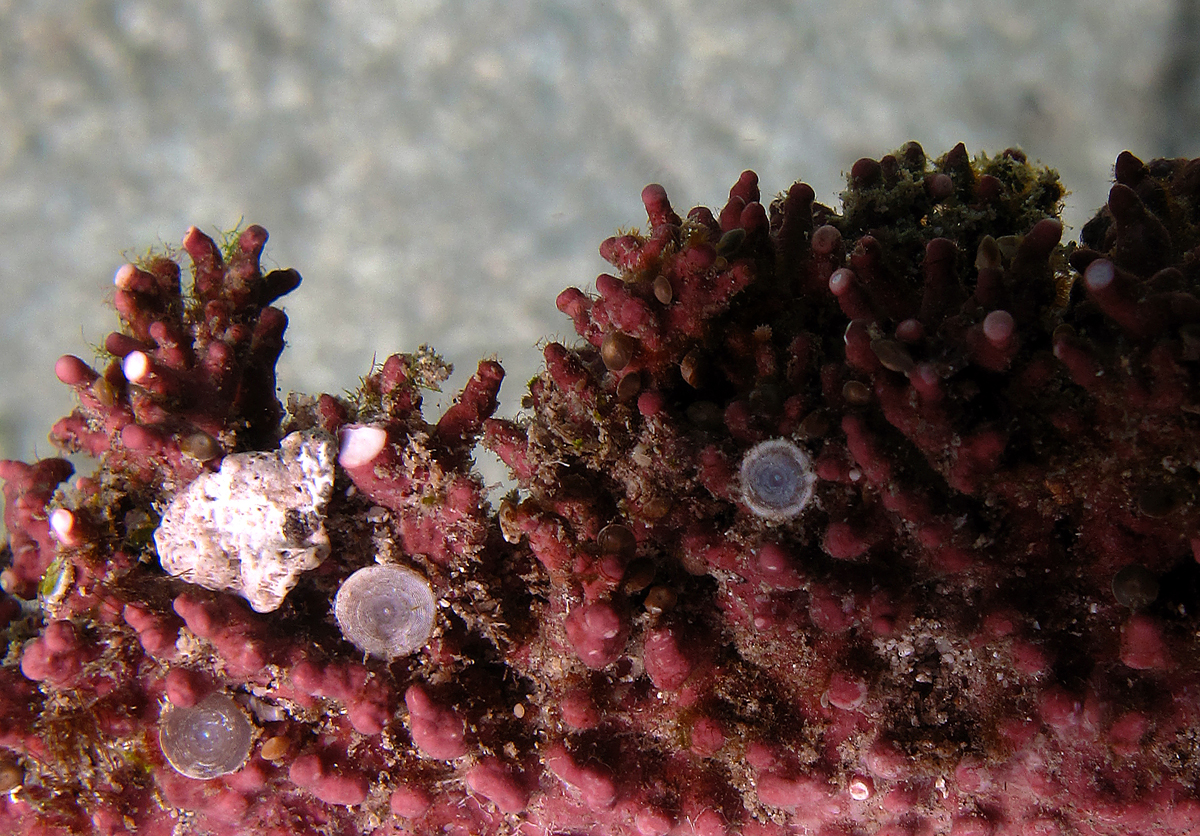
Lithothamnion sp.

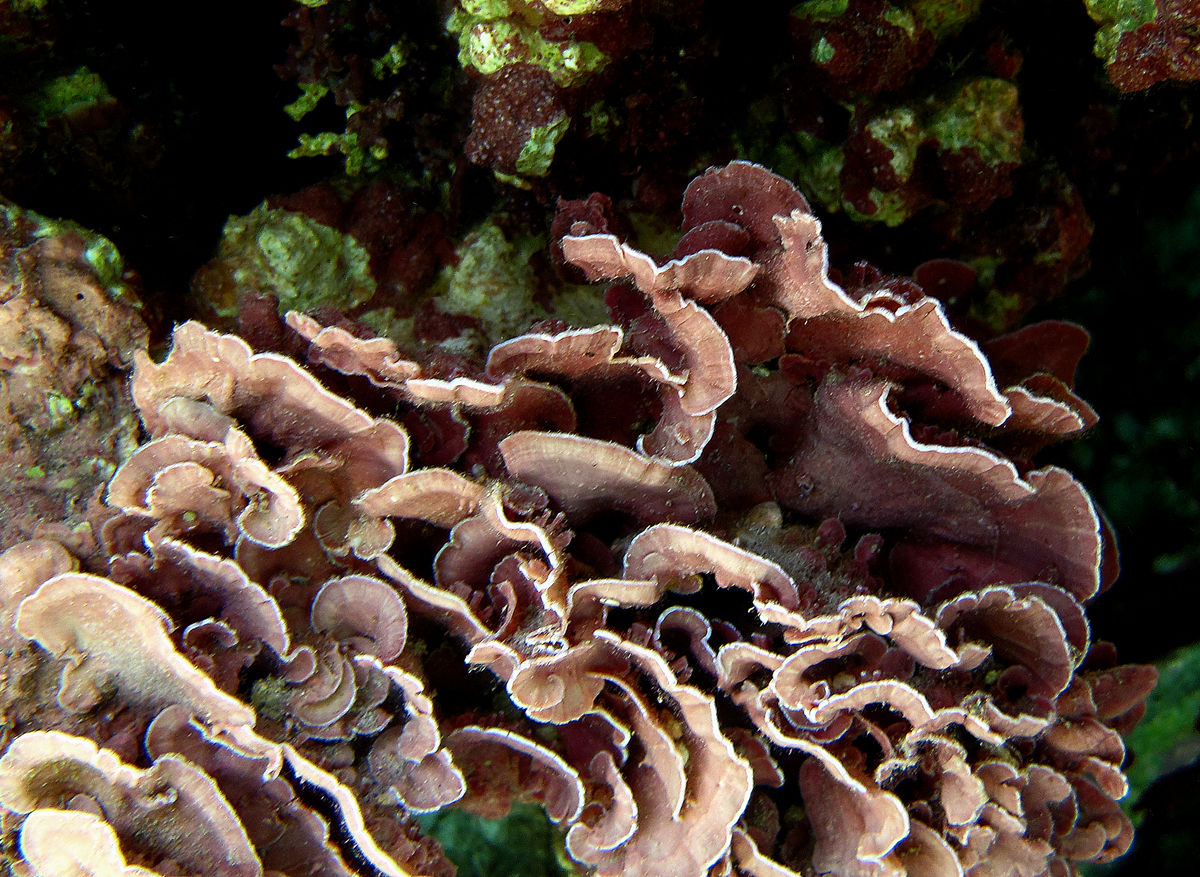
Mesophyllum sp.

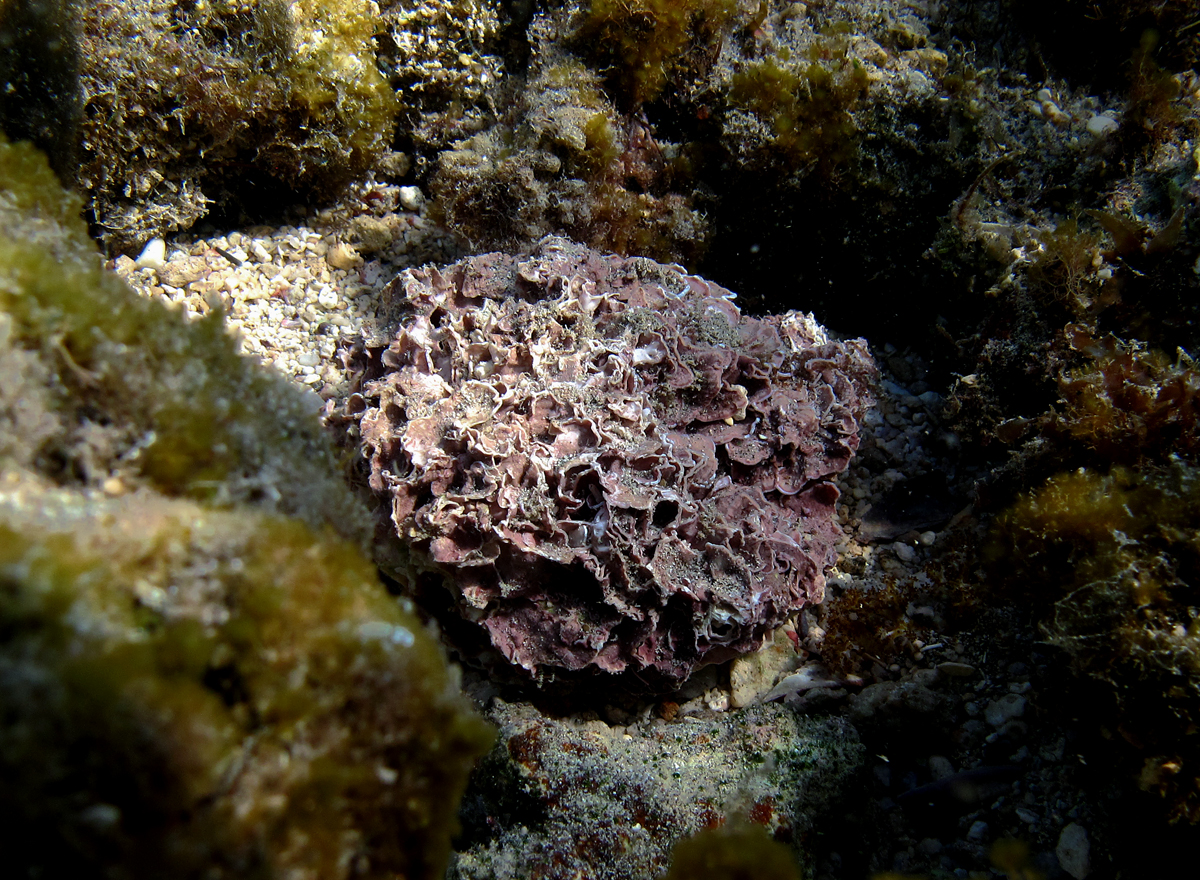
Unidentified encrusting species

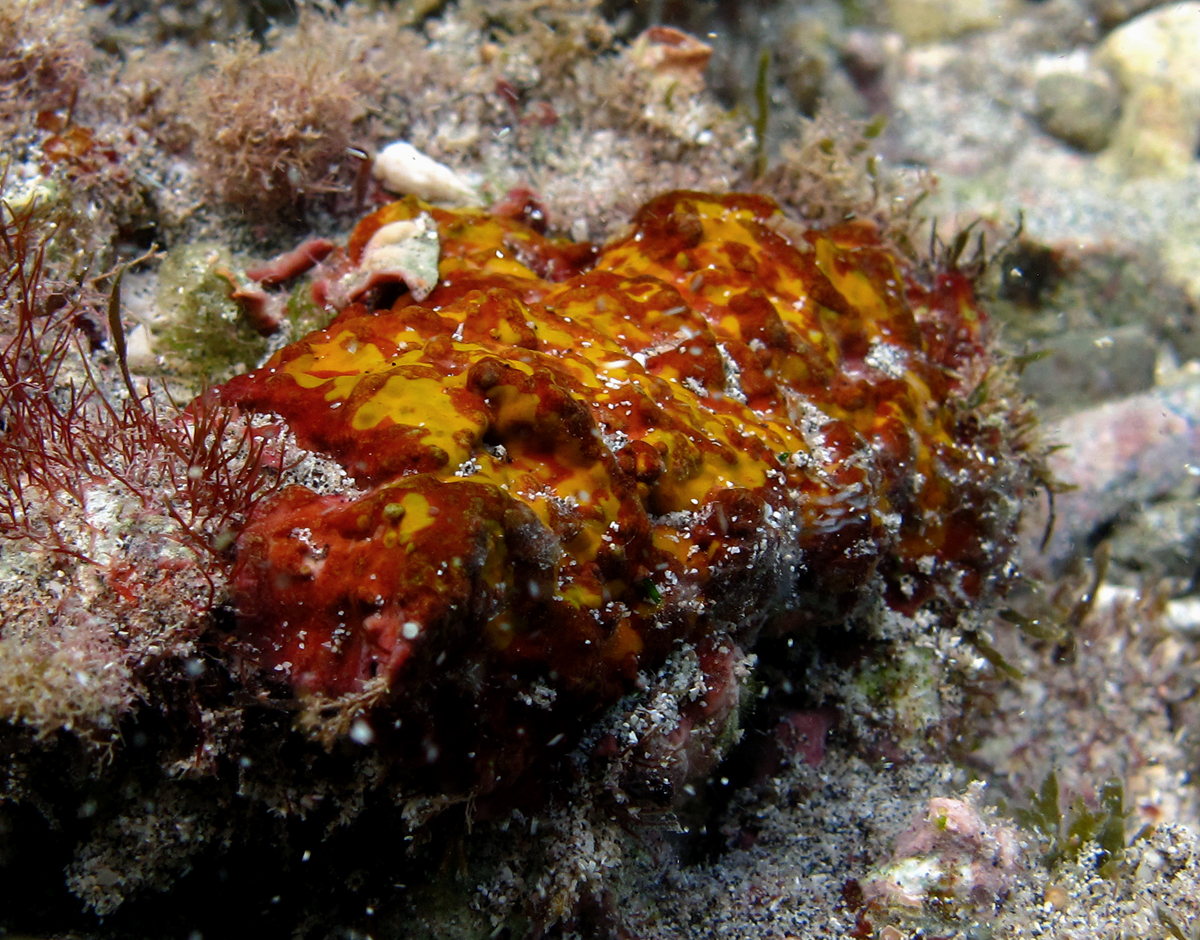
ditto

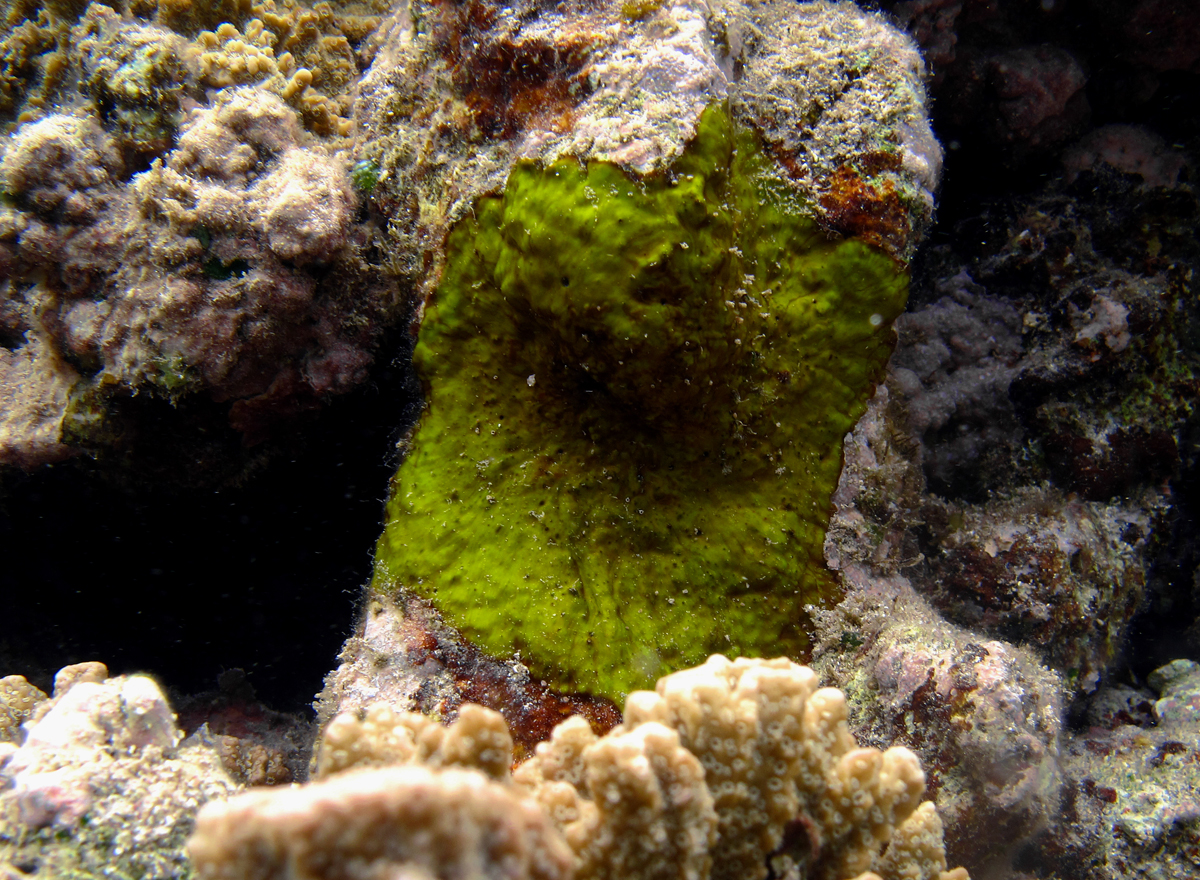
ditto

=== Mineralogy ===
Since coralline algae contain calcium carbonate, they fossilize fairly well. They are particularly significant as stratigraphic markers in petroleum geology. Coralline rock was used as building stone since ancient Greece.

The calcite crystals composing the cell wall are elongated perpendicular to the cell wall. The calcite normally contains magnesium (Mg), with the magnesium content varying as a function of species and water temperature. If the proportion of magnesium is high, the deposited mineral is more soluble in ocean water, particularly in colder waters, making some coralline algae deposits more vulnerable to ocean acidification.

== Evolutionary history ==
The fossil record of corallines matches their molecular history, and is complete and continuous.

Stem group corallines are reported from the Ediacaran Doushantuo formation; later stem-group forms include Arenigiphyllum, Petrophyton, Graticula, and Archaeolithophyllum. The corallines were thought to have evolved from within the Solenoporaceae, a view that has been disputed. True (or crown group) corallines are found in rocks of Jurassic age onwards.

The crown group corallines have an excellent fossil record from the Early Cretaceous onwards, consistent with molecular clocks that show the divergence of the modern taxa beginning around this period. The fossil record of nonarticulated forms is better: the unmineralized geniculae of articulated forms break down quickly, scattering the mineralized portions (disarticulation), which then decay more quickly. This said, non-mineralizing coralline algae are known from the Silurian of Gotland, and the earliest known coralline deposits date from the Ordovician, although modern forms radiated in the Cretaceous.

The Sporolithaceae tend to be more diverse in periods of high ocean temperatures; the opposite is true for the Corallinaceae. The group's diversity has closely tracked the efficiency of grazing herbivores; for instance, the appearance of parrotfish in the Eocene marked a spike in coralline diversity, and the extinction of many delicately branched (and thus predation-prone) forms.

=== Taxonomy ===
The group's internal taxonomy is in a state of flux; for many years, they were included in the order Cryptonemiales as the family Corallinaceae until, in 1986, they were raised to the order Corallinales. Molecular studies are proving more reliable than morphological methods in approximating relationships within the group. Recent advances in morphological classification based on skeletal ultrastructure, however, are promising. Crystal morphology within the calcified cell wall of coralline algae was found to have a high correspondence with molecular studies. These skeletal structures thus provide morphological evidence for molecular relationships within the group.

According to AlgaeBase:

- Family Corallinaceae J.V. Lamouroux — 186 species
- Family Cornutulaceae Korde — 8 species
- Family Epiphytaceae Korde — 119 species
- Family Hydrolithaceae R.A. Townsend & Huisman — 29 species
- Family Katavellaceae Korde — 0 species
- Family Lithophyllaceae Athanasiadis — 286 species
- Family Ludloviaceae Tchuvashov — 0 species
- Family Mastophoraceae R.A. Townsend & Huisman — 24 species
- Family Porolithaceae R.A. Townsend & Huisman — 41 species
- Family Spongitidaceae Kützing — 50 species
- Family Tomentulaceae Korde — 4 species
- Family incertae sedis — 17 species

According to the World Register of Marine Species:

- Suborder Corallineae
- Suborder Mesophyllineae
- Family Hydrolithaceae J.E.Gray
- Family Mastophoraceae E. Verheij, 1993
- Family Porolithaceae Lamouroux, 1812
- Family incertae sedis

According to ITIS:

- Family Corallinaceae J.V.Lamouroux

== Habitat ==
Coralline algae are widespread in all of the world's oceans, where they often cover close to 100% of rocky substrata. Corallines live in varying depths of water, ranging from intertidal zones where they are periodically exposed to air to 270 metres (890 ft) water depth (near the maximum penetration of sunlight in water, within the twilight zone). Some species can tolerate brackish or hypersaline waters, and only one strictly freshwater coralline species exists; Pneophyllum cetinaensis, whose ancestor lived in brackish water, and was already adapted to osmotic stress and rapid changes in water salinity and temperature. (Some species of the morphologically similar, but non-calcifying, Hildenbrandia, however, can survive in freshwater.) A wide range of turbidities and nutrient concentrations can be tolerated.

== Biology ==
Fresh surfaces are generally colonized by thin crusts of coralline algae, which are replaced by thicker or branched forms during succession over the course of one (in the tropics) to ten (in the Arctic) years. However, the transition from crusts to branched form depends on environmental conditions. Crusts may also become detached and form calcareous nodules known as Rhodoliths. Their growth may be also disrupted by local environmental factors. While coralline algae are present in most hard substrate marine communities in photic depths, they are more common in higher latitudes and in the Mediterranean. Their ability to calcify in low light conditions makes them the some of deepest photosynthetic multicellular organisms in the ocean, having been found as deep as 268 metres (879 ft), and as such a critical base of mesophotic ecological systems.

=== Ecology ===
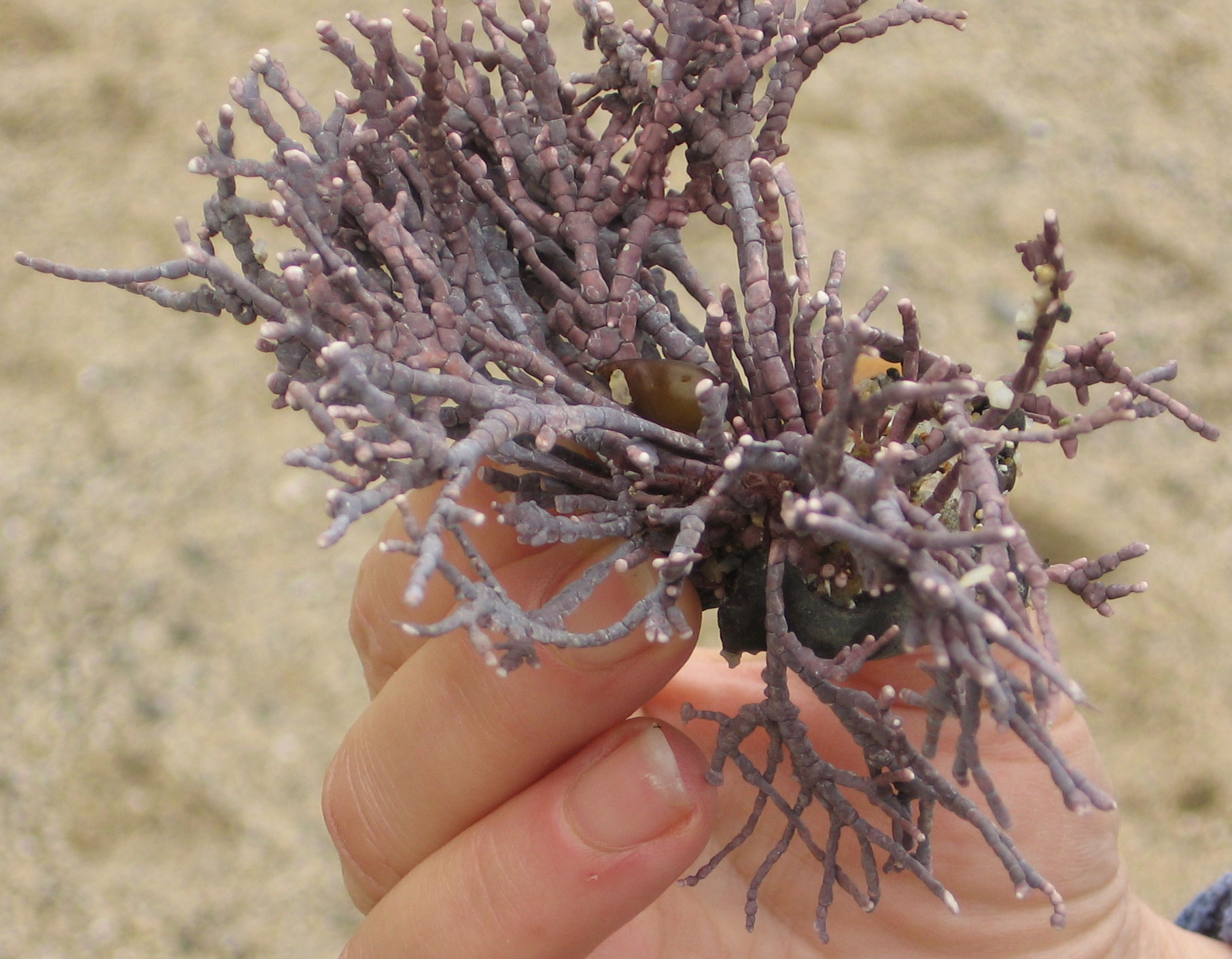
Branched coralline algae washed ashore on the beach of the county park refuge at Moss Beach, California

Many corallines produce chemicals which promote the settlement of the larvae of certain herbivorous invertebrates, particularly abalone. Larval settlement is adaptive for the corallines because the herbivores remove epiphytes which might otherwise smother the crusts and preempt available light. Settlement is also important for abalone aquaculture; corallines appear to enhance larval metamorphosis and the survival of larvae through the critical settlement period. It also has significance at the community level; the presence of herbivores associated with corallines can generate patchiness in the survival of young stages of dominant seaweeds. This has been seen this in eastern Canada, and it is suspected the same phenomenon occurs on Indo-Pacific coral reefs, yet nothing is known about the herbivore enhancement role of Indo-Pacific corallines, or whether this phenomenon is important in coral reef communities.

Some coralline algae develop into thick crusts which provide microhabitat for many invertebrates. For example, off eastern Canada, Morton found juvenile sea urchins, chitons, and limpets suffer nearly 100% mortality due to fish predation unless they are protected by knobby and undercut coralline algae. This is probably an important factor affecting the distribution and grazing effects of herbivores within marine communities. Nothing is known about the microhabitat role of Indo-Pacific corallines. However, the most common species in the region, Hydrolithon onkodes, often forms an intimate relationship with the chiton Cryptoplax larvaeformis. The chiton lives in burrows it makes in H. onkodes plants, and comes out at night to graze on the surface of the coralline. This combination of grazing and burrowing results in a peculiar growth form (called "castles") in H. onkodes, in which the coralline produces nearly vertical, irregularly curved lamellae. Coralline algae are part of the diet of shingle urchins (Colobocentrotus atratus).

Nongeniculate corallines are of particular significance in the ecology of coral reefs, where they add calcareous material to the structure of the reef, help cement the reef together, and are important sources of primary production. Coralline algae are especially important in reef construction, as they lay down calcium carbonate as calcite. Although they contribute considerable bulk to the calcium carbonate structure of coral reefs, their more important role in most areas of the reef, is in acting as the cement which binds the reef materials into a sturdy structure.

Corallines are particularly important in constructing the algal ridge's reef framework for surf-pounded reefs in both the Atlantic and Indo-Pacific regions. Algal ridges are carbonate frameworks constructed mainly by nongeniculate coralline algae (after Adey, 1978). They require high and persistent wave action to form, so develop best on windward reefs with little or no seasonal change in wind direction. Algal ridges are one of the main reef structures that prevent oceanic waves from striking adjacent coastlines, helping to prevent coastal erosion.

=== Sloughing ===
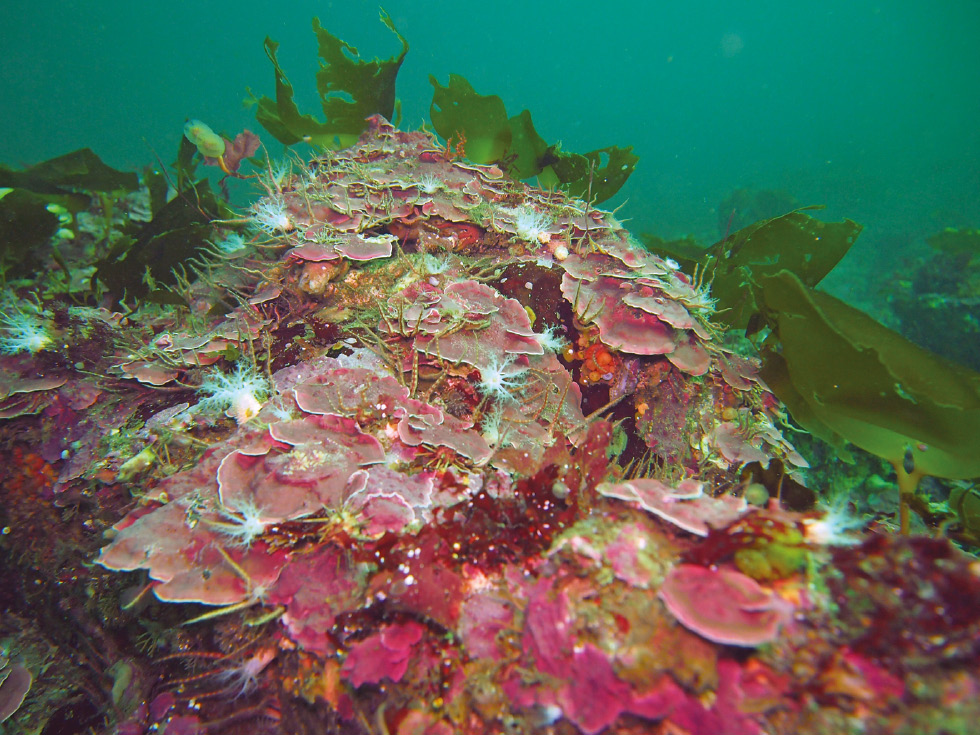
Coralline algae about 20 metres (66 ft) deep at the lower limit of a kelp forest

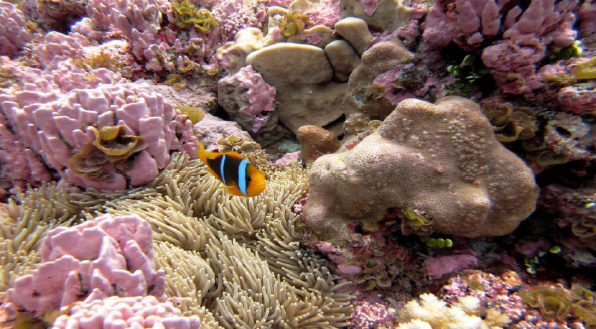
Pink coralline algae at Rose Atoll in American Samoa.

As sessile encrusting organisms, the corallines are prone to being overgrown by other "fouling" algae. The group have many defences to such immuration, most of which depend on waves disturbing their thalli. However, the most relied-upon method involves waiting for herbivores to devour the potential encrusters. This places them in the unusual position of requiring herbivory, rather than benefiting from its avoidance. Many species periodically slough their surface epithallus – and anything attached to it, which in a few cases may be an antifouling mechanism serving the same function as enhancing herbivore recruitment. This also affects the community, as many algae recruit on the surface of a sloughing coralline, and are then lost with the surface layer of cells. This can also generate patchiness within the community. The common Indo-Pacific corallines, Neogoniolithon fosliei and Sporolithon ptychoides, slough epithallial cells in continuous sheets which often lie on the surface of the plants.

Not all sloughing serves an antifouling function. Epithallial shedding in most corallines is probably simply a means of getting rid of damaged cells whose metabolic function has become impaired. Morton and his students studied sloughing in the South African intertidal coralline alga, Spongites yendoi, a species which sloughs up to 50% of its thickness twice a year. This deep-layer sloughing, which is energetically costly, does not affect seaweed recruitment when herbivores are removed. The surface of these plants is usually kept clean by herbivores, particularly the pear limpet, Patella cochlear. Sloughing in this case is probably a means of eliminating old reproductive structures and grazer-damaged surface cells, and reducing the likelihood of surface penetration by burrowing organisms.

== Relation to humans ==
The first coralline alga recognized as a living organism was probably Corallina in the 1st century AD. In 1837, Rodolfo Amando Philippi recognized coralline algae were not animals, and he proposed the two generic names Lithophyllum and Lithothamnion as Lithothamnium.

=== Economic importance ===
Because of their calcified structure, coralline algae have a number of economic uses.

Harvesting of maërl beds off the coast of Brazil occurs. These beds, spanning several thousand kilometres, contain as-yet undetermined species belonging to the genera Lithothamnion and Lithophyllum.

=== Soil conditioning ===
The collection of unattached corallines (maërl) for use as soil conditioners dates to the 18th century. This is particularly significant in Britain and France, where more than 300,000 tonnes (300,000 long tons; 330,000 short tons) of Phymatolithon calcareum (Pallas, Adey & McKinnin) and Lithothamnion corallioides are dredged annually.

=== Medicine and food ===
The earliest use of corallines in medicine involved the preparation of a vermifuge from ground geniculate corallines of the genera Corallina and Jania. This use stopped towards the end of the 18th century. Medical science now uses corallines in the preparation of dental implants, where cell fusion provides the matrix for the regeneration of bone tissue.

Maërl is also used as a food additive for cattle and pigs, as well as in the filtration of acidic drinking water.

=== Aquaria ===
As a component of live rock sold in the marine aquarium trade, and a part of reef health, coralline algae are desired in home aquariums for their aesthetic qualities, and ostensible benefit to the tank ecosystem.

== See also ==
- Leptofauchea coralligena
- List of coralline algae species in the British Isles
