= Geniculate (alga) =

A geniculate habit, with reference to the red algae, is one in which the alga branches, tree-like, forming "fronds" that attach to the substrate with a holdfast. Non-calcified "genicula" serve as "knees" or hinges between the calcified intergenicula. The geniculate or non-geniculate form of algae was used to classify them; however either form has been convergently derived many times. The genuculae sometimes contain lignin.

Genucila have probably evolved at least three times, evidenced by the three different modes of their formation.
