= Corallina elegans =

Scientific classification
- Domain: Eukaryota
- Clade: Archaeplastida
- Division: Rhodophyta
- Class: Florideophyceae
- Order: Corallinales
- Family: Corallinaceae
- Genus: Corallina
- Species: C. elegans

Binomial name
- Corallina elegans Kützing 1849

Species of alga

Corallina elegans is a species of red algae in the family Corallinaceae from the Mediterranean Sea and the North Atlantic Ocean.

Another instance of the name, Corallina elegans Lenormand ex Areschoug, 1852 is accepted as Jania rubens var. corniculata (Linnaeus) Yendo, 1905.
