= Rockweed =

Rockweed may refer to:

- Ascophyllum nodosum, a seaweed also known as knotted wrack or Norwegian kelp
- Fucus distichus, found in tide pools in the Northern Hemisphere
- Fucus gardneri, a similar seaweed also known as bladderwrack
- Fucus vesiculosus, a similar seaweed also known as bladderwrack
- Pilea microphylla, a vascular plant native to Florida
- Silvetia, a common brown seaweed of Pacific Ocean rocky seashores
