= Sporolithon ptychoides =

Scientific classification
- Domain: Eukaryota
- Supergroup: Archaeplastida
- Division: Rhodophyta
- Class: Florideophyceae
- Order: Sporolithales
- Family: Sporolithaceae
- Genus: Sporolithon
- Species: S. ptychoides

Binomial name
- Sporolithon ptychoides Heydrich, 1897

Synonyms
- Archaeolithothamnion dimotum Foslie & M.A.Howe, 1906; Sporolithon dimotum (Foslie & M.A.Howe) Yamaguishi-Tomita ex M.J.Wynne, 1986

Species of alga

Anatomy of Sporolithon ptychoides

Sporolithon ptychoides is a species of crustose red seaweed with a hard, calcareous skeleton in the family Corallinaceae. It has a widespread distribution, being present in the Pacific and Indian Oceans, the Mediterranean Sea and the southwestern Atlantic Ocean.

== Description ==
In the southwestern Atlantic off the coast of Brazil, Sporolithon ptychoides forms rhodoliths up to 15 cm (6 in) in diameter. The surface of the rhodolith is crustose in places and knobbly in others. The internal arrangement is monomerous in the crustose portions and radial in the protrusions. The tetrasporangial compartments are grouped together and raised above the surrounding surface, while old, empty compartments become immersed in the thallus; these tend to be aligned in rows. In the southwestern Indian Ocean off the coast of Natal, this species does not form rhodoliths, instead being crustose, with flat or knobbly thallus sometimes loosely and sometimes securely attached to the substrate. The patches are thick and up to 20 cm (8 in) across, with ragged margins and a flaking surface.

== Distribution and habitat ==
Sporolithon ptychoides is the type species of the genus Sporolithon, and the type location is the Red Sea. It has been found in the Mediterranean Sea, the Red Sea, the Indian Ocean and the Pacific Ocean, and more recently has been detected in the Atlantic Ocean off the coast of Brazil. Its typical habitat in Natal is rock pools, surge channels, and exposed rock in the shallow subtidal zone on offshore coral reefs. In Brazil, it was in deeper water.

== Ecology ==
This is one of several species of crustose coralline red algae that form rhodoliths on the seabed in the southwestern Atlantic. Rhodoliths are clumps of calcareous material that resemble corals but are not attached to the substrate. They do not feed on plankton as corals do, but obtain their energy solely through photosynthesis. Six or more species of the algae can be found forming rhodoliths in a relatively small area, and some of these rhodoliths are composed of several species of coralline alga overgrowing each other.
