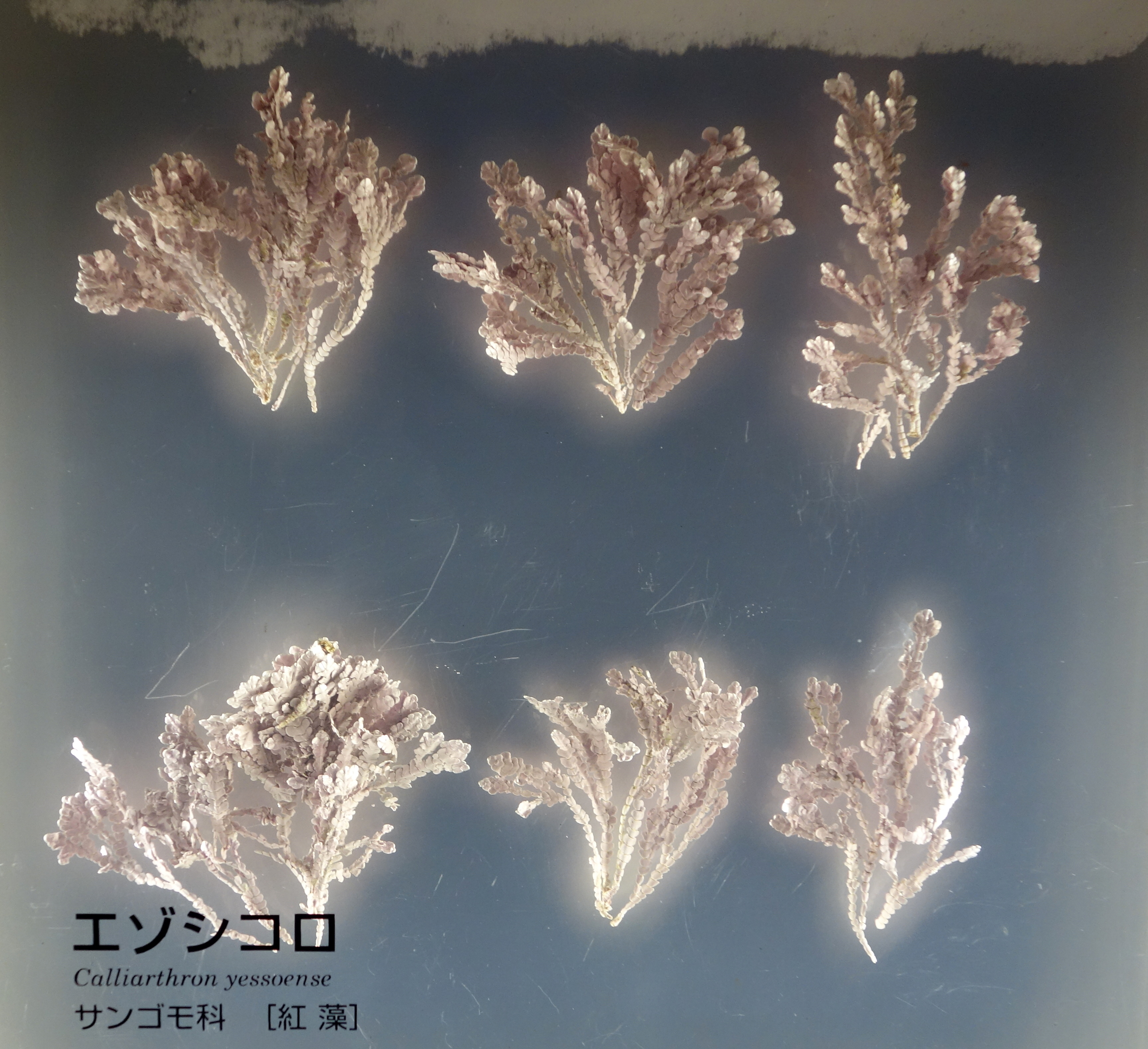
- Calliarthron yessoense, regarded as a synonym of Alatocladia yessoensis

Scientific classification
- Clade: Archaeplastida
- Division: Rhodophyta
- Class: Florideophyceae
- Order: Corallinales
- Family: Corallinaceae
- Subfamily: Corallinoideae (Aresch.) Foslie

Genera
- Alatocladia; Arthrocardia; Bossiella; Calliarthron; Cheilosporum; Chiharaea; Corallina; Haliptilon; Jania; Marginosporum; Masakiella; Serraticardia; Yamadaea

= Corallinoideae =

Subfamily of algae

The Corallinoideae are a subfamily of coralline algae. The majority of genera are geniculate, but some have secondarily re-evolved into non-geniculate (crustose) forms.
