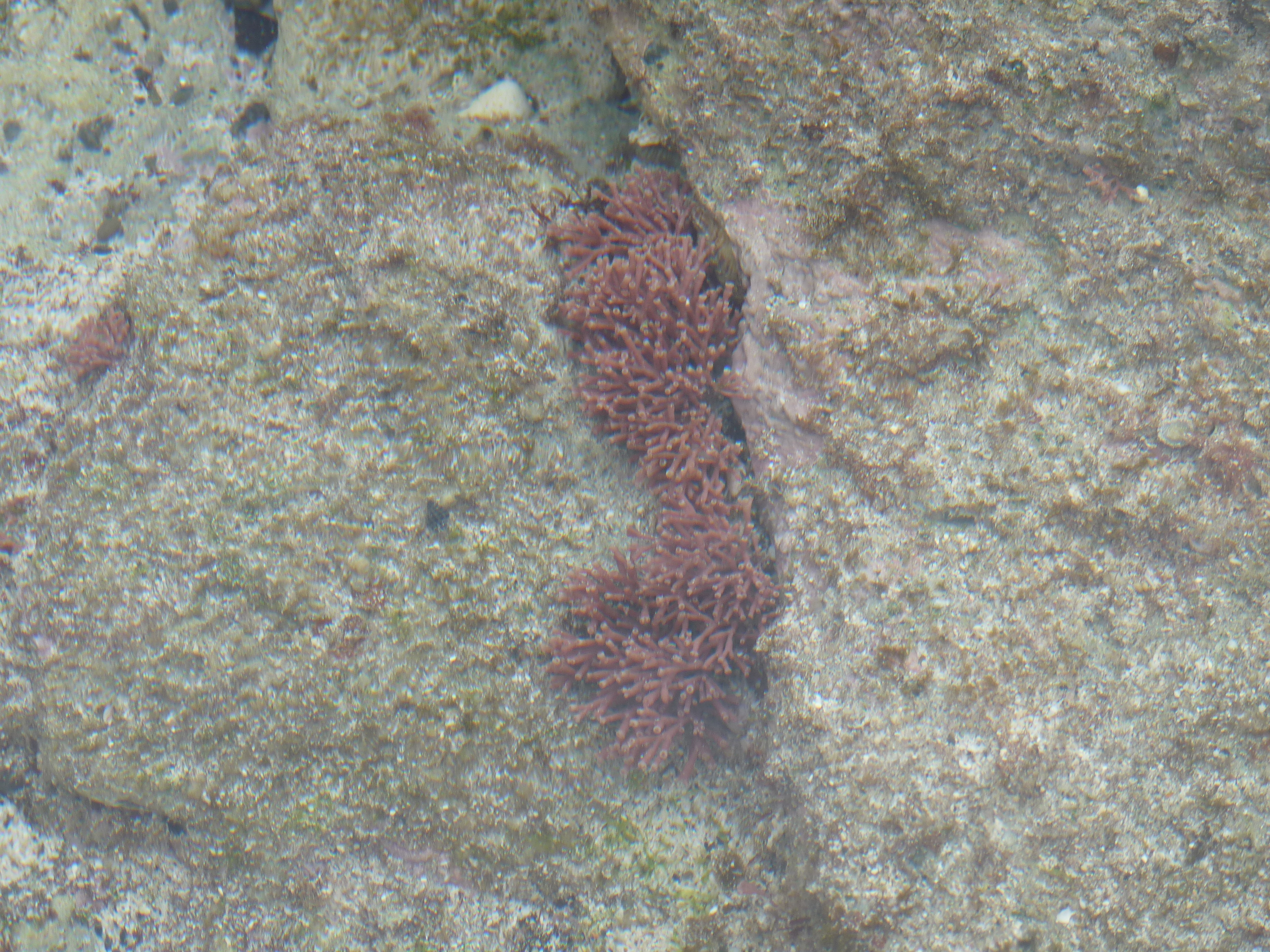

Scientific classification
- Clade: Archaeplastida
- Division: Rhodophyta
- Class: Florideophyceae
- Order: Corallinales
- Family: Corallinaceae
- Genus: Amphiroa
- Species: A. beauvoisii

Binomial name
- Amphiroa beauvoisii J.V.Lamouroux

Synonyms
- see text

= Amphiroa beauvoisii =

Species of thalloid red algae

Amphiroa beauvoisii is a species of thalloid red algae in the Corallinaceae family. It is widely distributed across the world, and can be found attached to rocks in intertidal areas. Individual organisms consist of a base of calcified material, tissue in the shape of branching fan-like planes growing out of it. It exhibits a wide range of morphologies based on where it is found, as well as different reproductive behaviors based on season and location.

== Description ==
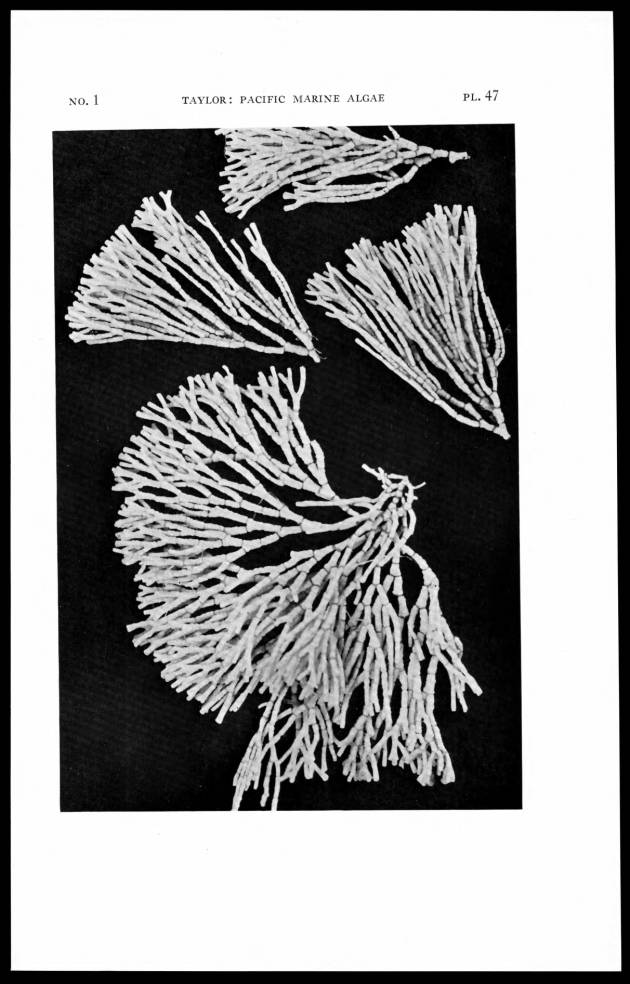
Portions of clumps of A. beauvoisii, under the synonym A. mexicana.

Plants of Amphiroa beauvoisii grow on the surface of rocks, attached on their undersides by a calcified and crustose base. From this base, erect axes grow up to 85 mm (3.3 in) long. The axes are made up of alternating segments of calcified sections called intergenicula and non-calcified sections called genicula. They branch out in a fan-like plane which is about 30 mm (1.2 in) tall, usually split into two distinct branches, but rarely split into three or four.

=== Morphology ===
The branches usually grow from the sections of intergenicula. These intergenicula are usually flat, but can be slightly more circular near the base. They are normally about the same width regardless of where they are on the organism, and measure 3–6.5 mm (0.12–0.26 in) long, 1–3.5 mm (0.039–0.138 in) wide, and 300–400 mm (12–16 in) thick. However, they are sometimes wider towards their ends than at the base. In the core of the organism, there are filaments which consist of one to four arched rows of larger cells which are 45–85 micrometers (μm) long. These rows alternate with a single row of shorter cells which is 6–40 μm long. In the periphery, these filaments are not arranged in rows.

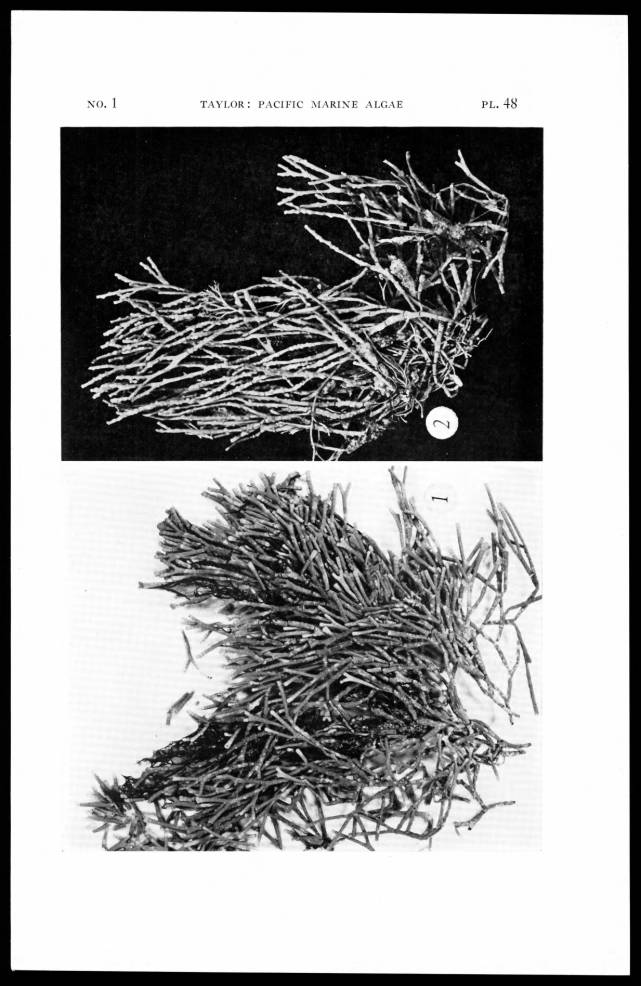
Fig. 1 shows a portion of the branches, without the base, of A. beauvoisii, under the synonym A. peninsularis.

The genicula typically are found where the branches split, or within 2 mm (0.079 in) of the split in the outward direction. The filaments associated with the genicula remain calcified, even though the genicula themselves are not. This leads to these calcified filaments eventually cracking and falling off the organism, though they sometimes leave calcified spurs around the genicula. Mature sections of genicula are made up of at least five rows of thick-walled cells. The transition from genicula to intergenicula occurs within these rows of cells, transitioning from one to the next between layers.

The conceptacles, which contain the reproductive sporangia, are made up of a single pore. They are found scattered across the surface of the periphery of the intergenicula, protruding above the rest of the surface. Each conceptacle is 220–330 μm wide and protrudes 85–140 μm above the surface. They are surrounded by a rick of block-like cells, which sometimes eventually shrink, leading to a moat-like depression around the raised conceptacle. There are several types of sporangia found within the conceptacle. The tetrasporangia are formed around a central column of long sterile cells, and are found in conceptacles with more or less flat floors. They are found in groups of four per conceptacle, separated into their own zones. The carposporangial conceptacles have a warty surface and are more oblong, and the carposporangia themselves have superficial gonimoblast filaments.

=== Cellular characteristics ===
When viewed under a scanning electron microscope, the outlines of cells on the surface of the intergenicula are clear. They consist of calcified ridges 3–9 μm wide which split to form two narrower ridges at the middle lamella. There are concavities 5–14 μm wide on the surface layer of the thallus which are covered in cup-like formations that are calcified, lip-like openings. On the flanks of the apices of the branches there are ridges which surround the apices or make arched lines across the flat side of the compressed branches. These ridges sometimes take the form of simple bands or randomly organized raised cells, while in other places they are made up of complexly overlapping layers of cells. They are harder to see the further away from the point of attachment they are, and on older intergenicula they disappear completely.

=== Similar species ===
Amphiroa beauvoisii is very similar in appearance to several other species in the genus Amphiroa, including A. anceps, A. gracilis, and A. klochkovana. It can be differentiated from A. gracilis and A. klochkovana by its intergenicula, which are almost all compressed or flat, and its genicula, which do not include decalcified cells from the peripheral region. It differs from A. anceps in its pore canals, in that the top of its canals are surrounded by a ring of large cells, while those of A. anceps are not.

== Taxonomy ==
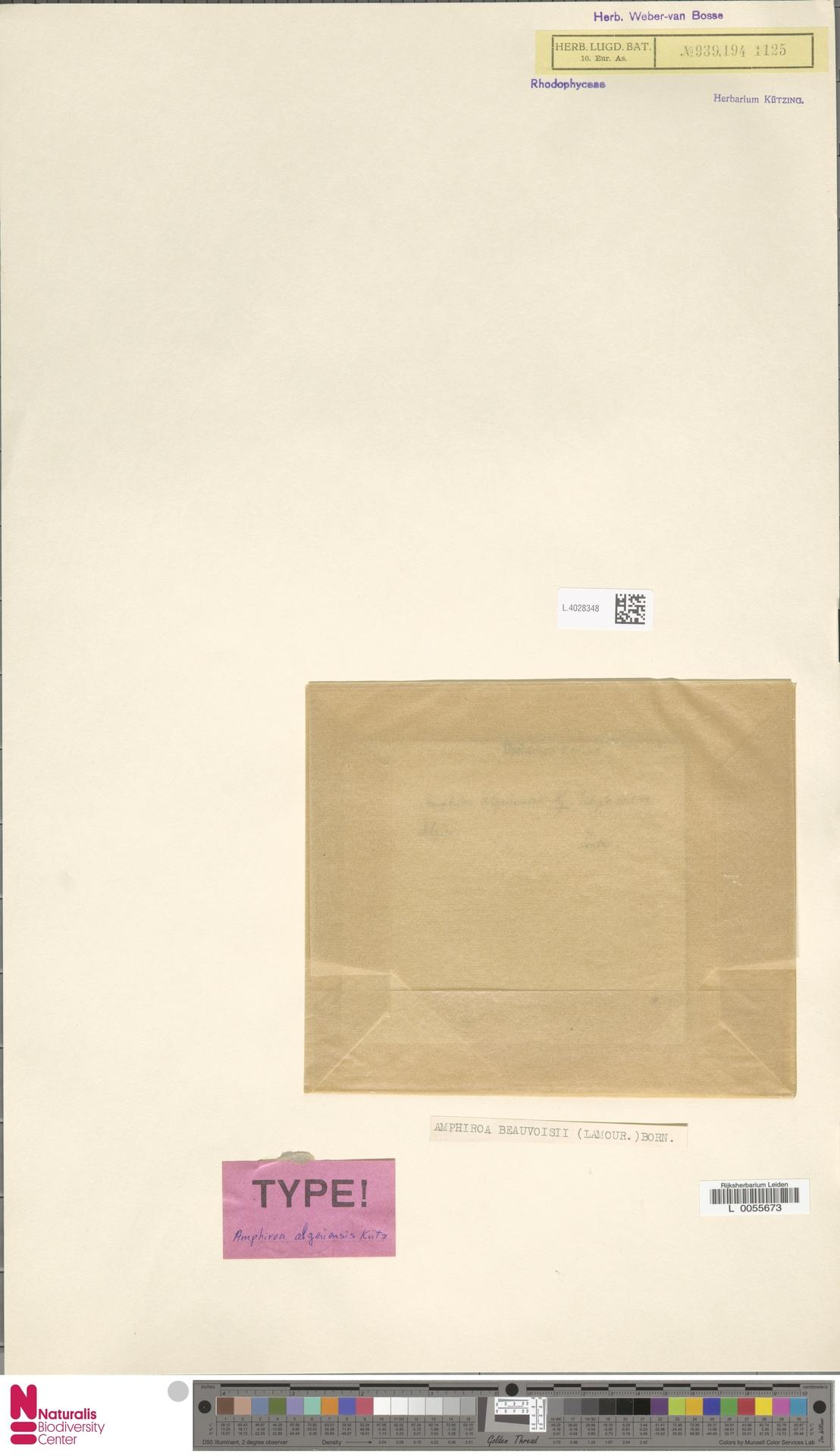
Type specimen of A. beauvoisii at the Naturalis Biodiversity Center

Jean Vincent Lamouroux provided the original description for Amphiroa beauvoisii in 1816, when he described it in his book Histoire des Polypiers Coralligènes Flexibles, Vulgairement Nommés Zoophytes. He gave the specific epithet "beauvoisii" to honor Palisot de Beauvois, an 18th-century French entomologist and biologist.

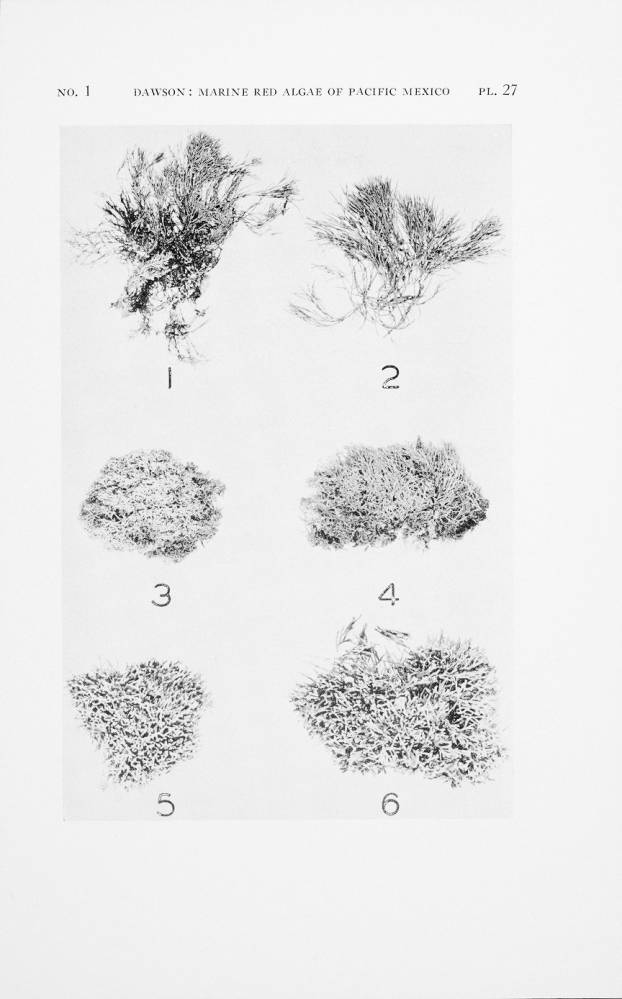
Figs. 5 and 6 show specimens of A. beauvoisii from the type collection under the synonym A. drouetii.

The holotype of the species was collected from a type locality called the "Côtes du Portugal" (the coast of Portugal) by an unknown collector and was donated to the Lamouroux herbarium by de Beauvois, where it remains as of 2013. The holotype specimen consists of part of a single branched axis with calcified intergenicula and uncalcified genicula, as well as eight fragmentary parts of the same specimen, some of which have genicula.

=== Synonymy ===
While Amphiroa beauvoisii does not have any homotypic synonyms, or officially invalid nomenclature, it does have several illegitimate names. Some of these are simply superfluous, while others are misapplied to A. beauvoisii. In 1824, Lamoroux introduced the named Amphiroa belvisii; however, he discussed A. beauvoisii as a synonym in his description, thus making A. belvisii an illegitimate and superfluous name.

Several specimens of A. beauvoisii have been incorrectly described as representing other species of Amphiroa. At several times, it was misidentified as A. anceps, which were included in records of the species as recently as 1993. William Henry Harvey reported A. beauvoisii as occurring in New South Wales, but these reports were based on misidentified specimens which were actually A. ephedraea.

A list of heterotypic synonyms according to Adele Harvey et al. in 2009 is as follows:

- A. algeriensis F.T. Kutzing
- A. annobonnensis R. Pilger
- A. brasiliana F.T. Kutzing
- A. complanata E.Y. Dawson
- A. drouetii F.T. Kutzing
- A. dubia F.T. Kutzing
- A. exilis W.H. Harvey
- A. linearis F.T. Kutzing
- A. mexicana W.R. Taylor
- A. peninsularis W.R. Taylor
- A. polyzona C. Montagne
- A. pustulata G. Martens
- A. zonata K. Yendo

Later studies revealed A. exilis to be a distinct species from A. beauvoisii, with consistent characteristics being observed between the syntype and other Australian specimens of A. exilis. While its own species, A. exilis is still very closely related in appearance to A. beauvoisii.

== Distribution, habitat, and ecology ==
Amphiroa beauvoisii is one of the most widely distributed species in the genus Amphiroa, found primarily in tropical and subtropical climates. It has been recorded from the Mediterranean, the Indian Ocean, the Gulf of California, the Caribbean, and the South African coast. More recently, in 2009, it was found in temperate waters along the southwest, south, and southeast Australian coasts. However, it is possible that some of the individuals collected from the southwest coast were actually misidentified A. anceps specimens.

The habitat of the species is rocky intertidal pools, and it grows on the surface of rocks. It can be found at depths of up to 15 m (49 ft) below the surface of the water.

=== Life cycle ===
Red algae, including A. beauvoisii, exhibit different forms through different generations. This process typically begins as a gametophyte generation, then a sporophyte generation, then a carposporophyte generation which germinates into a tetrasporaphyte. In A. beauvoisii, these different generations will exist in different proportions to one another depending on the geographic location. In subtropical climates, tetrasporangial, bisporangial and gametangial specimens have been found. There are three different proportions found in tropical regions: equal rates of gametangial and sporangial specimens (Pacific Mexico), mostly sporangial specimens (Gulf of California), or only tetrasporangial and bisporangial specimens (Caribbean). In the Australian populations of A. beauvoisii, tetrasporangial forms are common, while gametangial and carposporangial forms have not been recorded.

The size, cover, and frond length of A. beauvoisii varies seasonally. Additionally, the percentage of fronds that are in the tetrasporangial or bisporangial (reproductive) forms also changes based on the season, though this is not based solely on the seasonal temperature, but other factors as well. A population of A. beauvoisii will reproduce and persist both through germinating spores form these reproductive fronds as well as by re-growing the holdfast of the organism.

== Research ==
Amphiroa beauvoisii has been tested for bioactive properties, but showed no activity in antibacterial, antifungal, antiviral, cytotoxic, or antimitotic applications.
