= Cheilosporum cultratum =

Scientific classification
- Clade: Archaeplastida
- Division: Rhodophyta
- Class: Florideophyceae
- Order: Corallinales
- Family: Corallinaceae
- Genus: Cheilosporum
- Species: C. cultratum

Binomial name
- Cheilosporum cultratum (Harvey) Areschoug in J. Agardh 1852

Synonyms
- Cheilosporum elegans

Species of alga

Cheilosporum cultratum is a species of red algae in the family Corallinaceae.
