= Jania rosea =

Scientific classification
- Clade: Archaeplastida
- Division: Rhodophyta
- Class: Florideophyceae
- Order: Corallinales
- Family: Corallinaceae
- Genus: Jania
- Species: J. rosea

Binomial name
- Jania rosea (Lamarck) Decaisne, 1842

Synonyms
- List: Corallina calliptera Kützing, 1849; Corallina clavigera Kützing, 1858; Corallina crispata J.V.Lamouroux, 1816; Corallina cuvieri J.V.Lamouroux, 1816; Corallina cuvieri f. ß crispata (J.V.Lamouroux) Areschoug; Corallina cuvieri var. calliptera (Kützing) Grunow, 1868; Corallina cuvieri var. crispata (Lamouroux) Areschoug, 1852; Corallina cuvieri var. denudata Sonder, 1855; Corallina cuvieri var. turneri (J.V.Lamouroux) Kützing, 1858; Corallina denudata Sonder, 1858; Corallina gracilis J.V.Lamouroux, 1816; Corallina pilifera J.V.Lamouroux, 1816; Corallina plumifera Kützing, 1849; Corallina plumosa Lamarck, 1815; Corallina rosea Lamarck, 1815; Corallina rosea var. crispa Lamarck; Corallina trichocarpa Kützing, 1858; Corallina turneri J.V.Lamouroux, 1816; Cornicularia cuvieri (J.V.Lamouroux) V.J.Chapman & P.G.Parkinson, 1974; Cornicularia gracilis (J.V.Lamouroux) V.J.Chapman & P.G.Parkinson, 1974; Cornicularia pilifera (J.V.Lamouroux) V.J.Chapman & P.G.Parkinson, 1974; Cornicularia rosea (Lamarck) V.J.Chapman & P.G.Parkinson, 1974; Haliptilon crispatum (J.V.Lamouroux) Garbary & H.W.Johansen, 1982; Haliptilon cuvieri (J.V.Lamouroux) H.W.Johansen & P.C.Silva, 1978; Haliptilon gracile (J.V.Lamouroux) H.W.Johansen, 1971; Haliptilon piliferum (J.V.Lamouroux) Garbary & Johansen, 1982; Haliptilon plumiferum (Kützing) Garbary & H.W.Johansen, 1982; Haliptilon roseum (Lamarck) Garbary & H.W.Johansen, 1982; Haliptilon trichocarpa (Kützing) Garbary & Johansen, 1982; Haliptilon turneri (J.V.Lamouroux) Garbary & H.W.Johansen, 1982; Jania compressa J.V.Lamouroux, 1824; Jania crispata (J.V.Lamouroux) Decaisne, 1842; Jania cuvieri (J.V.Lamouroux) Decaisne, 1842; Jania gracilis (J.V.Lamouroux) Montagne, 1845

Species of alga

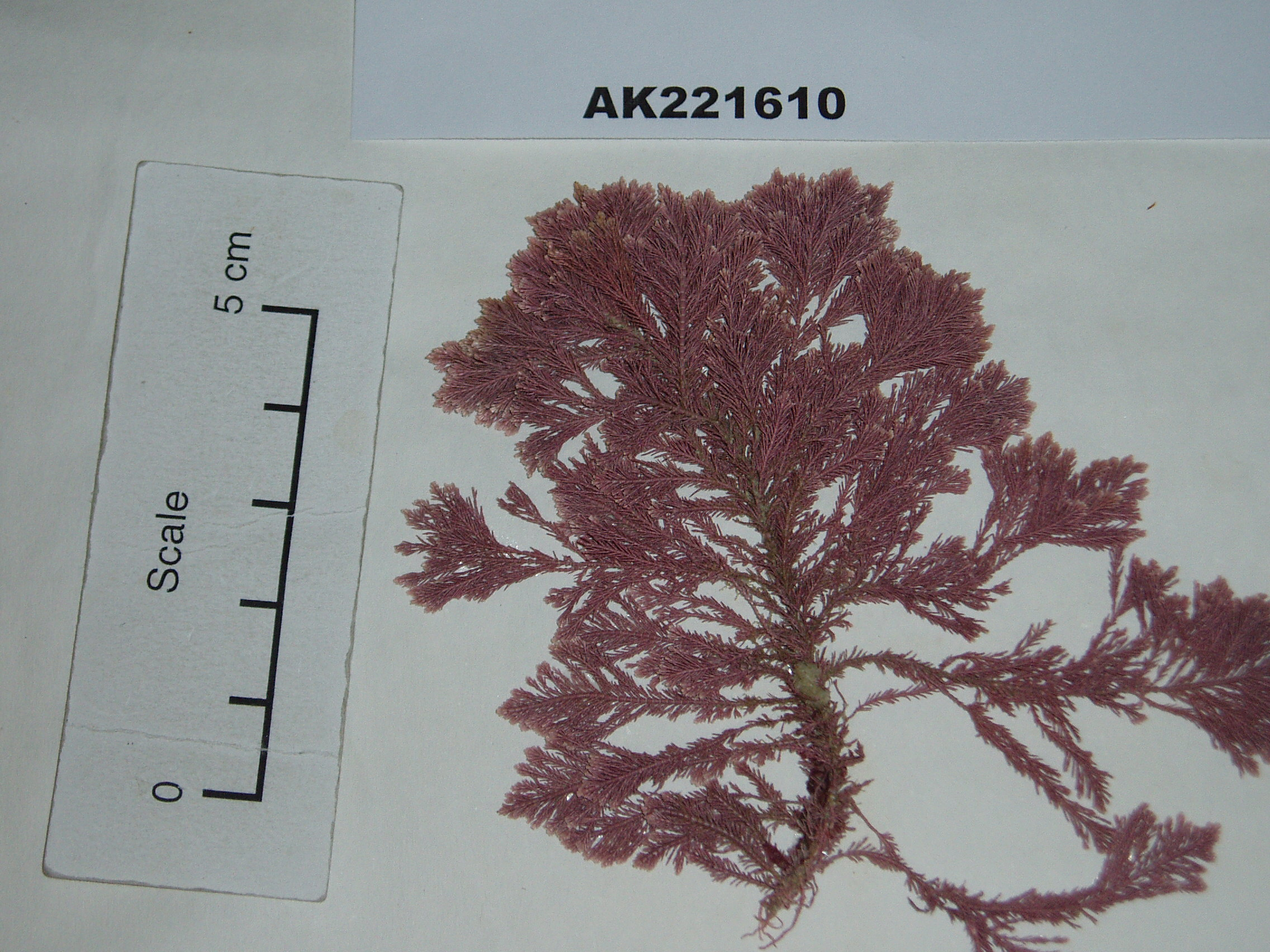

Jania rosea is a species of coralline algae.
