= F. gardneri =

F. gardneri may refer to:

- Fucus gardneri, a seaweed species living on the littoral shore of the Pacific coasts of North America
- Fundulopanchax gardneri, the blue lyretail, steel-blue aphyosemion or Gardner's killi, a killifish species found in Nigeria and Cameroon

== See also ==
- Gardneri
