= Metagoniolithon =

Scientific classification
- Domain: Eukaryota
- Clade: Archaeplastida
- Division: Rhodophyta
- Class: Florideophyceae
- Order: Corallinales
- Family: Corallinaceae
- Subfamily: Metagoniolithoideae
- Genus: Metagoniolithon; Weber-van Bosse, 1904

Genus of algae

Metagoniolithon is a genus of red algae belonging to the family Corallinaceae.

The species of this genus are found in Australia and Southeastern Asia.

== Species ==
Species:

- Metagoniolithon stelligerum Weber-van Bosse
