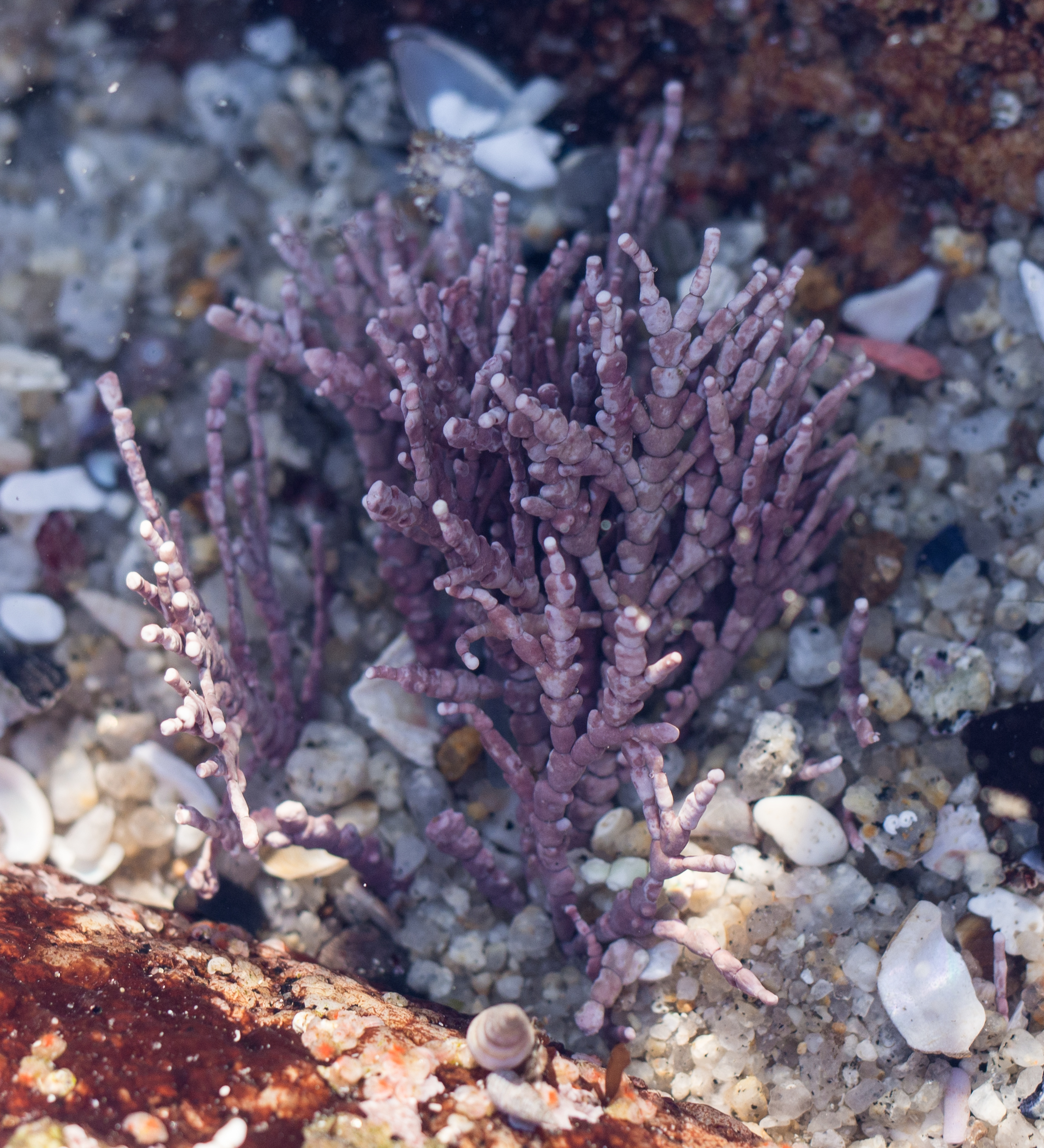

Scientific classification
- Domain: Eukaryota
- Clade: Archaeplastida
- Division: Rhodophyta
- Class: Florideophyceae
- Order: Corallinales
- Family: Corallinaceae
- Genus: Calliarthron
- Species: C. tuberculosum

Binomial name
- Calliarthron tuberculosum (Postels & Ruprecht) E.Y.Dawson

= Calliarthron tuberculosum =

Species of alga

Calliarthron tuberculosum is a species of thaloid intertidal red algae. It is the type species of the genus Calliarthron.

== Taxonomy ==
C. tuberculosum was originally described as Corallina tuberculosa in 1840 Alexander Postels and Franz Ruprecht. It was reclassified into the genus Calliarthron in 1940 by E. Yale Dawson.

== Distribution and habitat ==
Calliarthron tuberculosum is found on the west coast of North America, from the Baja California Peninsula to the Alaska Panhandle. It is commonly found in "low intertidal tidepools in moderate to exposed habitats".

South of Monterey Bay, California, the range of C. tuberculosum overlaps with the range of C. cheilosporioides; as the two species are quite similar, molecular sequencing or detailed measurements are required to distinguish them.
