= Mastophora =

Mastophora may refer to:

- Mastophora (spider), a genus of bolas spiders
- Mastophora (alga), a red alga genus in the subfamily Mastophoroideae
