= Lysvaella =

Scientific classification
- Clade: Archaeplastida
- Kingdom: incertae sedis
- Genus: †Lysvaella

Extinct genus of vascular plants

Lysvaella is a fossil taxon that has been interpreted both as a stem-group corallinaceaen and a vascular plant.
