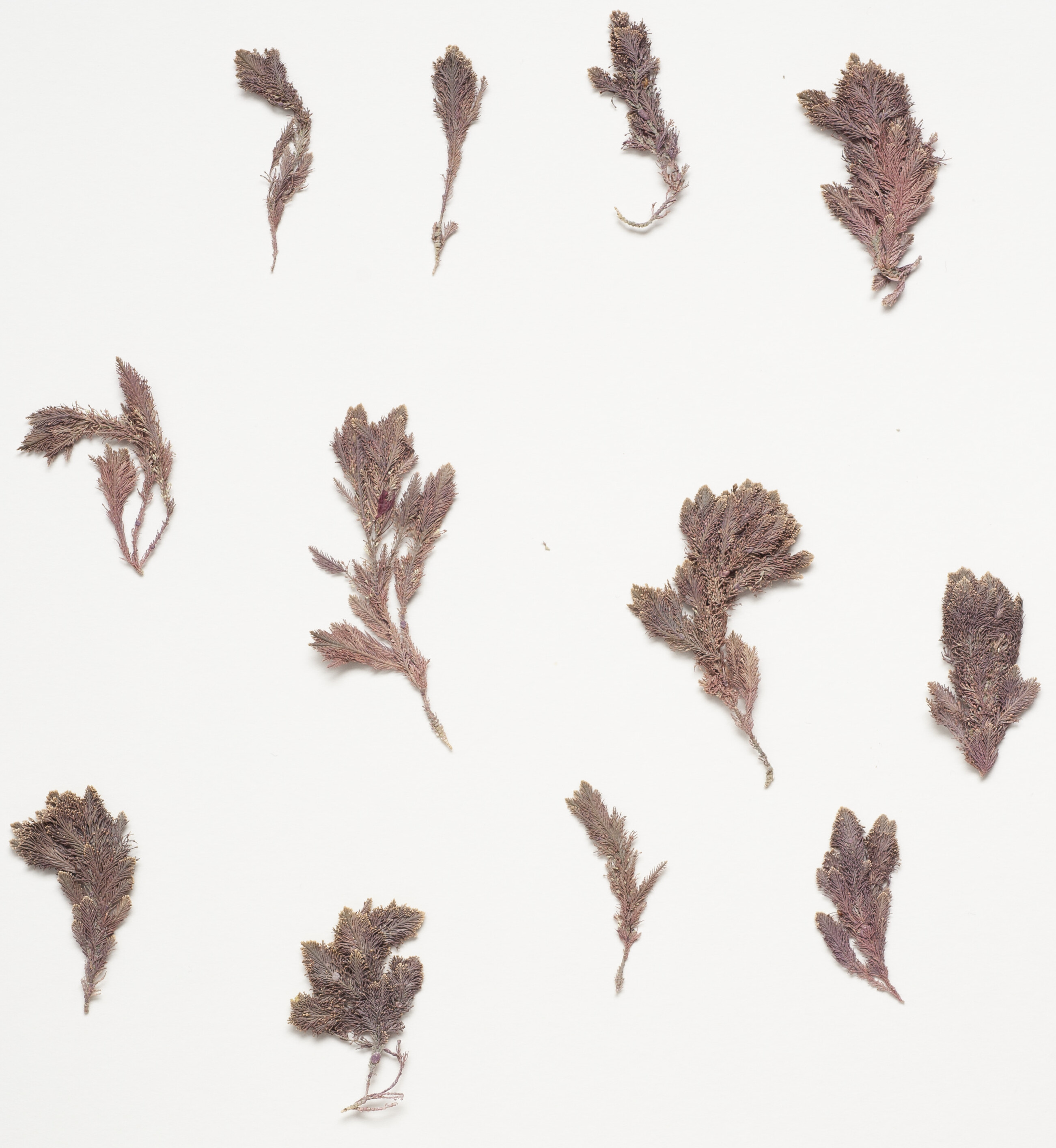
- Type specimen from Te Papa

Scientific classification
- Domain: Eukaryota
- Clade: Archaeplastida
- Division: Rhodophyta
- Class: Florideophyceae
- Order: Corallinales
- Family: Corallinaceae
- Genus: Corallina
- Species: C. hombronii

Binomial name
- Corallina hombronii (Montagne) Montagne ex Kützing, 1849

Synonyms
- Corallina chamberlainiae J.Brodie & R.Mrowicki, 2020; Jania hombronii Montagne, 1845

= Corallina hombronii =

Species of alga

Corallina hombronii is a calcareous red seaweed, found in the oceans of the Southern Hemisphere.

== Taxonomy ==
The species was first described by Camille Montagne in 1845 as Jania hombronii, based on a type specimen collected from the Auckland Islands. The species was transferred to the genus Corallina in 1849 by Friedrich Traugott Kützing. In 2025, Corallina chamberlainiae was synonymised with Corallina hombronii.

== Distribution ==
The species is known to occur in New Zealand, Chile, the Falkland Islands and Tristan da Cunha.
