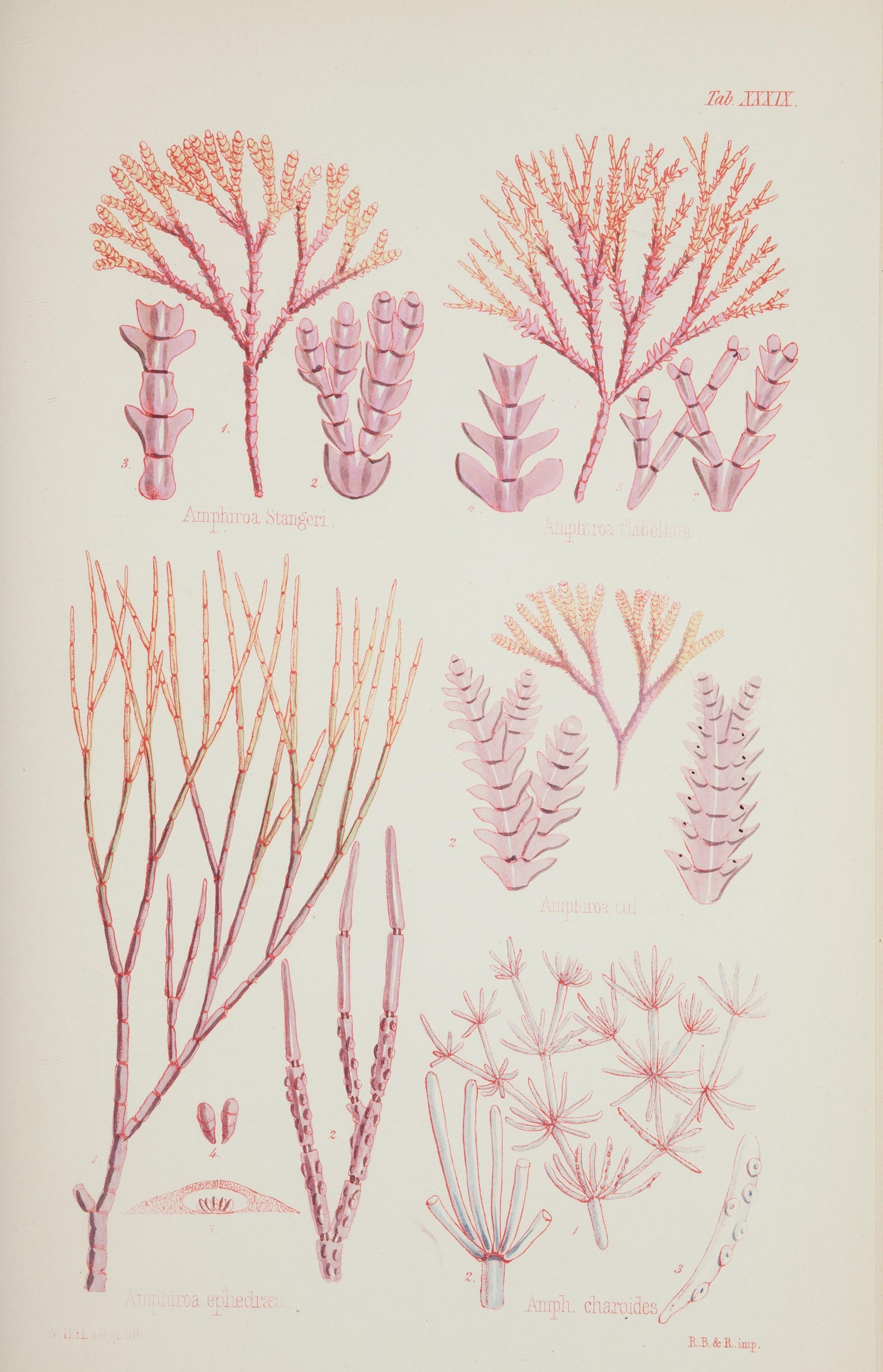
- 2: Amphiroa cultrata

Scientific classification
- Clade: Archaeplastida
- Division: Rhodophyta
- Class: Florideophyceae
- Order: Corallinales
- Family: Corallinaceae
- Genus: Jania
- Species: J. cultrata

Binomial name
- Jania cultrata (Harvey) J.H. Kim 2007

Synonyms
- Amphiroa cultrata Harvey; Cheilosporum elegans Areschoug 1852

= Jania cultrata =

Species of alga

Jania cultrata is a species of red seaweeds with a global tropical distribution.
