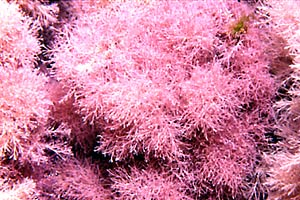

Scientific classification
- Clade: Archaeplastida
- Division: Rhodophyta
- Class: Florideophyceae
- Order: Corallinales
- Family: Corallinaceae
- Genus: Jania
- Species: J. rubens

Binomial name
- Jania rubens (Linnaeus) J.V.Lamouroux 1816

Subspecies
- Jania rubens var. corniculata (Linnaeus) Yendo, 1905 (syn. Corallina corniculata Linnaeus 1758)

Synonyms
- Corallina rubens Linnaeus 1758; Corallina elegans Lenormand; Corallina elegans Lenormand ex Areschoug, 1852 accepted as Jania rubens var. corniculata

= Jania rubens =

Species of alga

Jania rubens, the slender-beaded coral weed, is a species of red seaweeds. It is found in European waters.
