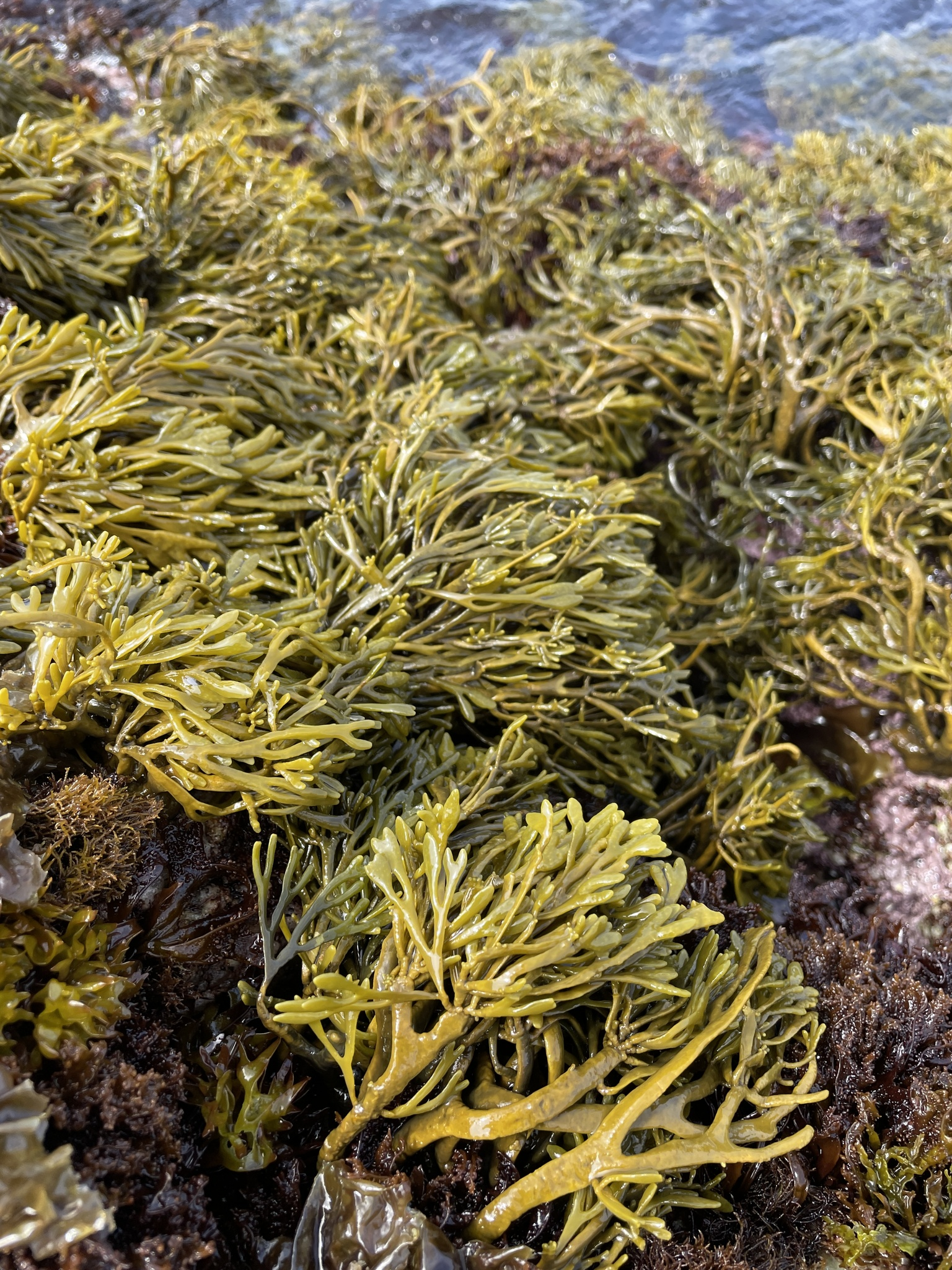
- Golden rockweed (Silvetia compressa) in Pacific Grove, California

Scientific classification
- Domain: Eukaryota
- Clade: Sar
- Clade: Stramenopiles
- Division: Ochrophyta
- Class: Phaeophyceae
- Order: Fucales
- Family: Fucaceae
- Genus: Silvetia
- Species: S. compressa

Binomial name
- Silvetia compressa (J.Agardh) E.Serrão, T.O.Cho, S.M.Boo & Brawley

= Silvetia compressa =

Species of brown algae

Silvetia compressa, commonly called golden rockweed, is a species of brown algae that is a foundational species, making the mid to upper intertidal zone of the California coast habitable to a variety of marine life.

== Description ==
Golden rockweed is a clump-forming species of brown algae that roots onto rocks using a thick, conical holdfast. Each clump consists of golden-brown to olive green, thick, leathery fronds that bifurcate every 3–5 cm. A typical adult length is 30 cm from holdfast to frond tips, but in ideal habitat, some individuals can reach 90 cm. The blades lack a midrib and are flattened, not gas-filled, unlike some other brown algae species, hence the species name compressa. Individuals of this species can occur as isolated clumps (especially in declining populations), but they often form thick mats with other individuals.

Golden rockweed looks similar to dwarf rockweed, Pelvetiopsis limitata, but golden rockweed is taller with a longer stipe and grows higher up the shoreline.

== Range ==
Golden rockweed occurs in the Eastern Pacific, ranging from Northern California (Humboldt County) to Mexico (Punta Baja, Baja California). It is found on the continental coast as well as on coastal islands in this range. It is most common in Southern California.

== Habitat ==
S. compressa grows on rocks in the upper to mid intertidal in more protected areas.

== Ecology ==
S. compressa is a common species. When found on the same shore, it occurs below Hesperophycus californicus seaweed. Mature golden rockweed forms a dense canopy of seaweed blades that slows water, provides shade, and retains moisture. Because it profoundly alters the environment around it, making it hospitable for many species, golden rockweed is considered a foundational or keystone species in the intertidal, just as forest-forming kelp is farther offshore.

Many seaweeds, 45 species observed in a study in southern California, thrive in the subcanopy created by golden rockweed, most commonly Chamberlainium tumidum, Corallina berteroi, Corallina vancouveriensis, and Pseudolithoderma nigrum. Common animal denizens of the golden rockweed subcanopy observed in the same study include sandcastle worms (Phragmatopoma californica), California mussels (Mytilus californianus), aggregating anemones (Anthopleura elegantissima), Hartweg's chiton Cyanoplax hartwegii, Littorina scutulata periwinkles, and limpets of the Lottia scabra/Lottia conus species complex. In addition to the subcanopy life, Spongonema tomentosum grows as an epiphyte. Golden rockweed is a food source for grazers including Tegula funebralis. The local disappearance of golden rockweed can cause cascading ecosystem effects leading to declines of numerous animal and algae species.

== Reproduction and life cycle ==
Golden rockweed is a perennial species; although young individuals are vulnerable, mortality decreases over the first year of life. Adults can live for eight years. Although many species of marine algae display complicated reproductive strategies, this rockweed species uses diplontic sexual reproduction (similar to reproduction typical in animals, where a diploid individual creates haploid gametes, which after fertilization grow into a new diploid, reproductive individual). They are monoecious, meaning that sperm and eggs are produced by the same individuals, in this case, at the ends of fertile fronds. Gametes are released into the water during calm conditions occurring during low tide. These gametes do not move far; after fertilization, large propagules form and immediately settle out of the water and stick to any available surface, meaning that most offspring are found within 1 m of their parent.

Other members of order Fucales can disperse long-distance when fertile reproductive fronds break off and spawn gametes far from the rest of the parent plant, but has not been observed in this species.

== Threats ==
As a slow-growing, slow-reproducing species with a low dispersal capacity, golden rockweed is particularly threatened by abrupt changes in its environment. Buoyant pollutants are often deposited thickly in the mid to upper intertidal shoreline where golden rockweed lives, meaning that oil spills cause extensive damage and mass die-offs, from which recovery is slow and not guaranteed. Golden rockweed is also affected by damage from trampling, particularly by humans. Death from desiccation and heat from Santa Ana wind events, which are intensifying due to the effects of climate change, is hypothesized to account for much of the decline of this species in Southern California, as declines are correlated in location and time with strong wind events. Decline has also been observed with increases in sea surface temperature during an El Niño event.

Golden rockweed is in decline throughout its range, with average percent cover at monitored golden rockweed sites steadily decreasing since 2000, an average of 1.77% per year in the California South Coast and 2.03% per year in the California Central Coast. These declines have included the total disappearance of this rockweed from certain sites.

== Restoration efforts ==
Restoration efforts have been the most successful when scientists carefully select and transplant full-grown adult individuals from nearby populations to suitable microhabitats: those sheltered from trampling, desiccation and sunlight, for example, vertical north faces of rocks. As this species cannot reattach itself, scientists have affixed individuals to the restoration plot by chipping out the piece of the rock the holdfast is clutching and gluing this rock to the new site using marine epoxy.

The purpose of transplanting full-sized, fertile adults is to create microhabitats suitable for the survival and recruitment of their young, restoring beds of golden rockweed in the long-term. While success is variable, one restoration plot in Little Corona del Mar Beach in Newport Beach, California increased from fewer than 70 adults planted in 2010 to over 1000 mature individuals in 2022.

The development of further restoration techniques (such as lab cultivation) could address the limitation of needing a nearby healthy donor population to collect adults from. Seeding without site preparation not been successful, but experiments on increasing offspring recruitment during transplantation of adults by giving them a head start (with an artificial sheltered microhabitat consisting of a sponge drilled onto the rock) was trialed on Santa Cruz Island in 2024.

== Taxonomy ==
Silvetia compressa contains the following subspecies:

- Silvetia compressa compressa: the mainland subspecies. This subspecies typically has thicker fronds, although the thinner-frond variety previously called Pelvetia fastigiata f. gracilis found in the vicinity of Monterey is also found to genetically belong to this subspecies.
- Silvetia compressa deliquescens: the island subspecies has thinner fronds and more branches and is found on the Channel Islands and on islands off the coast of Baja California.

This species has undergone taxonomic revision and has also been called Fucodium compressum, Ascophyllum compressum, Ascophylla compressa, Pelvetia compressa, Fucus compressus, Fucus fastigiatus, Fucodium fastigiatum, Pelvetium fastigiata, and Pelvetia fastigiata f. gracilis. These names are no longer accepted.
