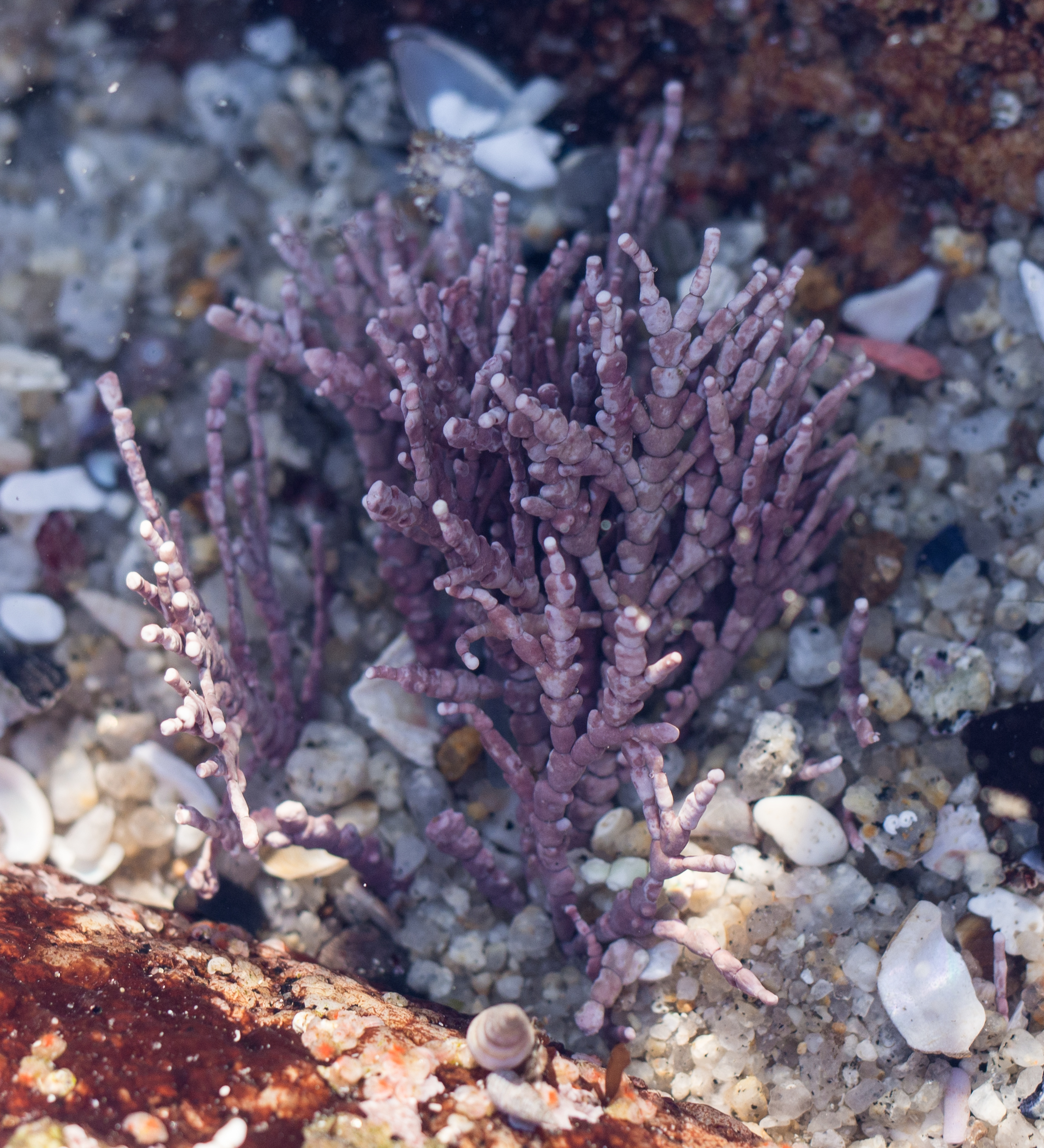
- Calliarthron tuberculosum

Scientific classification
- Domain: Eukaryota
- Clade: Archaeplastida
- Division: Rhodophyta
- Class: Florideophyceae
- Order: Corallinales
- Family: Corallinaceae
- Subfamily: Corallinoideae
- Genus: Calliarthron; Manza, 1937

= Calliarthron =

Genus of red algae in the family Corallinaceae

Calliarthron is a genus containing two species of thalloid intertidal alga. Specimens can reach around 30 cm in size. The thalli take a crustose form. The organisms lack secondary pit connections. Calliarthron reproduces by means of conceptacles; it produces tetraspores, dispores and carpospores. The genus has lignin and contains secondary cell walls, traits which are normally associated with the vascular plants. It is similar to the genus Bossiella.

Calliarthron is calcified, but also has uncalcified joints that allow it to flex in response to the waves to which it is subjected. These joints start out calcified, and decalcify as they grow older. After decalcifying they grow much longer, then fatten themselves up in the same way as xylem formation, resulting in secondary walls.The uncalcified joints, called genicula, separate the calcified segments and allow the fronds to flex when exposed to the waves.

== Species ==
The 2 species currently recognised are:

- Calliarthron tuberculosum
- Calliarthron cheilosporioides
