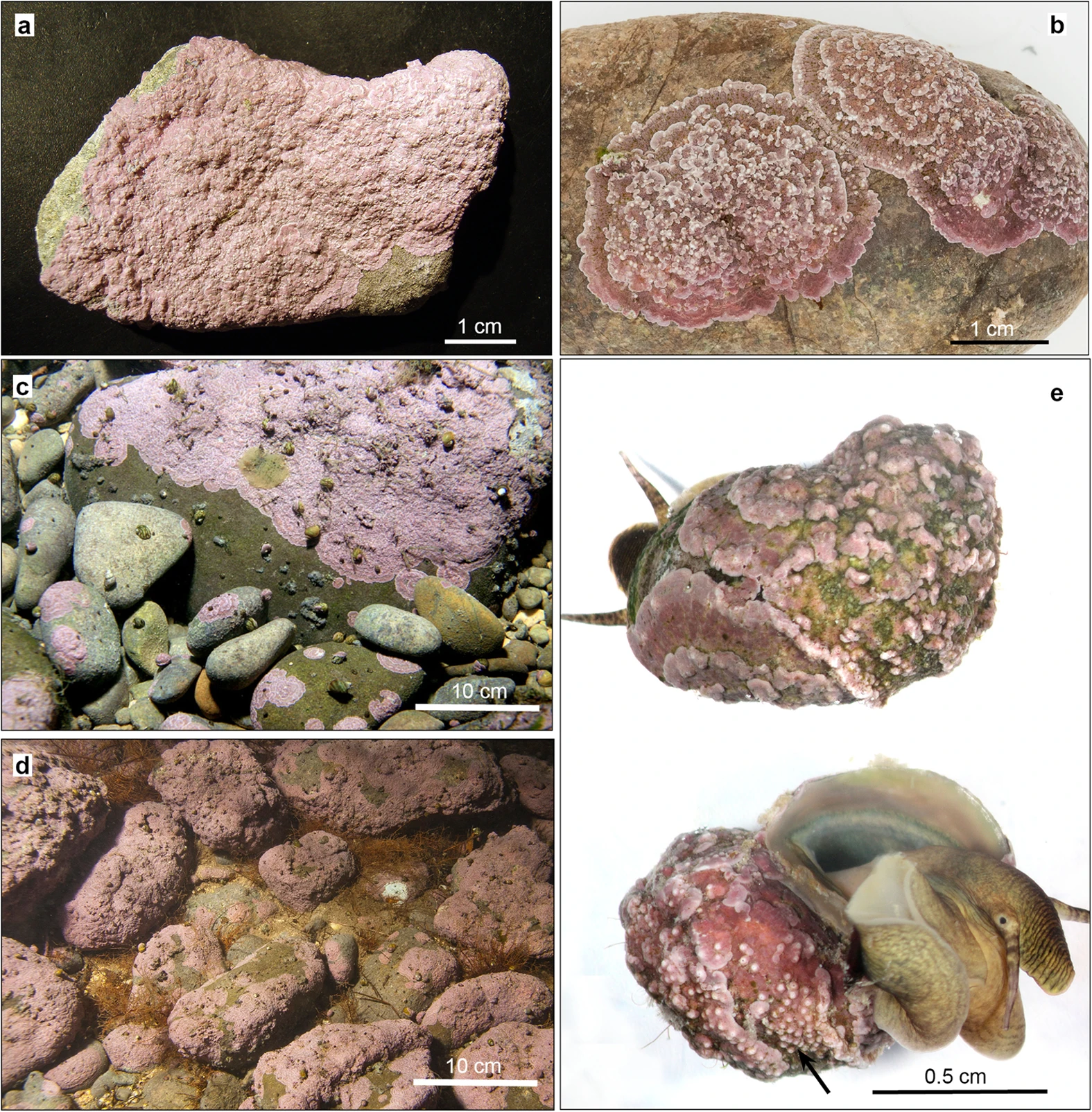

Scientific classification
- Domain: Eukaryota
- Clade: Archaeplastida
- Division: Rhodophyta
- Class: Florideophyceae
- Order: Corallinales
- Family: Corallinaceae
- Genus: Pneophyllum
- Species: P. cetinaensis

Binomial name
- Pneophyllum cetinaensis Silva & Johansen, 1986

= Pneophyllum cetinaensis =

Species of algae

Pneophyllum cetinaensis is the only known species of freshwater coralline algae endemic to Croatia. Its ancestor lived in brackish water, and was already adapted to osmotic stress and rapid changes in water salinity and temperature. P. cetinaensis differs from other coralline red algae species in that it forms extensive and conspicuous crusts thickened with multi-layered flattened or curved branches. It also has a pore canal of simple conceptacles which are not surrounded by specialised cells. It also the only known coralline red algae species which confined to a freshwater stream as opposed to saltwater marine environment. It was first identified in 2016 and was found in the Cetina River.

== Taxonomy and discovery ==
Pneophyllum cetinaensis was described in 2016 by Kaleb, Žuljević, and Peña. It belongs to the order Corallinales and the family Corallinaceae, a group of calcified red algae (Rhodophyta). Its discovery marked the first known instance of a coralline alga adapting to a strictly freshwater environment. The species highlights a rare case of ecological and evolutionary transition from marine to freshwater ecosystems, demonstrating the plasticity of coralline red algae in extreme environmental shifts.

== Morphology ==
The species forms crustose thalli with a multilayered, heavily calcified structure. Morphologically, it resembles marine species of Pneophyllum, but exhibits freshwater-specific traits such as thicker thalli and more robust cell walls. The reproductive structures (conceptacles) are well-developed and contain tetrasporangia, enabling effective asexual reproduction in stable benthic habitats.

== Habitat and distribution ==
P. cetinaensis is endemic to the Cetina River in southern Croatia. It colonizes submerged limestone in fast-flowing, well-oxygenated, calcium-rich freshwater. The river's karstic hydrology and chemical stability are thought to have facilitated this unique marine-to-freshwater transition.

== Physiology and calcification ==
Unlike its marine relatives that use high-magnesium calcite, P. cetinaensis calcifies using low-magnesium calcite. Despite this, its mechanical properties—such as stiffness and elasticity—remain comparable. Its unique biomineralization may be influenced by organic impurities and altered elemental ratios in freshwater conditions.

== Evolutionary significance ==
The existence of Pneophyllum cetinaensis challenges the traditional assumption that coralline algae are strictly marine organisms. Its adaptation to freshwater provides a rare living example of biome transition, offering insights into the evolutionary plasticity of Rhodophyta under extreme environmental pressures. The case suggests that physiological traits such as calcification, once thought to be marine-restricted, can persist in freshwater given the right geochemical conditions. This discovery also raises questions about the evolutionary history and genetic mechanisms enabling such a transition.

== Research and conservation ==
P. cetinaensis represents a unique model for studying biomineralization and ecological adaptation in non-marine settings. Its calcified structure in freshwater suggests novel strategies of ion regulation and metabolic flexibility. Moreover, being endemic to a single karstic river system in Croatia, the species may be vulnerable to pollution, hydrological changes, and climate-related impacts. Conservation efforts and further research are essential to understand its ecological role and to ensure its survival in the face of potential anthropogenic threats.
