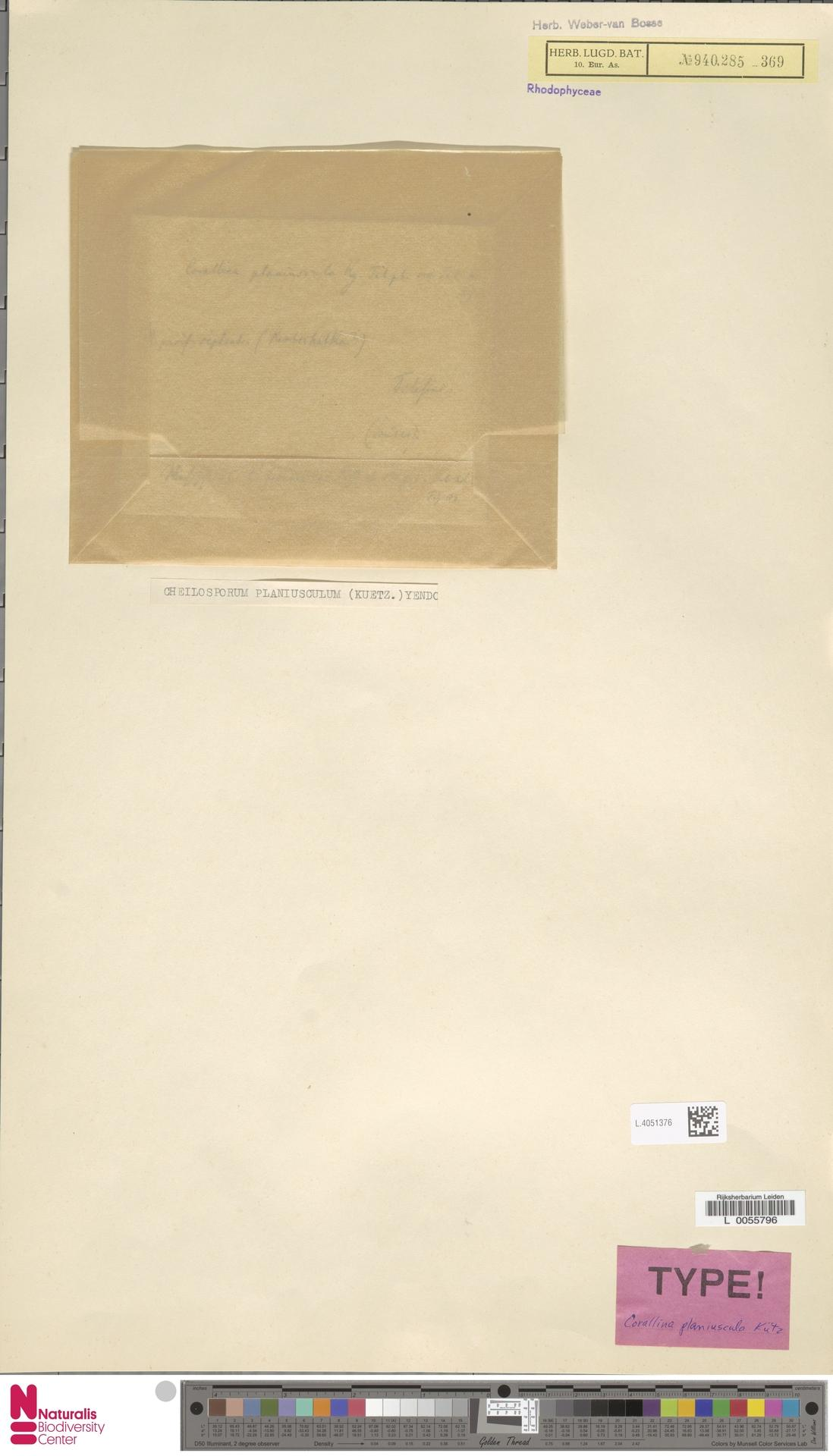
- Corallina planiuscula Kütz. (type of) - Cheilosporum planiusculum (Kütz.) Yendo (species)

Scientific classification
- Clade: Archaeplastida
- Division: Rhodophyta
- Class: Florideophyceae
- Order: Corallinales
- Family: Corallinaceae
- Subfamily: Corallinoideae
- Genus: Cheilosporum (Decaisne) Zanardini 1844

Species
- Cheilosporum acutilobum; Cheilosporum cultratum; Cheilosporum latissimum; Cheilosporum planiusculum (Kütz.) Yendo 1902; Cheilosporum sagittatum

= Cheilosporum =

Genus of algae

Cheilosporum is a genus of red algae in the family Corallinaceae.

The arrow coralline Cheilosporum sagittatum (Lamouroux) Areschoug is a seaweed of temperate waters of Australia (from Perth, Western Australia, to Coffs Harbour, New South Wales, and around Tasmania).

== Species formerly placed in the genus ==
Arthrocardia corymbosa (Lamarck) Decaisne 1842, syn. Cheilosporum corymbosum (Lamarck) Decaisne 1842, is a red alga of South Africa (Southern Cape Peninsula eastward).
