= Mastophoroideae =

Scientific classification
- Clade: Archaeplastida
- Division: Rhodophyta
- Class: Florideophyceae
- Order: Corallinales
- Family: Corallinaceae
- Subfamily: Mastophoroideae

Genera
- Hydrolithon; Lesueuria; Lithoporella; Mastophora; Metamastophora; Neogoniolithon; Pneophyllum; Spongites

Subfamily of algae

The Mastophoroideae are a subfamily of Corallinaceaen coralline algae with uniporate conceptacles.
