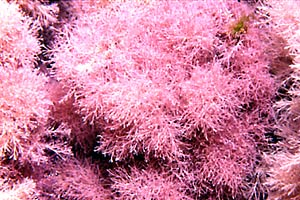
- Jania rubens

Scientific classification
- Domain: Eukaryota
- Clade: Archaeplastida
- Division: Rhodophyta
- Class: Florideophyceae
- Order: Corallinales
- Family: Corallinaceae
- Subfamily: Corallinoideae
- Genus: Jania; J.V. Lamouroux, 1812

Species
- See text

= Jania (alga) =

Genus of algae

Jania is a genus of red macroalgae (or seaweeds) with hard, calcareous, branching skeletons in the family Corallinaceae.

== Taxonomy and Nomenclature ==
The genus name of Jania is derived from the Greek water nymph called Ianeira (or Janeria). It was first circumscribed by Jean Vincent Félix Lamouroux in 1812. Based on a recent integrated taxonomic examination of the genus, and by extension its tribe Janieae, the members of Cheilosporum and Haliptilon have all been transferred under genus Jania. As a result, there is currently around 55 confirmed species for this genus.

== Morphology ==
Jania is an articulated coralline algae characterized by having erect thalli with dichotomously-arranged branches composed of alternating segments of red or pink, calcified, cylindrical sections (intergeniculum) and white uncalcified sections (geniculum); that is attached to the substrate by small, stolon-like holdfasts. Intergenicula of this genus can be cylindrical, subcylindrical or compressed and smooth, winged or lobed.

== Distribution ==
Jania species are well-distributed throughout the world.

== Ecology ==
Members of the genus are found in sheltered reef habitats, often in crevices or other shaded areas. They are also epilithic, epiphytic, and could form free-living clumps called articuliths.

== Life history ==
Like most red seaweeds, Jania exhibit a triphasic life cycle wherein aside from the free-living haploid (gametophyte) and diploid (tetrasporophyte) generations, another diploid generation that is parasitic to the gametophyte, the carposporophyte. Tetrasporophyte (2N) generation would release four haploid spores (or tetraspores) that would later on develop into either the male and female gametophytes; moreover, the spermatium (N) produced by the spermatangia will be trapped by the trichogyne of the carpogonium (N) of the female gametophyte and later on fuse to form the zygote and subsequently develop into the carposporophyte (2N); lastly the carposporophyte will produce carpospores (2N) that will become the tetratsporophyte (2N). The unique structure involved in coralline reproduction is the presence of the conceptacle, a calcified depression wherein the tetrasporangia, spermatangia, and carposporangia are formed.

== Exploitation/harvesting/cultivation ==
There is no known cultivation technology for this genus.

== Chemical composition/natural products chemistry ==
Priming tomato seeds with Jania polysaccharides has shown to greatly improve the resistance of seedlings to soil-borne pathogens and consequently promote plant growth.

== Utilization and management ==
Despite the potential use of Jania in agriculture and due to a lack of interest on this genus, this genus is not currently being commercially utilized.

== Species ==
The World Register of Marine Species list the following:

- Jania acutiloba (Decaisne) J.H. Kim
- Jania adhaerens J.V.Lamouroux, 1816
- Jania affinis Harvey, 1855
- Jania arborescens (Yendo) Yendo, 1905
- Jania articulata N'Yuert & Payri, 2009
- Jania capillacea Harvey, 1853
- Jania crassa J.V.Lamouroux, 1821
- Jania cristata (Linnaeus) Endlicher, 1843
- Jania cubensis Montagne ex Kützing, 1849
- Jania cultrata (Harvey) J.H. Kim
- Jania decussatodichotoma (Yendo) Yendo, 1905
- Jania fastigiata Harvey, 1849
- Jania intermedia (Kützing) P.C.Silva, 1996
- Jania iyengarii E.Ganesan, 1966
- Jania lobata Zanardini, 1858
- Jania longiarthra E.Y.Dawson, 1953
- Jania longifurca Zanardini, 1844
- Jania micrarthrodia J.V.Lamouroux, 1816
- Jania minuta Johansen & Womersley, 1994
- Jania nipponica (Yendo) Yendo, 1905
- Jania novae-zelandiae Harvey, 1855
- Jania pacifica Areschoug, 1852
- Jania parva Johansen & Womersley, 1994
- Jania prolifera A.B. Joly, 1966
- Jania pulchella (Harvey) Johansen & Womersley, 1994
- Jania pumila J.V.Lamouroux, 1816
- Jania pusilla (Sonder) Yendo, 1905
- Jania pygmaea J.V.Lamouroux, 1816
- Jania radiata Yendo, 1905
- Jania rosea (Lamarck) Decaisne, 1842
- Jania rubens (Linnaeus) J.V.Lamouroux, 1816
- Jania rubrens (L.) Lamour
- Jania sagittata (J.V.Lamouroux) Blainville, 1834
- Jania santae-marthae Schnetter
- Jania spectabile (Harvey ex Grunow)
- Jania squamata (Linnaeus) J.H. Kim,
- Jania subpinnata E.Y.Dawson, 1953
- Jania subulata (Ellis & Solander) Sonder, 1848
- Jania tenella (Kützing) Grunow, 1874
- Jania ungulata (Yendo) Yendo, 1905
- Jania verrucosa J.V.Lamouroux, 1816
- Jania yenoshimensis (Yendo) Yendo, 1905
