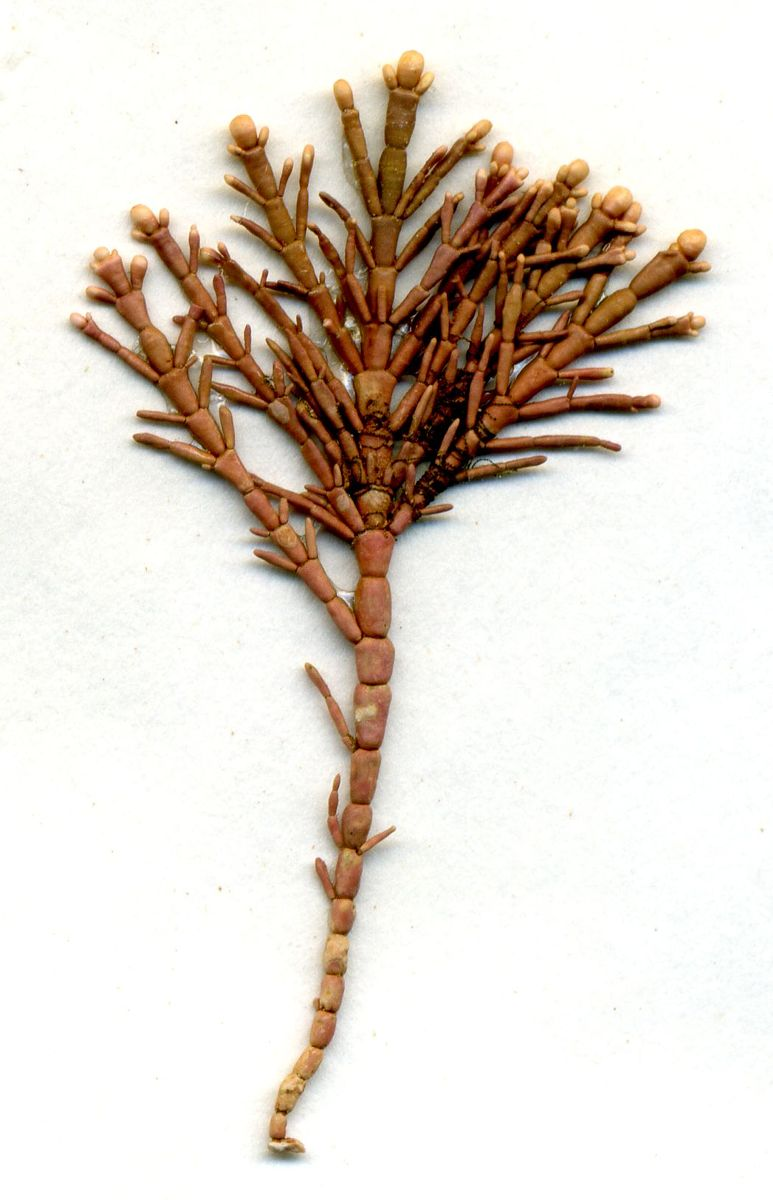
- Corallina officinalis L., herbarium sheet. Collected in Heligoland, Germany

Scientific classification
- Clade: Archaeplastida
- Division: Rhodophyta
- Class: Florideophyceae
- Subclass: Corallinophycidae

= Corallinophycidae =

Subclass of algae

The Corallinophycidae is a grouping of several calcifying red algal lineages recovered by molecular analysis.

== Orders ==
According to AlgaeBase, it contains;

- Order Corallinales P.C.Silva & H.W.Johansen (826 species)
- Order Corallinapetrales S.Y.Jeong, W.A.Nelson, B.Y.Won & T.O.Cho (2)
- Order Corallinophycidae ord. incertae sedis (6)
- Order Rhodogorgonales S.Fredericq, J.N.Norris & C.Pueschel (18)
- Order Sporolithales Le Gall & G.W.Saunders (61)
