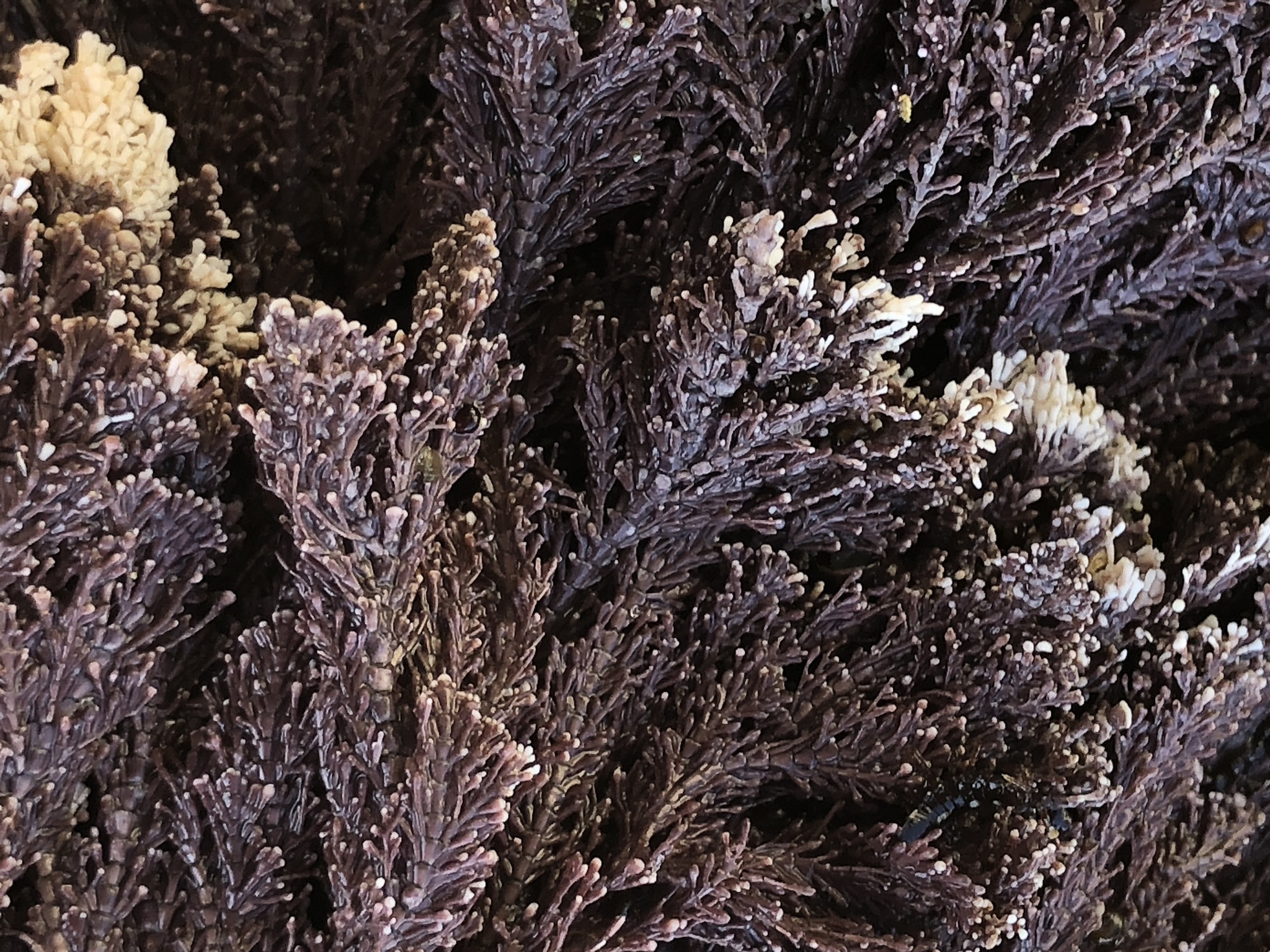

Scientific classification
- Clade: Archaeplastida
- Division: Rhodophyta
- Class: Florideophyceae
- Order: Corallinales
- Family: Corallinaceae
- Genus: Corallina
- Species: C. vancouveriensis

Binomial name
- Corallina vancouveriensis Yendo, 1902

= Corallina vancouveriensis =

Species of red algae

Corallina vancouveriensis (also known as graceful coral seaweed) is a species of red algae found along the west coast of North America.

== Description ==
Corallina vancouveriensis is a branching, calcareous algae that resembles coral. It is light pink to purple in colour, but will bleach white if exposed for long periods of time. Upright pinnate branches emerge from a tightly-packed base.

== Range, habitat and ecology ==
Corallina vancouveriensis is found along the west coast of North America from Mexico to Alaska and through the Aleutian Islands. It is also found in the Galápagos Islands and Japan.

It is found in mid to low intertidal zones and in tidepools. It is able to spread opportunistically to newly-cleared spaces on rocks.

Research has found that sea urchins are attracted to C. vancouveriensis, which aid in protecting the juvenile urchins from predatory crabs.
