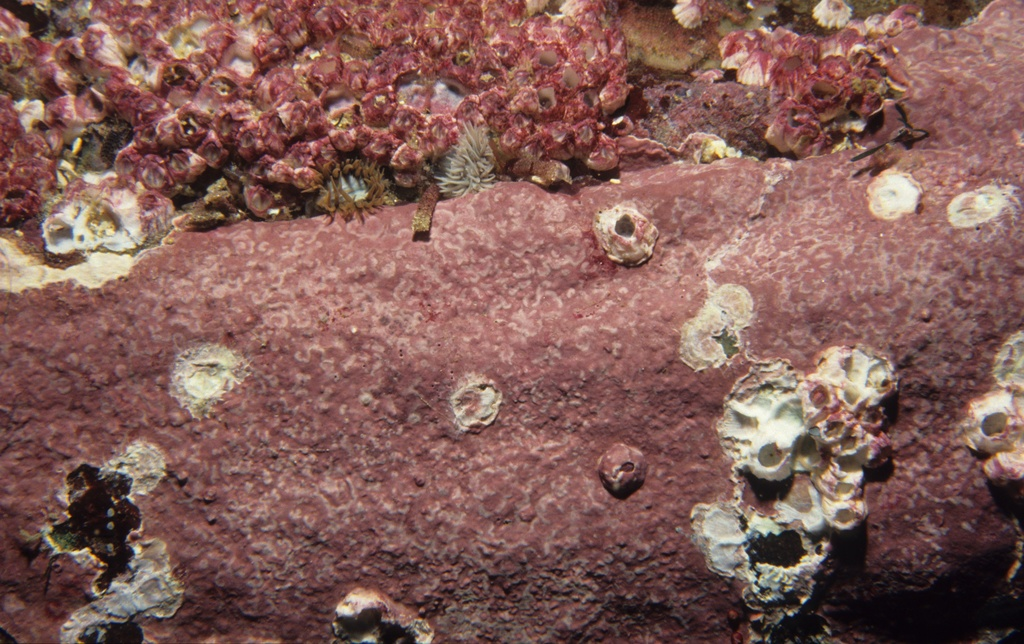

Scientific classification
- Domain: Eukaryota
- Clade: Archaeplastida
- Division: Rhodophyta
- Class: Florideophyceae
- Order: Sporolithales
- Family: Sporolithaceae

= Sporolithaceae =

Sporolithaceae Temporal range: Mesozoic–recent

Family of algae

The Sporolithaceae is the only known family of algae in the Sporolithales order.

Sporolithaceae was originally placed within the Corallinales order, until the creation of the Sporolithales order in 2017.

They are differentiated from the Corallinaceae, by their formation of conceptacles with one or many pores.

Species in the Sporolithales (and also the Sporolithaceae), have the characteristics of the Corallinophycidae, but differs from other orders (Corallinales, Rhodogorgonales) in producing tetrasporangia within calcified sporangial compartments and in having tetrasporocytes that undergo cruciate cleavage.

The Graticulaceae (fossil family) are structurally similar to the Sporolithaceae, but are Paleozoic and date back to the Wenlock (Silurian).

== Genera ==
As accepted by AlgaeBase;

- Archaeolithothamnion Rothpletz ex Foslie - 8 spp.
- Hemiphyllum Marie Lemoine - 1 sp.
- Heydrichia R.A.Townsend, Y.M.Chamberlain & Keats - 5 spp.
- Roseapetra W.A.Nelson, Twist & K.F.Neill - 1 sp.
- Sporolithon Heydrich - 46 spp.
