= Sporolithon =

- Sporolithon episporum

Scientific classification
- Domain: Eukaryota
- Supergroup: Archaeplastida
- Division: Rhodophyta
- Class: Florideophyceae
- Order: Sporolithales
- Family: Sporolithaceae
- Genus: Sporolithon; Heydrich, 1897

Species
- See text

Genus of algae

Sporolithon is a genus of red coralline algae in the family Sporolithaceae, in the order Corallinales.

Sporolithon ptychoides

== Species ==
the World Register of Marine Species includes the following species in the genus:-

- Sporolithon africanum (Foslie) J.Afonso-Carillo, 1986
- Sporolithon australasicum (Foslie) N.Yamaguishi-Tomita ex M.J.Wynne, 1986
- Sporolithon crassiramosum (Pilger) P.C.Silva, 1996
- Sporolithon crassum Heydrich, 1897
- Sporolithon durum (Foslie) R.A.Townsend & Woelkerling, 1995
- Sporolithon elevatum M.C.Henriques & R.Riosmena-Rodriguez, 2014
- Sporolithon episoredion (Adey, Townsend & Boykins) Verheij, 1992
- Sporolithon episporum (M.A.Howe) E.Y.Dawson, 1960
- Sporolithon erythraeum (Rothpletz) Kylin, 1956
- Sporolithon howei (Lemoine) N.Yamaguishi-Tomita ex M.J.Wynne, 1986
- Sporolithon indicum V.Krishnamurthy & Jayagopal, 1987
- Sporolithon lemoinei (Weber-van Bosse) Verheij, 1993
- Sporolithon liberum (M.Lemoine) J.Aguirre & J.C.Braga, 1998
- Sporolithon mediterraneum Heydrich, 1899
- Sporolithon mesophoticum J.Richards, P.W.Gabrielson & C.W.Schneider, 2018
- Sporolithon molle (Heydrich) Heydrich, 1897
- Sporolithon pacificum E.Y.Dawson, 1960
- Sporolithon ptychoides Heydrich, 1897
- Sporolithon schmidtii (Foslie) G.D.Gordon, Masaki & Akioka, 1976
- Sporolithon sibogae (Weber-van Bosse & Foslie) P.C.Silva, 1987
- Sporolithon stefaninii (Raineri) P.C.Silva, 1996
- Sporolithon tenue R.G.Bahia, G.M.Amado-Filho, G.W.Maneveldt & W.H.Adey, 2013
- Sporolithon timorense (Foslie) P.C.Silva, 1987
