= Silvetia babingtonii =

Scientific classification
- Domain: Eukaryota
- Clade: Sar
- Clade: Stramenopiles
- Division: Ochrophyta
- Class: Phaeophyceae
- Order: Fucales
- Family: Fucaceae
- Genus: Silvetia
- Species: S. babingtonii

Binomial name
- Silvetia babingtonii (Harvey, 1860) E.Serrão, T.O.Cho, S.M.Boo & Brawley, 1999

Species of algae

Silvetia babingtonii is a species of brown algae in the family Fucaceae. The population of this species in Primorsky Krai has been monitored for heavy metal pollution affected by mining. The species is named after the English botanist and professor Charles Cardale Babington.
