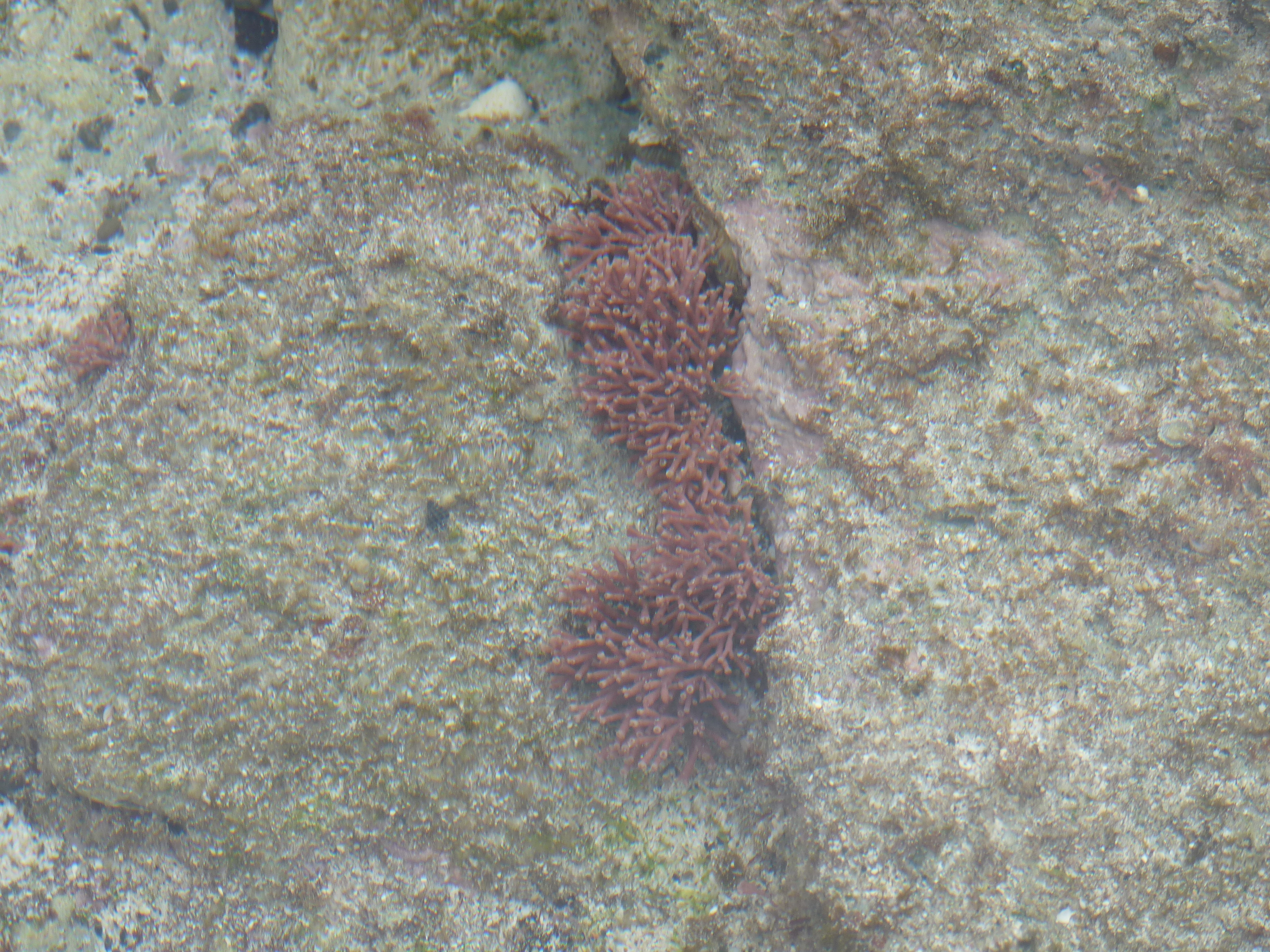
- Amphiroa beauvoisii

Scientific classification
- Domain: Eukaryota
- Clade: Archaeplastida
- Division: Rhodophyta
- Class: Florideophyceae
- Order: Corallinales
- Family: Corallinaceae
- Subfamily: Amphiroideae
- Genus: Amphiroa; J.V. Lamouroux, 1812

= Amphiroa =

Genus of algae

Amphiroa is a genus of thalloid red algae under the family Corallinaceae.

== Taxonomy and nomenclature ==
Amphiroa was first described by Jean Vincent Félix Lamouroux in 1812 with the type species for the genus being Amphiroa tribulus. This genus was named after Amphiro, a sea nymph in the epic poem of Theogony by the Greek poet Hesiod. There are currently 72 accepted species names for this genus.

== Morphology ==
Amphiroa is composed of an erect thallus that is attached to the substrate with an insconspicous crustose base, and possess mature branches differentiated into alternating areas calcified intergenicula and uncalcified genicula that is composed of more than cell layer and does not exhibit any dimerous flange-like branches. Specimens can reach around 30 cm in size. The thalli take a crustose form; dichotomous branches are formed. The organisms possess secondary pit connections. Amphiroa reproduces by means of conceptacles; it produces tetraspores. Its pore canals are lined with parallel filaments; the morphology of the pore canal is a key trait used to delineate species within the genus.

== Distribution ==
Amphiroa is a cosmopolitan genus inhabiting the tropics up to the temperate regions.

== Ecology ==
This genus is found from the intertidal down to the subtidal areas of the reef.

== Life history ==
Amphiroa exhibit a triphasic life cycle, however, their tetrasporangia, spermatangia, and carposporangia are borne out of a specialized organ called a conceptacle. This triphasic cycle involves the production of tetraspores (N) from the tetrasporophyte (2N) and the subsequent development of the tetraspores into either the male or female gametophyte (N); the resulting spermatium produced by the male gametophyte is later on trapped by the trichogyne of the female gametophyte leading to their eventual fusion and development of the carposporophyte (2N); the cycle is complete when the carpospores (2N) are released and develops into the next set of tetrasporophytes.

== Exploitation, harvesting, and cultivation ==
Amphiroa species are unpalatable due to its thallus being highly calcified, and thus there is no immediate cultivation and use for the seaweed.

== Chemical composition and natural products chemistry ==
Amphiroa contains several bioactive compounds similar to other seaweeds, for example, the ellagic acid, gallic acid, and phenolic compounds within A. anceps has shown to be a potential anti-fungal agent, moreover, the addition of A. fragilissima polysaccharides have shown to improve the gut of farmed shrimp.

== Utilization and management ==
This genus is currently not being utilized and managed on a commercial scale due to a lack of culture technology.

== Species ==
The valid species that are currently considered belonging to this genus are the following:

1. Amphiroa anastomosans Weber Bosse
2. Amphiroa anceps (Lamarck) Decaisne
3. Amphiroa annobonensis Pilger
4. Amphiroa annulata Me.Lemoine
5. Amphiroa articulata (Bory) Athanasiadis
6. Amphiroa beauvoisii J.V.Lamouroux
7. Amphiroa bowerbankii Harvey
8. Amphiroa brasiliana Decaisne
9. Amphiroa breviarticulata Areschoug
10. Amphiroa canaliculata G.Martens
11. Amphiroa capensis Areschoug
12. Amphiroa compressa M.Lemoine
13. Amphiroa crassa J.V.Lamouroux
14. Amphiroa crosslandii M.Lemoine
15. Amphiroa crustiformis E.Y.Dawson
16. Amphiroa cryptarthrodia Zanardini
17. Amphiroa cumingii Montagne
18. Amphiroa currae Ganesan
19. Amphiroa dimorpha Me.Lemoine
20. Amphiroa echigoensis Yendo
21. Amphiroa ephedraea (Lamarck) Decaisne
22. Amphiroa exilis Harvey
23. Amphiroa foliacea J.V.Lamouroux
24. Amphiroa fragilissima (Linnaeus) J.V.Lamouroux
25. Amphiroa franciscana W.R.Taylor
26. Amphiroa galapagensis W.R.Taylor
27. Amphiroa gracilis Harvey
28. Amphiroa hancockii W.R.Taylor
29. Amphiroa howensis A.H.S.Lucas
30. Amphiroa irregularis Kützing
31. Amphiroa itonoi Srimanobhas & Masaki
32. Amphiroa klochkovana A.S.Harvey, W.J.Woelkerling & A.J.K.Millar
33. Amphiroa kuetzingiana Trevisan
34. Amphiroa magdalenensis E.Y.Dawson
35. Amphiroa maletractata Simonsen
36. Amphiroa minutissima W.R.Taylor
37. Amphiroa misakiensis Yendo
38. Amphiroa nodularia (Pallas) Decaisne
39. Amphiroa nodulosa Kützing
40. Amphiroa pacifica Kützing
41. Amphiroa peruana Areschoug ex W.R.Taylor
42. Amphiroa polymorpha M.Lemoine
43. Amphiroa prefragilissima Me.Lemoine
44. Amphiroa pusilla Yendo
45. Amphiroa rigida J.V.Lamouroux
46. Amphiroa rubra (Philippi) Woelkerling
47. Amphiroa setacea Kützing
48. Amphiroa subcylindrica E.Y.Dawson
49. Amphiroa taylorii E.Y.Dawson
50. Amphiroa tribulus (J.Ellis & Solander) J.V.Lamouroux - type
51. Amphiroa ungulata Montagne & Millardet
52. Amphiroa valonioides Yendo
53. Amphiroa vanbosseae Me.Lemoine
54. Amphiroa yendoi Børgesen
55. Amphiroa yendoi De Toni
