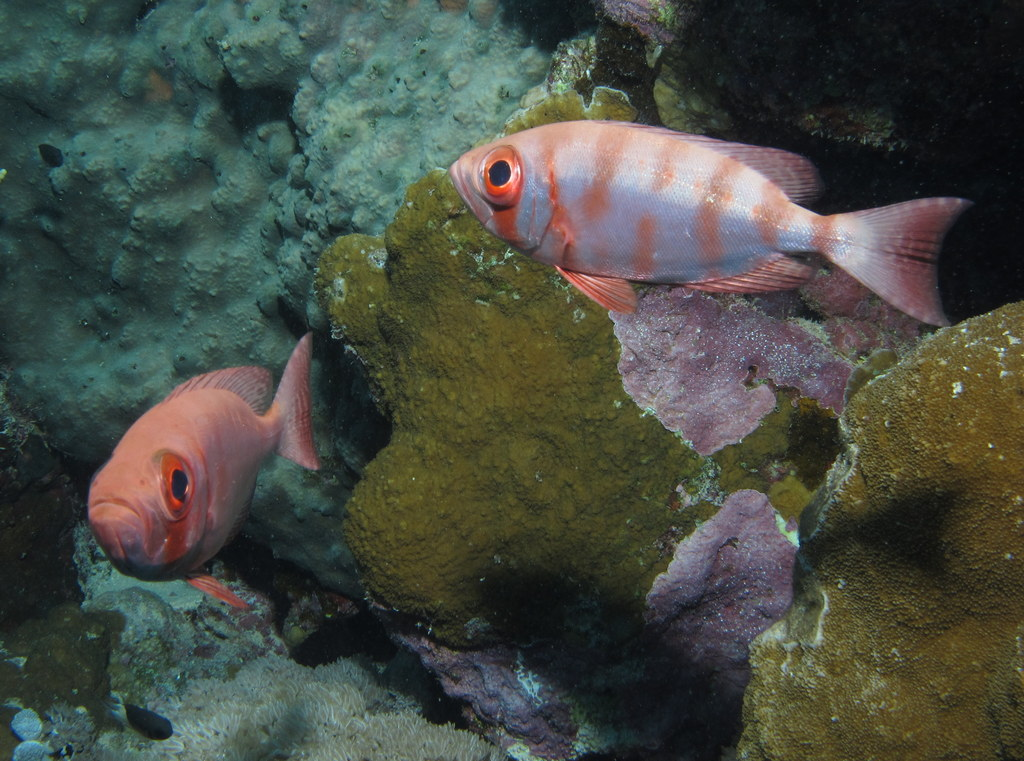
- Pair of Priacanthus hamrur above coral with patches of Pneophyllum conicum at Marsa Shouna, Red Sea, Egypt

Scientific classification
- Domain: Eukaryota
- Clade: Archaeplastida
- Division: Rhodophyta
- Class: Florideophyceae
- Order: Corallinales
- Family: Corallinaceae
- Subfamily: Mastophoroideae
- Genus: Pneophyllum; Kütz.

= Pneophyllum =

Genus of algae

Pneophyllum is a genus of multicellular red algae in the family Corallinaceae and subfamily Chamberlainoideae.

== Species ==
This genus includes the following species:

- Pneophyllum amplexifrons (Harvey) Y. M. Chamberlain & R. E. Norris
- Pneophyllum cetinaensis Silva & Johansen, 1986
- Pneophyllum confervicola (Kützing) Y. M. Chamberlain
- Pneophyllum conicum (E. Y. Dawson) Keats, Y. M. Chamberlain & Baba
- Pneophyllum coronata Rosanoff, 1994
- Pneophyllum coronatum (Rosanoff) Penrose
- Pneophyllum fragile Kützing
- Pneophyllum limitatum (Foslie) Y. M. Chamberlain
- Pneophyllum lobescens Y. M. Chamberlain, 1983
- Pneophyllum mauritianum (Foslie) P.C.Silva
- Pneophyllum myriocarpum (P.Crouan & H.Crouan) Y. M. Chamberlain, 1983
- Pneophyllum zonale (P.L.Crouan & H.M.Crouan) Y. M. Chamberlain
- Pneophyllum zostericola (Foslie) Kloczcova, also known as sea leek leaf-sucking algae
