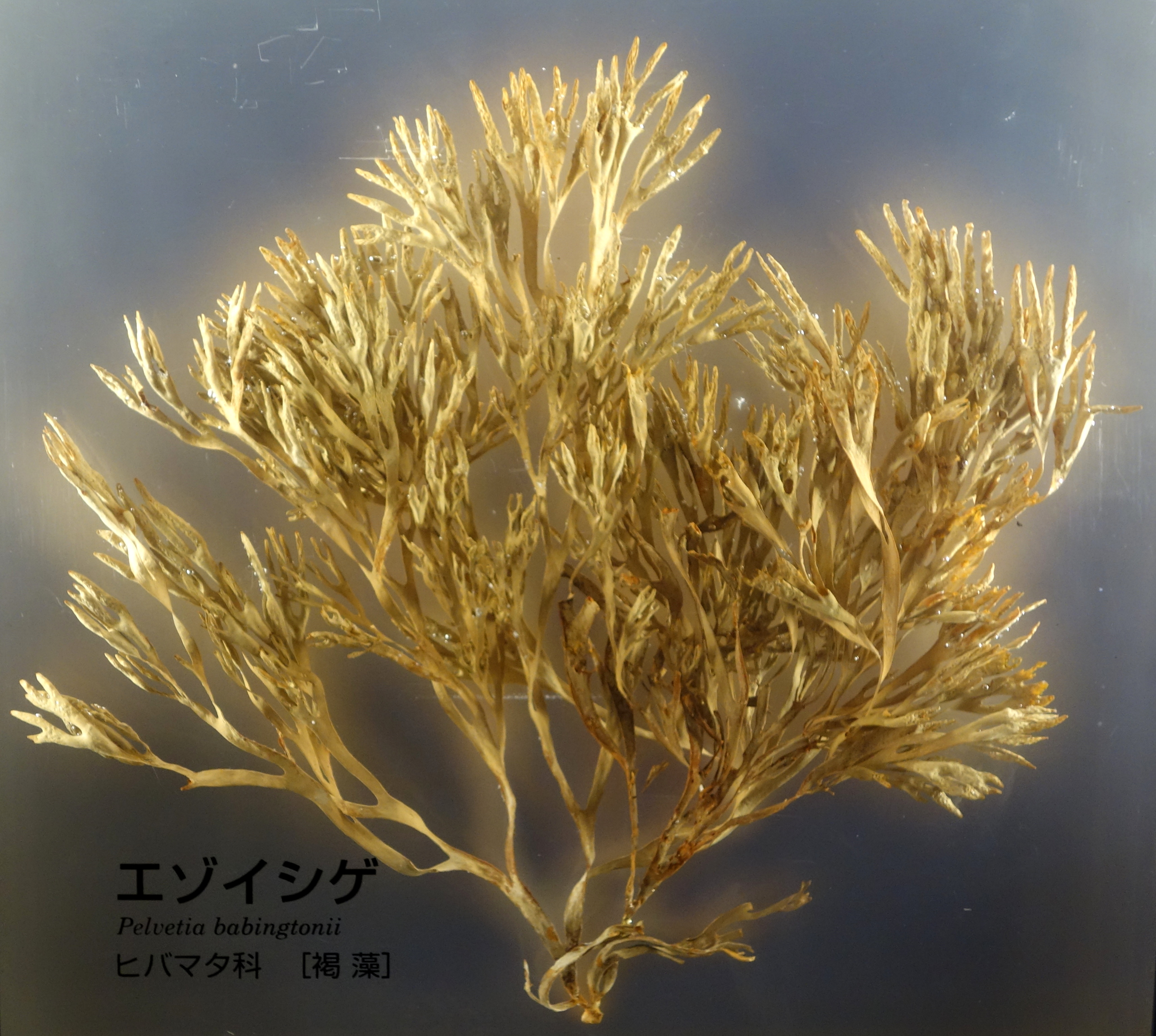
- Silvetia babingtonii

Scientific classification
- Domain: Eukaryota
- Clade: Sar
- Clade: Stramenopiles
- Division: Ochrophyta
- Class: Phaeophyceae
- Order: Fucales
- Family: Fucaceae
- Genus: Silvetia; E. Serrão, T.O. Cho, S.M. Boo & S.H. Brawley, 1999

= Silvetia =

Genus of seaweeds

Silvetia is a genus of brown algae, commonly known as rockweed, found in the intertidal zone of rocky seashores of the Pacific Ocean. These were originally classified as members of the genus Pelvetia. In 1999, Silvetia sp. was created as a separate species from Pelvetia canaliculata due to differences of oogonium structure and of nucleic acid sequences of the rDNA. It was renamed in honor of Paul Silva, Curator of Algae at the Herbarium of the University of California, Berkeley. There are three species and one subspecies.

== Taxonomy ==
This list of species of Silvetia contains those considered to belong to this genus as of 2013:

- Silvetia babingtonii (Harvey) E.Serrão, T.O.Cho, S.M.Boo & Brawley, 1999
- Silvetia compressa (J.Agardh) E.Serrão, T.O.Cho, S.M.Boo & Brawley, 1999
  - Silvetia compressa subsp. deliquescens P.C.Silva, 2004
- Silvetia siliquosa (Tseng & C. F. Chang) E.Serrão, T.O.Cho, S.M.Boo & Brawley, 1999
