= Rhodogorgonales =

Scientific classification
- Domain: Eukaryota
- Clade: Archaeplastida
- Division: Rhodophyta
- Class: Florideophyceae
- Subclass: Corallinophycidae
- Order: Rhodogorgonales; S. Fredericq, J.N. Norris & C. Pueschel

Families
- See text

Order of algae

The Rhodogorgonales are an order of red algae, a sister group to the corallines. They are always thalloid and calcified; their calcification is very different from the corallines, as individual calcite crystals are deposited in the cell wall of specialised cells; this suggests that the evolution of calcification may have been independent from the corallines. They have no fossil record.

Unlike the corallinales and sporolithales, their closest relatives, these thalli are loose aggregations of hair-like cells, with the middle portion formed of rhizoid-like filaments. Spores are borne on the end of hair-like cells (cortical fascicles).

Images can be seen in "Rhodogorgon ramosissima J. N. Norris & Bucher (Rhodogorgonales, Rhodogorgonaceae, Rhodophyta), registro nuevo para la Costa Venezolana". Acta Bot. Venez. 29 (2). 2006.

== Families ==
As accepted by AlgaeBase;

- Family Elianellaceae B.Granier (13 species)
  - Anchisolenopora Vachard, P.Cózar, Aretz & Izart - 1 sp.
  - Elianella Pfender & Basse - 1 sp.
  - Marinella Pfender - 2 spp.
  - Parachaetetes Deninger - 8 spp.
  - Solenoporella Shuysky - 1 sp.
- Family Rhodogorgonaceae S.Fredericq, J.N.Norris & C.Pueschel (5 species)
  - Renouxia Fredericq & J.N.Norris, 1995 - 2 spp.
  - Rhodenigma J.A.West, Verbruggen & Loiseaux - 1 sp.
  - Rhodogorgon J.N.Norris & K.E.Bucher, 1989 - 2 spp.
