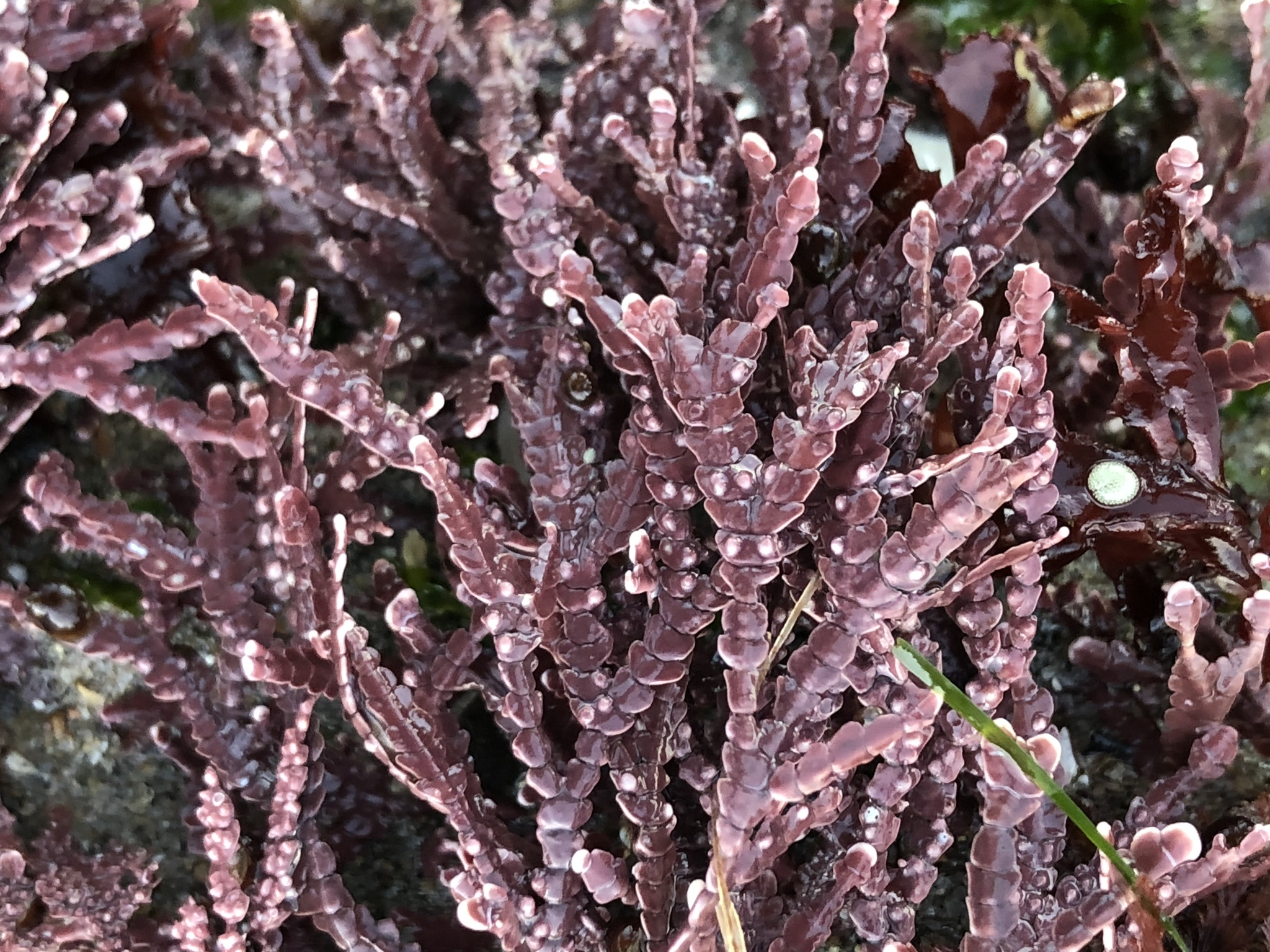
- Bossiella orbigniana

Scientific classification
- Clade: Archaeplastida
- Division: Rhodophyta
- Class: Florideophyceae
- Order: Corallinales
- Family: Corallinaceae
- Subfamily: Corallinoideae
- Genus: Bossiella; P.C. Silva, 1957

= Bossiella =

Genus of algae

Bossiella is a genus of coralline algae with 5 recognised species. It reproduces via conceptacles; individual thalli only produce conceptacles of a single sex.

== Species ==
The valid species currently considered to belong to this genus are:

- Bossiella californica
- Bossiella chiloensis
- Bossiella compressa
- Bossiella orbigniana
- Bossiella plumosa
