= Mastophora (alga) =

Scientific classification
- Clade: Archaeplastida
- Division: Rhodophyta
- Class: Florideophyceae
- Order: Corallinales
- Family: Corallinaceae
- Subfamily: Mastophoroideae
- Genus: Mastophora; Decaisne, 1842

Genus of algae

Mastophora is a genus of thalloid alga comprising four species. The dimerous, crustose thalli comprise two groups of filaments. The bulk of the thallus is made of erect filaments, which may be one or many cells long. These grow approximately perpendicular to the filaments of a basal layer, usually one cell thick. haustoria, haustoria, and palisade cellsare present in the organisms but lack secondary pit connections. Mastophora reproduces by means of conceptacles; it produces tetraspores and dispores.

== Species ==
The valid species currently considered to belong to this genus are:

- Mastophora laevis
- Mastophora pacifica
- Mastophora rosea
- Mastophora variegata
