= Metagoniolithoideae =

Scientific classification
- Clade: Archaeplastida
- Division: Rhodophyta
- Class: Florideophyceae
- Order: Corallinales
- Family: Corallinaceae
- Subfamily: Metagoniolithoideae; H.W. Johansen, 1969

Subfamily of algae

The Metagoniolithoideae are a monogeneric subfamily of genucilate Corallinaceaen coralline algae.
