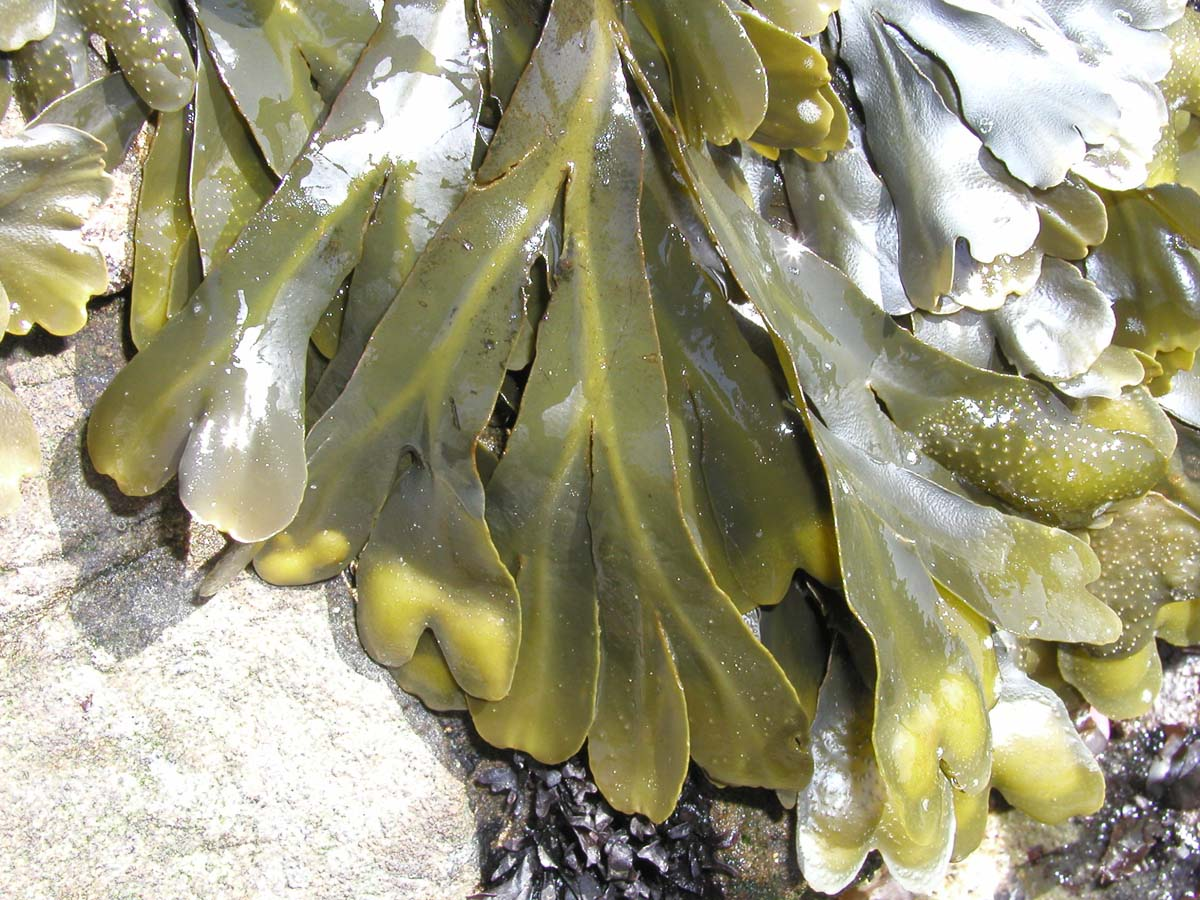

Scientific classification
- Domain: Eukaryota
- Clade: Diaphoretickes
- Clade: SAR
- Clade: Stramenopiles
- Phylum: Gyrista
- Subphylum: Ochrophytina
- Class: Phaeophyceae
- Order: Fucales
- Family: Fucaceae
- Genus: Fucus
- Species: F. gardneri

Binomial name
- Fucus gardneri P.C.Silva, 1953

= Fucus gardneri =

Species of Phaeophyceae

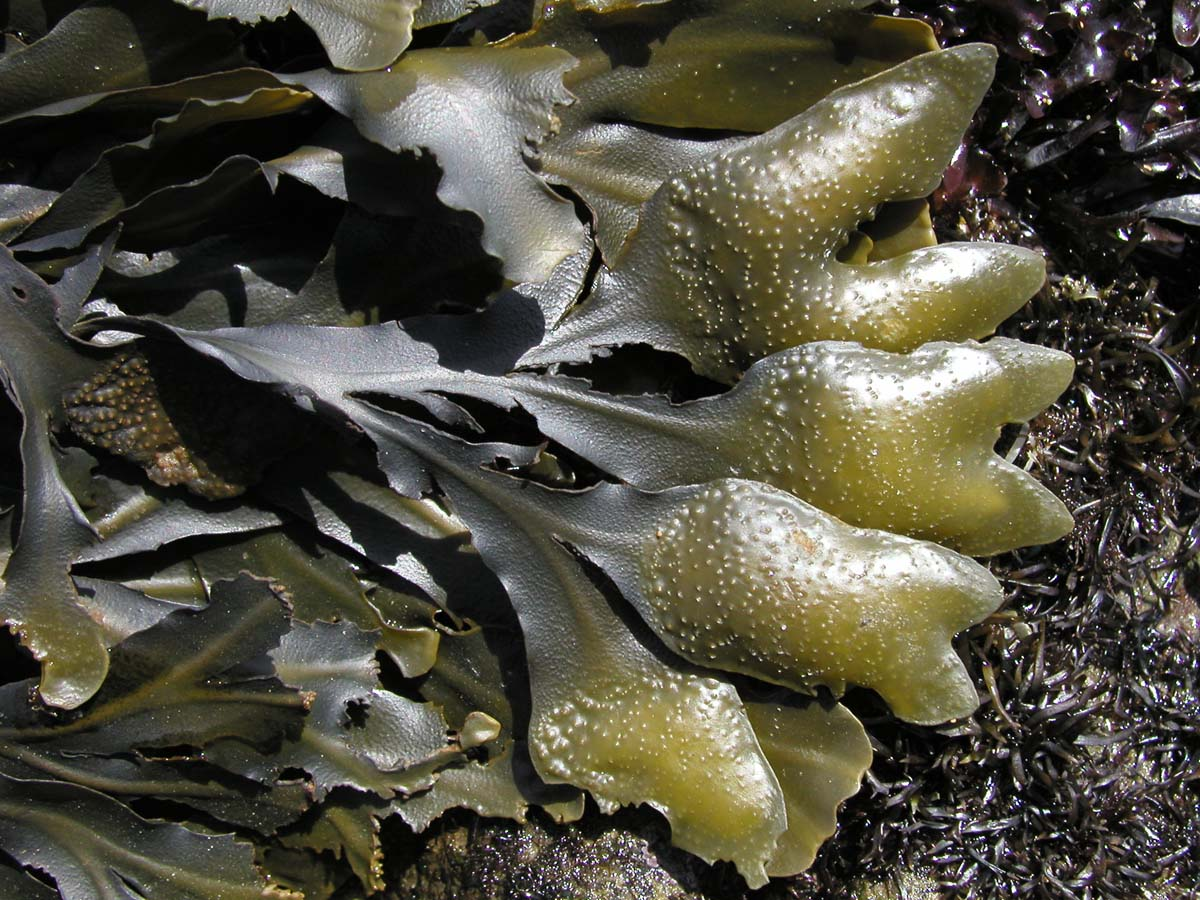
Closeup of the mature tips of Fucus gardneri

Fucus gardneri is a species of seaweed, a brown alga living on the littoral shore of the Pacific coasts of North America. It has the common names of rockweed and bladderwrack.

== Description ==
Fucus gardneri is olive brown in colour and similar to Fucus spiralis. It grows to 40–50 centimetres (16–20 in) long and branches somewhat irregularly dichotomous and is attached, generally to rock, by a discoid holdfast. It has airsacks at the top.

== Life history ==
The tips of mature individuals swell up and provide flotation for the plant as well as reproductive chambers for developing sperm and eggs. During low tide, the swollen tips dry up squeezing out sperm and eggs which unite into a zygote during the next flood tide and settle onto a substratum.

== Ecology ==
Rockweed can form thick bands in the middle intertidal on rocky substrates. The other common species of Fucus: Fucus spiralis, Fucus vesiculosus and Fucus serratus along with Ascophyllum nodosum form the main and dominant seaweeds on rocky shores. These three species, along with two others Pelvetia canaliculata and Ascophyllum nodosum form the zones along the shore.

== Uses and history ==
Native Americans historically harvested the dried swollen tips of Fucus gardneri – sometimes referred to as "Indian pop corn". When the airbubbles are popped, it secretes a thick lotion, very moisturizing.
