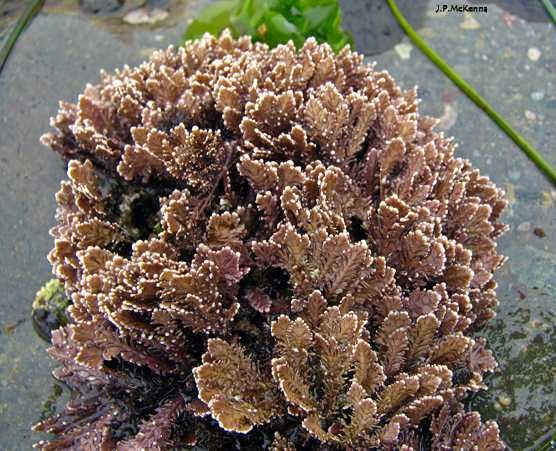
- Corallina pinnatifolia

Scientific classification
- Domain: Eukaryota
- Clade: Archaeplastida
- Division: Rhodophyta
- Class: Florideophyceae
- Order: Corallinales
- Family: Corallinaceae
- Genus: Corallina; Linnaeus, 1758

= Corallina =

Genus of red seaweeds

Corallina is a genus of red seaweeds with hard, abrasive calcareous skeletons in the family Corallinaceae. They are stiff, branched frond-like protists with articulated stipes. Corallina, like all red algae, are not considered plants under some definitions, but can be considered as belonging to plants in a broad sense.

== Species ==
1. Corallina aberrans (Yendo) K.R.Hind & G.W.Saunders
2. Corallina abundans Me.Lemoine
3. Corallina arbuscula Postels & Ruprecht
4. Corallina armata J.D.Hooker & Harvey
5. Corallina bathybentha E.Y.Dawson
6. Corallina berteroi Montagne ex Kützing
7. Corallina bifurca Kützing
8. Corallina binangonensis Ishijima
9. Corallina confusa Yendo
10. Corallina cossmannii Me.Lemoine
11. Corallina crassisima (Yendo) K.Hind & G.W.Saunders
12. Corallina declinata (Yendo) K.Hind & G.W.Saunders
13. Corallina ferreyrae E.Y.Dawson, Acleto & Foldvik
14. Corallina goughensis Y.M.Chamberlain
15. Corallina hombronii (Montagne) Montagne ex Kützing
16. Corallina maxima (Yendo) K.R.Hind & G.W.Saunders
17. Corallina melobesioides (Segawa) Martone, S.C.Lindstrom, K.A.Miller & P.W.Gabrielson
18. Corallina microptera Montagne
19. Corallina muscoides Kützing
20. Corallina officinalis Linnaeus - type
21. Corallina panizzoi R.Schnetter & U.Richter
22. Corallina pilulifera Postels & Ruprecht
23. Corallina pinnatifolia (Manza) E.Y.Dawson
24. Corallina polysticha E.Y.Dawson
25. Corallina rigida Kützing
26. Corallina sachalinensis Klochkova
27. Corallina sandwicensis Reinbold
28. Corallina vancouveriensis Yendo
