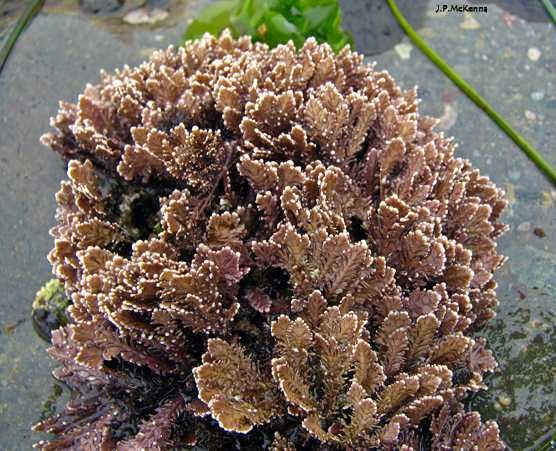
- Corallina pinnatifolia

Scientific classification
- Clade: Archaeplastida
- Division: Rhodophyta
- Class: Florideophyceae
- Order: Corallinales
- Family: Corallinaceae; Lamouroux, 1812

Subfamilies
- Amphiroideae; Corallinoideae; Lithophylloideae; Mastophoroideae; Metagoniolithoideae

= Corallinaceae =

Corallinaceae Temporal range: Mesozoic–recent

Family of algae

The Corallinaceae are one of the two extant Coralline families of red algae; they are differentiated from the morphologically similar Sporolithaceae by their formation of grouped sporangial chambers, clustered into sori. The Corallinoideae is monophyletic; the other subfamilies form another monophyletic group.

== Genera ==
The following genera are listed in the World Register of Marine Species:

- Subfamily Amphiroideae
  - Genus Amphiroa J.V. Lamouroux, 1812
  - Genus Lithothrix J.E. Gray, 1867
- Subfamily Corallinoideae
  - Genus Alatocladia (Yendo) Johansen, 1969
  - Genus Arthrocardia Decaisne, 1842
  - Genus Bossiella P.C. Silva, 1957
  - Genus Calliarthron Manza, 1937
  - Genus Cheilosporum (Decaisne) Zanardini, 1844
  - Genus Chiharaea Johansen, 1966
  - Genus Corallina Linnaeus, 1758
  - Genus Ellisolandia K.R.Hind & G.W.Saunders, 2013
  - Genus Haliptilon (Decaisne) Lindley, 1846
  - Genus Jania J.V. Lamouroux, 1812
  - Genus Marginisporum (Yendo) Ganesan, 1968
  - Genus Pachyarthron Manza, 1937
  - Genus Rhizolamiella Shevejko, 1982
  - Genus Serraticardia (Yendo) P.C. Silva, 1957
  - Genus Yamadaia Segawa, 1955
- Subfamily Lithophylloideae
  - Genus Crodelia Heydrich, 1911
  - Genus Ezo Adey, Masaki & Akioka, 1974
  - Genus Lithophyllum Philippi, 1837
  - Genus Paulsilvella Woelkerling, Sartoni & Boddi, 2002
  - Genus Titanoderma Nägeli in Nägeli & Cramer, 1858
- Subfamily Mastophoroideae
  - Genus Hydrolithon Foslie, 1909
  - Genus Lesueuria Woelkerling & Ducker, 1987
  - Genus Mastophora Decaisne, 1842
  - Genus Metamastophora Setchell, 1943
  - Genus Neogoniolithon Setchell & Mason, 1943
  - Genus Paraspora Heydrich, 1900
  - Genus Pneophyllum Kützing, 1843
  - Genus Spongites Kützing, 1841
- Subfamily Metagoniolithoideae
  - Genus Metagoniolithon Weber-van Bosse, 1904
- Unassigned
  - Genus Archaeolithothamnion Foslie, 1898
  - Genus Archaeolithothamnium Rothpletz, 1891
  - Genus Dermatolithon Foslie, 1898
  - Genus Fosliella M.A. Howe, 1920
  - Genus Heteroderma Foslie, 1909
  - Genus Litholepis
  - Genus Lithoporella (Foslie) Foslie, 1909
  - Genus Masakia Kloszcova, 1987
  - Genus Masakiella Guiry & Selivanova, 2007
  - Genus Multisiphonia R. C. Tsao & Y. Z. Liang, 1974
  - Genus Paracolonnella Y.Z. Liang & R.C. Tsao, 1974
  - Genus Paraconophyton Y.Z. Liang & R.C. Tsao, 1974
  - Genus Porolithon Foslie, 1909
  - Genus Pseudogymnosolen Y.Z. Liang & R.C. Tsao, 1974
  - Genus Pseudolithophyllum Marie Lemoine, 1913
