= Flora of New Zealand =

Plant species of New Zealand

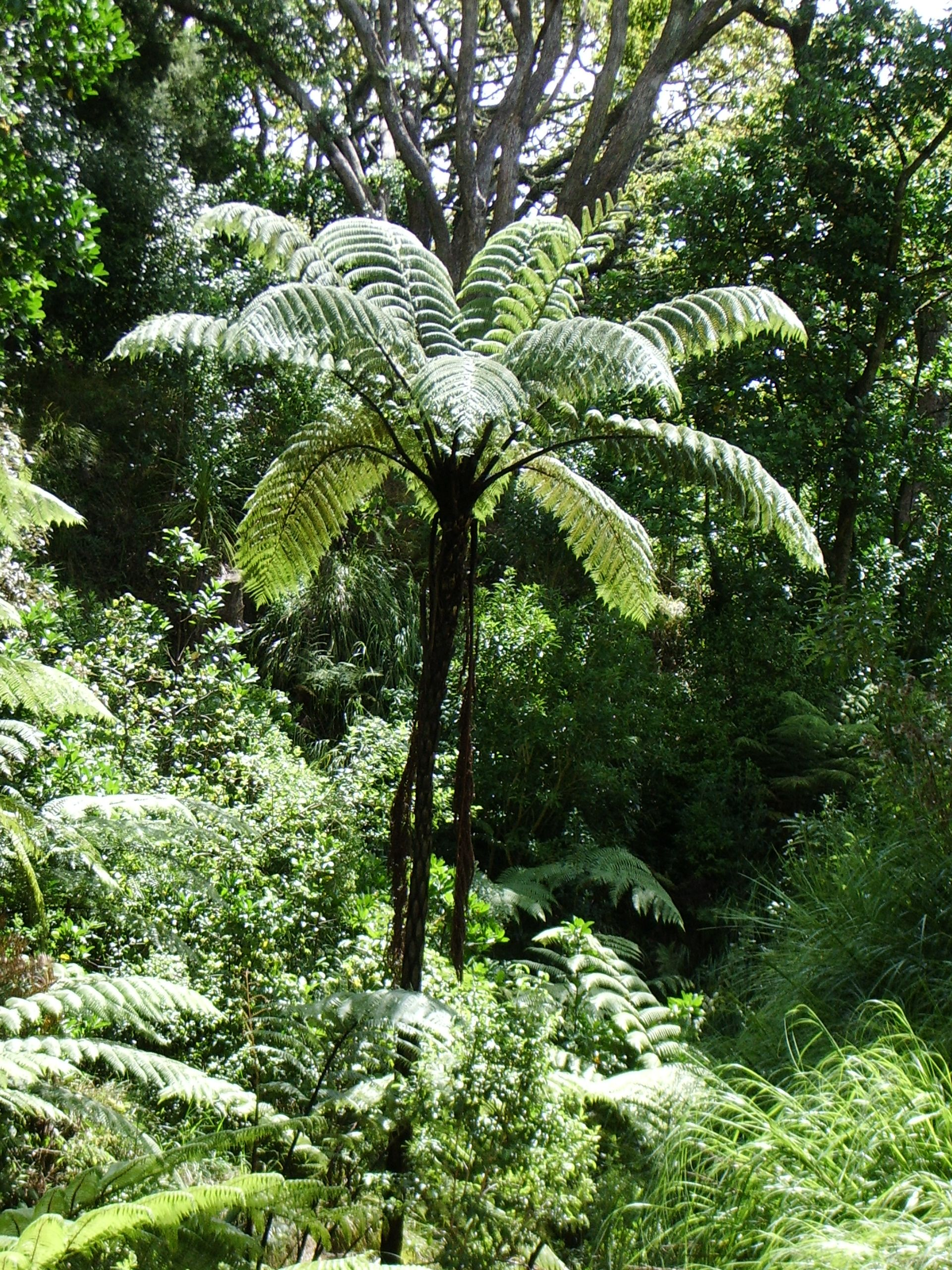
A black tree fern in the Auckland Domain

This article relates to the flora of New Zealand, especially indigenous strains. New Zealand's geographical isolation has meant the country has developed a unique variety of native flora. However, human migration has led to the importation of many other plants (generally referred to as 'exotics' in New Zealand) as well as widespread damage to the indigenous flora, especially after the advent of European colonisation, due to the combined efforts of farmers and specialised societies dedicated to importing European plants and animals.

== Characteristics ==
The native flora of New Zealand is predominantly evergreen, with few annual herbs and few cold-tolerant trees. Most species have seeds dispersed by birds, and many are dioecious, with male and female flowers borne on separate plants. Flowers are typically small and white. Few species fix nitrogen or are adapted to fire, and very few have defences against browsing mammals. Many plants have a divaricating growth form, characterised by densely interlacing branches that spread at wide angles, and many have evolved larger forms than related plant families elsewhere.

== Trees and shrubs ==
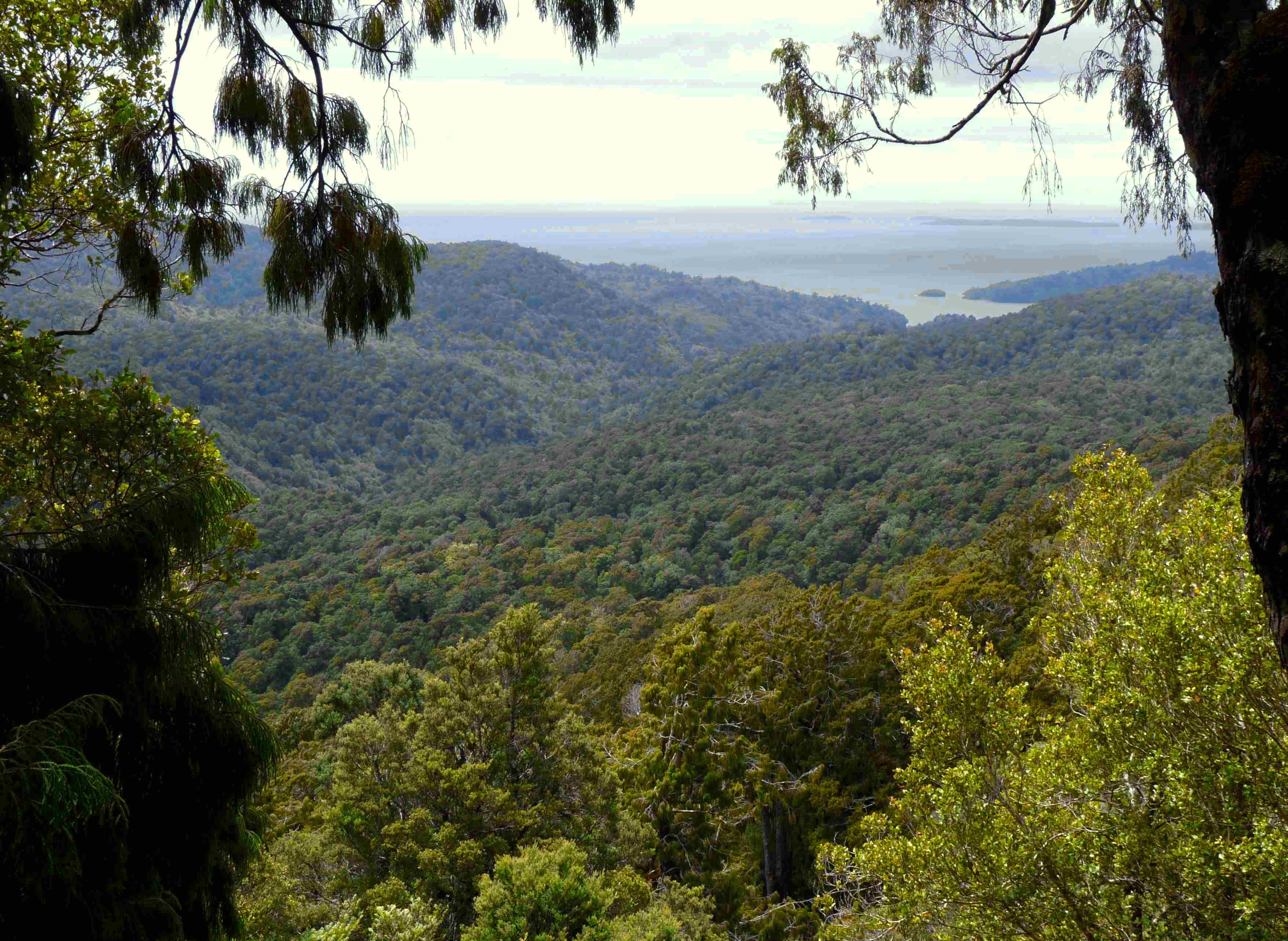
Native forest on Stewart Island / Rakiura

New Zealand's long geological isolation means that most of its flora is unique, with many durable hard woods. There is a wide variety of native trees, adapted to all the various micro-climates in New Zealand. The native bush (forest) ranges from the subtropical kauri forests of the northern North Island, temperate rainforests of the West Coast, the alpine forests of the Southern Alps and Fiordland to the coastal forests of the Abel Tasman National Park and the Catlins.

In the early period of British colonisation, many New Zealand trees were known by names derived from the names of unrelated European trees, but more recently the trend has been to adopt the native Māori language names into English. For a listing in order of Māori name, with species names for most, see the Flora of New Zealand list of vernacular names.

The New Zealand Plant Conservation Network has published a list of New Zealand indigenous vascular plants including all 574 native trees and shrubs. This list also identifies which trees are endemic to New Zealand and which are threatened with extinction.

== Ferns ==
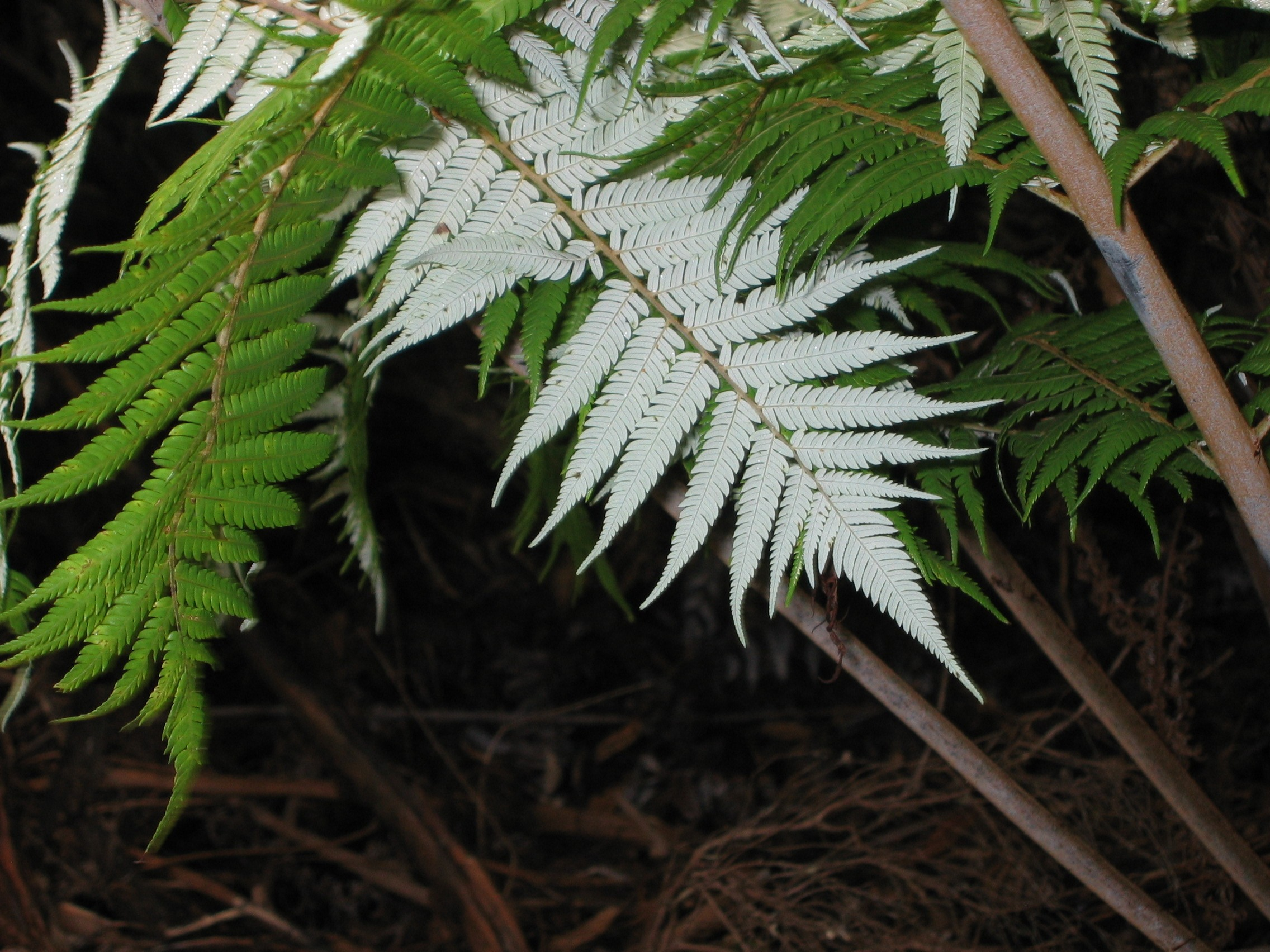
Silver Fern

While most of the world's ferns grow in tropical climates, New Zealand hosts an unusual number of ferns for a temperate country. These exhibit a variety of forms, from stereotypical feather-shaped tufted ferns and tree ferns to less typical filmy, leafy and climbing ferns. Both the koru, in the shape of an unfurling fern frond, and the silver fern are widely accepted symbols of New Zealand.

New Zealand has ten species of tree ferns, but there are numerous ground, climbing and perching smaller ferns to be found throughout the countries forests, the largest of which is the king fern.

True ferns in the Division Pteridophyta are native to New Zealand. The ferns of Alsophila, Sphaeropteris and Dicksonia are tree ferns that can grow quite high, all the other genus groups are that of ground, climbing or perching ferns.

== Seaweeds ==
New Zealand is impacted by a diversity of sea water systems including the ocean fronts the Tasman Front, the Subantartic Front, and the Subtropical Front. These each have different properties have a significant influence on the seaweed flora of the long coastlines of New Zealand. There are around 900 species of seaweed that occur in the New Zealand region but it's likely that there are species that have yet to be formally described or discovered. A commonly found seaweed is Neptune's necklace.

The red seaweeds belong to the following family and genera:

.

.
- Erythrotrichiaceae.
  - Pyrophyllon, 2 species.
- Bangiaceae
  - 'Bangia', more than 12 species.
  - Dione, 1 species.
  - Minerva, 1 species
  - 'Bangiales blades', about 35 species.
  - Clymene, 1 species.
  - Pyropia, 5 species.
- Hildenbrandiaceae
  - Apophlaea, 2 species.
  - Hildenbrandia, poorly known.
- Balliaceae.
  - Ballia, 1 species.
- Corallinaceae.
  - Corallina, 1 species.
  - Jania, 4 species.
  - Lithophyllum, 2 species.
  - Pneophyllum, 1 species
  - Spongites, 1 species
- Hapalidiaceae
  - Mesophyllum, 1 species
  - Phymatolithon, 1 species
  - Synarthrophyton, 2 species
- Sporolithaceae
  - Heydrichia, 1 species
- Liagoraceae
  - Liagora, 1 species
  - Nemalion, 1 species
- Scinaiaceae
  - Nothogenia, 3 species
  - Scinaia, 1 species
- Bonnemaisoniaceae
  - Asparagopsis, 1 species
  - Delisea, 3 species
  - Ptilonia, 2 species
- Callithamniaceae
  - Euptilota, 4 species
- Ceramiaceae
  - Centroceras, 1 species
  - Pterothamnion, 1 species
- Dasyaceae
  - Dasya, 1 species
  - Heterosiphonia, 1 species
- Delesseriaceae
  - Abroteia, 1 species
  - Acrosorium, 2 species
- Lomentariaceae
  - Lomentaria, 2 species
- Rhodymenaceae
  - Rhodymenia, 3 species

== Liverworts ==
New Zealand has a greater density of liverworts than any other country, due to its cool, wet and temperate climate. About half the species are endemic to New Zealand.

There are 606 species known in New Zealand. While these include some thallose liverworts, with liver-shaped thalli, most are leafy liverworts which can be confused with mosses and filmy ferns. Undescribed species, and those not previously recorded in New Zealand, continue to be found in lowland forests. Ninety species and varieties are listed on the 2001 Department of Conservation threatened plants list, and 157 liverwort species and varieties will be included on the next version of the list as a result of better knowledge of the group.

== Grasses ==
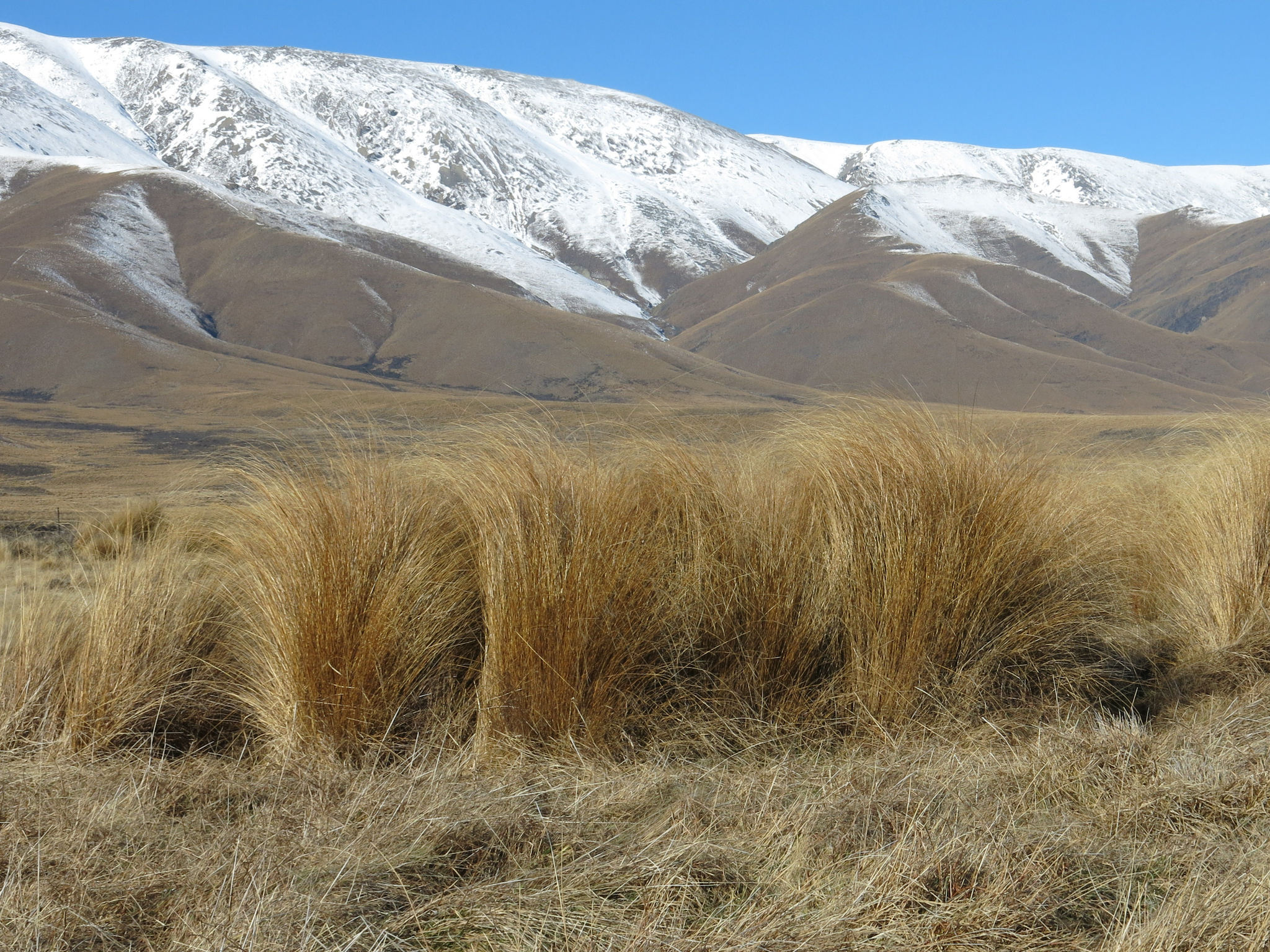
Chionochloa rubra - (red tussock) is a widely dispersed New Zealand endemic tussock grass

The grass family Poaceae is one of the largest plant families in New Zealand. There are 496 grass species recorded, the majority of which are introduced and naturalised - a total of 285 of the species including one eradicated species and 54 casually naturalised species. Of the 194 indigenous species, the majority, 165 species, are endemic.

== Mosses ==
There are 523 known moss species and 23 varieties in New Zealand, with 208 genera represented. 108 species and 11 genera are considered endemic. Most New Zealand mosses originated in Gondwana, so there are strong relationships with species in Tasmania, South-eastern Australia, and temperate parts of South America.

Sphagnum moss is also of economic importance.

== Other ==
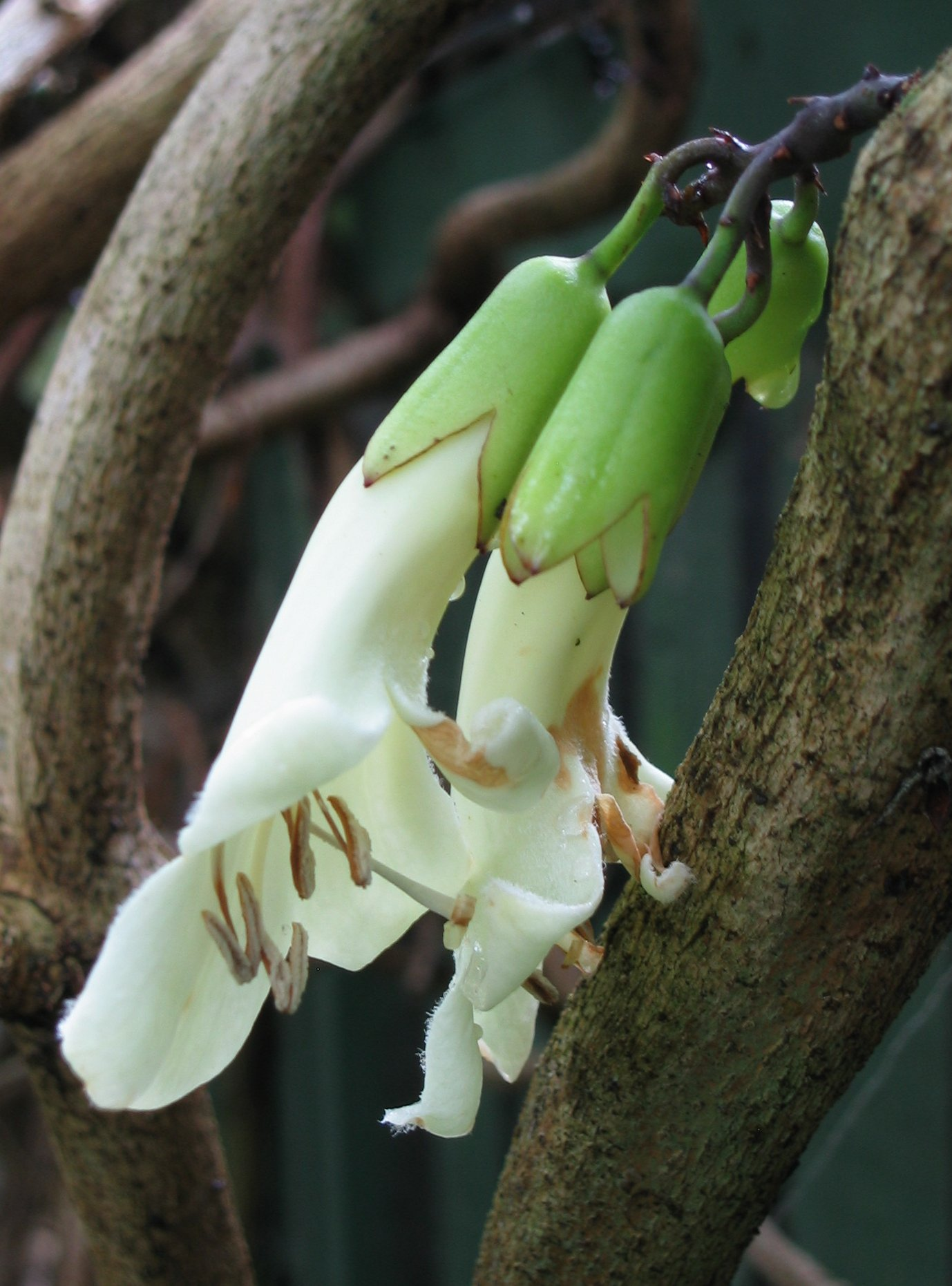
Flowers of Tecomanthe speciosa

- Bush lawyer
- Celmisia (mountain daisy)
- Megaherbs
- Nine species of mistletoe, including Peraxilla colensoi, Peraxilla tetrapetala, Alepis flavida, and the extinct Trilepidea adamsii (last seen in 1954).
- Two species of Drosera, including Drosera arcturi and the endemic Drosera stenopetala.
- Mount Cook lily
- New Zealand flax
- New Zealand spinach (kokihi)
- Pingao
- Sison amomum, commonly known as stone parsley
- Raupō or bulrush
- Supplejack
- Tecomanthe speciosa
- Wood rose

== See also ==
- Environment of New Zealand
- Biodiversity of New Zealand
- Fauna of New Zealand
- Hebe Society
