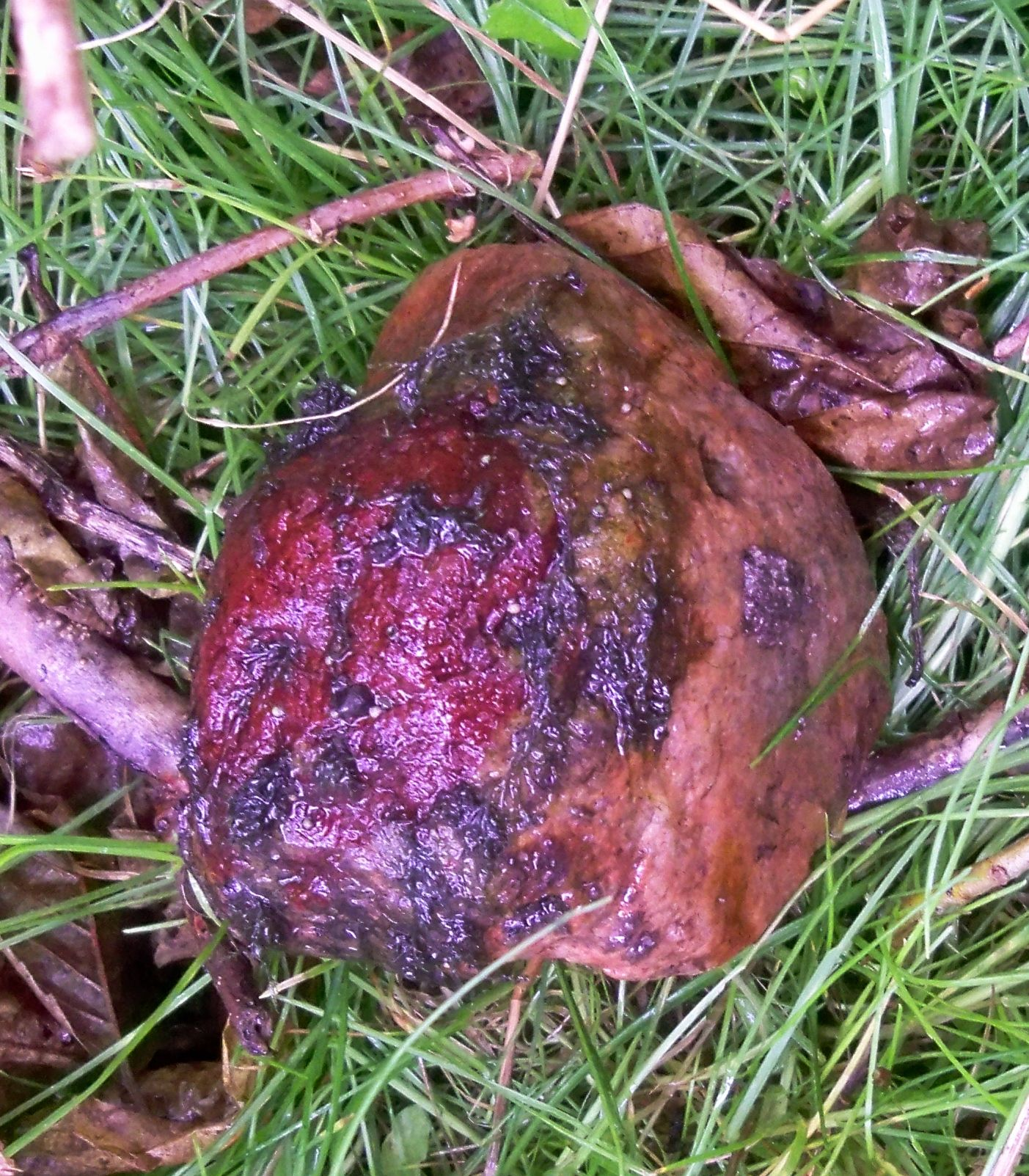
- Hildenbrandia rivularis forming a crusted coating on the stone (for illustration purposes, the stone was taken out of the water)

Scientific classification
- Domain: Eukaryota
- Supergroup: Archaeplastida
- Division: Rhodophyta
- Class: Florideophyceae
- Order: Hildenbrandiales
- Family: Hildenbrandiaceae
- Genus: Hildenbrandia
- Species: H. rivularis

Binomial name
- Hildenbrandia rivularis (Liebm.) J.Agardh 1851:379, 495

Synonyms
- Erythroclathrus rivularis Liebm. 1838; Cruoria rivularis (Liebm.) Aresch. 1843; Hildenbrandtia rosea var. fluviatilis Bréb.; Hildenbrandia fluviatilis Bréb.; Hildenbrandia rosea var. fluviatilis Kütz.; Hildenbrandia paroliniana Zanardini 1841

= Hildenbrandia rivularis =

Species of freshwater red algae

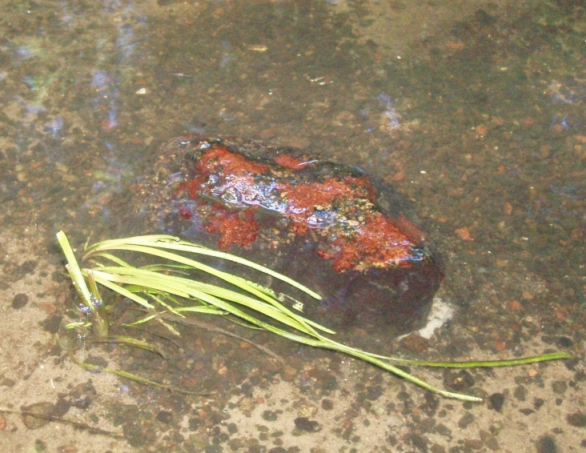
Specimens from the Kirsna river in Warmia

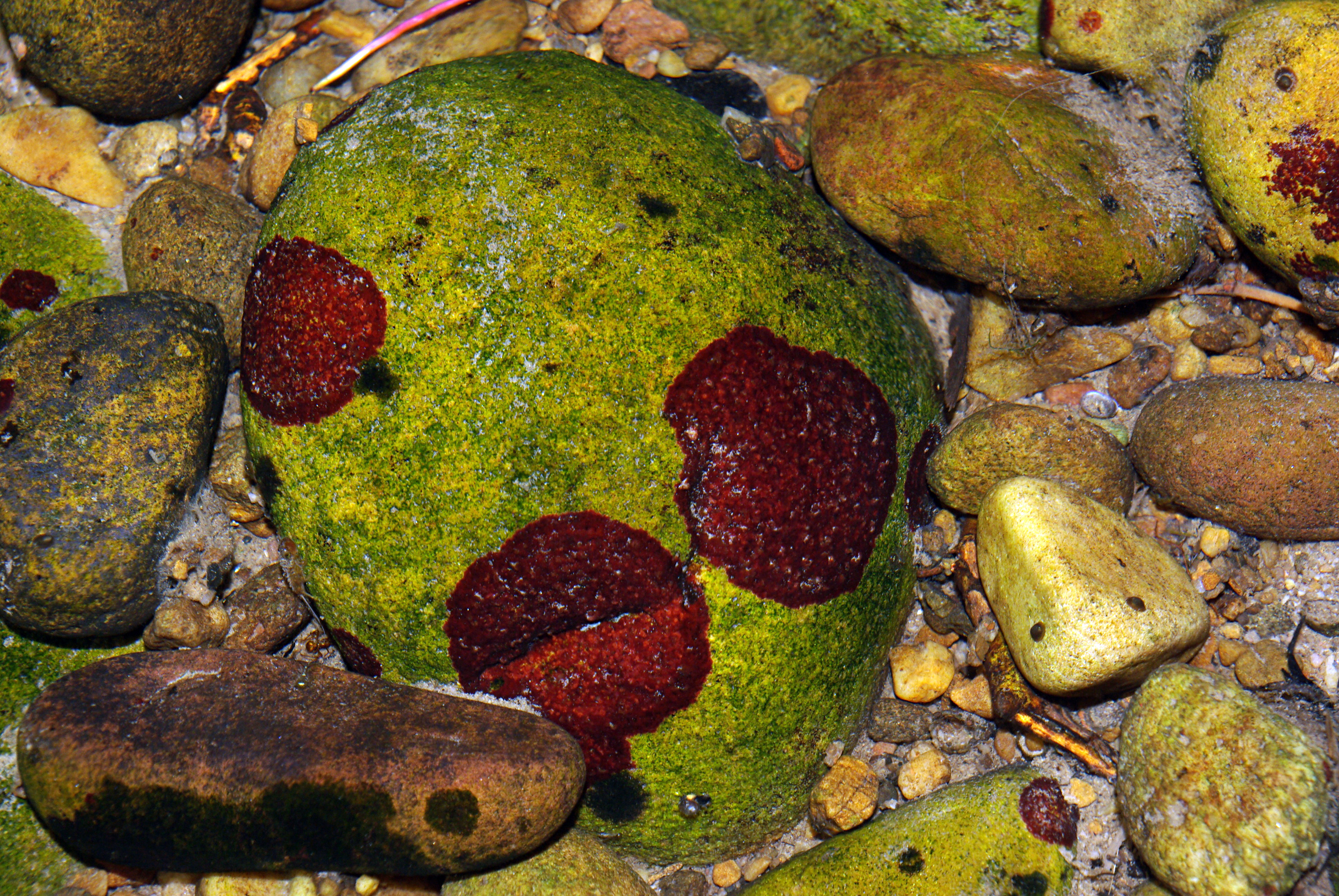
Specimens from the Porma river in Spain

Hildenbrandia rivularis is a species of freshwater red algae. It forms red, crusty thalli on stones submerged in water, typically in streams and rivers, less commonly in lakes and brackish parts of seas. It occurs in scattered locations on almost all continents. The species was formerly considered an indicator of clean or slightly polluted waters. The scientific genus name is sometimes spelled in various orthographic variants, especially as Hildenbrandtia. The life cycle of this species was described by the Polish hydrobiologist Karol Starmach.

== Structure ==
=== Habit ===
The thallus is in the form of a flat crust closely adhering to the rocky substrate, giving it the appearance of a coating. It grows radially, assuming a rounded, disc-like shape. It is composed of cells arranged in tightly fused vertical rows, with weakly branching. The lower layer of the thallus adheres to the substrate, without forming rhizoids. The upper layer of the thallus is smooth. The filaments of the vegetative thallus are strongly fused and difficult to separate. Forms similar to transections may develop at the edges of the thallus. The color is blood-red (from pink to burgundy), with a brownish hue in winter. Growth in thickness is limited, making it impossible to distinguish annual growth layers.

Compared to other freshwater red algae, it exhibits relatively low phenological variability, while its eco-physiological parameters and reproductive intensity vary depending on seasonal conditions.

=== Anatomy ===
Anatomical features are quite variable. Initially, it was thought to be geographic variability, but in reality, the same variability occurs within local populations. Cells are approximately cylindrical to spherical. Individual cells contain single chloroplasts. Cells in different parts of the thallus have uneven sizes, varying even twofold, especially in the case of branching. The average size of cells is 8.4 × 8.6 μm, the average length of filaments is 38.4 μm, and the average thickness of the basal layer is 5.5 μm in the typical form, while in the variety distinguished by slightly darker coloration – Hildenbrandia rivularis var. drescheri Lingelsh. 1922 – these dimensions are respectively: 6.0 × 6.4 μm, 52.8 μm, 9.2 μm. Despite these differences, molecular studies do not indicate distinctiveness of this variety, and specimens classified as the species H. rivularis (at least those from Europe and the Canary Islands) show relatively low genetic variability compared to other traditionally recognized species of this genus. Despite the vivid red color of the entire thallus, individual cells may appear light green.

=== Similar species ===
The most similar species is another freshwater representative of the genus – Hildenbrandia angolensis. The range of anatomical dimensions of these two species overlaps, but on average, the cells of H. angolensis are smaller. A similar range of cell sizes is also found in the freshwater Hildenbrandia cuprea. Its colonies form a crustose mat and are brick-red, while colonies of H. rivularis form a crustose, vivid red biofilm. Sometimes, the thalli of both species can be very similar to each other.

It may be confused with other algae forming crustose thalli on rocks, such as the brown algae Heribaudiella fluviatilis. In saline waters, including the entire Baltic Sea, its variants are usually other species of Hildenbrandia (especially Hildenbrandia rubra), although it may co-occur with them in the brackish Bothnian Bay.

== Reproduction ==
The explanation of the life cycle of Hildenbrandia rivularis is considered one of Karol Starmach's most important discoveries.

Freshwater species are exceptional within the genus Hildenbrandia because they do not produce tetraspores and reproduce exclusively asexually. This applies not only to Hildenbrandia rivularis but also to Hildenbrandia angolensis. Karol Starmach hypothesized that the reproductive organs homologous to the tetrasporangia of other Hildenbrandia species are its gemmae, but this hypothesis has not been confirmed. Likewise, the presence of true tetrasporangia and the production of tetraspores reported in the 1950s have not been confirmed.

According to observations by Starmach from the late 1920s, bright spots appear on the upper side of the thallus of Hildenbrandia rivularis, which then grow into nodules and warts covered with a layer of mucus. For several decades, phycologists did not know their function. Theories were proposed that they could be antheridia or oogonia with trichogynes. In the late 1940s and early 1950s, Starmach conducted observations and experiments involving these structures, proving that they are gmmae. The gemmae consist of short (usually eight-celled) filaments arranged side by side, noticeably thicker than the filaments of the parent thallus (5–12 μm) and are relatively easy to separate. During their growth, their cells fill with starch at the expense of the space occupied by chloroplasts and swell. Their exterior becomes mucilaginous. Due to the compact arrangement of the filaments of the parent thallus, swelling causes the filaments to grow and protrude outward from the thallus. Mature gemmae are nodules with a diameter of up to 1 mm. These structures occur on the thallus year-round but develop most intensively in warm months, often when water levels are low, allowing rocks with thalli to protrude above the water. The gemmae detach, leaving small depressions in the thallus, and are carried away by the current. Upon contact with a substrate, they settle on it, adhere with mucus, and after two days, develop rhizoids emerging from several basal cells. These rhizoids do not contain chloroplasts. Under favorable conditions, some rhizoids branch, and new chloroplast-containing cells develop at their tips, giving rise to new thalli. In unfavorable conditions, such as winter, this process takes several weeks. After a few more days, the cells of the gemmae die, as do the older parts of the rhizoids, and the newly formed thalli grow radially on the substrate. The development of new crustose thalli requires the apex cell of the rhizoid to come into contact with a hard substrate, while on a soft substrate, filaments that do not form typical thalli develop. In such cases, a form resembling Chantransia may rarely appear, which over time may transform into a typical thallus.

Gemmae and thallus fragments usually flow downstream, and upstream transport likely occurs through animals such as leeches or Chironomidae's larvae.

Reproduction through thallus fragmentation, i.e., the regeneration of a new thallus from a piece of old thallus not being a gemma, also occurs but is less common in natural conditions. In such cases, rhizoids or thread-like forms resembling Chantransia may not form.

Another relatively rare form of vegetative reproduction is the formation of filaments resembling stolons, on which new thalli develop at the ends. These stolons have been described as Chantransia hildenbrandtiae.

== Ecology and occurrence ==
=== Distribution ===
The species is freshwater, although it also occurs in the most brackish waters of the Baltic Sea – the Bothnian Bay and its surroundings (Archipelago Sea). Its presence has been recorded in almost the whole of Europe, including the Caucasus, the basin of the Caribbean Sea, eastern Asia, the Congo Basin, eastern Australia, and New Zealand. Records in North America may actually refer to Hildenbrandia angolensis.

In some 20th-century sources, it was considered a common species in Poland, especially in the north and in the Carpathian Mountains. According to other studies, it occurs in scattered locations in Poland – mainly in Pomerania, less frequently in the Beskids, and until the 21st century, it was almost unheard of in central Poland. Since then, additional occurrences have been noted, and it can now be found in almost every part of Poland. In the 21st century, apart from the northern, western, and mountainous parts of Poland, it has been recorded in isolated locations. During this period, there has been a multiple increase in the number of known habitats, accompanied by the disappearance of historical mountain habitats.

=== Autecology ===
Lithophyte, a component of the phytobenthos, has a relatively broad ecological tolerance, although it prefers swiftly flowing rivers with relatively clean water. It favors shaded areas but can also occur in sun-exposed locations. The crusty shape of its thallus allows it to fit into the boundary layer, where the current has less effect. Hildenbrandia more often covers the parts of rocks facing the current. It grows in waters with various flow velocities, averaging 32 cm/s, which qualifies it as a rheophile. However, it is also found in slower-flowing and stagnant waters. The presence of hard, mineral substrate is crucial for the settling and development of Hildenbrandia. Therefore, it often occurs on knickpoints, boulders, gravel, as well as on artificial substrates like the infrastructure of watermills. It can also settle on seashells or glass. Swift flow promotes water self-purification, especially from easily oxidizable organic pollutants, thus Hildenbrandia rivularis is considered an saprobic system for clean waters: xenosaprobic and oligosaprobic. It is somewhat less sensitive to excess minerals, tolerating elevated nitrogen content but not high phosphorus content. It occurs over a wide range of specific electrolytic conductivity (a measure of dissolved mineral substances). It is found in waters with a slightly acidic to slightly alkaline pH, although it is more common in alkaline waters, hence it is described as an alkaliphile. This preference is also associated with hard water. Despite this, it tends to cover acidic rocks with low calcium content, although it is also found in limestone quarries. In alpine streams, it dominates warm waters in the summer – both nutrient-poor and calcium-rich. It is a eurythermic species but prefers warm waters.

It can also occur in stagnant waters. In such an environment, it prefers shaded areas with fairly strong wave action. In Lake Constance, it was recorded at depths of 8–45 m, and in Lake Garda, even up to 90 m.

=== Bioindicators ===
Freshwater red algae, including Hildenbrandia rivularis, are considered bioindicators of water cleanliness. However, among them, it is recognized as a species relatively tolerant to pollution. In German literature, it falls into categories of indicators for fertile waters: meso-eutrophic or eu-politrophic and β-mesosaprobic, indicating moderately polluted waters. As a trophic indicator, it has relatively low significance, but as a saprobic system, it holds relatively high importance. In those types of watercourses where it is significant as an indicator, it is classified as a non-diatom phytobenthos species in category B, meaning it is less sensitive than taxa requiring the best environmental conditions. In Poland, it is taken into account when determining the River Macrophyte Index, with values of W=6 (indicating a preference for mesotrophic waters) and L=2 (indicating an average tolerance range). Due to its broader ecological tolerance than previously believed, its bioindicative value is questioned.

=== Interspecies interactions and phytosociology ===
Occupying habitats where it is difficult for other organisms to settle allows Hildenbrandia rivularis to avoid competition, although its ecological niche may overlap with that occupied by Heribaudiella fluviatilis. It happens that specimens of this species overgrow Hildenbrandia individuals. Mosses such as Leptodictyum riparium, Fontinalis antipyretica, Hygroamblystegium tenax, or Rhynchostegium confertum, as well as lichens like Verrucaria elaeomelaena or Verrucaria rheitrophila, may also occur in similar habitats. It relatively often occurs near habitats of yellow water-lily, arrowhead, and crisp-leaved pondweed.

The surface of Hildenbrandia thallus is colonized by various epiphytic organisms, such as the diatom Cocconeis lineata. Thalli may be grazed upon by insect larvae (e.g., chironomids) or snails, but this phenomenon usually does not cause significant damage.

The plant community formed by Hildenbrandia rivularis is referred to as the Hildenbrandietum rivularis phytoassociation (Luther 1954). It was also described as the non-rank association Hildenbrandia-Lithoderma (Fritsch 1929), redefined as the Hildenbrandio rivularis-Heribaudielletum fluviatilis (Fritsch 1929 corr. Täuscher). It belongs to the class of crustose communities or mats of epilithic algae Lemaneetea. In another system, the Rheithrophilo-Hildenbrandietum phytoassociation is distinguished, composed of Hildenbrandia rivularis, Verrucaria rheitrophila, and cyanobacteria such as Chamaesiphon polonicus and Chamaesiphon fuscus.

Exceptionally, Hildenbrandia rivularis can occupy habitats typical for marine species, such as Hildenbrandia rubra. This occurs in the most freshwater areas of the Baltic Sea (Bothnian Bay).

== Threats and preservation ==
In Poland, Hildenbrandia rivularis has been under species protection since 2004 (as one of the few algae species outside the charales group). It is listed on the red list of algae in Poland with a status of V – vulnerable species. It is also included in the red book of plants of Belarus. In the red list of Finland in 2019, it was classified as NT – near-threatened species.

Being a shade-tolerant species, its habitats are threatened by the cutting of riparian forests.

The habitat of Hildenbrandia rivularis on a hundred-meter stretch of stream in the Ślęża Landscape Park has been established as a natural monument called Red Algae (Polish: Krasnorost).

== Systematics and origins ==
It is assumed that its ancestors were marine algae. According to initial hypotheses, the transition to freshwater occurred in the Tertiary period or earlier. Another hypothesis suggested that various subpopulations originated from multiple independent transitions of the marine form to inland water. In the case of populations in the Baltic Sea basin, this would only be possible after the retreat of the glacier, i.e., during the Holocene. The parent species could be Hildenbrandia rubra, which inhabits transitional waters in the Baltic Sea, among other places. With multiple invasions, genetic differentiation of European subpopulations could be expected, stemming from different parent populations. However, in reality, populations of Hildenbrandia rivularis are very homogeneous, suggesting that there was a single invasion from saltwater. Furthermore, genetic distinctiveness from marine species indicates that it has a history predating the end of the Weichselian glaciation.

Hildenbrandia rivularis shows low genetic variability, which may result from the fact that it reproduces only asexually. For several decades, a variety called Hildenbrandia rivularis var. drescheri (Lingelsheim 1922) was distinguished, with Ligota Wielka near Otmuchów as its type locality. In phycological tradition, such distinguished varieties are treated almost on par with separate species. This variety has slightly larger cells and a darker shade. Molecular studies do not indicate the distinctiveness of this taxon, and since 2003, it has not been distinguished. Based on morphological and ecological differences, a subspecies occurring in the Mecsek mountains, Hildenbrandia rivularis subsp. chalikophila (Palik 1961), was distinguished, initially described as a separate species, Hildenbrandia chalikophila (Palik 1957).

Both morphologically and genetically, the most similar are two other species of freshwater Hildenbrandia: Hildenbrandia angolensis and Hildenbrandia cuprea. The latter species was recognized for many years as a cyanobacterium under the name Pleurocapsa cuprea. Another freshwater species, Hildenbrandia ramanaginae, occurs in India but is poorly described and is not included in molecular analyses allowing for the determination of relatedness.

In addition to the genus Hildenbrandia in the family Hildenbrandiaceae, the genus Apophlaea is distinguished. However, molecular data indicate that its clade is nested within the Hildenbrandia clade, so it could be eliminated. In such a case, the family Hildenbrandiaceae would be monotypic. Moreover, subsequent taxa at higher ranks up to the level of subclass Hildenbrandiophyceae are also monotypic. Therefore, in cladistic classification systems, the family Hildenbrandiaceae is a distinct clade from other clades at the rank of subclass, emerging with them from the node Florideophycidae.

=== Name ===
The generic name in the form of Hildbrandtia was coined in 1834 by Giandomenico Nardo, commemorating the Viennese doctor of medicine and botany Hildbrandt (cui nomen venit a clarissimo doctore Hildbrandt Vindobonensi, clinico illustri, ac Botanico peritissimo). Most likely, it refers to Franz Xaver Edler von Hildenbrand (1789–1849). Hence, in the literature, from the very beginning, various versions of the name were used, such as Hildebrandtia, Hildenbrandia, Hildenbrandtia, and Hildenbrantia. The term Hildenbrandia was proposed in 1840 by Giovanni Zanardini and over time, especially since the 1950s, it became dominant (after identifying the person commemorated by this name).

The species was first scientifically described by Frederik Michael Liebmann in a work from 1838 based on holotypic specimens collected by Statsraada Hornemann in 1826 in a stream at Kongens Møller in Zealand (type locality). He then assigned it the name Erythroclathrus rivularis, noting that it refers to algae also described as Palmella rubra or Verrucaria rubra. The binomial nomenclature rivularis has a Latin origin and is often given to species associated with streams. Subsequently, the same species was described by Giovanni Zanardini as Hildenbrandia paroliniana and by Louis Alphonse de Brébisson as Hildenbrandia fluviatilis (without the required taxonomic diagnosis). In 1849, Friedrich Traugott Kützing recognized that these were the same taxa, simultaneously considering them a riverine variety of Hildebrandtia rosea, i.e., Hildenbrandtia rosea var. fluviatilis. In 1851, Jakob Georg Agardh transferred the species under the current name, then written as Hildenbrandtia rivularis.

== Cultural significance ==
By covering flintstones with a durable pink color, Hildenbrandia may have influenced the perception of places where this phenomenon occurs (e.g., Stonehenge) as magical.
