= Litothallus =

Scientific classification
- Clade: Archaeplastida
- Division: Rhodophyta
- Class: Florideophyceae
- Order: Hildenbrandiales (?)
- Genus: †Litothallus
- Species: †L. ganovex

Binomial name
- †Litothallus ganovex Bomfleur et al, 2009

Extinct genus of plants

Litothallus is a genus of non-marine thalloid organism found in overbank deposits from the Triassic of Antarctica. It looks a bit like Hildenbrandia, and was composed of up to 15 layers of non-mineralized cellular sheets.
