= Ballantine scale =

Marine biology measurement scale

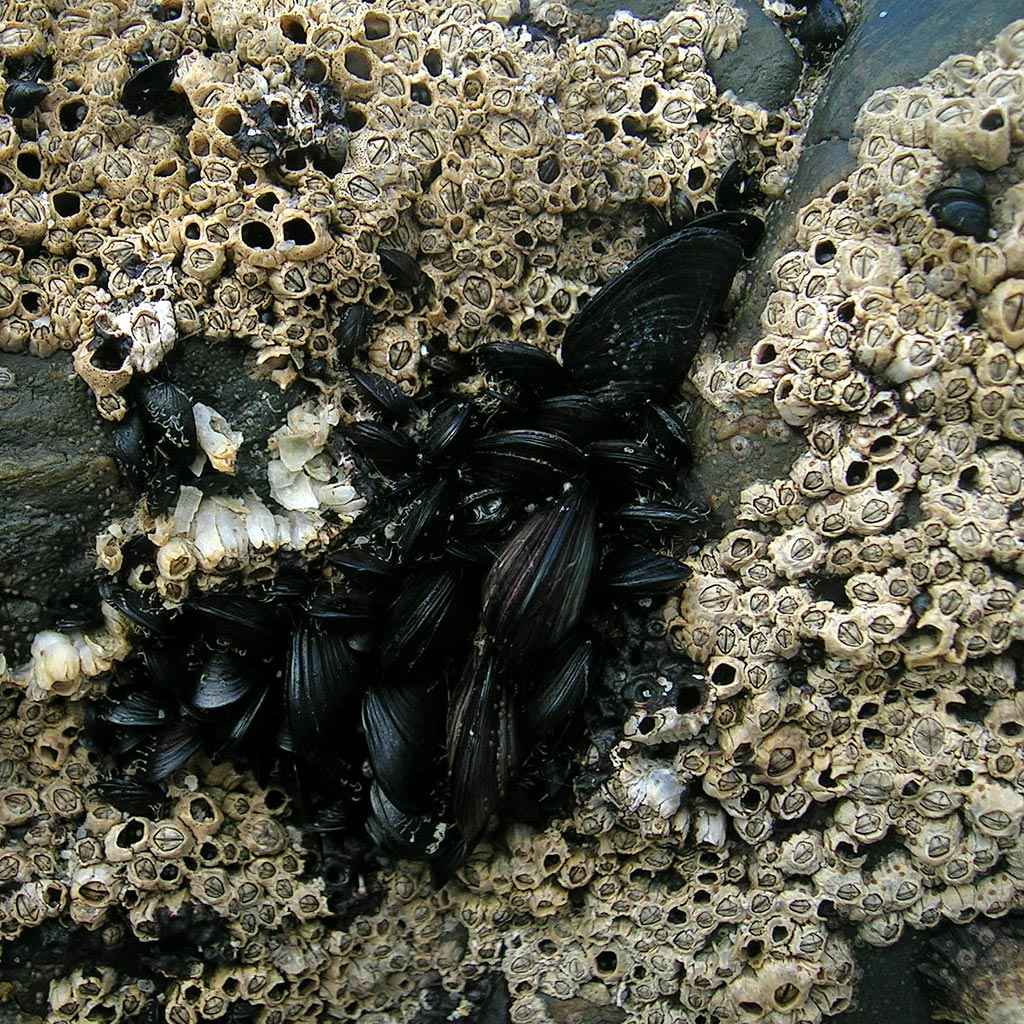
Semibalanus balanoides, a species of acorn barnacle, Ballantine's main indicator of a medium exposure in the mid-littoral zone.

The Ballantine scale is a biologically defined scale for measuring the degree of exposure level of wave action on a rocky shore. Devised in 1961 by W. J. Ballantine, then at the zoology department of Queen Mary College, London, the scale is based on the observation that where shoreline species are concerned "Different species growing on rocky shores require different degrees of protection from certain aspects of the physical environment, of which wave action is often the most important." The species present in the littoral zone therefore indicate the degree of the shore's exposure.

== Summary ==
An abbreviated summary of the scale is given below. The scale runs from 1) an "extremely exposed" shore, to 8) an "extremely sheltered" shore. The littoral zone generally is the zone between low and high tides. The supra-littoral is above the barnacle line.

| Scale unit | Name | Environment | Species |
|---|---|---|---|
| 1 | Extremely exposed | Continuous heavy surf | Infra-littoral: Alaria dominant.; Mid-littoral:Himanthalia, Gigartina, Chthamalus dominant.; Supra-littoral: dense Porphyra, lichens abundant. |
| 2 | Very exposed | "Workable only on calm days" | Infra-littoral: Alaria less frequent to common, Laminaria digitata dominant.; Mid-littoral: scattered Himanthalia, Gigartina; Chthamalus abundant and dominant;Balanus balanoides frequent to common.; Supra-littoral: scattered Porphyra. |
| 3 | Exposed | Occasional full Atlantic storm-waves | Infra-littoral: Laminaria dominant.; Mid-littoral: B. balanoides dominant on lower half; Chthamalus on upper with Patella aspera; Patella vulgata abundant over whole.; Supra-littoral: top shells absent. Nucella on upper rock, Mytilus in crevices. |
| 4 | Semi-exposed | Obvious "reduction in wave action" | Infra-littoral: Laminaria abundant.; Mid-littoral: Chthamalus, B. balanoides, Fucus serratus, P. vulgata common.; Supra-littoral: occasional Gibbula umbiliacus, Nucella on open rock. |
| 5 | Fairly sheltered | | |
| 6 | Sheltered | | |
| 7 | Very sheltered | | |
| 8 | Extremely sheltered | | |

== Modifications to the scale ==
A modified exposure scale of five stages applying to the shores of the British Isles is given by Lewis (1964):

1. "Very exposed shores" have a wide Verrucaria zone entirely above the upper tide level, a Porphyra zone above the barnacle level and Lichina pygmaea is locally abundant. The eu-littoral zone is dominated by barnacles and limpets with a coralline belt in the very low littoral along with other Rhodophyta and Alaria in the upper sub-littoral.
2. "Exposed shores" show a Verrucaria belt mainly above the high tide, with Porphyra and L. pygmaea. The mid shore is dominated by barnacles, limpets and some Fucus. Some Rhodophyta . Himanthalia and some Rhodophyta such as Mastocarpus and Corallina are found in the low littoral, with Himanthalia, Alaria and L. digitata dominant in the upper sub-littoral.
3. "Semi-exposed shores" show a Verrucaria belt just above high tide with clear Pelvetia in the upper-littoral and F. serratus in the lower-littoral. Limpets, barnacles and short F. vesiculosus mid-shore. F. serratus with Rhodophyta, (Laurencia, Mastocarpus stellatus, Rhodymenia and Lomentaria). Laminaria, Saccorhiza polyschides and small algae are common in the sub-littoral.
4. "Sheltered shores" show a narrow Verrucaria zone at high water and a full sequence of fucoids: Pelvetia, F. serratus, F. spiralis, F. vesiculosus, Ascophyllum nodosum. L. digitata is dominant in the upper sublittoral.
5. "Very sheltered shores" show a very narrow zone of Verrucaria, the dominance of the littoral by a full sequence of the fucoids and Ascophyllum covering the rocks. Laminaria saccharina, Halidrys, Chondrus and / or Furcellaria.
