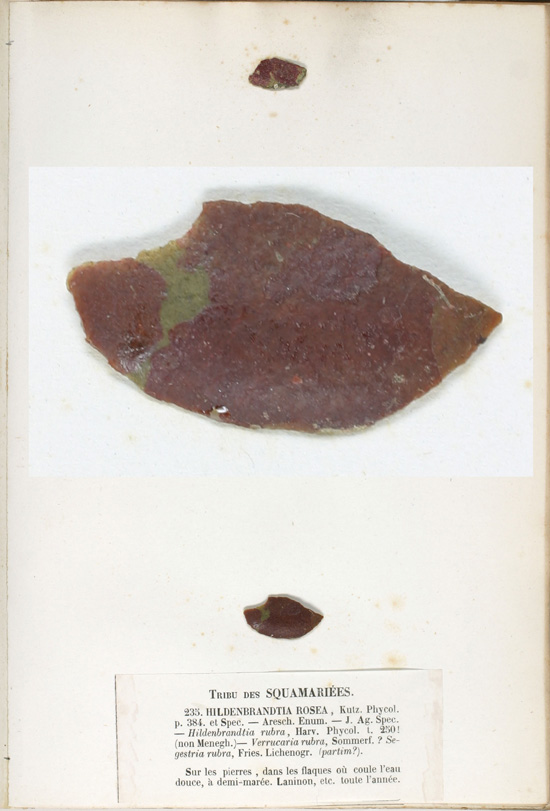

Scientific classification
- Domain: Eukaryota
- Clade: Archaeplastida
- Division: Rhodophyta
- Class: Florideophyceae
- Order: Hildenbrandiales
- Family: Hildenbrandiaceae
- Genus: Hildenbrandia
- Species: H. rubra

Binomial name
- Hildenbrandia rubra (Sommerfelt) Meneghini, 1841

= Hildenbrandia rubra =

Species of alga

Hildenbrandia rubra is a marine species of thalloid red alga. It forms thin reddish crusts on rocks and pebbles in the intertidal zone and the shallow subtidal zone. It is a common species with a cosmopolitan distribution, and is able to tolerate a wide range of conditions.

== Description ==
This alga forms patches or larger sheets of thallus less than 0.5 mm (0.02 in) thick tightly attached to the substrate. The thallus is formed from a single layer of undifferentiated cells some 3 to 6 μm in diameter, arranged in rows. The surface is smooth and flat apart from slight mounds indicating the presence of conceptacles (specialized cavities containing the reproductive organs). The colour is pinkish-red or reddish-brown.

== Distribution and habitat ==
Hildenbrandia rubra has a cosmopolitan distribution. Its range includes the northeastern Atlantic Ocean, from Spitsbergen to the Mediterranean Sea and most of the western coasts of Africa, and the northwestern Atlantic from Maine to the Caribbean Sea, and the coasts of Brazil and Uruguay. It is also present in the Indian and Pacific Oceans. It is abundant and occurs in the littoral zone and the shallow subtidal zone, on rocks and pebbles, on shell debris, under seaweeds, in crevices and in caves.

== Ecology ==
Like other algae, Hildenbrandia rubra is an autotroph, using photosynthesis to convert carbon dioxide and water into the organic compounds needed for maintenance and growth. Reproduction occurs when tetraspores that are formed in the conceptacles, mature and are released; the conceptacles grow larger each time this process occurs. Although many limpets are generalist grazers on microflora and detritus on rock surfaces, or on larger seaweeds, the giant limpet Cymbula sanguinans has a particular affinity for and dependence on Hildenbrandia rubra.

Hildenbrandia rubra is a very tolerant species, able to grow in a wide variety of salinities, temperatures and light conditions. In an experiment it was exposed successively to freezing, desiccation, low salinity and high temperature, but the rate of photosynthesis showed no long term variation; in fact it was the most tolerant species of algae of any of those tested.
