= Deronectes depressicollis =

Conservation status
- Vulnerable (IUCN 2.3)

Scientific classification
- Kingdom: Animalia
- Phylum: Arthropoda
- Class: Insecta
- Order: Coleoptera
- Suborder: Adephaga
- Family: Dytiscidae
- Genus: Deronectes
- Species: D. depressicollis

Binomial name
- Deronectes depressicollis (Rosenhauer, 1856)

Species of beetle

Deronectes depressicollis is a species of beetle in family Dytiscidae. It is endemic to Spain.
