= Phytobenthos =

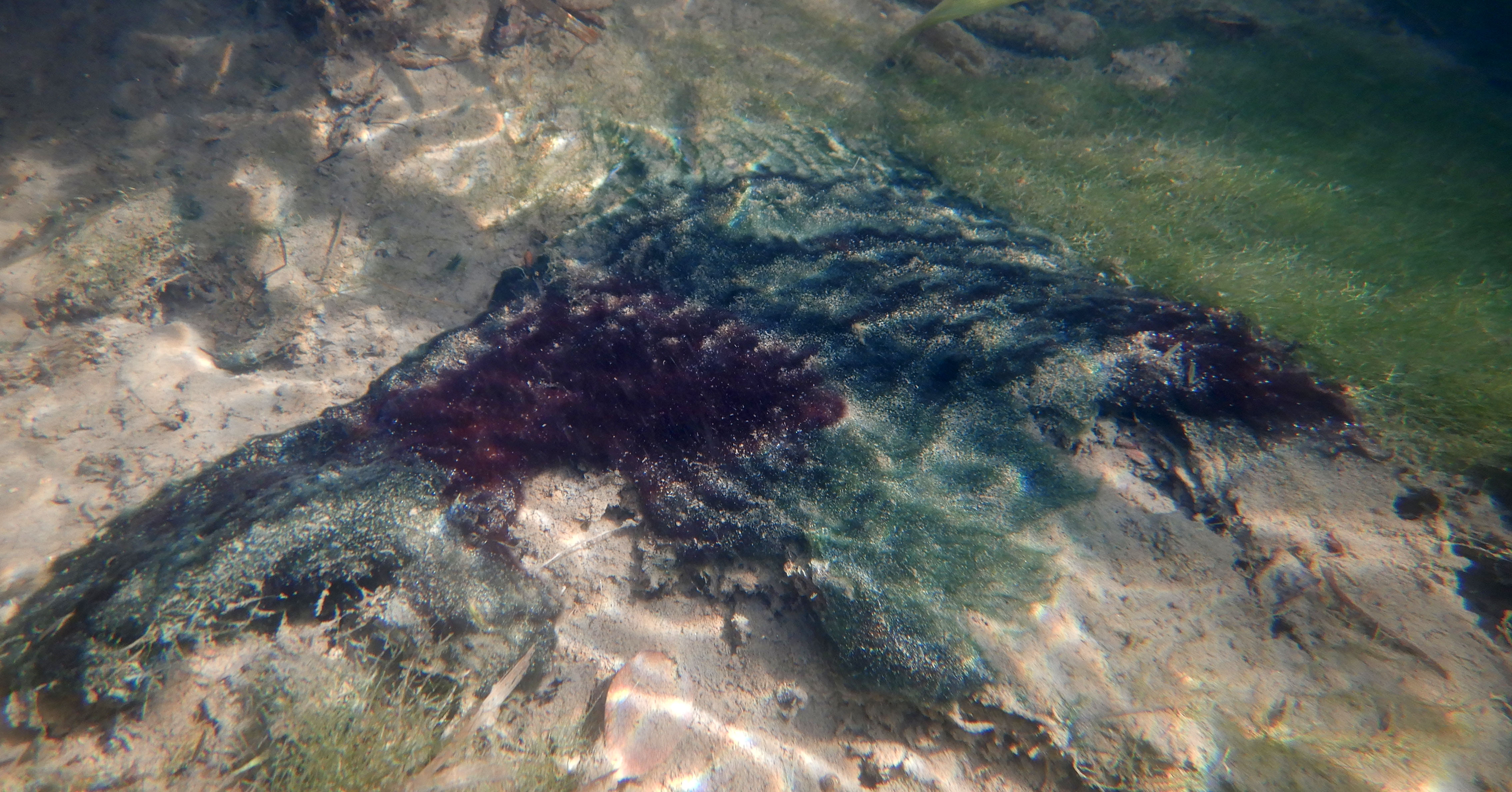
Filamentous cyanobacteria growing on an underwater surface

Phytobenthos (/.faɪtoʊˈbɛnθɒs/) (from Greek φυτόν (phyton, meaning "plants") and βένθος (benthos, meaning "depths") are autotrophic organisms found attached to bottom surfaces of aquatic environments, such as rocks, sediments, or even other organisms. This photosynthetic community includes single-celled or filamentous cyanobacteria, microalgae, and macrophytes. Phytobenthos are highly diverse, and can be found in freshwater and marine environments, as well as transitional water systems. However, their distribution and availability still depend on the factors and stressors that exist in the environment. Because phytobenthos are autotrophs, they need to be able to subsist where it is still possible to perform photosynthesis. Similar to phytoplankton, phytobenthos contribute to the aquatic food web for grazers and heterotrophic bacteria, and researchers have also been studying their health as an indicator for water quality and environmental integrity of aquatic ecosystems.

== Overview ==
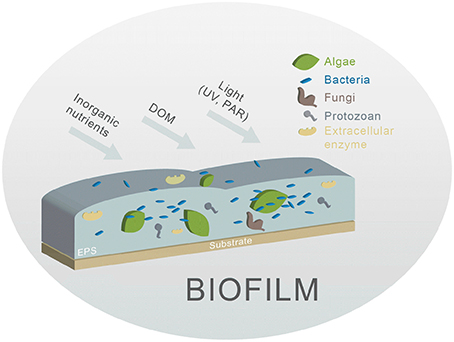
Biofilm is composed of phytobenthos as well as other eukaryotes and prokaryotes. EPS is Extracellular Polymeric Substances. DOM is Dissolved Organic Matter.

Phytobenthos are subcategorized into microphytobenthos and macrophytobenthos. Microphytobenthos such as diatoms can be as small as 0.2 μm in diameter, and macrophytobenthos such as kelps can be tens of meters long. To establish themselves on surfaces, phytobenthos usually stabilize themselves onto substrates through the use of various polysaccharides, glycoproteins, and even lipids that make up the extracellular polymeric substance, of which 40 - 90% of the carbons are derived from carbohydrates. Some species of phytobenthos such as Ostreobium and diatoms such as the Synedra acus Kütznig have been observed to live in a free-living state. Benthic diatoms have been found to be useful indicator species for determining the state of the aquatic environment as many study models have demonstrated association between the type of diatom communities that are present and the stability and the size of the sediments. Non-diatom phytobenthos such as the cyanobacteria Nostoc spp. and Phormidium spp. have also been used as biological indicators.

== Diversity ==
Phytobenthos consist of both eukaryotic and prokaryotic communities, which can be identified by using microscopy or by performing gene sequencing with 16S rRNA (for prokaryotes) and 18S rRNA (for eukaryotes). The eukaryotic communities of phytobenthos include microalgae such as Chlorophyceae, Bacillariophyceae, Cryptophyceae, and Chrysophyceae. In the marine environment, some additional representative populations include Rhodophyta, which has been reportedly found in intertidal regions. The prokaryotic communities of phytobenthos are composed primarily of filamentous cyanobacteria, some of which have been identified to be capable of producing hepatotoxins.

== Habitats ==
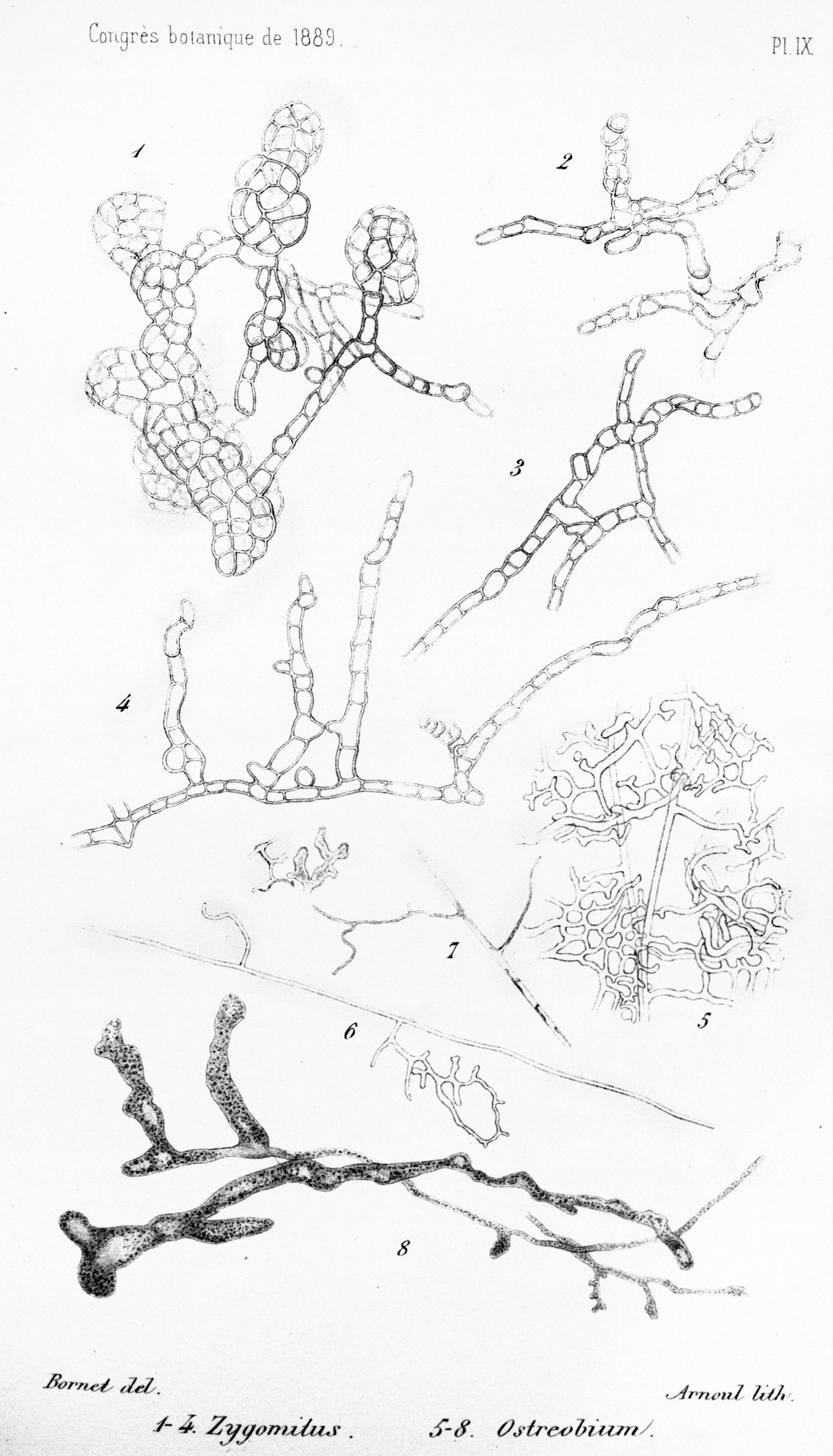
Ostreobium quekettii lives inside corals

Depending on the type of substrates to which the phytobenthos is attached, they would be considered as epilithic (growing on rocks and other manmade, artificial substances), epipelic (growing on silt), episammic (growing on sand), epiphytic (growing on other plants), or epizoic (growing on animals). Epizoic phytobenthos such as Ostreobium and Symbiodinium have also been found to grow on skeletons or within corals to which they have established symbiotic relationships by exchanging nutrients.

The phytobenthos' habitats can range from freshwater systems such as rivers and lakes to coastal regions. In the marine environment, phytobenthos can be found as far back from the shore as the subtidal zones where they are consistently submerged in water. Their productivity does not extend beyond the outer boundary of the littoral zone, the region to which sunlight can still penetrate to the bottom.

With increasing depth, there is a decline in algal cover due in part to light availability. In addition to depth, turbidity can restrict the extent of light availability, which would also impact the extent of phytobenthic growth. However, phytobenthos such as Ostreobium have demonstrated capability to adapt to low-light conditions as grow in areas as deep as 200 meters. Some diatoms also demonstrated mobility and rise to the surface during the earlier part of the year.

Other physical and chemical conditions that also determine phytobenthos distributions include flow, acidity, nutrients, temperature, and the community's composition. Water flow can determine the types and distributions of phytobenthos, especially in the stream communities where the water is constantly moving. Rivers with more steady flow contribute to the stable environment that can promote the growth of phytobenthos communities.

== Ecology ==
Phytobenthos form biofilm with other microbial populations, including heterotrophic bacteria, which can also produce extracellular polymeric substance to help establish biofilm. Within these diverse communities, phytobenthos sustains the heterotrophs and mixotrophs not only by serving as food themselves. Phytobenthos can fix organic matters as primary producers, and the extracellular polymeric substance they produced to attach themselves to surfaces can also be utilized by bacteria as another potential carbon source. The presence of consumers are not the only biotic factors driving changes to the phytobenthos composition in the community. Photosynthetic populations that demonstrate themselves to be competitive can also change the benthic community makeup. The diatom D. geminata can proliferate quickly and are readily adaptive to changes to the aquatic environment.

Researchers have assigned trophic values or indicators based on the Periphyton Index of Trophic status (PIT) to phytobenthos as another means to determine the ecological status of water bodies. Researchers have also taken into consideration of the water chemistry, richness of the community, and biomass in their studies. Depending on the site of study, researchers also account for the activities from the phytobenthos when calculating for primary productivity.

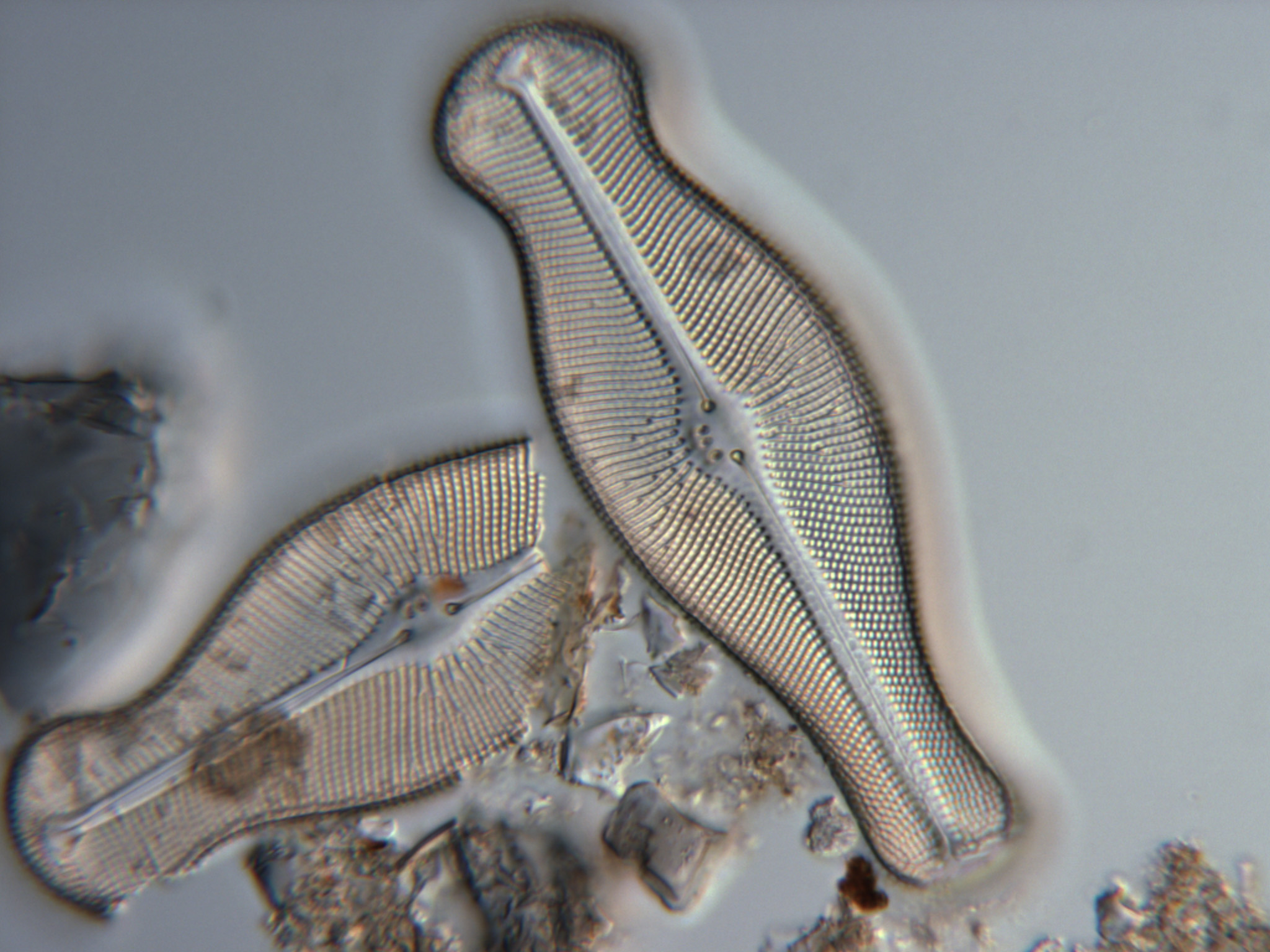
Didymosphenia geminata

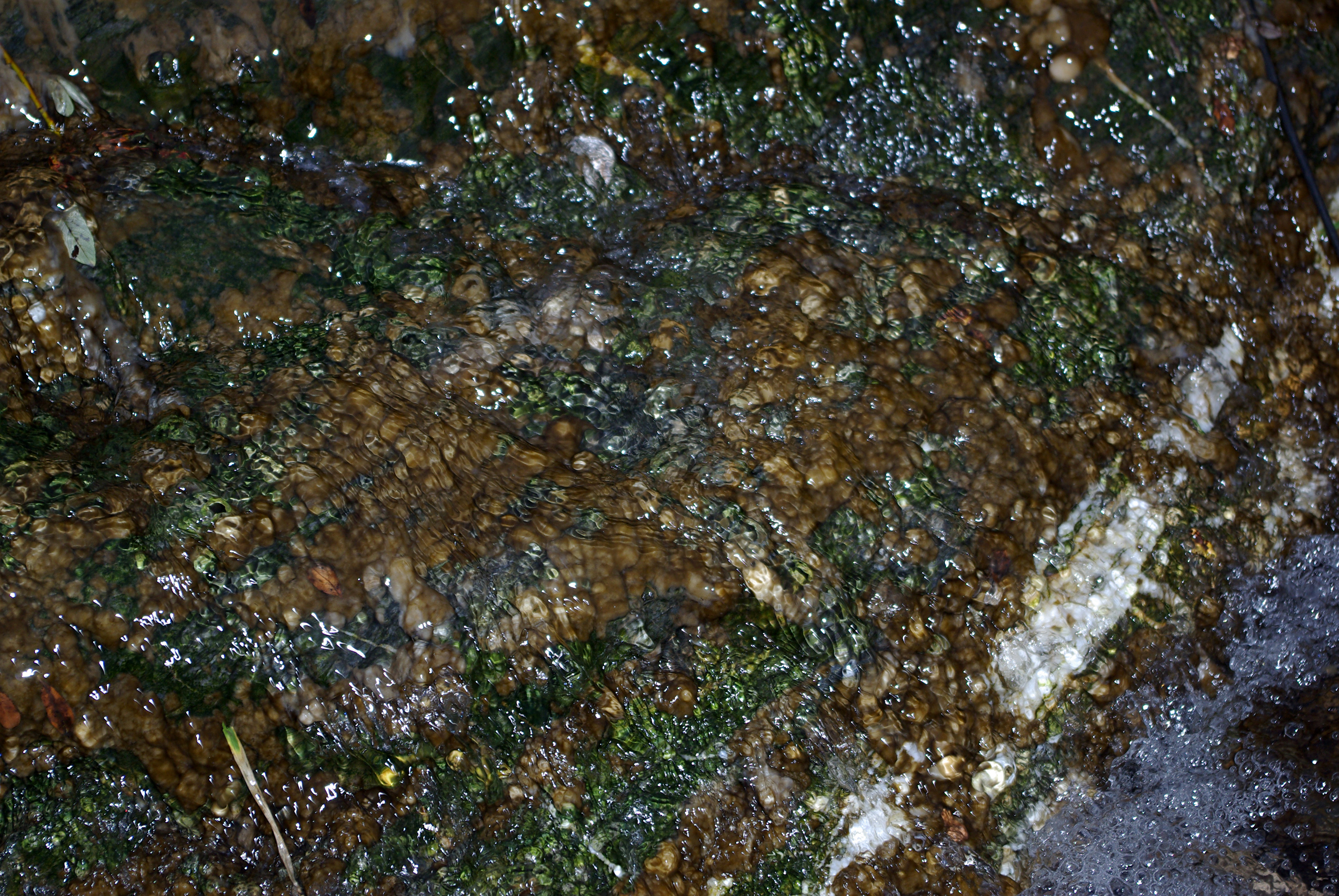
Didymosphenia geminata coverage of stream bed
