= Deronectes ferrugineus =

Conservation status
- Vulnerable (IUCN 2.3)

Scientific classification
- Kingdom: Animalia
- Phylum: Arthropoda
- Class: Insecta
- Order: Coleoptera
- Suborder: Adephaga
- Family: Dytiscidae
- Genus: Deronectes
- Species: D. ferrugineus

Binomial name
- Deronectes ferrugineus Fery & Brancucci, 1987

Species of beetle

Deronectes ferrugineus is a species of beetle in family Dytiscidae. It is endemic to Portugal.
