= Ostreobiaceae =

Scientific classification
- Kingdom: Plantae
- Division: Chlorophyta
- Class: Ulvophyceae
- Order: Bryopsidales
- Family: Ostreobiaceae; P.C. Silva

Genera
- †Ichnoreticulina; Ostreobium

Family of algae

Ostreobiaceae are a family of green algae in the order Bryopsidales.
