= Hebe Society =

New Zealand botanical organisation

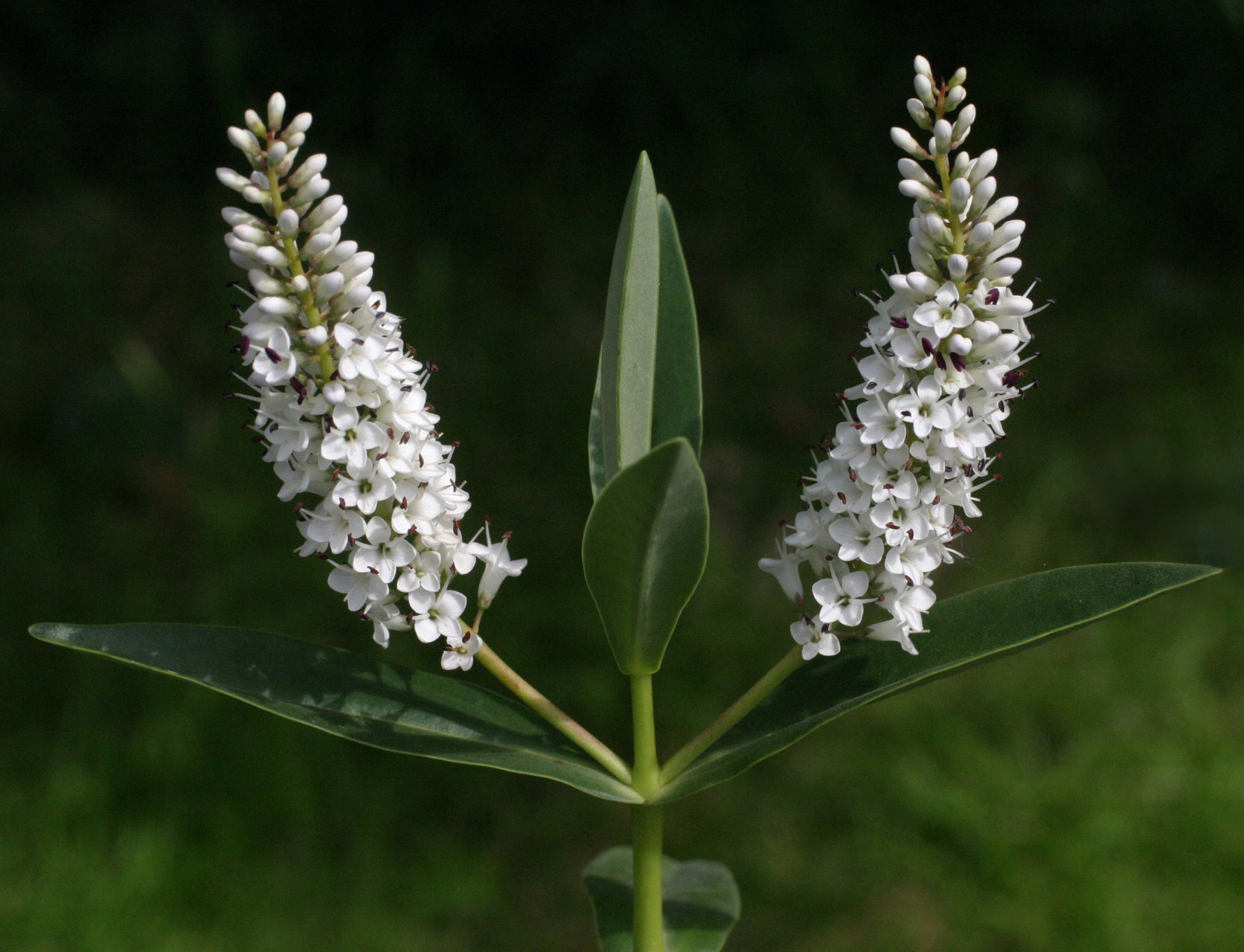
Hebe dieffenbachii at The Quinta Arboretum.

The Hebe Society promotes the cultivation and conservation of hebes and other New Zealand native plants.

It was formed in 1985 by a group of enthusiastic gardeners and nurserymen, under the auspices of the Royal Horticultural Society. The role of the society is to stimulate an interest in hebes and other New Zealand native plants. The Hebe Society is a non-profit organisation.

Most members are in the British Isles, but some are in Europe, North America and New Zealand. The Hebe Society provides members with information about familiar and less well known hebes and other New Zealand native plants, how to grow them and where they may be obtained. The society aims to ensure that all garden-worthy hebes and New Zealand plants remain in cultivation and have the widest distribution.

More information can be found on its website www.hebesociety.org

== Plant information ==
- Information on over 200 hebes
- Information on nearly 200 New Zealand native plants

== Publications ==
The Hebe Society produces a magazine, Hebe News, three times a year. It is illustrated in colour with contributions from UK and international plant enthusiasts, and contains articles on hebes and New Zealand native plants and gardens.

== Cuttings Exchange and Seed Distribution ==
Cuttings or seeds are exchanged through the quarterly magazine Hebe News. Members can obtain a variety of lesser-known plants through this exchange, helping them expand their collections of hebes and other New Zealand native plants.

== Shows ==
The society exhibits at various shows around the UK such as Hampton Court Garden Festival, RHS Specialist shows, BBC Gardeners World Plant Fairs, The Alpine Society Spring Show.

== Picture Library ==
An extensive library of slides and digital images covering a wide range of hebes and New Zealand native plants is available to members on loan.

== Collections ==
Collections of hebes are held by members in North Yorkshire, Kent and Sussex.The Lovell Quinta Arboretum, Swettenham, Cheshire.

It is British Registered Charity No 801398 and is affiliated to the Royal Horticultural Society, New Zealand Alpine Garden Society
