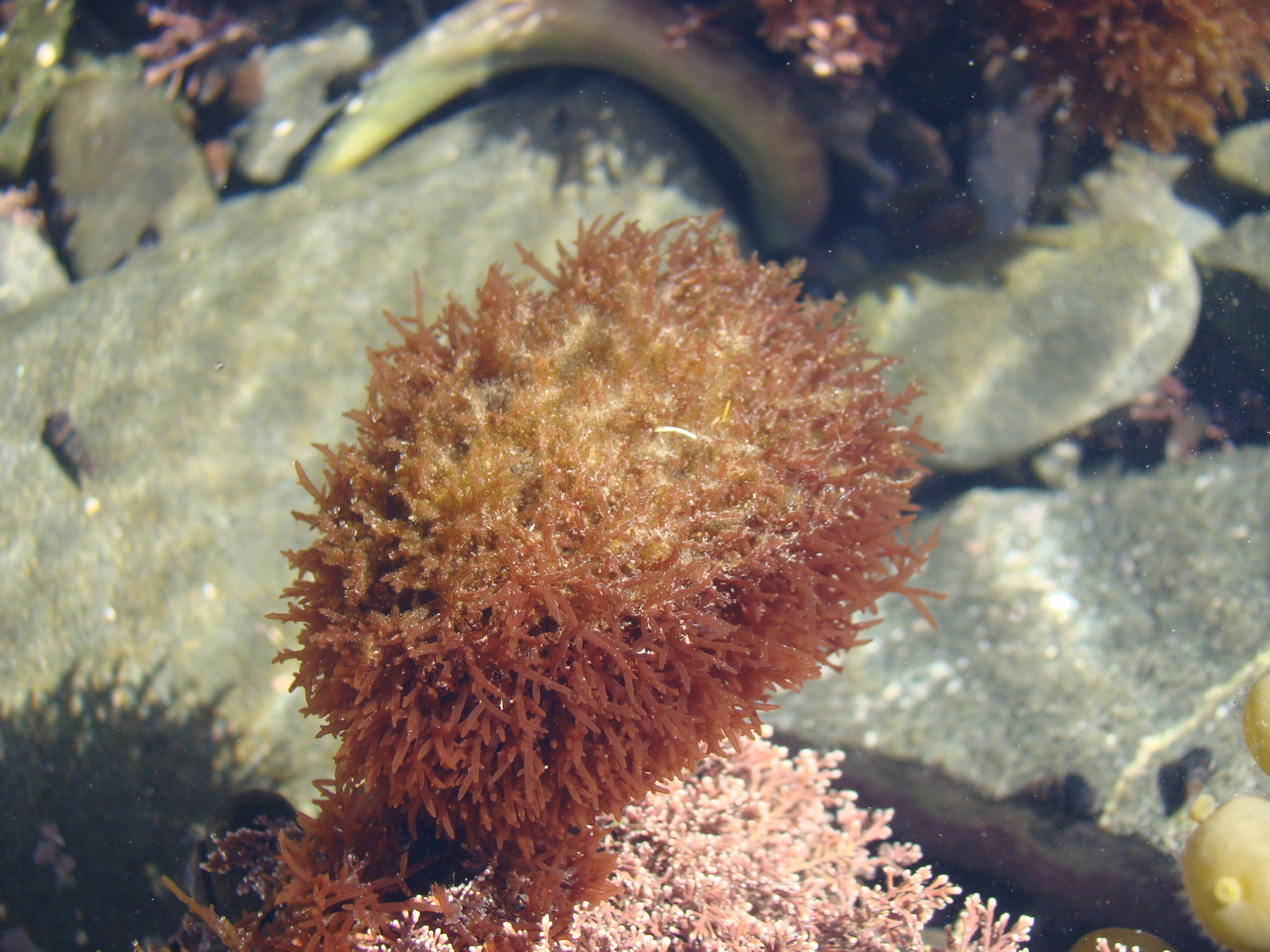

Scientific classification
- Domain: Eukaryota
- Supergroup: Archaeplastida
- Division: Rhodophyta
- Class: Florideophyceae
- Order: Rhodymeniales
- Family: Lomentariaceae
- Genus: Lomentaria
- Species: L. caespitosa

Binomial name
- Lomentaria caespitosa (Harv.) V.J.Chapm. & Dromgoole

= Lomentaria caespitosa =

Species of alga

Lomentaria caespitosa is a species of marine red algae.
