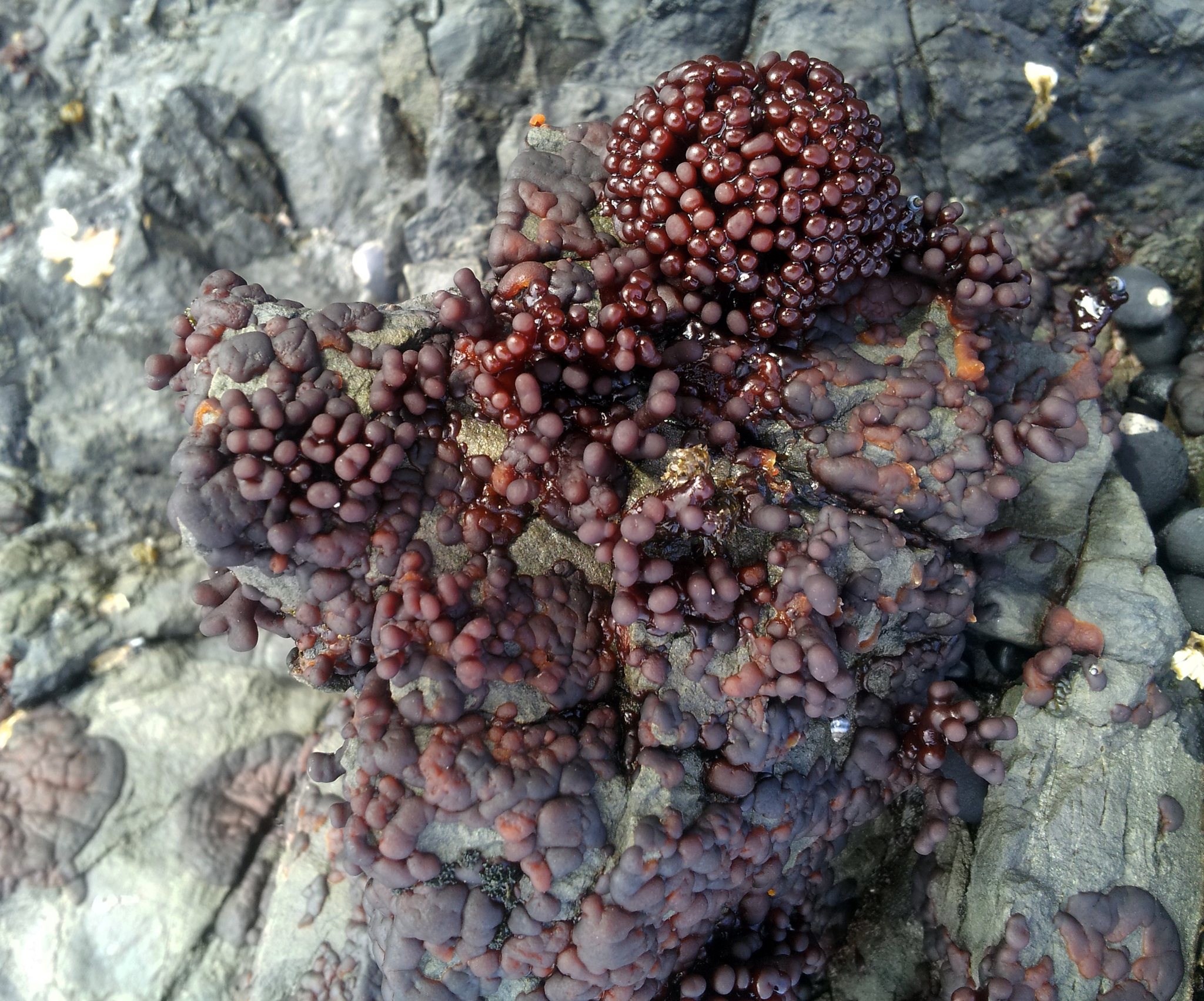
- Apophlaea sinclairii by Peter de Lange

Scientific classification
- Domain: Eukaryota
- Clade: Archaeplastida
- Division: Rhodophyta
- Class: Florideophyceae
- Order: Hildenbrandiales
- Family: Hildenbrandiaceae
- Genus: Apophlaea; J.D.Hooker & Harvey, 1845

Species
- A. sinclairii; A. lyallii

= Apophlaea =

Genus of algae

Apophlaea is a genus of thalloid algae that is endemic to New Zealand. Species in the genus are found in the high intertidal zone on New Zealand's coasts. Specimens can reach around 15 cm in size. The thalli take a crustose form, but also contain upright, branching frond-like protrusions that reach 5–8 cm in height. Secondary pit connections and secondary pit connectionsare present in the organisms. Apophlaea reproduces by means of conceptacles; it produces tetraspores.

It is notable for its symbiotic relationship with certain fungi. Despite its unusual morphology, molecular systematics, along with its zoned tetrasporangia borne in conceptacles with a single opening, place it within the Hildenbrandiales.

The algae are resistant to both U-V radiation and desiccation, allowing them to thrive in intertidal settings. Indeed, they can resume almost full photosynthesis just minutes after losing 95% of their tissue water.

== Species ==
There are three species in the genus Apophlaea:

- Apophlaea darchinoae Webby, Thorn & M.Preuss, 2022
- Apophlaea lyallii J.D.Hooker & Harvey, 1855
- Apophlaea sinclairii J.D.Hooker & Harvey, 1845
