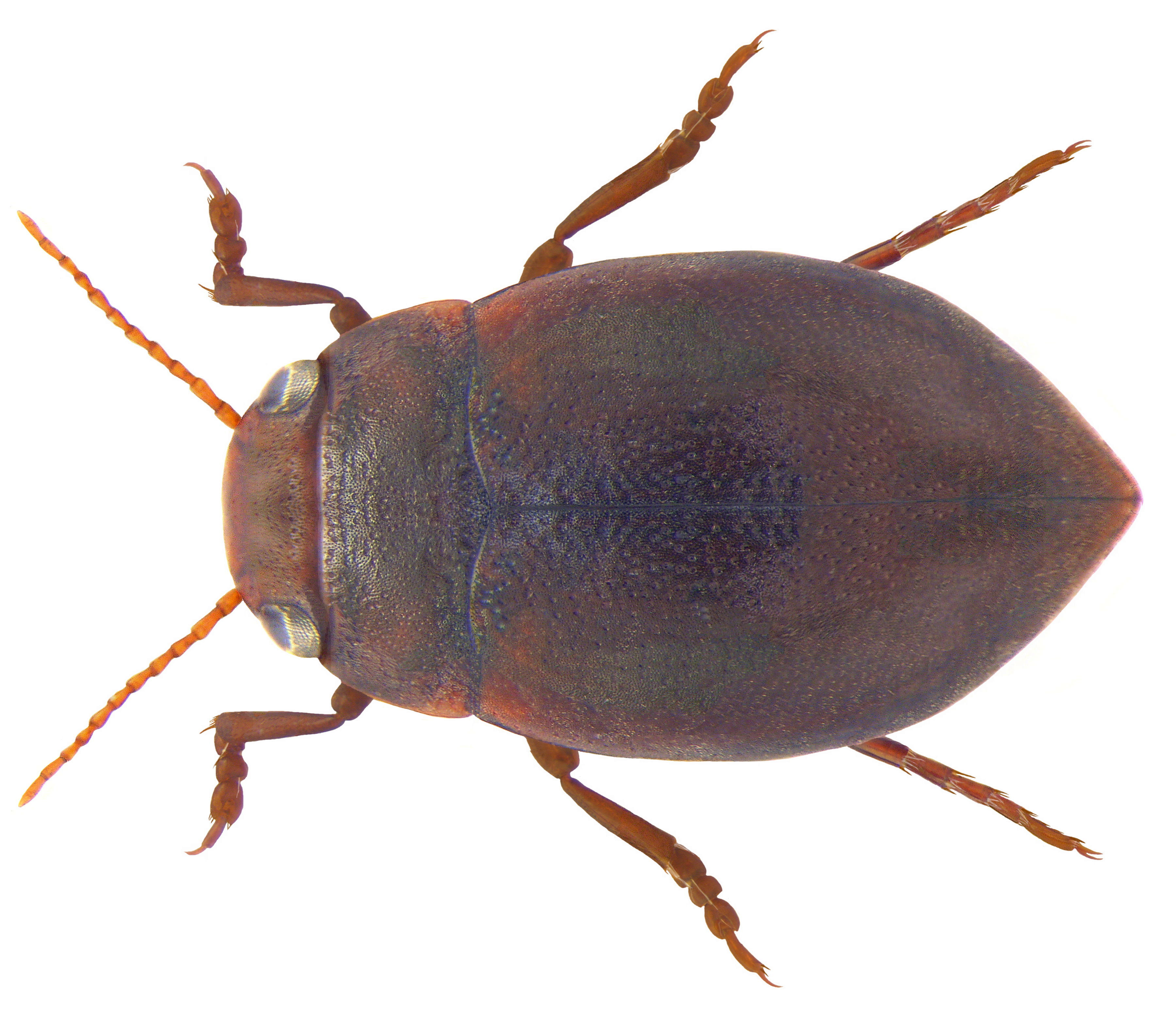
- Deronectes latus

Scientific classification
- Kingdom: Animalia
- Phylum: Arthropoda
- Class: Insecta
- Order: Coleoptera
- Suborder: Adephaga
- Family: Dytiscidae
- Tribe: Hydroporini
- Genus: Deronectes; Sharp, 1882

= Deronectes =

Genus of beetles

Deronectes is a genus of beetle in family Dytiscidae. It contains the following species:

- Deronectes abnormicollis Semenov, 1900
- Deronectes afghanicus Wewalka, 1970
- Deronectes algibensis Fery & Fresneda, 1988
- Deronectes angelinii Fery & Brancucci, 1997
- Deronectes angulipennis (Peyron, 1858)
- Deronectes angusi Fery & Brancucci, 1990
- Deronectes aubei (Mulsant, 1843)
- Deronectes balkei Fery & Hosseinie, 1998
- Deronectes bameuli Fery & Hosseinie, 1998
- Deronectes bicostatus (Schaum, 1864)
- Deronectes biltoni Fery & Hosseinie, 1998
- Deronectes brancuccii Fery & Hosseinie, 1998
- Deronectes brannanii (Schaufuss, 1869)
- Deronectes costipennis Brancucci, 1983
- Deronectes danielssoni Fery & Hosseinie, 1998
- Deronectes delarouzei (Jacquelin du Val, 1857)
- Deronectes depressicollis (Rosenhauer, 1856)
- Deronectes doriae Sharp, 1882
- Deronectes elburs Fery, Erman & Hosseinie, 2001
- Deronectes elmii Fery & Hosseinie, 1998
- Deronectes evelynae Fery & Hosseinie, 1998
- Deronectes fairmairei (Leprieur, 1876)
- Deronectes ferrugineus Fery & Brancucci, 1987
- Deronectes fosteri Aguilera & Ribera, 1996
- Deronectes hakkariensis Wewalka, 1989
- Deronectes hebauerorum Fery & Hosseinie, 1998
- Deronectes hendrichi Fery & Hosseinie, 1998
- Deronectes hispanicus (Rosenhauer, 1856)
- Deronectes jaechi Wewalka, 1989
- Deronectes kinzelbachi Fery & Hosseinie, 1998
- Deronectes lareynii (Fairmaire, 1858)
- Deronectes latus (Stephens, 1829)
- Deronectes longipes Sharp, 1882
- Deronectes moestus (Fairmaire, 1858)
- Deronectes nilssoni Fery & Wewalka, 1992
- Deronectes opatrinus (Germar, 1824)
- Deronectes palaestinensis Fery & Hosseinie, 1999
- Deronectes parvicollis (Schaum, 1864)
- Deronectes perrinae Fery & Brancucci, 1997
- Deronectes persicus Peschet, 1914
- Deronectes peyerimhoffi (Régimbart, 1906)
- Deronectes platynotus (Lacordaire, 1835)
- Deronectes riberai Fery & Hosseinie, 1998
- Deronectes roberti Fery & Hosseinie, 1998
- Deronectes sahlbergi Zimmermann, 1932
- Deronectes schuberti Wewalka, 1970
- Deronectes semirufus (Germar, 1844)
- Deronectes syriacus Wewalka, 1970
- Deronectes theryi (Peyerimhoff, 1925)
- Deronectes toledoi Fery, Erman & Hosseinie, 2001
- Deronectes vestitus (Gebler, 1848)
- Deronectes wewalkai Fery & Fresneda, 1988
- Deronectes wittmeri Wewalka, 1970
- Deronectes witzgalli Fery & Brancucci, 1997
- Deronectes youngi Fery & Hosseinie, 1998
