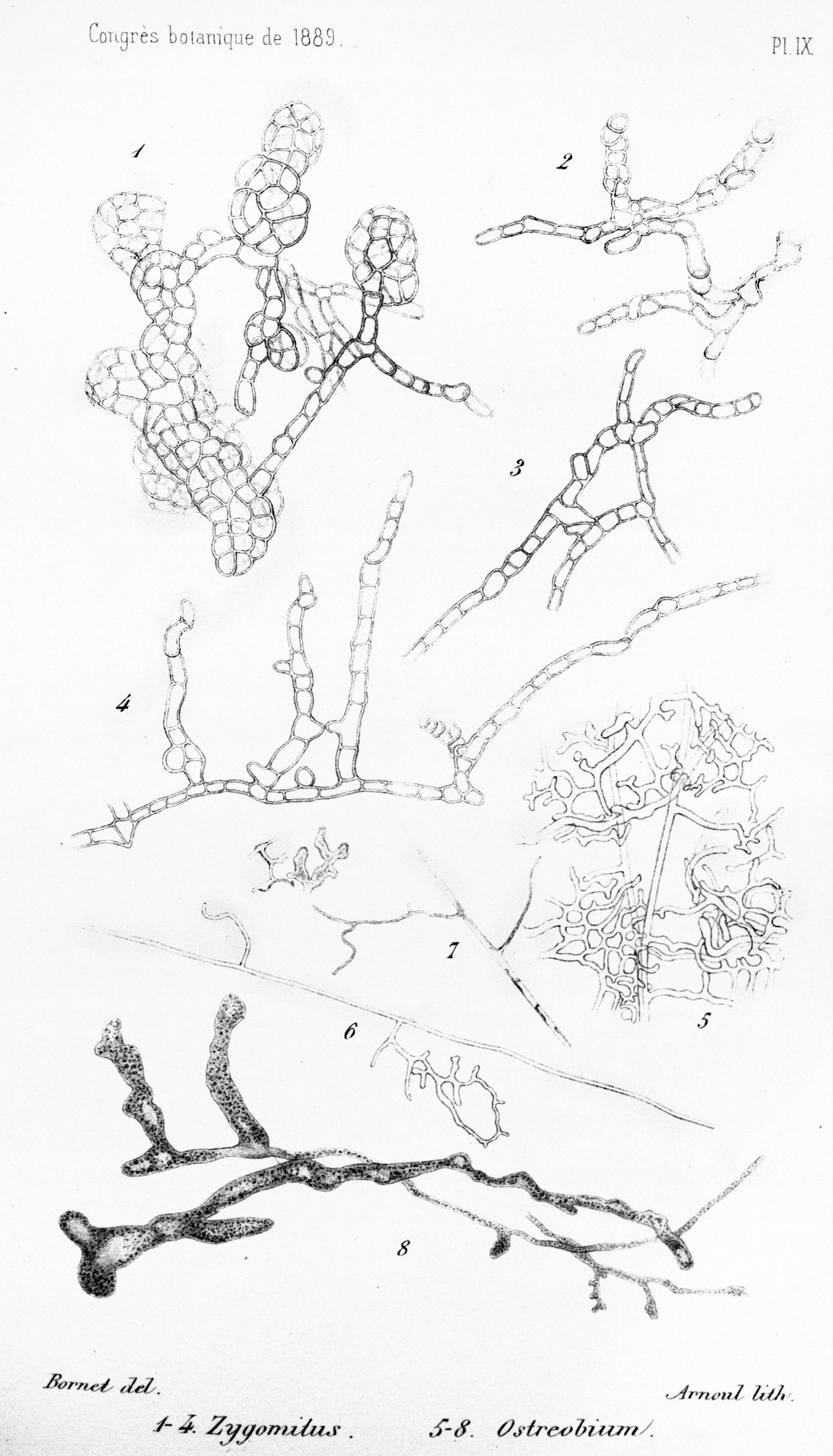
- Zygomitus reticulatus (1-4) and Ostreobium quekettii (5-8)

Scientific classification
- Kingdom: Plantae
- Division: Chlorophyta
- Class: Ulvophyceae
- Order: Bryopsidales
- Family: Ostreobiaceae
- Genus: Ostreobium; Bornet & Flahault, 1889

Type species
- Ostreobium quekettii Bornet & Flahault, 1889

Species
- Ostreobium brabantium; Ostreobium constrictum; Ostreobium quekettii

= Ostreobium =

Genus of algae

Ostreobium is a genus of green algae in the family Ostreobiaceae.

Ostreobium is best known as a symbiont of corals forming conspicuous green bands recognizable by the naked eye inside the coral skeleton. Ostreobium can supply photosynthates to the coral during coral bleaching when the symbiotic dinoflagellates that usually perform this role are expelled from the coral holobiont.

In addition to growing burrowed into calcium carbonate rocks, coral and shells and surviving on the low light that gets through the rock, Ostreobium also has been found at great depths where very few organisms can harvest enough light to subsist on photosynthesis
