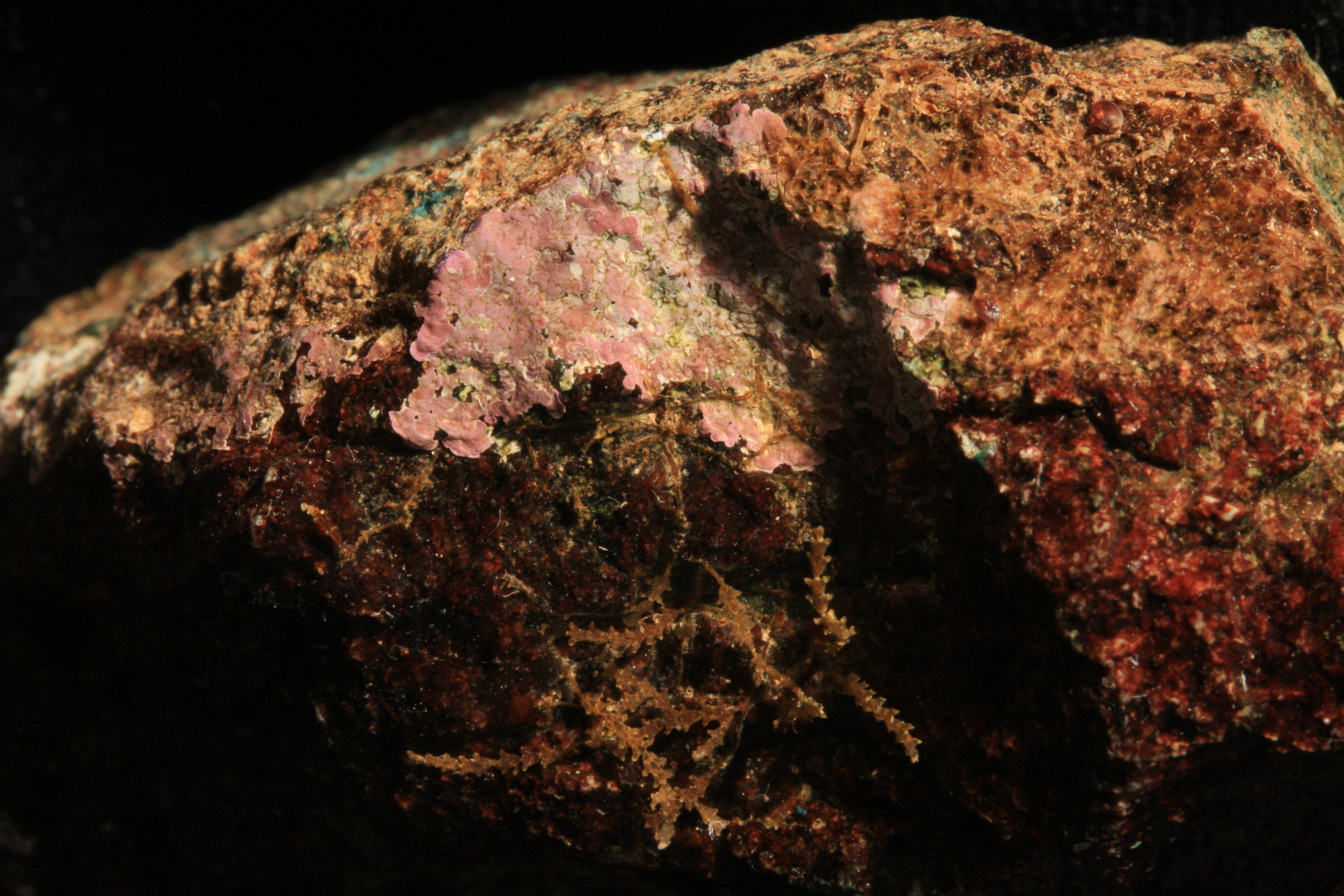
- The darker red alga encrusting this rock fragment is H. crouaniorum
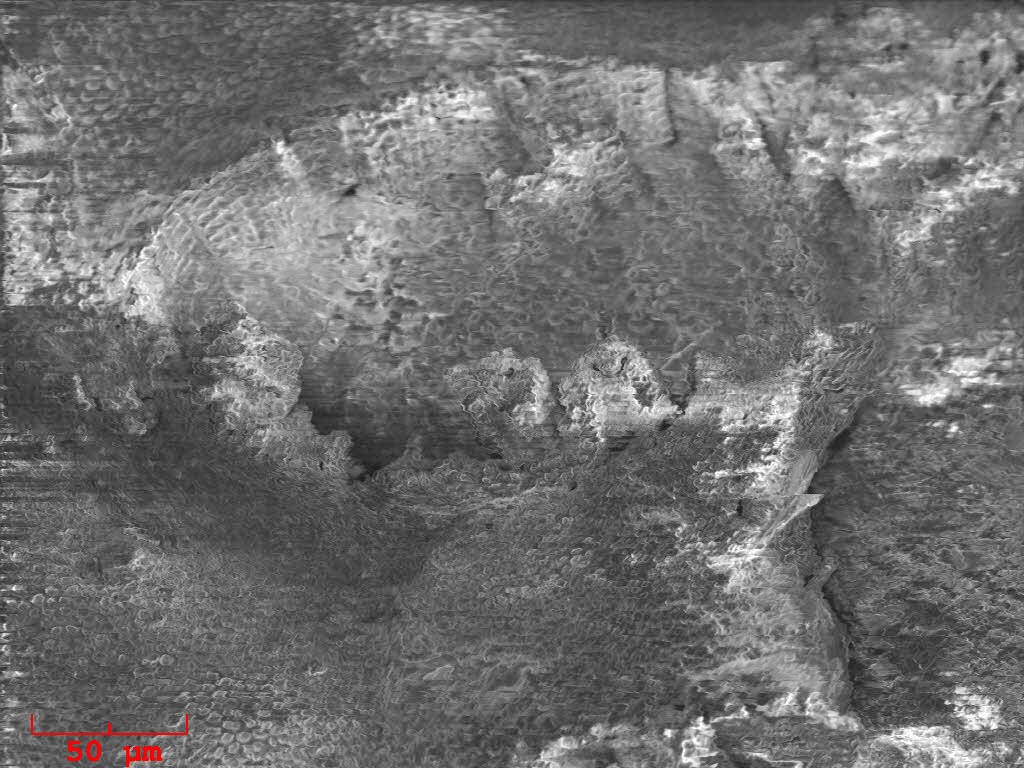
- SEM of a H. rivularis gemma. Scale bar: 50 μm

Scientific classification
- Domain: Eukaryota
- Clade: Archaeplastida
- Division: Rhodophyta
- Class: Florideophyceae
- Order: Hildenbrandiales
- Family: Hildenbrandiaceae
- Genus: Hildenbrandia; Nardo, 1834

Synonyms
- Hildenbrandtia

= Hildenbrandia =

Genus of algae

Hildenbrandia is a genus of thalloid red alga comprising about 26 species. The slow-growing, non-mineralized thalli take a crustose form. Hildenbrandia reproduces by means of conceptacles and produces tetraspores.

== Morphology ==
Hildenbrandia cells are around 3–5 μm in diameter and the filaments are around 50–75 μm in height.

The thallus comprises two layers: the hypothallus, which attaches to the rock, and the perithallus, a pseudoparenchymous layer comprising vertical filaments, which unlike coralline red algae is not further differentiated.

== Growth ==
Hildenbrandia comprises orderly layers of vertical oblong cells with thick vegetative cell walls, occasionally connected by secondary pit connections with pit plugs in the septal pores. It grows at its margins, away from the centre, and is able to quickly repair any gaps arising by regenerating from a basal layer of cells. As plants become more mature, they become multi-layered and strongly pigmented near their centres, whilst their single-layered margins begin to grow more slowly. Multi-layered areas may develop in the margins; these will detach and float away as gemmae to form new colonies, leaving a single layer of cells beneath them once they separate from the host plant.

Newly settled gemmae form rhizoids.

Conceptacles develop in a haphazard manner; cells in conceptacle regions deform one another and become less regularly shaped as they grow larger.

In a similar fashion to the coralline algae, the outer layer of the thallus is shed seasonally, presumably to avoid colonization by epiphytes.

== Taxonomy ==
The genus name of Hildenbrandia is in honour of Franz Xaver von Hildenbrand (1789-1849), who was an Austrian physician and botanist.

The genus was circumscribed by Giovanni Domenico Nardo in Isis (Oken) vol.27 on page 675 in 1834.

== Habitat ==
The freshwater species H. rivularis and H. angularis seems to form a clade, and require an alkaline pH and hard water, preferring clean water. Unlike most other freshwater red algae (which prefer running water), H. rivularis prefers still water, particularly shady lakes or ponds. H. rubra and other marine species are found in brackish waters, but freshwater / gemma-bearing species cannot tolerate even moderate salinities. The genus is often found in a symbiotic partnership with fungi. Hildenbrandia has a remarkable tolerance to stresses including extreme temperatures, desiccation, and Ultra-violet light; it can be up and photosynthesizing near full capacity just minutes after being cooled to −17 °C or subjected to extreme salinities.

== Reproduction ==
Sexual reproduction has never been observed in any Hildenbrandia species. It can reproduce by splitting into multiple colonies by fragmentation, or via stolons (i.e. sending out lateral branches) or gemmae.

Marine Hildenbrandia, on the other hand, reproduce by means of tetraspores that are produced within the thallus by conceptacles.

== Systematics ==
The genus contains these species (this list is out of date):

- H. angolensis
- H. arracana
- H. canariensis
- H. crouanii
- H. crouaniorum
- H. dawsonii
- H. deusta
- H. expansa
- H. galapagensis
- H. kerguelensis
- H. lecannellieri
- H. lithothamnioides
- H. nardiana
- H. occidentalis
- H. pachythallos
- H. patula
- H. prototypus
- H. ramanaginaii
- H. rivularis
- H. rosea
- H. rubra
- H. sanjuanensis
- H. yessoensis

As of April 2022, the GBIF only accepts 6 species; Hildenbrandia crouaniorum J.Agardh, Hildenbrandia dawsonii, Hildenbrandia occidentalis Setch., 1917, Hildenbrandia rivularis (Liebman) J.Agardh, Hildenbrandia rubra (Sommerfelt) Meneghini and Hildenbrandia sanjuanensis.

== Stonehenge ==
The presence of H. rivularis near Stonehenge has been put forward as a reason for the site's perceived mystical properties. Flint in the Blick Mead spring pools near to the henge takes on a pink hue a couple of hours after being taken out of water due to the presence of the algae. It is assumed that ancient hunter-gatherers would have seen the rocks as having magical properties and would have deemed the site worthy of interest.
