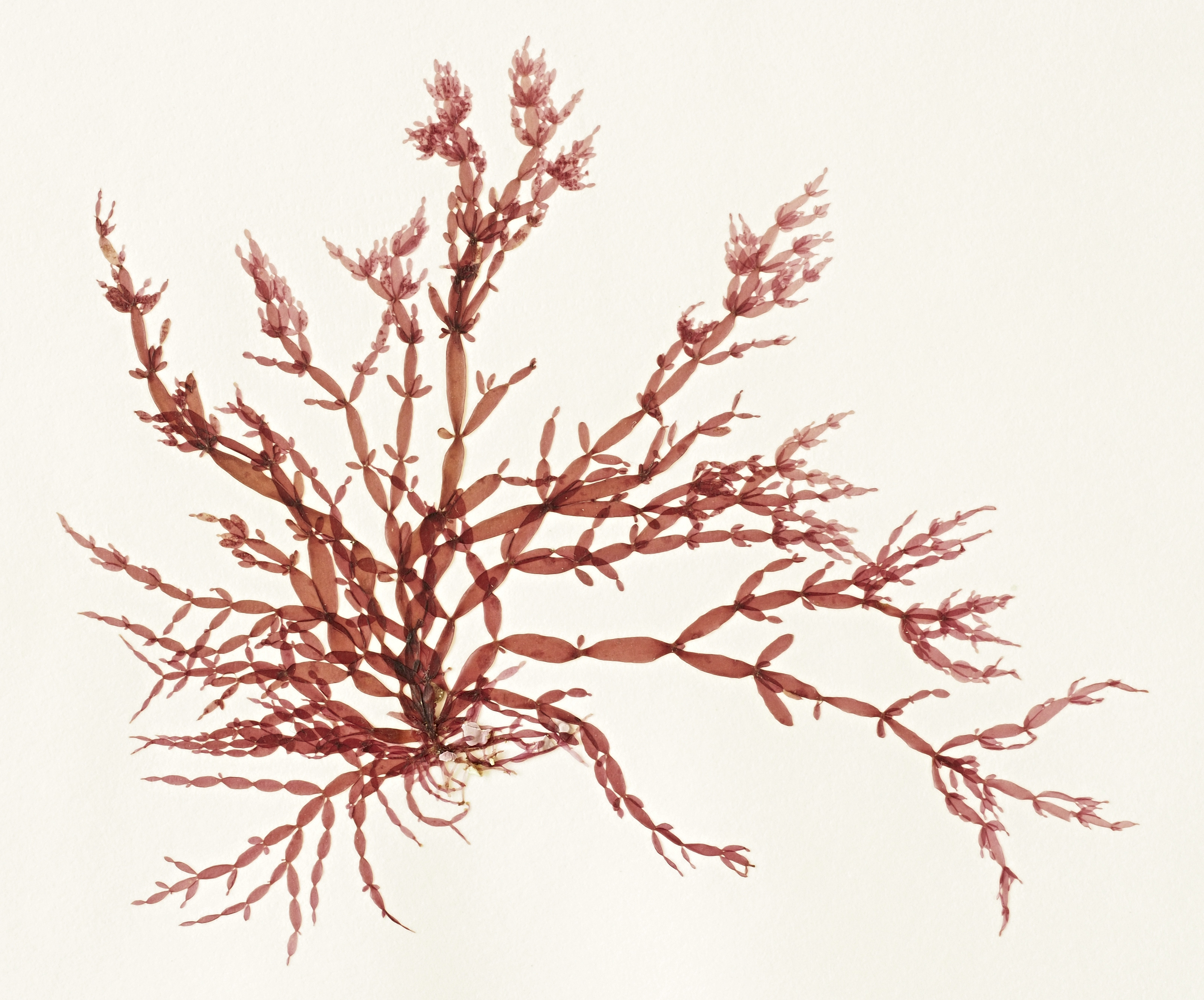

Scientific classification
- Clade: Archaeplastida
- Division: Rhodophyta
- Class: Florideophyceae
- Order: Rhodymeniales
- Family: Lomentariaceae
- Genus: Lomentaria; Lyngb.

Type species
- Lomentaria articulata Lyngb.

= Lomentaria =

Genus of algae

Lomentaria is a genus of red algae, containing the following species:

- Lomentaria articulata Lyngb.
- Lomentaria caespitosa (Harv.) V.J.Champm. & Dromgoole
