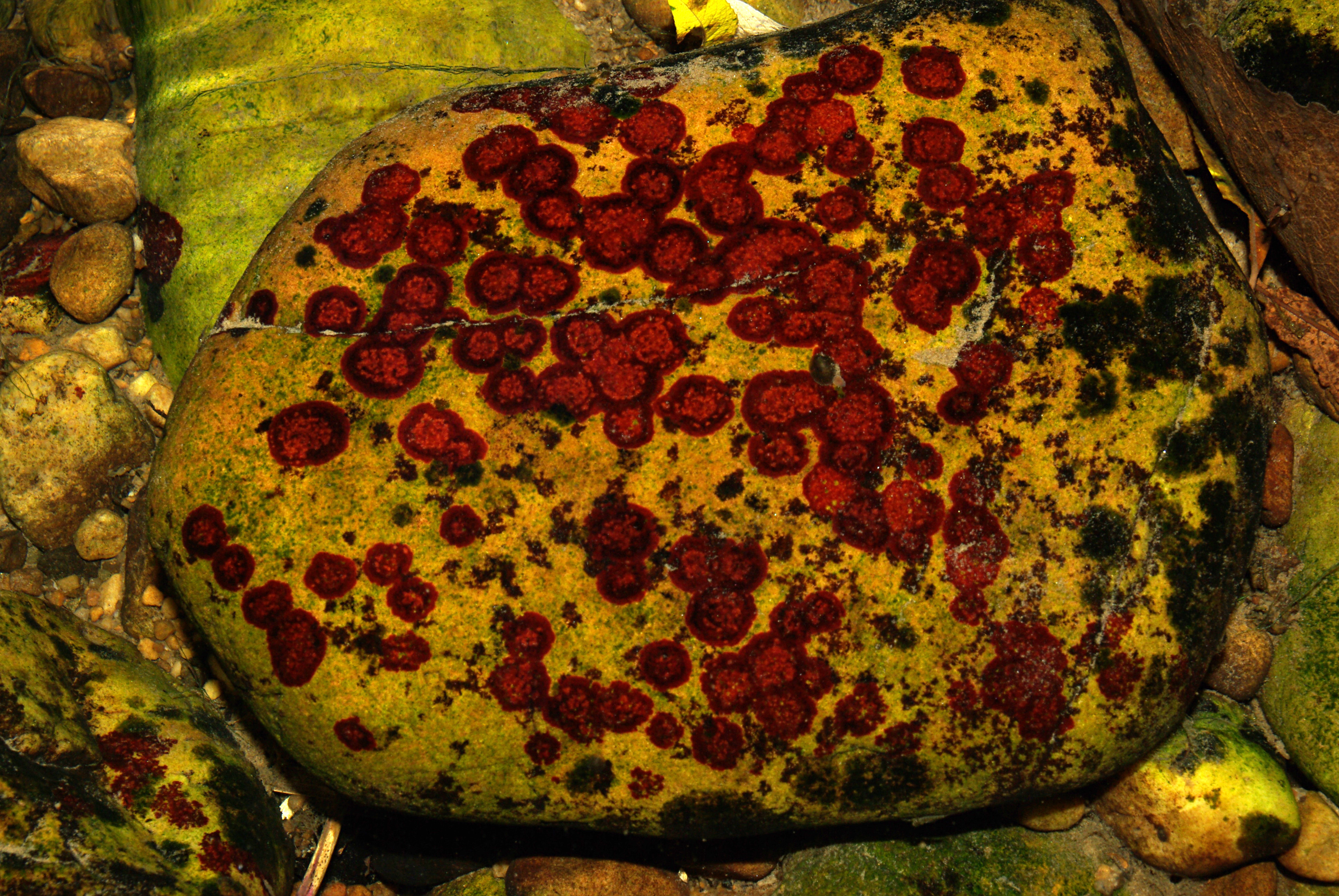
- Hildenbrandia rivularis

Scientific classification
- Clade: Archaeplastida
- Division: Rhodophyta
- Class: Florideophyceae
- Subclass: Hildenbrandiophycidae; G.W.Saunders & Hommersand
- Order: Hildenbrandiales; Pueschel & Cole, 1982
- Family: Hildenbrandiaceae; Rabenhorst, 1868

Genera
- Apophlaea; Hildenbrandia; Rhodytapium

= Hildenbrandiales =

Order of algae

Hildenbrandiales is an order of crustose forms red alga which bear conceptacles and produce secondary pit-connections. They reproduce by vegetative gemmae as well as tetrasporangia, which are produced inside the conceptacles. The way in which the tetraspores are produced is unusual enough to justify the formation of this distinct order. Some members of the order are known from freshwater rivers as well.

== Systematics ==
Hildenbradiales are difficult to discriminate on morphological grounds; tetrasporangia morphology is the only vaguely reliable character, but molecular techniques have indicated a monophyletic Apophlaea within a paraphyletic Hildenbrandia, with many Hildenbrandia species being recognized as non-monophyletic.
