= Wrack (seaweed) =

Part of several common seaweed names

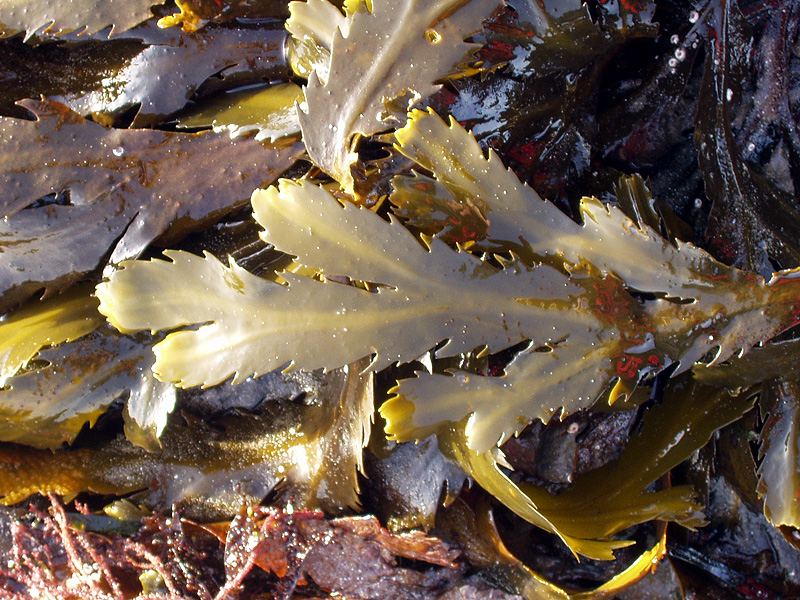
Fucus serratus, "toothed wrack"

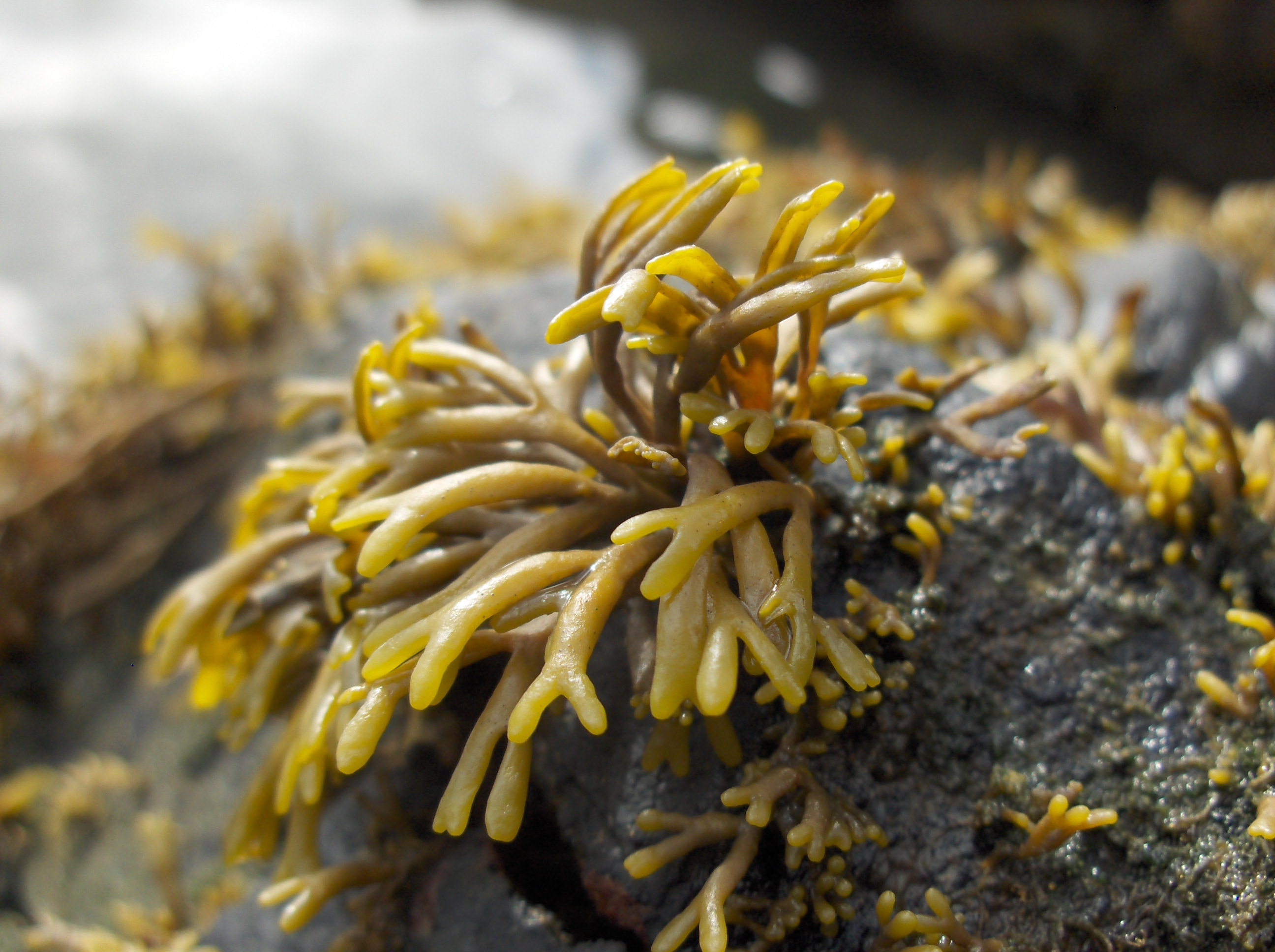
Pelvetia canaliculata, "channelled wrack"

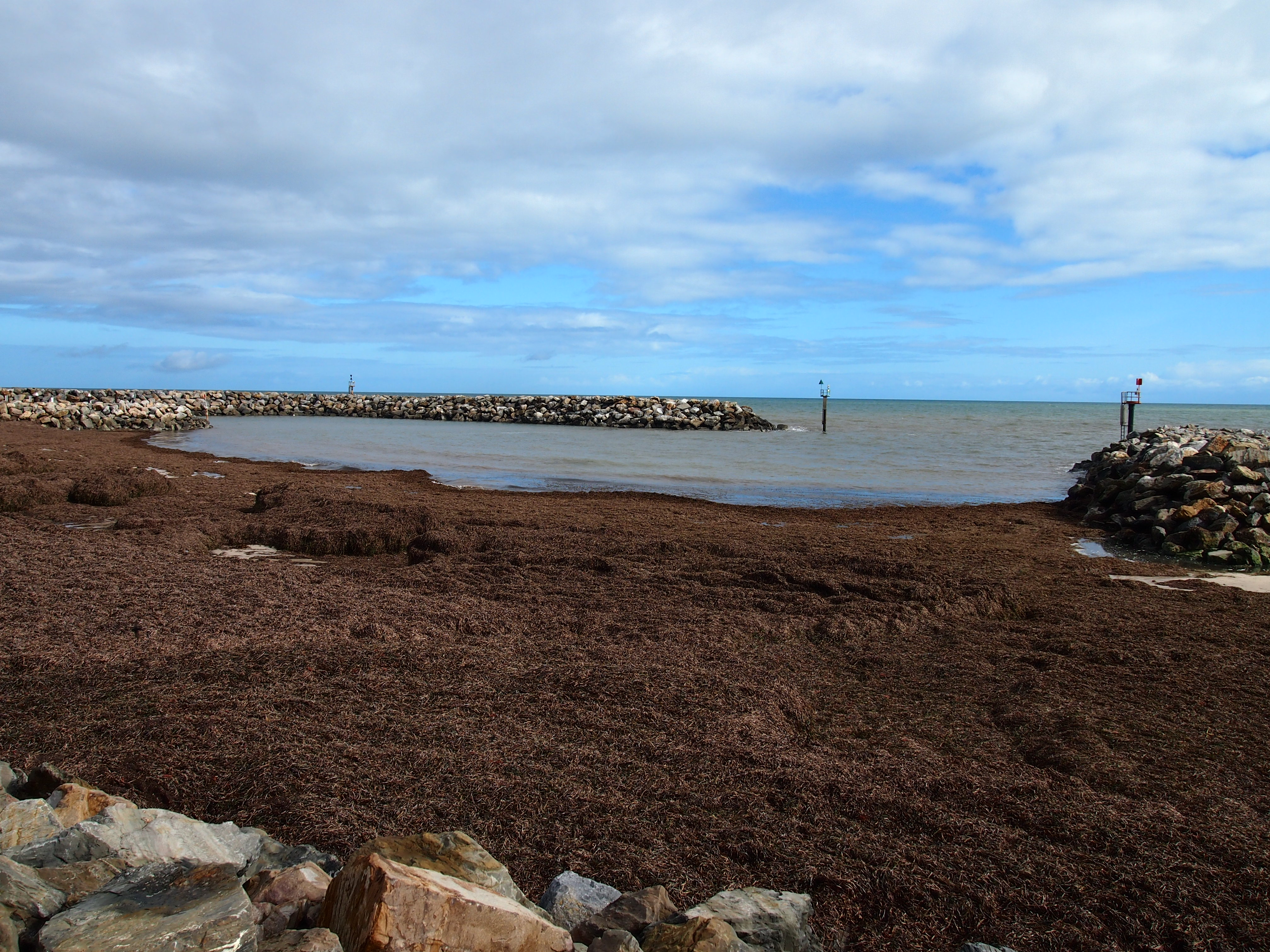
Accumulation of detrital seagrass wrack (Posidonia australis) at West Beach, South Australia

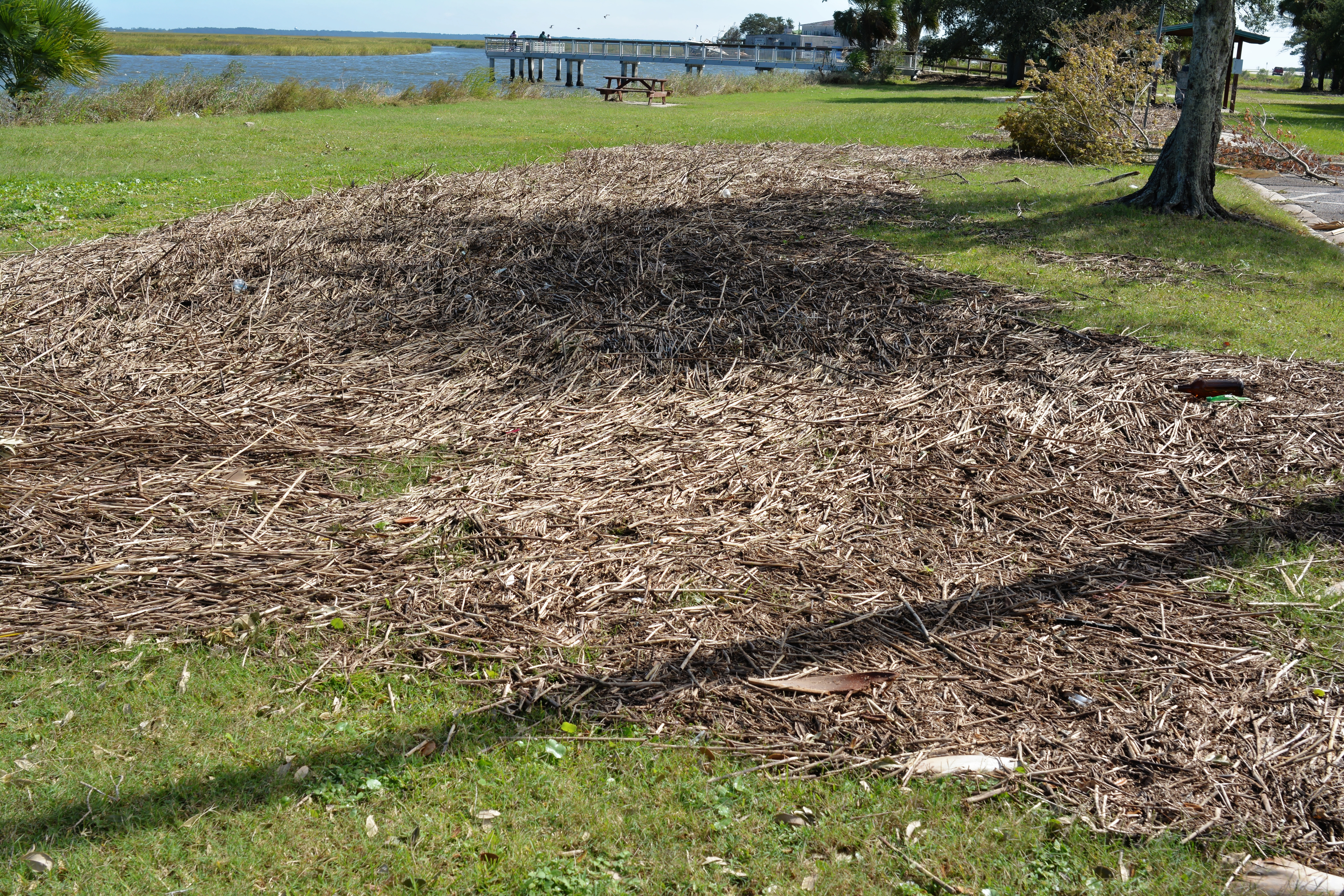
Wrack washed ashore in Brunswick, Georgia by Hurricane Matthew

Wrack is part of the common names of several species of seaweed in the family Fucaceae. It may also refer more generally to any seaweeds or seagrasses that wash up on beaches and may accumulate in the wrack zone.

It consists largely of species of Fucus — brown algae with flat branched ribbon-like fronds, characterized in F. serratus by a saw-toothed margin and in F. vesiculosus, another common species, by bearing air-bladders. Another component of sea wrack may be seagrasses such as Zostera marina a marine flowering plant with bright green long narrow grass-like leaves. Posidonia australis, which occurs sub-tidally on the southern coasts of Australia, sheds its older ribbon-like leaf blades in winter, resulting in thick accumulations along more sheltered shorelines.

- "Bladder wrack", Fucus vesiculosus
- "Channelled wrack", Pelvetia canaliculata
- "Knotted wrack", Ascophyllum nodosum
- "Spiral wrack" or "flat wrack", Fucus spiralis
- "Toothed wrack" or "serrated wrack", Fucus serratus

Historically wrack was used for making manure, and for making "kelp", a form of potash.

The word's origin is possibly from M Dutch 'wrak', from its root - to push, to shove, to drive. In the case of seaweed, its sense is in a possible derivation of the word wreck - cast up on shore.
