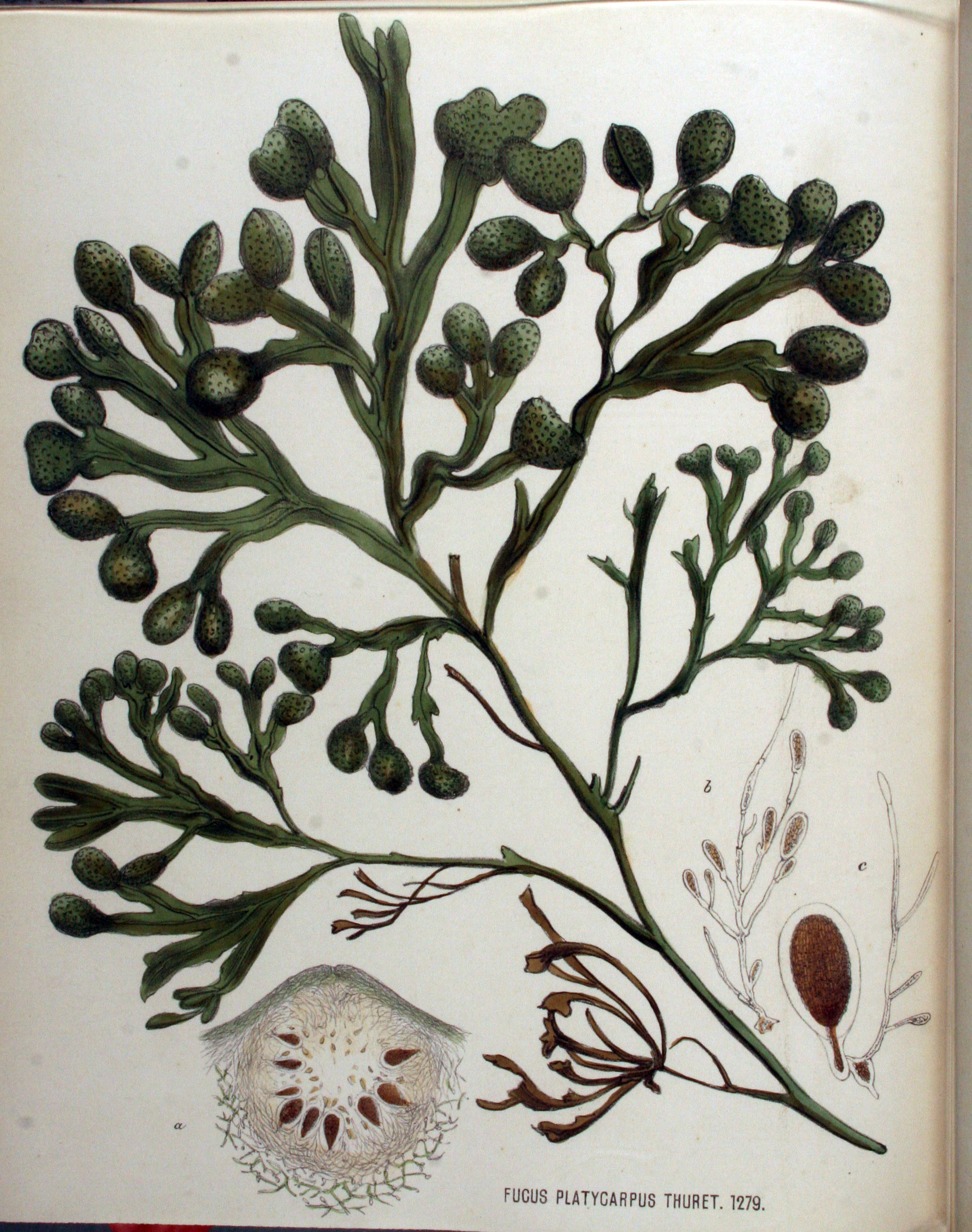

Scientific classification
- Domain: Eukaryota
- Clade: Diaphoretickes
- Clade: SAR
- Clade: Stramenopiles
- Phylum: Gyrista
- Subphylum: Ochrophytina
- Class: Phaeophyceae
- Order: Fucales
- Family: Fucaceae
- Genus: Fucus
- Species: F. guiryi

Binomial name
- Fucus guiryi G.I.Zardi, K.R.Nicastro, E.S.Serrão & G.A.Pearson

= Fucus guiryi =

Species of Phaeophyceae

Fucus guiryi is a brown alga in the family Fucaceae. It is known from numerous locations along the east coast of the North Atlantic Ocean, from Ireland to the Canary Islands.

The species is named in honor of Irish botanist Michael D. Guiry.

== Description ==
The thallus grows to 35 cm long - smaller than other similar species, it is attached by a discoid holdfast. The thallus is flattened and has a midrib like the other common species of Fucus. However it does not have bladders, as Fucus vesiculosus, or serrated edges to the fronds as Fucus serratus nor a twisted thallus, as Fucus spiralis. Fucus ceranoides does not have bladders but may have elongated air pockets in the fronds. The receptacles on F. guiryi show a distinct rim around the edge.

== Habitat ==
Found growing on rock in the upper mid-littoral.
