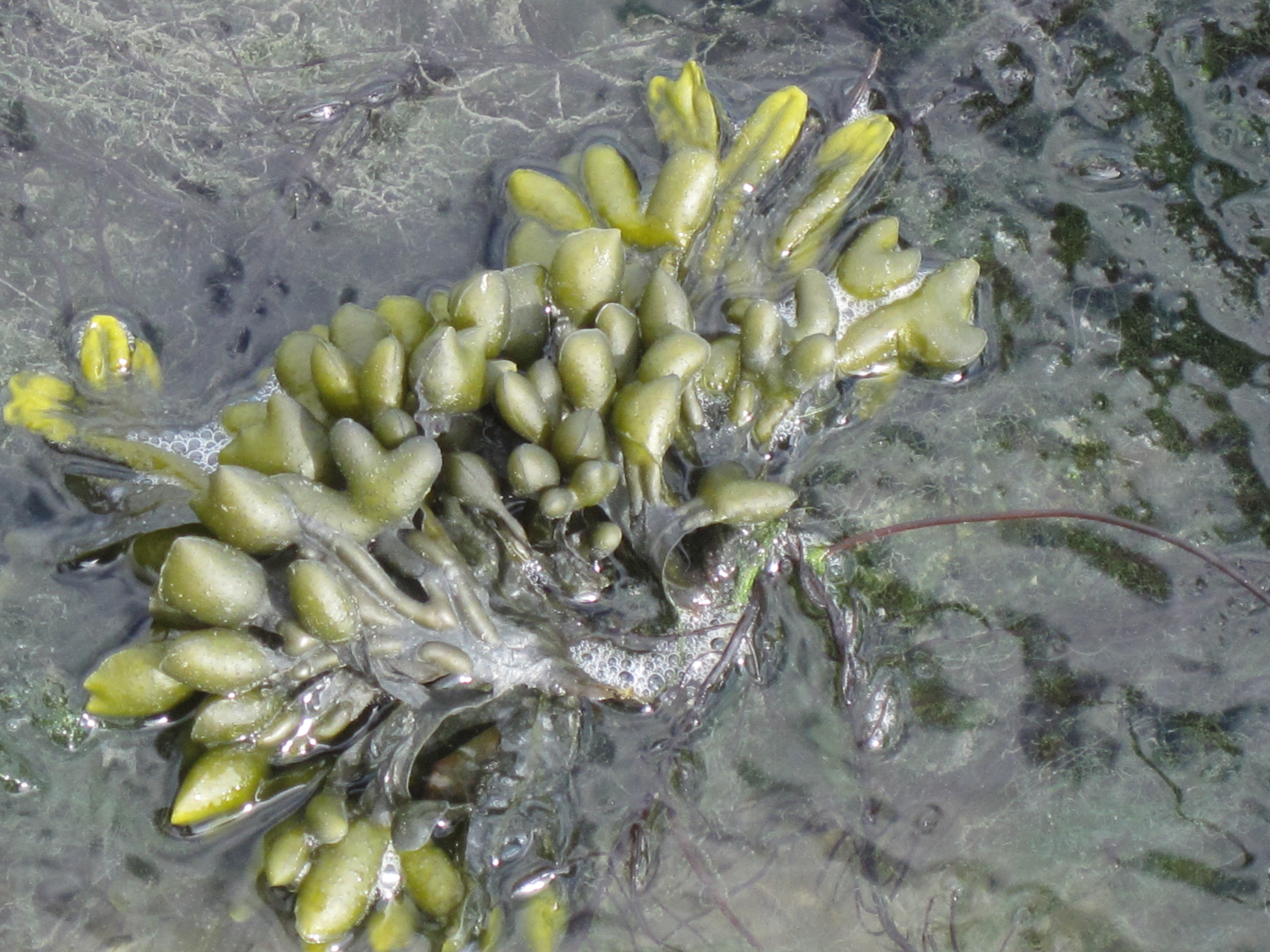

Scientific classification
- Domain: Eukaryota
- Clade: Sar
- Clade: Stramenopiles
- Phylum: Ochrophyta
- Class: Phaeophyceae
- Order: Fucales
- Family: Fucaceae
- Genus: Fucus
- Species: F. ceranoides

Binomial name
- Fucus ceranoides L.

= Fucus ceranoides =

Species of seaweed

Fucus ceranoides is a species of brown algae found in the littoral zone of the sea shore.

== Description ==
Fucus ceranoides is a species similar to other species of Fucus. It is linear to about 1 cm wide and is attached by a discoid holdfast. The branches grow to a length of 60 cm and show a clear midrib. Its margin is entire and it differs from Fucus serratus in not having a serrated edge and unlike Fucus vesiculosus it does not have air vesicles, however irregular swellings gives it a resemblance to F. vesiculosus. Fucus spiralis has spirally twisted fronds.

== Distribution ==
Fucoids have no planktonic dispersal stages, restricting gamete dispersal. They can be found on the shores of Ireland and Great Britain including the Isle of Man and Shetland.

== Habitat ==
Fucus ceranoides is restricted to estuarine intertidal habitats under fluctuating salinities. The modern distribution of Fucus ceranoides ranges from Portugal to Norway and Iceland. This includes the rocky shores in the littoral generally where fresh water flows into the sea, brackish water in sheltered bays. Fucus ceranoides are well adapted to abiotic conditions encountered across estuarine salinities. Increased levels of salinity present the most stress to Fucus ceranoides, hence their absence from marine conditions and its inability to colonize the coasts. At levels of high salinity, Fucus ceranoides will decay to a rust brown color.
