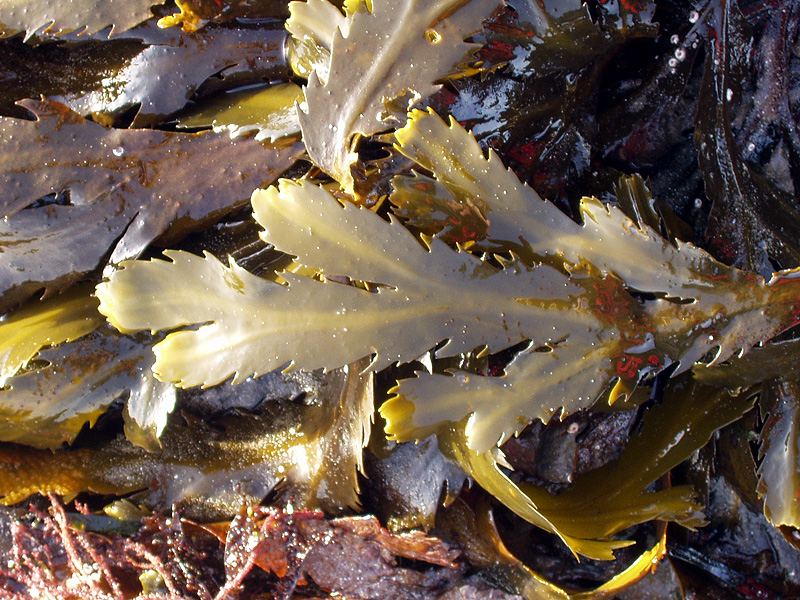
- Fucus serratus

Scientific classification
- Domain: Eukaryota
- Clade: Sar
- Clade: Stramenopiles
- Division: Ochrophyta
- Class: Phaeophyceae
- Order: Fucales
- Family: Fucaceae
- Genus: Fucus; L.

Species
- Fucus atomarius (Woodward) Bertoloni; Fucus ceranoides L.; Fucus chalonii Feldmann; Fucus cottonii M. J. Wynne & Magne; Fucus distichus L.; Fucus evanescens C.Agardh; Fucus furcatus Stackhouse, 1801; Fucus guiryi G. I. Zardi, K. R. Nicastro, E. A. Serrão, G. A. Pearson; Fucus gardneri P. C. Silva; Fucus lagasca Clemente, 1807; Fucus macroguiryi Almeida, E.A.Serrão & G.A.Pearson, 2022; Fucus mytili Nienburg; Fucus nereideus Lightfoot; Fucus radicans L. Bergström & L. Kautsky, 2005; Fucus serratus L.; Fucus spermophorus L.; Fucus spiralis L.; Fucus tendo L.; Fucus vesiculosus L.; Fucus virsoides J. Agardh

= Fucus =

Genus of brown algae

Fucus is a genus of brown algae found in the intertidal zones of rocky seashores almost throughout the world.

== Description and life cycle ==
The thallus is perennial with an irregular or disc-shaped holdfast or with haptera. The erect portion of the thallus is dichotomous or subpinnately branched, flattened and with a distinct midrib. Gas-filled pneumatocysts (air-vesicles) are present in pairs in some species, one on either side of the midrib. The erect portion of the thallus bears cryptostomata and caecostomata (sterile surface cavities). The base of the thallus is stipe-like due to abrasion of the tissue lateral to the midrib and it is attached to the rock by a holdfast. The gametangia develop in conceptacles embedded in receptacles in the apices of the final branches. They may be monoecious or dioecious.

These algae have a relatively simple life cycle and produce only one type of thallus which grows to a maximum size of 2 metres (6 feet). Fertile cavities, the conceptacles, containing the reproductive cells are immersed in the receptacles near the ends of the branches. After meiosis, oogonia and antheridia, the female and male reproductive organs, produce egg cells and sperm respectively that are released into the sea where fertilisation takes place. The resulting zygote develops directly into the diploid plant. This contrasts with the life cycle of the flowering plant, where the egg cells and sperm are produced by a haploid multicellular generation, albeit very strongly reduced, and the egg cells are fertilised within the ovules of the parent plant and then released as seeds.

== Distribution and ecology ==
Species of Fucus are recorded almost worldwide as attached and unattached forms. They are dominant on the shores of the British Isles, the northeastern coast of North America and California.

In the British Isles these larger brown algae occur on sheltered shores in fairly well defined zones along the shore from high-water mark to below low water mark. On the more exposed shores not all of these species can be found and on very exposed shores few, if any, occur. Pelvetia canaliculata forms a zone at the top of the shore. Just below this Fucus spiralis, Fucus vesiculosus, Fucus serratus and Laminaria form clear zones, one below the other, along the shore down to low water mark. On sheltered shores Ascophyllum nodosum usually forms a broad and dominating zone along the shore at the mid-littoral. Other brown algae can be found at the low-littoral such as Himanthalia, Laminaria saxatilis and Alaria esculenta. Small green and red algae and animals occur, protected under these large brown algae. When washed up on beaches, kelp flies such as Coelopa pilipes feed and breed on Fucus algae.

== Uses ==
In Scotland and Norway, up until the mid-19th century, several seaweed species from Fucus and other genera were harvested, dried, burned to ash, and further processed to become "kelp", which was a type of soda ash that was less costly in Britain than the barilla imported from Spain. It has an alkali content of about 2.5%–5% that was mainly sodium carbonate (Na_{2}CO_{3}), used in soapmaking, glassmaking, and other industries. The purest barilla had a sodium carbonate concentration of about 30%. The seaweed was also used as fertilizer for crop land in the same areas in which it was harvested. (Note: Clow and Clow indicate four species of seaweed as sources for kelp: Fucus vesiculosus, Ascophyllum nodosum (formerly Fucus nodosus L.), Fucus serratus, and Laminaria digitata (Hudson) J.V. Lamouroux (formerly Fucus digitatus L.).)

Fucus species can also be used for thalassotherapy, along with other species such as Turkish towel (Chondracanthus exasperatus), feather boa (Egregia menziesii), and finger kelp (Laminaria digitata).

In 2005, it was announced that bacteria grown on Fucus have the ability to attack and kill the MRSA superbacterium.

Because of their easily accessible apolar eggs and free-floating zygotes, several Fucus species have been used as model organisms to study cell polarity, the development of growth axes, and the role of the cell wall in establishing and maintaining cell identity.

== Predator ==
The seaweed fly, Coelopa frigida, together with other species of Coelopa, are known to feed, mate, and create habitats out of different species of Fucus. This is of particular notice when the Fucus is stranded on the beach and not when it is submerged under seawater. With increasing amounts of seaweed washing up on shores, there is an increasing recognition of Fucus and their close pairing with Coelopa.

== Taxonomy ==
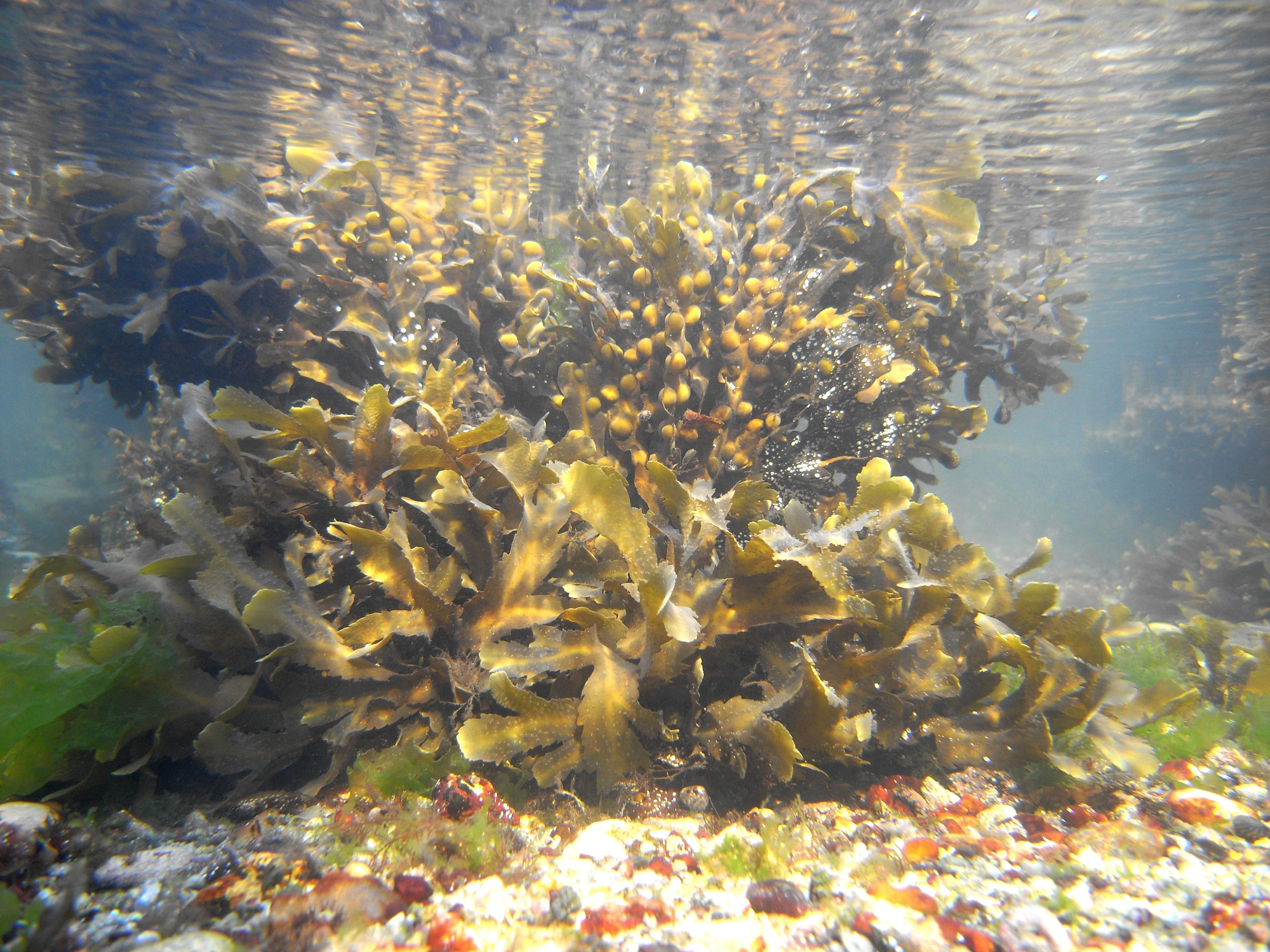
Two species of Fucus growing next to each other in the intertidal zone, F. serratus in the front, F. vesiculosus in the back

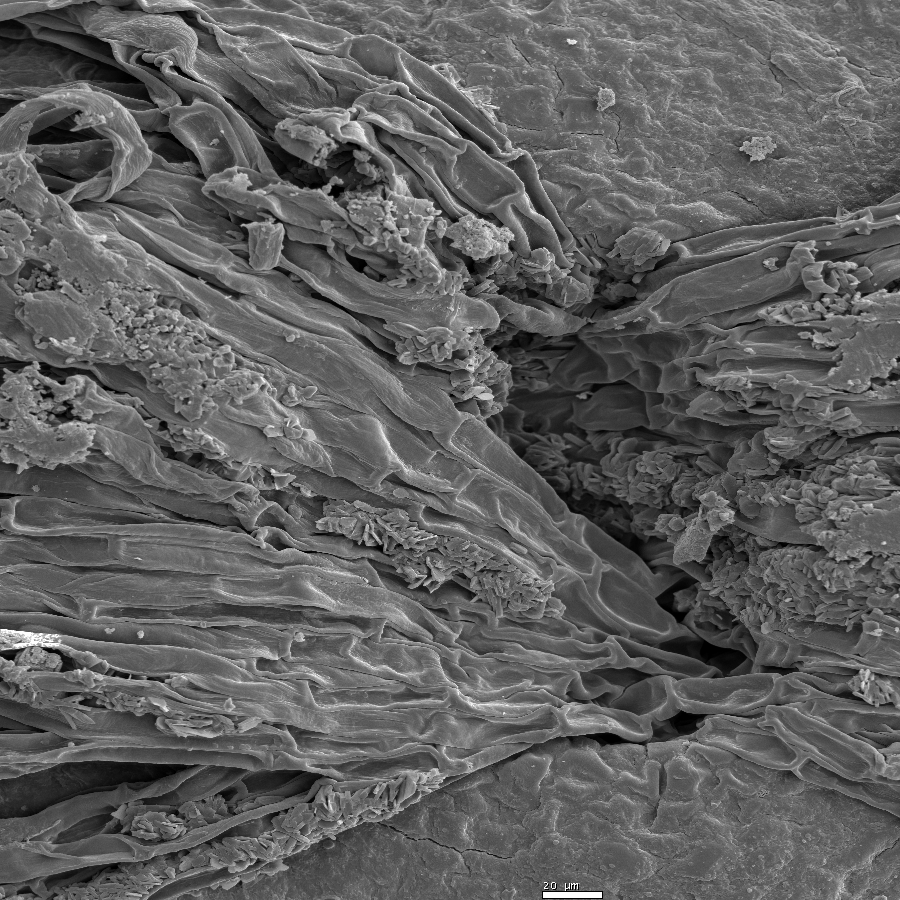
Conceptacle of F. vesiculosus, with filaments protruding; Scale bar: 20 μm

This list of species of Fucus excludes names of uncertain status:

- Fucus atomarius (Woodward) Bertoloni
- Fucus ceranoides L. – horned wrack *
- Fucus chalonii Feldmann
- Fucus cottonii M. J. Wynne & Magne *(=Fucus cottonii M.J.Wynne & Magne nom. illeg.)
- Fucus distichus L. *
- Fucus evanescens C.Agardh *
- Fucus furcatus Stackhouse, 1801
- Fucus guiryi G. I. Zardi, K. R. Nicastro, E. A. Serrão, G. A. Pearson *
- Fucus gardneri P. C. Silva
- Fucus lagasca Clemente, 1807
- Fucus macroguiryi Almeida, E.A.Serrão & G.A.Pearson, 2022
- Fucus mytili Nienburg
- Fucus nereideus Lightfoot
- Fucus radicans L. Bergström & L. Kautsky, 2005
- Fucus serratus L. – toothed wrack *
- Fucus spermophorus L.
- Fucus spiralis L. – spiral wrack *
- Fucus tendo L.
- Fucus vesiculosus L. – bladder wrack *
- Fucus virsoides J. Agardh

* Species recorded around the coast of Britain.

=== Fucus distichus ===
F. distichus is up to 10 cm (4 inches) long with a short stout cylindrical stipe, branching dichotomous, flat and with a mid-rib. F. distichus subsp. edentatus was first described from Shetland by Börgesen in 1903. Powell found F. distichus subsp. anceps on the north coast of Caithness. It had also been recorded from: Orkney, Fair Isle, St Kilda and the Outer Hebrides in Scotland; in Ireland it had been recorded from Counties Clare, Donegal and Kerry. Two subspecies of F. distichus (subsp. anceps and subsp. edentatus) have been described from the British Isles.

Fucus distichus is the organism used as a model to study the development of cell polarity, since it forms an apolar zygote that can develop polarity given a varying number of gradients.

=== Fucus serratus ===
F. serratus, toothed wrack, is the most distinctive of all the Fucus species. It clearly shows a distinctive serrated edge to the frond not shown by the other species of the genus.

=== Fucus spiralis ===
F. spiralis is one of the three most common algae on the shores of the British Isles. It grows to about 40 cm (15 inches) long and does not show air bladders as found on F.vesiculosus or toothed edges as found on F. serratus. It forms a zone near the top of the shore above the zones of F. vesiculosus and F. serratus.

=== Fucus vesiculosus ===
This is one of the most common species of Fucus, common on most shores in the mid-littoral. It has the common name "bladder wrack", and is readily identified by a distinct mid-rib and air vesicles in pairs on either side of the mid-rib.
