= Fucus radicans =

Scientific classification
- Domain: Eukaryota
- Clade: Sar
- Clade: Stramenopiles
- Division: Ochrophyta
- Class: Phaeophyceae
- Order: Fucales
- Family: Fucaceae
- Genus: Fucus
- Species: F. radicans

Binomial name
- Fucus radicans L. Bergström & L. Kautsky, 2005

Species of seaweed

Fucus radicans is a species of brown algae in the family Fucaceae, endemic to and recently evolved within the Baltic Sea. The species was first described by Lena Bergström and Lena Kautsky in 2005 from a location in Ångermanland, Sweden. The specific epithet is from the Latin and means "rooting", referring to the fact that this species primarily reproduces by the taking root of detached fragments.

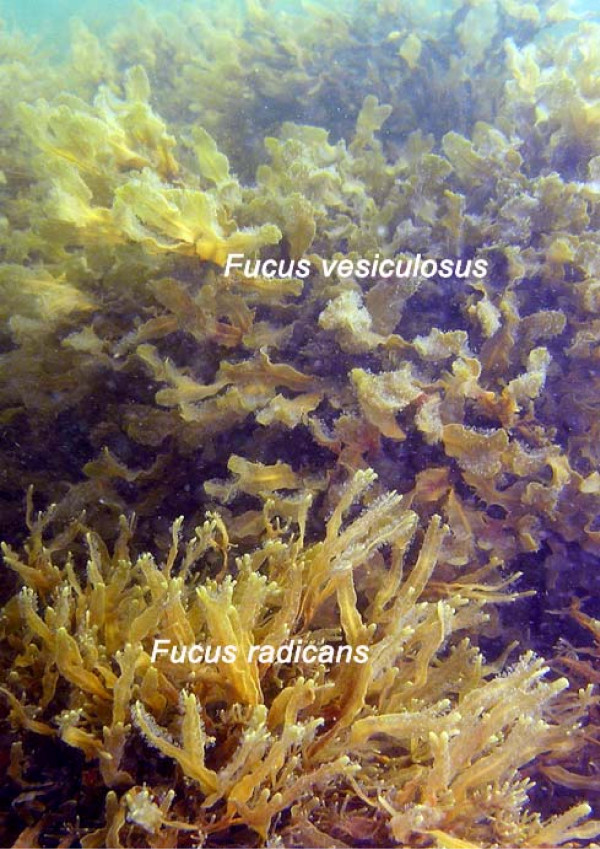
Fucus radicans and F. vesiculosus living together

Fucus radicans seems to have diverged from the closely related and widely distributed Fucus vesiculosus within about the last 400 years. It often reproduces clonally, which may have helped its rapid emergence as a new species. Genetic analysis supports the hypothesis of the recent divergence of Fucus radicans from Fucus vesiculosus as an example of sympatric speciation, with the two species presently occupying the same semi-marine territory.

== Description ==
Fucus radicans is morphologically similar to bladderwrack (Fucus vesiculosus) which is dichotomously branched, and has brown leathery fronds known as thalli with a prominent midrib and globular air bladders. The main differences between the two are that plants of F. radicans are smaller and more bushy than F. vesiculosus and have narrower thalli. Bladderwrack is common on the foreshore on both sides of the temperate North Atlantic and the subarctic. F. radicans is endemic to the Baltic Sea, where it grows alongside F. vesiculosus.

== The Baltic Sea and speciation ==
The Baltic Sea was formed by the retreating ice after the last ice age, about ten thousand years ago. At first it was a freshwater lake but the sea broke through on more than one occasion. From about 4,000 years ago till the present time it has been a brackish water area, relatively isolated from the North Sea with only occasional inflows of oceanic water. Over 200 rivers flow into the Baltic and this results in the surface layers being much less saline than other seas. There is a certain amount of inflow of water from the North Sea but this remains on the bottom and relatively unmixed with the surface waters. F. radicans is endemic to the Baltic Sea, where it grows in shallow water alongside F. vesiculosus. It seems to be specially adapted to low salinity levels and unable to tolerate the higher levels of salinity to which other species of seaweed are habituated. Even within the Baltic, salinity levels vary and F. radicans favours the northernmost part, the Gulf of Bothnia, where the brackish water may have a salinity of less than 10‰ (the open ocean has an average of 35‰).

Being intermediate between sea and fresh water, the Baltic Sea, and especially the Gulf of Bothnia, has a low biodiversity and supports only a small number of plant and animal species that have been able to adapt to this level of salinity. Those that are present tend to be smaller than in their main habitats, be those marine or freshwater biomes. Bladderwrack (F. vesiculosus) has a wide distribution and is present in quantities in the Baltic Sea where it lives side by side with the very similar F. radicans. Studies to find their evolutionary relationship using chloroplast (RuBisCO gene) or mitochondrial DNA (intergenic spacer) sequence markers have been inconclusive. Genetic analysis using microsatellite markers (short DNA sequences) suggests that a divergence between the two species occurred between 125 and 2475 years ago with a posterior distribution peak at around 400 years ago. This means the species would have diverged more recently than the transition of the Baltic Sea from a marine environment to its present brackish state. This hypothesis is supported by the fact that F. radicans is found nowhere else other than the Baltic.

An isolating mechanism between the two species may be the fact that F. vesiculosus normally reproduces sexually whereas F. radicans shows a much greater tendency to reproduce asexually, with detached fragments having the ability to take root and develop into new plants. Environmental stress, in this instance the decrease in salinity of the water, has been shown to contribute to the formation of new species. Another contributor to speciation is the evolutionary pressure applied by the change in the environment.

== Genetic biodiversity ==
Fucus radicans is endemic to the Baltic Sea where it occurs along the coasts of the Bothnian Sea and in Estonian waters. It may also be present in (the Russian of) Gulf of Finland. Just like the closely related bladder wrack (F. vesiculosus), F. radicans can reproduce both sexually and asexually.

The genetic structure in F. radicans is complex, and the genetic differences between populations in Estonia and in Gulf of Bothnia are substantial. Some populations are almost completely sexually recruited while others are dominated by single clones. The Estonian populations are mostly sexually reproduced, and harbour large genetic variation. The populations in the Bothnian Sea mostly recruit asexually, and are dominated by two clones—one female and one male. The female is found along a 550 km coastline, making up 20–95 % of the individuals in local populations. Due to this dominant clone, the genetic structure in F. radicans is less fine-scaled than in bladder wrack in this area.

=== Management ===
Genetic variation is fundamental for a species ability to adapt and survive in new environmental conditions. To mitigate future losses, management and conservation of Baltic Sea biodiversity should include also the genetic level. The situation in Fucus radicans, with large areas with no or very little sexual reproduction, means that this species has low potential for future genetic adaption. Thus, the warming and salinity decrease predicted for the Baltic Sea over the coming 50 to 100 years could risk the loss of populations and even the whole species.

According to the Baltic Sea research and development project BONUS BAMBI, management for long-term conservation of F. radicans should aim to:

- protect populations with sexual activity. The sexually reproducing Estonian populations should be highly prioritised,
- maintain large population sizes,
- maintain connectivity between populations at present levels,
- provide management plans for populations in the Bothnian Sea and in Estonian waters, and in Gulf of Finland – if present.

Since the Estonian populations are genetically different from other populations, they should not be used to replace lost populations in the Bothnian Sea.
