= Fucus cottonii =

Scientific classification
- Domain: Eukaryota
- Clade: Diaphoretickes
- Clade: Sar
- Clade: Stramenopiles
- Phylum: Gyrista
- Subphylum: Ochrophytina
- Class: Phaeophyceae
- Order: Fucales
- Family: Fucaceae
- Genus: Fucus
- Species: F. cottonii

Binomial name
- Fucus cottonii M. J. Wynne & Magne

Species of algae

Fucus cottonii, also known as moss wrack, is a species of brown algae that grows in low energy salt-marsh environments on Atlantic and Pacific coasts. The algae is small in comparison to other members of the Fucus genus and lacks the bladders common in other species, such as Fucus vesiculosus (bladder wrack). The species either grows partially embedded in the banks of an estuary, or entangled in halophytic vegetation.

The species does not form a monophyletic grouping, instead having arisen multiple times and converged to one morphological form. Similar forms can in fact develop in other genera, such as Ascophyllum. These small forms of algae lacking holdfasts and with reduced buoyancy are known as ecads.
