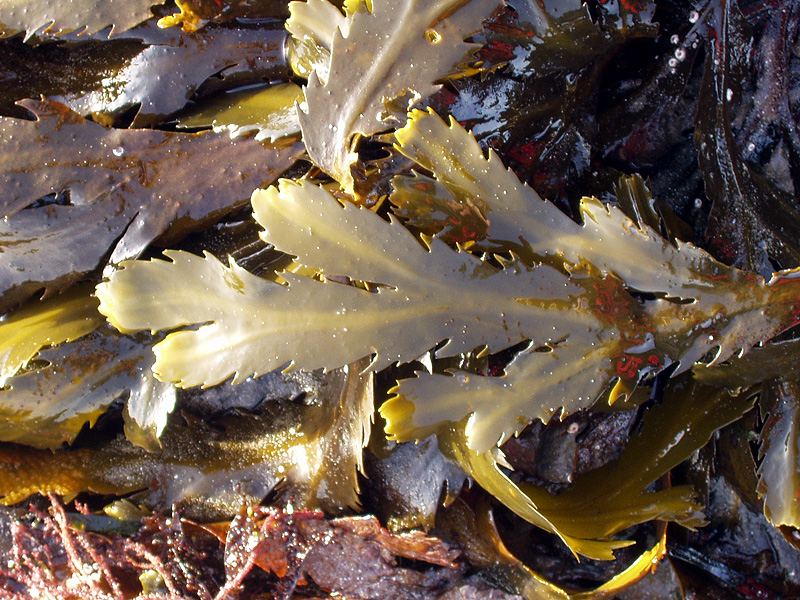

Scientific classification
- Domain: Eukaryota
- Clade: Sar
- Clade: Stramenopiles
- Division: Ochrophyta
- Class: Phaeophyceae
- Order: Fucales
- Family: Fucaceae
- Genus: Fucus
- Species: F. serratus

Binomial name
- Fucus serratus L.

= Fucus serratus =

Species of seaweed

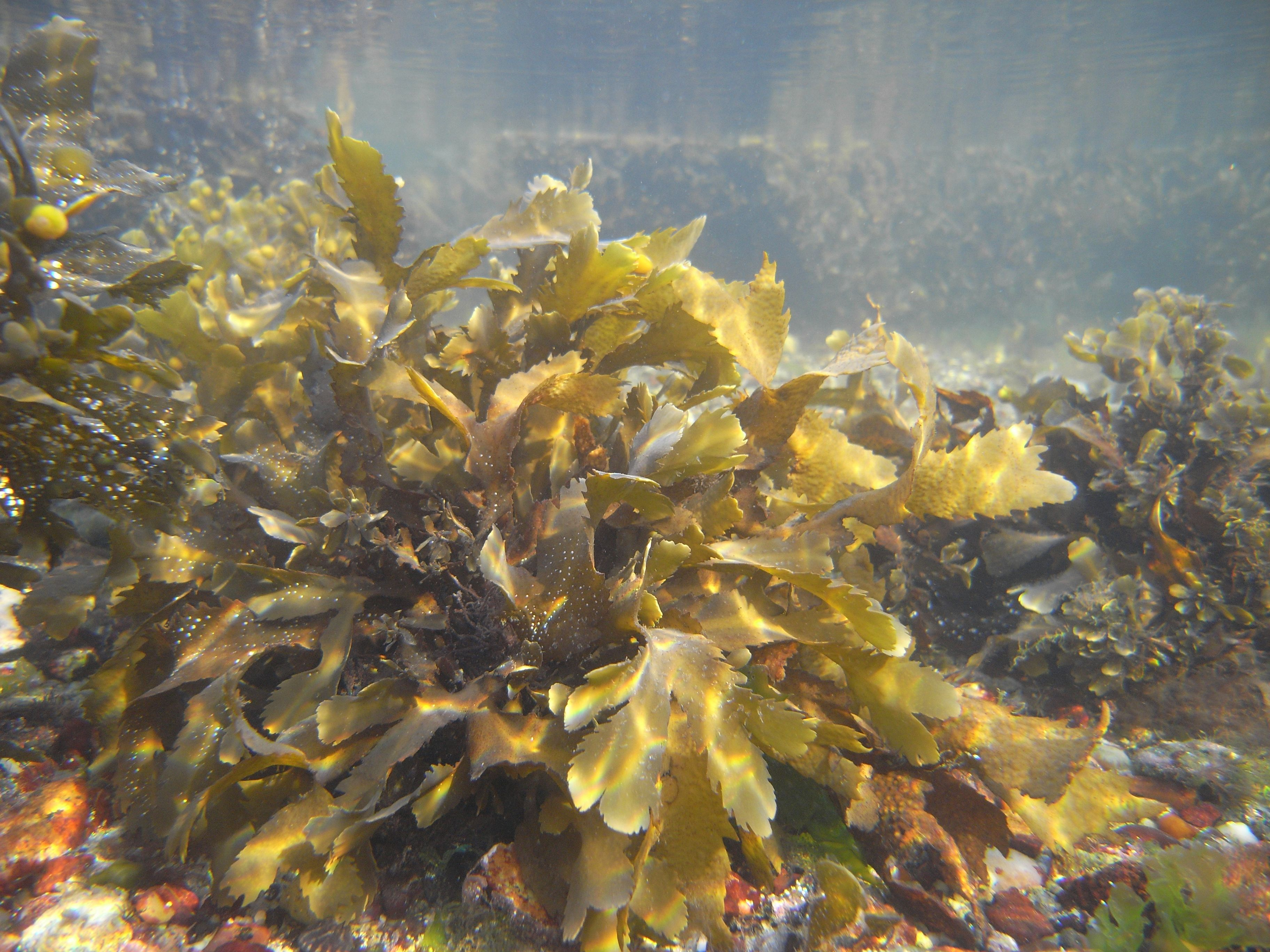
Fucus serratus in its natural habitat

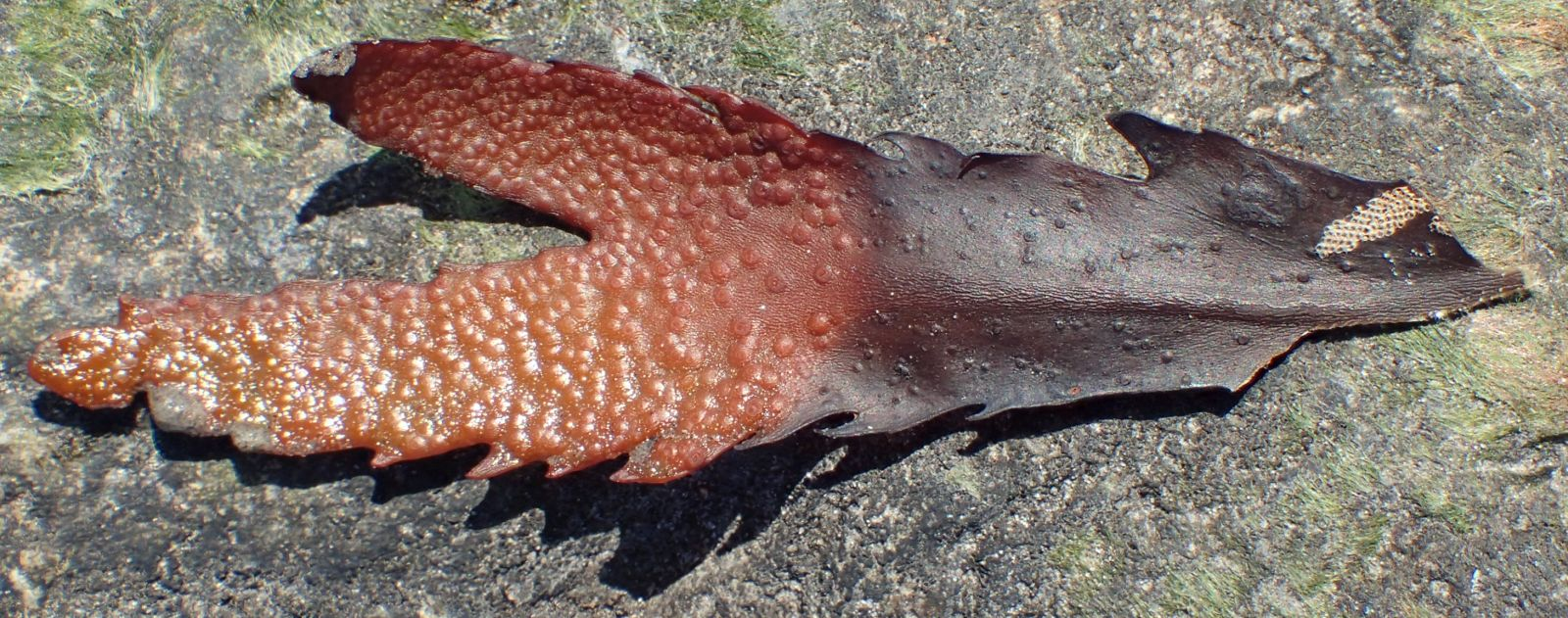
The eggs or sperm (here) form in conceptacles sunken in receptacles towards the tips on the branches.

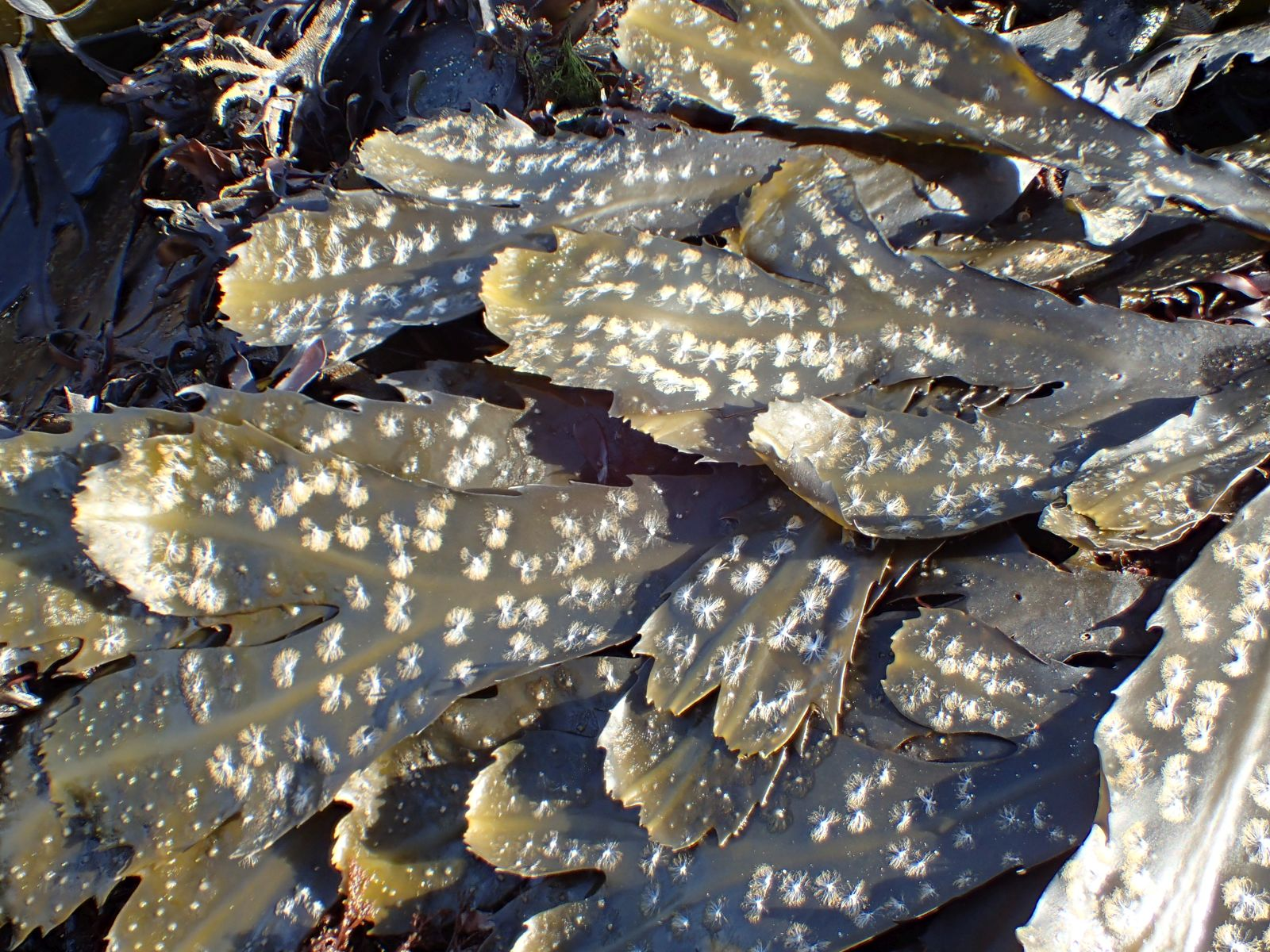
The lamina shows cryptostomata – small cavities which produce colourless hairs.

Fucus serratus is a seaweed of the north Atlantic Ocean, known as toothed wrack, serrated wrack, or saw wrack.

== Description and reproduction ==
Fucus serratus is a robust alga, olive-brown in colour and similar to Fucus vesiculosus and Fucus spiralis. The species is one of many algae that are multicellular. It grows from a discoid holdfast up to 180 centimetres (6 ft) long. The fronds are flat, about 2 cm (0.8 in) wide, bifurcating, and up to 1 m (3 ft 3 in) long including a short stipe. It branches irregularly and dichotomously. The flattened blade has a distinct midrib and is readily distinguished from related taxa by the serrated edge of the fronds. It does not have air vesicles, such as are found in F. vesiculosus, nor is it spirally twisted like F. spiralis. Male and female receptacles are on different plants. The lamina shows cryptostomata – small cavities which produce colourless hairs.

The reproductive bodies form in conceptacles sunken in receptacles towards the tips on the branches. In these conceptacles oogonia and antheridia are produced and after meiosis the oogonia and antheridia are released. Fertilisation follows and the zygote develops, settles and grows directly into the diploid sporophyte plant. The fertilization in the Fucus serratus would be associated with egg activation.

== Distribution ==
Fucus serratus is found along the Atlantic coast of Europe from Svalbard to Portugal, in the Canary Islands. It was introduced to the shores north-east America over 140 years ago, is presence described first at Pictou Harbour in the late 1860s by George Upham Hay and Alexander Howard McKay, its introduction to Iceland and the Faroe Islands could date back to the Vikings, within the last 1000 years and was first noted in a phycological survey in 1900.

== Ecology ==
Fucus serratus grows very well on slow draining shores where it may occupy up to a third of the area of the entire seashore. It often dominates the rocky parts of the lower shore, exposed or immersed in rock pools, on all but the most exposed shores. "...the littoral zone is characterised especially by such Phaeophyta (brown algae) as Pelvetia, Ascophyllum, Egregia, Fucus and Laminaria, particularly when the shore is rocky". It is considered an invasive species in the Canadian Maritimes, particularly on Prince Edward Island, Nova Scotia and the Northern coastline of New Brunswick. In Northern Europe and Iceland it is known to hybridize with Fucus distichus.

== Uses ==
Fucus serratus is used in Ireland and France for the production of cosmetics and for thalassotherapy. In the Western Isles of Scotland, it is harvested for use as a liquid fertiliser. Since the organism contains triacylglycerols and fatty acids.
