= Fucus macroguiryi =

Scientific classification
- Domain: Eukaryota
- Clade: Sar
- Clade: Stramenopiles
- Division: Ochrophyta
- Class: Phaeophyceae
- Order: Fucales
- Family: Fucaceae
- Genus: Fucus
- Species: F. macroguiryi

Binomial name
- Fucus macroguiryi Almeida, E.A.Serrão & G.A.Pearson

Species of algae

Fucus macroguiryi is a species of brown algae in the family Fucaceae. F. macroguiryi is similar to and often co-occurs with Fucus vesiculosus and Fucus spiralis. It diverges from F. vesiculosus though in its hermaphroditism which is a trait also present with F. spiralis.
