= Meiocarpidium =

Scientific classification
- Kingdom: Plantae
- Clade: Tracheophytes
- Clade: Angiosperms
- Clade: Magnoliids
- Order: Magnoliales
- Family: Annonaceae
- Subfamily: Ambavioideae
- Genus: Meiocarpidium; Engl. & Diels

Genus of plants

Meiocarpidium is a monotypic genus of plants in the family Annonaceae, with the only species being Meiocarpidium lepidotum. It is distributed in Cameroon, The Central African Republic, The Republic of the Congo, and Gabon. Adolf Engler and Ludwig Diels, the German botanists who first formally described the genus, named it after the small number (Latinized form of Greek μείω-, meio-) of carpels in the flowers.

== Description ==
Meiocarpidium have solitary hermaphroditic flowers. Their sepals have 3 small folds. Their flowers have 6 petals arranged in two rows of three with the interior a little bigger than the exterior. The flowers' receptacles are slightly convex. Their flowers have numerous stamen. Their flowers have 3-5 carpels with ovules in two ventral rows. Their seeds are brown, oval and are rounded on one side, but angular on the other.

== Species ==
It is a monotypic genus consisting of:

- Meiocarpidium lepidotum (Oliv.) Engl. & Diels
