= Cryptostoma =

Cryptostoma may refer to:

- Cryptostoma, structures found in some types of brown algae
- Cryptostoma (beetle), a genus in the family Eucnemidae
