= Fucus virsoides =

Scientific classification
- Domain: Eukaryota
- Clade: Diaphoretickes
- Clade: SAR
- Clade: Stramenopiles
- Phylum: Gyrista
- Subphylum: Ochrophytina
- Class: Phaeophyceae
- Order: Fucales
- Family: Fucaceae
- Genus: Fucus
- Species: F. virsoides

Binomial name
- Fucus virsoides J. Agardh (1868)

Species of seaweed

Fucus virsoides is a species of brown alga endemic to the Adriatic Sea. The Bay of Kotor was defined as one of the southernmost limits of Fucus virsoides.
