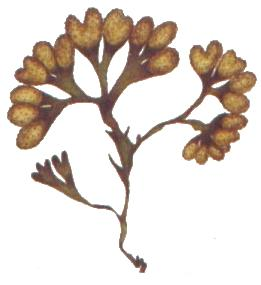

Scientific classification
- Domain: Eukaryota
- Clade: Sar
- Clade: Stramenopiles
- Division: Ochrophyta
- Class: Phaeophyceae
- Order: Fucales
- Family: Fucaceae
- Genus: Fucus
- Species: F. spiralis

Binomial name
- Fucus spiralis L.

= Fucus spiralis =

Species of seaweed

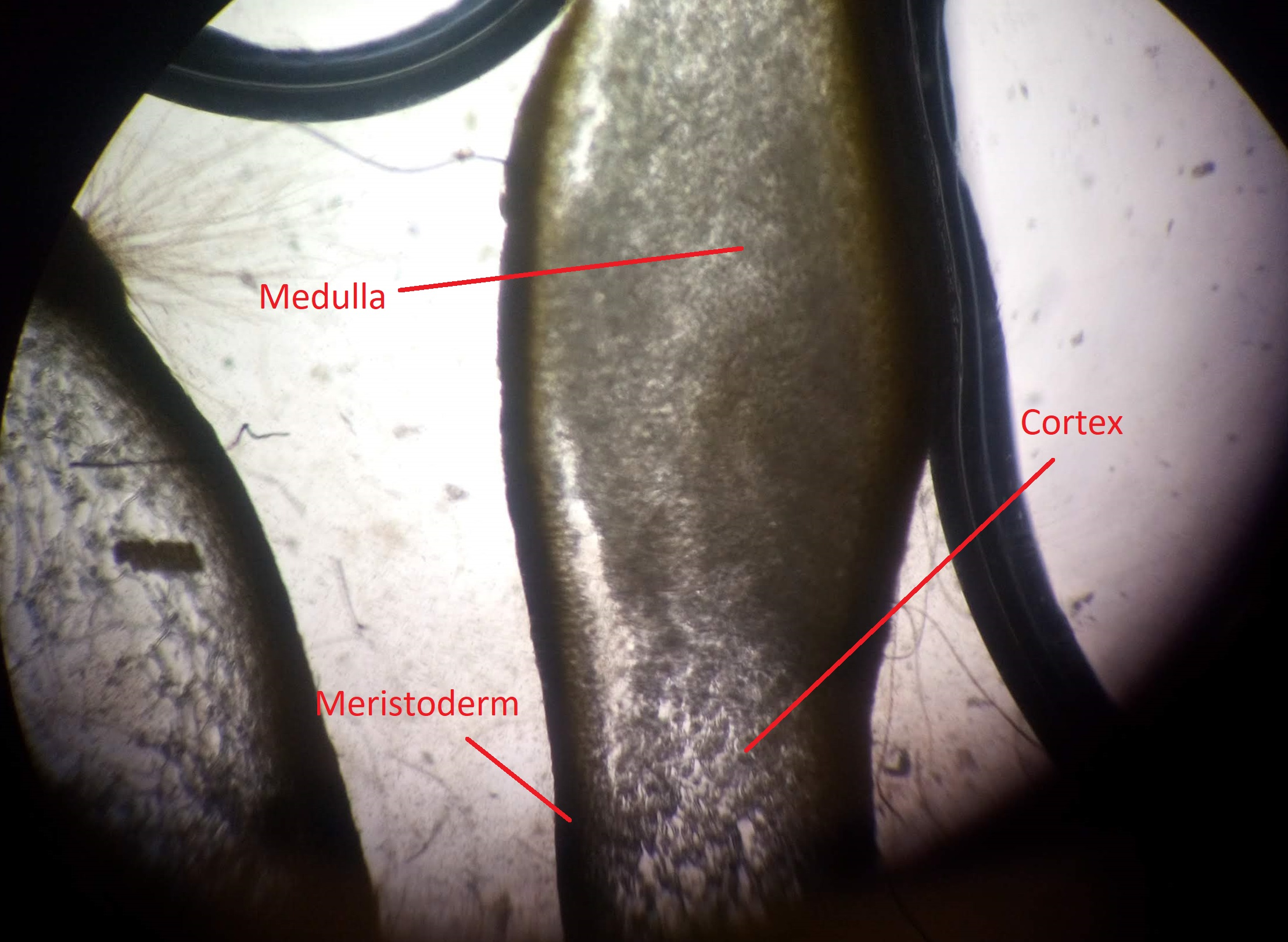
In this photograph of a horizontal cutting of the lower part of the blade (under an optic microscope) we can distinguish very well the medulla, the cortex and the meristoderm of F. spiralis. We can also see, by the disposition of the cells, some specialization and formation of proto-tissues.

Fucus spiralis is a species of seaweed, a brown alga (Heterokontophyta, Phaeophyceae), living on the littoral shore of the Atlantic coasts of Europe and North America. It has the common names of spiral wrack and flat wrack.

== Description ==
Fucus spiralis is olive brown in colour and similar to Fucus vesiculosus and Fucus serratus. It grows to about 30 cm long and branches somewhat irregularly dichotomous and is attached, generally to rock, by a discoid holdfast. The flattened blade has a distinct mid-rib and is usually spirally twisted without a serrated edge, as in Fucus serratus, and it does not show air-vesicles, as Fucus vesiculosus.

== Life history ==
The reproductive bodies form rounded swollen tips on the branches, usually in pairs. In the conceptacles oögonia and antheridia are produced after meiosis and then released. Fertilisation follows and the zygote develops directly into the diploid sporophyte plant.

== Ecology ==
The other common species of Fucus on the coasts of British Isles: Fucus spiralis, Fucus vesiculosus and Fucus serratus along with Ascophyllum nodosum form the main and dominant seaweeds on rocky shores. These three species, along with two others Pelvetia canaliculata and Ascophyllum nodosum form the zones along the shore.

== Distribution ==
F. spiralis is common on the coasts all around the British Isles, western coasts of Europe, Canary Islands and North-eastern America.

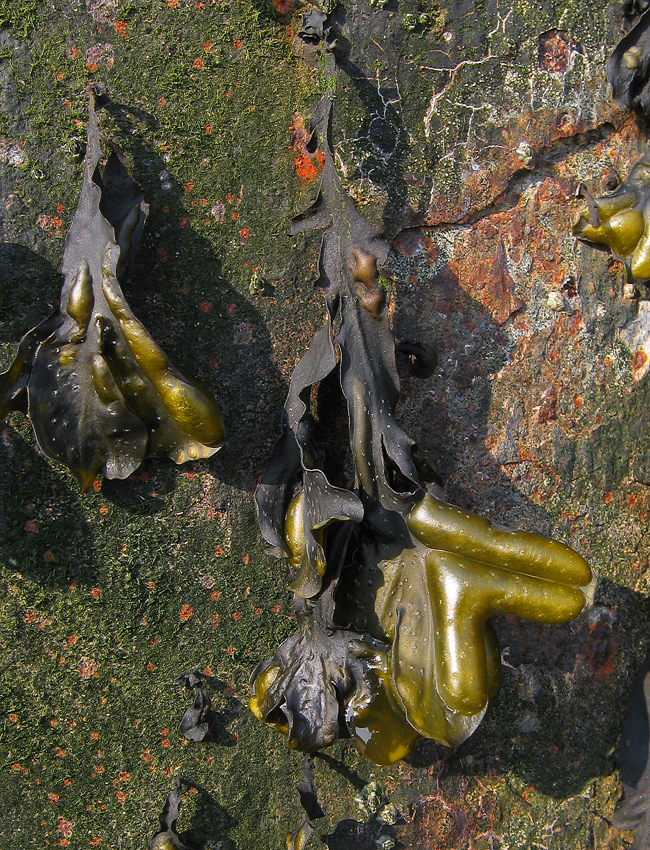
Fucus spiralis var. platycarpus

== Chemistry ==
Fucus spiralis produces phlorotannins of both the fucol and fucophlorethol types.

== See also ==
- Fucus vesiculosus
- Fucus serratus
