= Miramare Biosphere Reserve and Marine Reserve =

Coordinates: 45.4200°N 13.4200°E

The Miramare Biosphere Reserve and Marine Reserve is situated about 7 kilometres (4.3 mi) km from the city of Trieste on the Gulf of Trieste close to the Slovenian border. It represents a rocky promontory of karst with coastal cliffs and beaches. Marine habitats of special interest from a conservation perspective are the tidal zone which harbours many endemic species, such as Fucus virsoides, and undisturbed cliffs with a diverse benthic fauna. The aim of the biosphere reserve is to maintain biological diversity in the marine environment surrounding Trieste through scientific research and monitoring activities. Environmental education designed for students and the public is also a major activity in the area.

This small biosphere reserve (290 hectares) is not inhabited, however many tourists enjoy underwater tours or visit the castle and garden of the Habsburg family. Both commercial and amateur fishing as well as other recreational activities infringe on the marine habitat. One of the challenges of the biosphere reserve is to involve all stakeholders such as traditional fishermen and the local community, tourism industry, non-governmental organizations, universities and municipalities in the management of the biosphere reserve. The area is managed by the Italian World Wildlife Fund on behalf of Italy’s Ministry of the Environment and Protection of the Territory.

== Major habitats ==
Major habitats and land cover include Zostera marina and Cymodocea nodosa meadows, a tidal zone with endemic species such as Fucus virsoides, and Mediterranean sclerophyllous vegetation on terrestrial part.

== Sources ==
This article incorporates text from a free content work (license statement/permission). Text taken from UNESCO - MAB Biosphere Reserves Directory, UNESCO, UNESCO.
