= Conceptacle =

Specialized cavities in algae

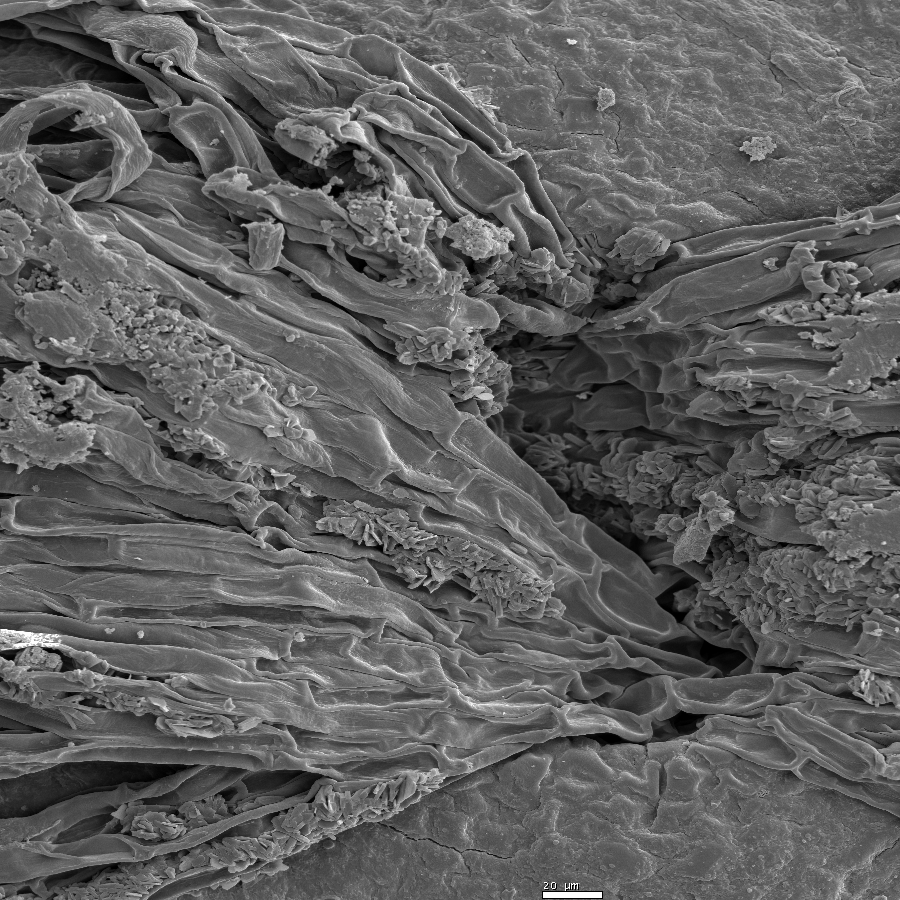
Conceptacle of Fucus

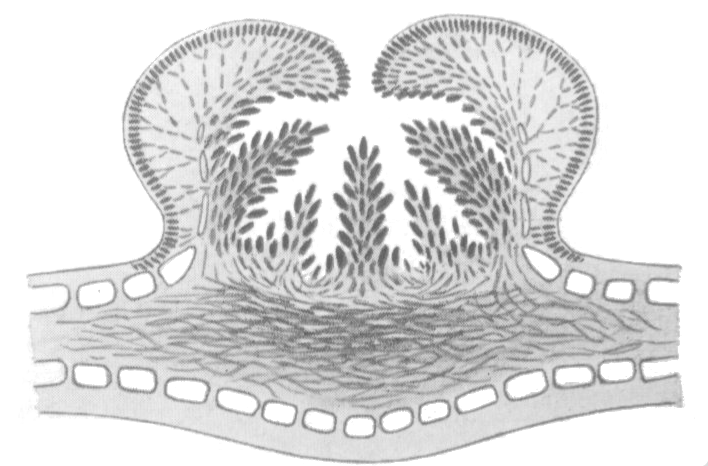
Cystocarp of Amphiplexia hymenocladioides

Conceptacles are specialized cavities of marine and freshwater algae that contain the reproductive organs. They are situated in the receptacle and open by a small ostiole. Conceptacles are present in Corallinaceae, and Hildenbrandiales, as well as the brown Fucales. In the Fucales there is no haploid phase in the reproductive cycle and therefore no alternation of generations. The thallus is a sporophyte. The diploid plants produce male (antheridia) and female (oogonia) gametangia by meiosis. The gametes are released into the surrounding water; after fusion, the zygote settles and begins growth.

Two taxa, the corallines and Hildenbrandiaceae, bear conceptacles, although the striking difference between their formation indicates that the conceptacles are not homologous. Similar structures also exist: cryptostomata are similar to conceptacles but differ having only hairs and are sterile; caecostomata, are found only in Fucus distichus, in these the ostiole becomes blocked during development.

== Morphology ==
Conceptacles can measure from 40–150 μm in diameter in some Hildenbrandiales. Some conceptacles are pits within the thallus, whereas others form raised domes protruding above it. Conceptacles open to the environment via one or many pores, depending on the species and the type of conceptacle.

=== Components ===
- Columella.

This is a central pillar constituting central calcified cells covered by cellular debris. These sterile cells rise up from the conceptacle floor to form a peak.

- Roof filaments.

Some conceptacles form by the centripetal expansion of a hole near the thallus surface; in such cases, a roof forms by nearby filaments arching over and establishing themselves as short (often 1–9 cells long) filaments that cover the chamber, leaving a central pore through which the spores can escape. If these filaments are vicarious they may produce a beak-like opening.

- Spores.

In asexual conceptacles, the spores tend to be large, and so are squeezed in, filling the conceptacle chamber "like orange segments".

== Types of conceptacle ==
There are a range of different conceptacles, classified according to the nature of the spores that they contain; some species may possess as many as four distinct types. For example, Lithophyllum incrustans bears asexual, male, female and cystocarpic (strictly, a type of female) conceptacles, discussed below.

- Asexual conceptacles.

These develop where weakly calcified cells break down to produce a cavity. In L. incrustans, Their columella is central and obvious (see above); it is accentuated by the spores (which may be bispores, tetraspores, etc.), which squeeze against the columella and conceptacle walls. Asexual conceptacles may be uniporate or multiporate.

- Sexual (male / female) conceptacles.

These lack a columella. L. incrustans has distinct male and female plants; the two conceptacle types never co-occur on the same thallus. Male conceptacles tend not to sit as deep within the thallus as female conceptacles; their size is similar although their shape tends to differ. Cells within circular regions within the perithallus lengthen to form sexual conceptacles, leaving long, wefty cells around the walls of the conceptacle. In the male conceptacles of Austrolithon, marginal filaments grow more quickly, bending in over the top of the conceptacle cavity and eventually setting up as distinct filaments that form the conceptacle roof.

- Cystocarpic conceptacles.

These are not associated with tissue demineralization; rather, they start to form at the centre (as a female conceptacle) and develop radially. Being mature female conceptacles, these too lack a columella.

== Development ==
In most coralline algae, a cluster of reproductive cells forms in the middle layer of the alga, and is engulfed by the surrounding tissue, which grows up and over the reproductive cells to form a roof and a uniporate conceptacle. Caps may subsequently develop to protect the opening. However the conceptacle may originate at any depth within the thallus, at the surface layer or at the basal perithallus.

Four different modes of asexual conceptacle formation exist. In Corallina and Bossiella,

In the coralline Bossiella, the conceptacle instead forms in the outer layer. A thickening forms, which separates the outer epithallium from the underlying cortex; this thickening and the overlying epithallium will end up being the cap of the conceptacle, and the underlying cells will develop to become reproductive initials. Once the cap is formed, the filamentous cells underneath begin to degrade. The tissue around the edge of the cap grows more quickly. This combination produces a chamber beneath the cap.

== Evolutionary history ==
Conceptacles appear in the fossil record at least as early as the Silurian. Similar structures have been noted in Prototaxites, which would imply that this giant land organism was not a simple fungus (as most paleontologists assume today) but a lichen.

== Similar structures ==
Similar structures also exist: cryptostomata are similar to conceptacles but differ having only hairs and are sterile; caecostomata, are found only in Fucus distichus, in these the ostiole becomes blocked during development.

=== Cryptostoma ===
Cryptostomata (singular: cryptostoma) are structures found in some types of brown algae.

The anatomical structures are found in some species of Fucus, but not in Pelvetia canaliculata. Cryptostomata are similar to conceptacles, but they are sterile cavities producing only hairs. They are found on the lamina of Fucus serratus. Colourless tufts of hairs can be seen issuing from them.

They are also sometimes referred to by the German name of Fasergrübchen.

== Further references ==
- https://web.archive.org/web/20120207133912/http://www.mbari.org/staff/conn/botany/browns/Cystoseira/lifehistory.htm
