= Evolutionary pressure =

Any cause that reduces reproductive success in a proportion of a population

Evolutionary pressure, selective pressure or selection pressure is any influence exerted on organisms by environmental factors that increase or decrease the reproductive success among portions of their population, thus driving various species' natural selection and evolution. It is a quantitative description of the amount of change occurring in processes investigated by evolutionary biology, but the formal concept is often extended to other areas of research.

In population genetics, selective pressure is usually expressed as a selection coefficient.

== Amino acids selective pressure ==
It has been shown that putting an amino acid bio-synthesizing gene like HIS4 gene under amino acid selective pressure in yeast causes enhancement of expression of adjacent genes which is due to the transcriptional co-regulation of two adjacent genes in Eukaryota.

== Antibiotic resistance ==
Drug resistance in bacteria is an example of an outcome of natural selection. When a drug is used on a species of bacteria, those that cannot resist die and do not produce offspring, while those that survive potentially pass on the resistance gene to the next generation (vertical gene transmission). The resistance gene can also be passed on to one bacterium by another of a different species (horizontal gene transmission). Because of this, the drug resistance increases over generations. For example, in hospitals, environments are created where pathogens such as C. difficile have developed a resistance to antibiotics. Antibiotic resistance is made worse by the misuse of antibiotics. Antibiotic resistance is encouraged when antibiotics are used to treat non-bacterial diseases, and when antibiotics are not used for the prescribed amount of time or in the prescribed dose. Antibiotic resistance may arise out of standing genetic variation in a population or de novo mutations in the population. Either pathway could lead to antibiotic resistance, which may be a form of evolutionary rescue.

=== Nosocomial infections ===
Clostridioides difficile, gram-positive bacteria species that inhabits the gut of mammals, exemplifies one type of bacteria that is a major cause of death by nosocomial infections.

When symbiotic gut flora populations are disrupted (e.g., by antibiotics), one becomes more vulnerable to pathogens. The rapid evolution of antibiotic resistance places an enormous selective pressure on the advantageous alleles of resistance passed down to future generations. The Red Queen hypothesis shows that the evolutionary arms race between pathogenic bacteria and humans is a constant battle for evolutionary advantages in outcompeting each other. The evolutionary arms race between the rapidly evolving virulence factors of the bacteria and the treatment practices of modern medicine requires evolutionary biologists to understand the mechanisms of resistance in these pathogenic bacteria, especially considering the growing number of infected hospitalized patients. The evolved virulence factors pose a threat to patients in hospitals, who are immunocompromised from illness or antibiotic treatment. Virulence factors are the characteristics that the evolved bacteria have developed to increase pathogenicity. One of the virulence factors of C. difficile that largely constitutes its resistance to antibiotics is its toxins: enterotoxin TcdA and cytotoxin TcdB. Toxins produce spores that are difficult to inactivate and remove from the environment. This is especially true in hospitals where an infected patient's room may contain spores for up to 20 weeks. Combating the threat of the rapid spread of CDIs is therefore dependent on hospital sanitation practices removing spores from the environment. A study published in the American Journal of Gastroenterology found that to control the spread of CDIs glove use, hand hygiene, disposable thermometers and disinfection of the environment are necessary practices in health facilities. The virulence of this pathogen is remarkable and may take a radical change at sanitation approaches used in hospitals to control CDI outbreaks.

== Natural selection in humans ==
The malaria parasite can exert a selective pressure on human populations. This pressure has led to natural selection for erythrocytes carrying the sickle cell hemoglobin gene mutation (Hb S)—causing sickle cell anaemia—in areas where malaria is a major health concern, because the condition grants some resistance to this infectious disease.

== Resistance to herbicides and pesticides ==
Just as with the development of antibiotic resistance in bacteria, resistance to pesticides and herbicides has begun to appear with commonly used agricultural chemicals. For example:

- In the US, studies have shown that fruit flies that infest orange groves were becoming resistant to malathion, a pesticide used to kill them.
- In Hawaii and Japan, the diamondback moth developed a resistance to Bacillus thuringiensis, which is used in several commercial crops including Bt corn, about three years after it began to be used heavily.
- In England, rats in certain areas have developed such a strong resistance to rat poison that they can consume up to five times as much of it as normal rats without dying.
- DDT is no longer effective in controlling mosquitoes that transmit malaria in some places, a fact that contributed to a resurgence of the disease.
- In the southern United States, the weed Amaranthus palmeri, which interferes with production of cotton, has developed widespread resistance to the herbicide glyphosate.
- In the Baltic Sea, decreases in salinity has encouraged the emergence of a new species of brown seaweed, Fucus radicans.

== Humans exerting evolutionary pressure ==
Human activity can lead to unintended changes in the environment. The human activity will have a possible negative effect on a certain population, causing many individuals from said population to die due to not being adapted to this new pressure. The individuals that are better adapted to this new pressure will survive and reproduce at a higher rate than those who are at a disadvantage. This occurs over many generations until the population as a whole is better adapted to the pressure. This is natural selection at work, but the pressure is coming from man-made activity such as building roads or hunting. This is seen in the below examples of cliff swallows and elk. However, not all human activity that causes an evolutionary pressure happens unintentionally. This is demonstrated in dog domestication and the subsequent selective breeding that resulted in the various breeds known today.

=== Rattlesnakes ===
In more heavily (human) populated and trafficked areas, reports have been increasing of rattlesnakes that do not rattle. This phenomenon is commonly attributed to selective pressure by humans, who often kill the snakes when they are discovered. Non-rattling snakes are more likely to go unnoticed, so survive to reproduce offspring that, like themselves, are less likely to rattle.

=== Cliff swallows ===
Populations of cliff swallows in Nebraska have displayed morphological changes in their wings after many years of living next to roads. Collecting data for over 30 years, researchers noticed a decline in wingspan of living swallow populations, while also noting a decrease in the number of cliff swallows killed by passing cars. Those cliff swallows that were killed by passing cars showed a larger wingspan than the population as a whole. Confounding effects such as road usage, car size, and population size were shown to have no impact on the study.

=== Elk ===
Evolutionary pressure imposed by humans is also seen in elk populations. These studies do not look at morphological differences, but behavioral differences. Faster and more mobile male elk were shown to be more likely to fall prey to hunters. The hunters create an environment where the more active animals are more likely to succumb to predation than less active animals. Female elk who survived past two years, would decrease their activity as each year passed, leaving more shy female elk that were more likely to survive. Female elk in a separate study also showed behavioral differences, with older females displaying the timid behavior that one would expect from this selection.

=== Dog domestication ===
Since the domestication of dogs, they have evolved alongside humans due to pressure from humans and the environment. This began by humans and wolves sharing the same area, with a pressure to coexist eventually leading to their domestication. Evolutionary pressure from humans led to many different breeds that paralleled the needs of the time, whether it was a need for protecting livestock or assisting in the hunt. Hunting and herding were a couple of the first reasons for humans artificially selecting for traits they deemed beneficial. This selective breeding does not stop there, but extends to humans selecting for certain traits deemed desirable in their domesticated dogs, such as size and color, even if they are not necessarily beneficial to the human in a tangible way. An unintended consequence of this selection is that domesticated dogs also tend to have heritable diseases depending on what specific breed they encompass.

== See also ==
- Fitness (biology) – Expected reproductive success
- Survival of the fittest – Phrase to describe the mechanism of natural selection
- Conserved sequence – Similar DNA, RNA or protein sequences within genomes or among species
