= Lena Bergström =

Swedish designer

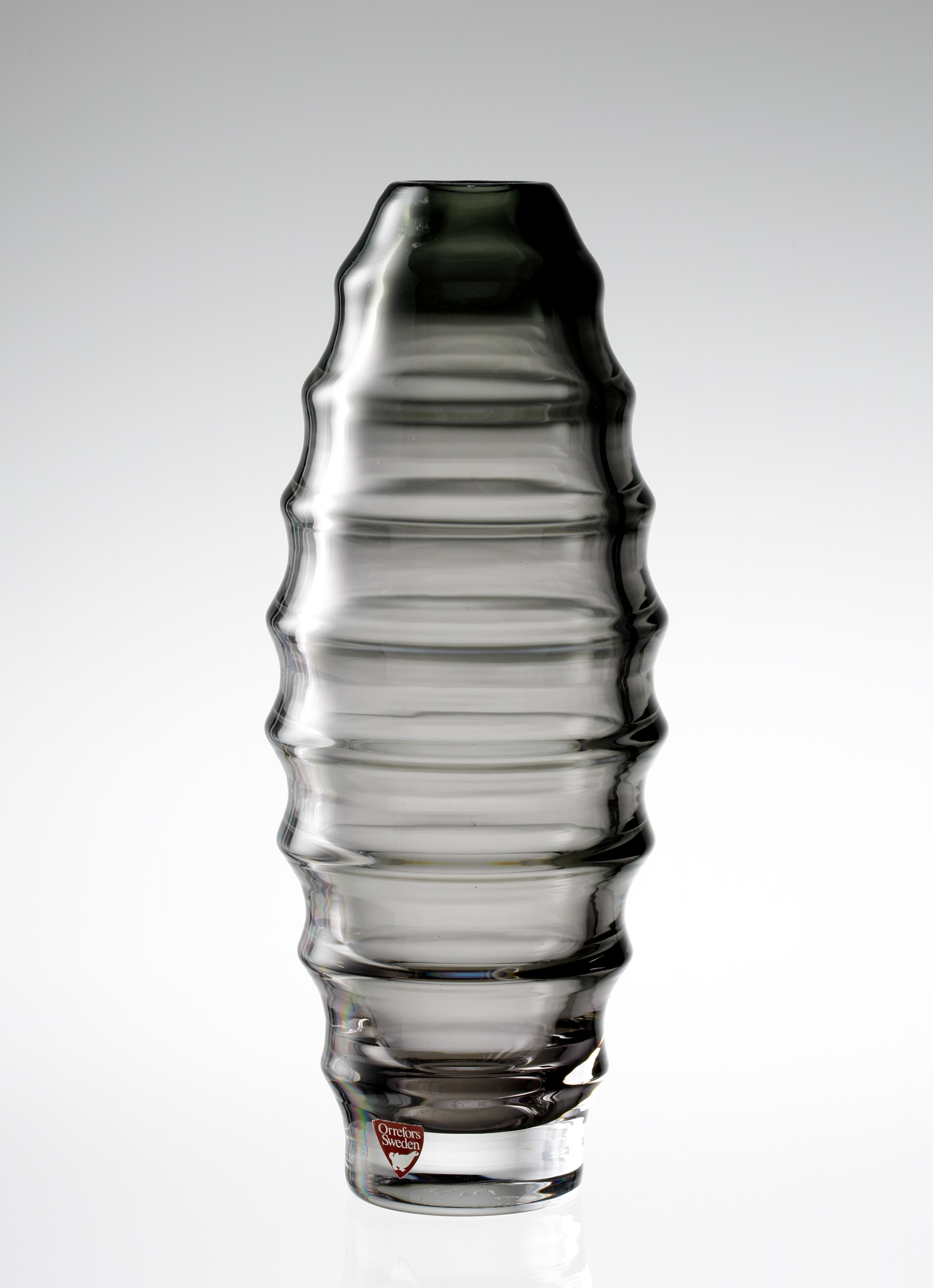
Glass vase Havanna designed by Lena Bergström for Orrefors Glassworks, 1996

Lena Bergström (born 1961 in Umeå) is a Swedish textiles and glass designer.

== Biography ==
After high school, Bergström started working as a decorator at Domus department store. She moved to Stockholm to study at various art & crafts schools, and eventually started at Konstfack, the University college of art, crafts and design in Stockholm. Bergström describes her studies as interdisciplinary, which is also shown in her work. After graduating at Konstfack in 1989, Bergström started working as a freelance designer. She got her breakthrough in 1992 with the textile collection X-tra, O-lik och I-hop for textile manufacturer Ljungbergs, which was awarded Excellent Swedish Design. The success continued with an exhibition at the Swedish Pavilion at the Seville World Exhibition. The next year she was awarded Excellent Swedish Design once again for the collection "Ume, Lule, Pite"; a development of her graduation project at Konstfack.

In 1994, Bergström got employed by Swedish crystal manufacturer Orrefors, and she has been a member of their staff ever since then. For Orrefors, Bergström designed several prize-winning products such as the Havanna and Drop collections, the crystal vase Squeeze in 1997, the votive Puck in 1999.

Besides her career as a glass designer, Bergström has also continued working with textiles, for companies such as Ljungbergs textiltryck, Designer's Eye, SAAB, and Design House Stockholm.

Lena Bergström is represented at the Nationalmuseum in Stockholm, The Röhsska Museum of Fashion, Design and Decorative Arts in Gothenburg, the Cleveland Museum of Art in the United States, and the Victoria and Albert Museum in London.

== Style ==
Bergström’s textile work is distinguished by its graphic qualities, while her glass and crystal designs are often soft and organic. In her own words, she likes soft glass, and hard textiles. She also appreciates mistakes in the process; the vase Squeeze is a result of an accident that occurred in the glassworks while losing concentration at work – the result was a deformed, waving vase, that was awarded Excellent Swedish Design.

== Awards ==
Bergström has received numerous awards, including 12 Excellent Swedish Design; ELLE Decoration Design Award, UK 2002; Swedish ELLE Interiör Design Award 2003 & 2006. She was shortlisted for the Bombay Sapphire Prize both in 2002 and 2005.
