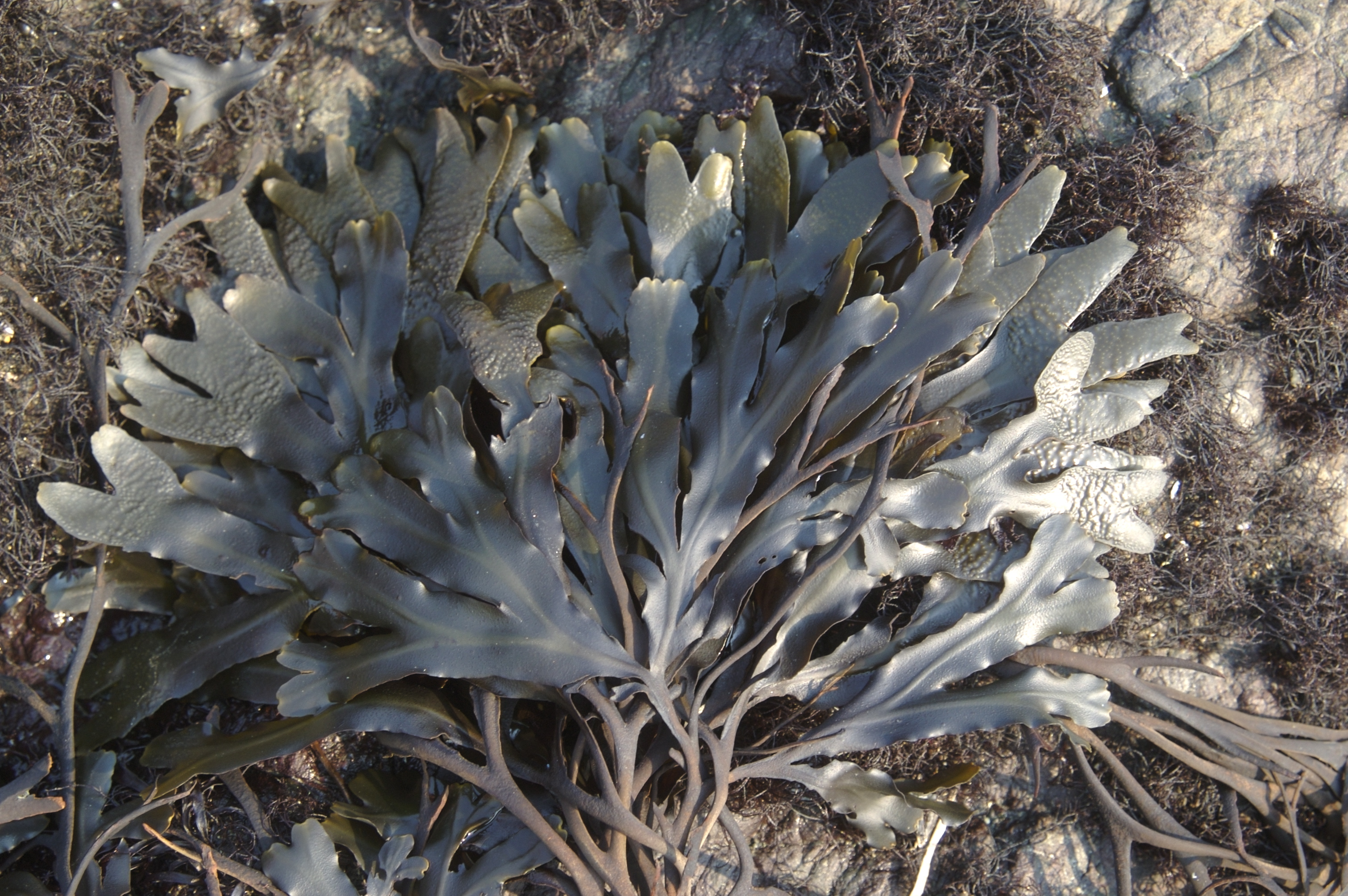

Scientific classification
- Domain: Eukaryota
- Clade: Sar
- Clade: Stramenopiles
- Division: Ochrophyta
- Class: Phaeophyceae
- Order: Fucales
- Family: Fucaceae
- Genus: Fucus
- Species: F. distichus

Binomial name
- Fucus distichus L.

Synonyms
- Fucus linearis Oeder, 1767; Fucus furcatus C.Agardh, 1820; Fucus fueci Bachelot de la Pylaie, 1830; Fucus miclonensis Bachelot de la Pylaie, 1830; Fucus anceps Harvey & Ward ex Carruthers, 1864; Virsodes furcatum Kuntze, 1891; Virsodes distichum (Linnaeus) Kuntze, 1891; Fucus nitens N.L.Gardner, 1922

= Fucus distichus =

Species of alga

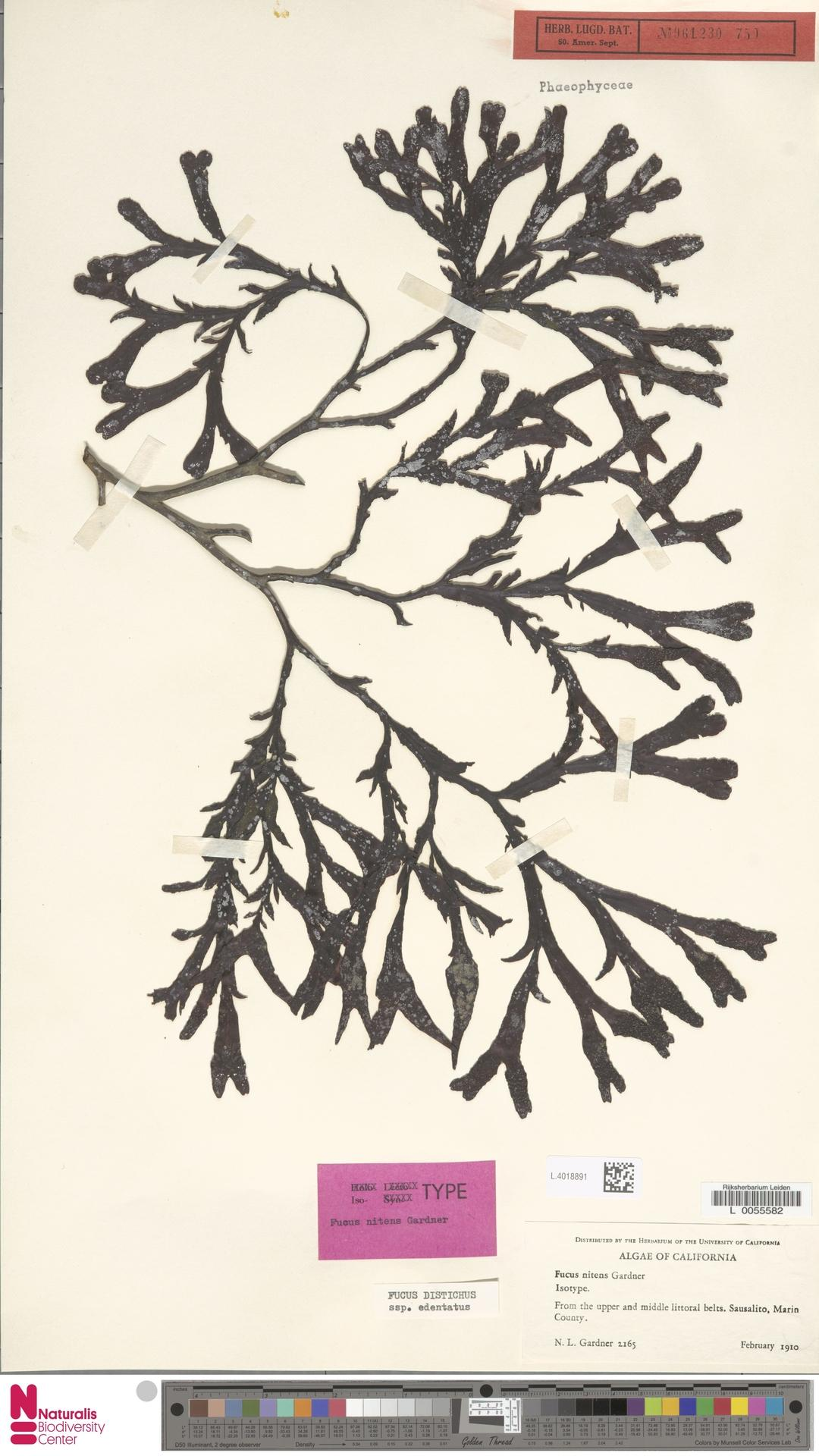
Fucus distichus L. subsp. edentatus (Bach.Pyl.) Powell, isotype herbarium specimen, 1910

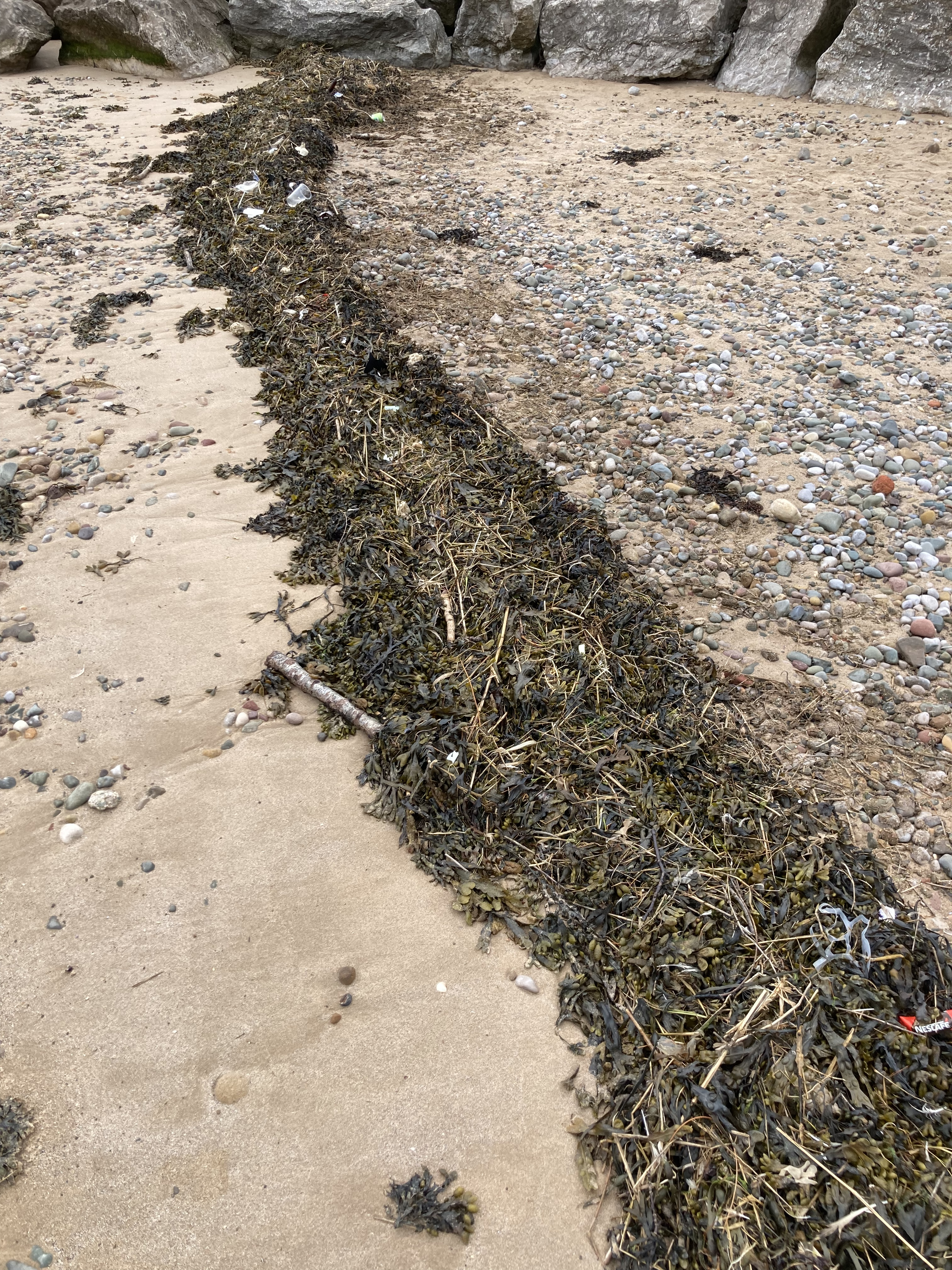
Fucus distichus (rockweed) washed up at the high tide line at Morecambe Bay, England, along with other debris.

Fucus distichus or rockweed is a species of brown alga in the family Fucaceae to be found in the intertidal zones of rocky seashores in the Northern Hemisphere, mostly in rock pools.

== Description ==
This is a small tufted brown alga. The fronds are rarely more than 4 mm wide narrow and grow up to thirty centimetres long. They do not include airbladders as in some other species of Fucus. The fronds are fairly rigid and cartilaginous, partially flattened, and olive green to yellowish green in colour. The plant is branched and has a basal discoid holdfast. The midrib is conspicuous and near the holdfast the stalk is narrowed because of the thickening of the midrib and the erosion of the margins. The apices of the frond are rounded and the swollen receptacles at the tips are yellowish and up to six centimetres long.

Two sub-species have been recorded from Great Britain and Ireland: F. distichus ssp. anceps and F. distichus ssp. edentates, each with a distinctive form.

The brown colour is due to the xanthophyll, fucoxanthin which masks the colour of the other pigments, beta-carotene, chlorophyll a and c and other xanthophylls. Fucus distichus has a high content of phlorotannins which may protect larger plants from grazing by periwinkles though young plants are susceptible.

== Distribution ==
In Great Britain, rockweed is found on northern coasts of Scotland and the north and west coasts of Ireland where it is found on rock faces and in rock pools in the upper littoral zone. It also occurs on the eastern coast of North America and on the west coast from Alaska to California.

== Biology ==
Like other brown algae, there is an alternation of haploid and diploid generations. The haploid thalli form isogamous, anisogamous or oogamous gametes and the diploid thalli form zoospores by meiosis. Reproduction is seasonal, and receptacles start being formed in late autumn in response to short days. The gametes are of both sexes and when released, ova can survive and disperse for several days. It is thought that self-fertilisation often occurs in this species and once a zygote is formed it can only be dispersed over a limited distance. The plant dies back after reproducing and gets washed from its rock substrate by waves during the following winter.

A study was undertaken to see what factors influenced natural gamete release and the rate of fertilisation success in Fucus distichus. The study sites were rock pools on the coast of Maine. It was found that the release and settlement of eggs and zygotes occurred during daytime low tide periods, particularly when these fell between 10am and 2pm. Few gametes were released during the night time low tide period nor during the daytime period around noon when there was not a low tide. There was no correlation between the temperature or salinity of the water and gamete release and only a weak association with the lunar phase, few gametes being released around the times of full and new moons. The study showed that fertilisation was successful and in the range 80% to 100% in F. distichus due to the avoidance of gamete release when the water velocity is high under the turbulent conditions of high tide.

It has been found that this species grows more abundantly on sloped than on vertical rock faces. Its presence increases species richness as it forms canopies in the mid to high intertidal zone that provide protection, shelter and food for a variety of small invertebrates including many gastropods and crustaceans.
