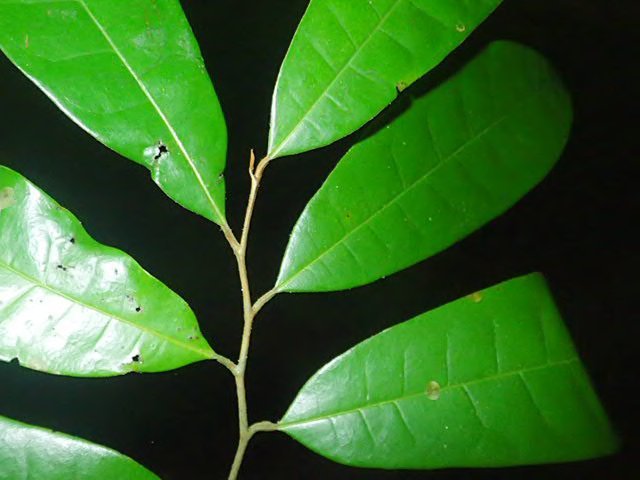
- Leaves of Meiocarpidium lepidotum.

Scientific classification
- Kingdom: Plantae
- Clade: Tracheophytes
- Clade: Angiosperms
- Clade: Magnoliids
- Order: Magnoliales
- Family: Annonaceae
- Genus: Meiocarpidium
- Species: M. lepidotum

Binomial name
- Meiocarpidium lepidotum (Oliv.) Engl. & Diels

Synonyms
- Unona lepidota Oliv. Uvaria zenkeri Engl.

= Meiocarpidium lepidotum =

Species of plant native to Africa

Meiocarpidium lepidotum is a species of plant in the family Annonaceae. It is native to Cameroon, The Central African Republic, The Republic of the Congo, and Gabon. Daniel Oliver, the English botanist who first formally described the species using the basionym Unona lepidota, named it after rust-colored, shiny scales (Latinized form of Greek λεπίς, lepis) on its branchlets, the underside of its leaves and its buds.

== Description ==
It is a tree reaching 25 feet (7.6 m) in height. Its leathery leaves are 5–7 by 1.5–2 inches, and smooth on their upper surface. Its solitary flowers occur in extra-axillary positions and are bisexual. Its 3 sepals are oval to triangular in shape with edges that touch one another. It has 6 cream-colored petals arranged in two rows of three. The petals are roughly equal in size an have been observed adhering to one another at their apices to form a chamber around the reproductive structures. Its flowers have numerous stamen. Its flowers have 3–5 carpels. Its ovules are arranged in to rows positioned ventrally in ovaries. Its fruit have numerous seeds in a single row. The brown seeds are oval, rounded on one side and angled on the other.

=== Reproductive biology ===
The pollen of M. lepidotum is shed as permanent tetrads.

== Uses ==
Bioactive molecules extracted from its bark have been reported to have analgesic, anti-inflammatory and antidepressant activities in tests with mice.
