= Excellent Swedish Design =

Swedish design award (1983–2002)

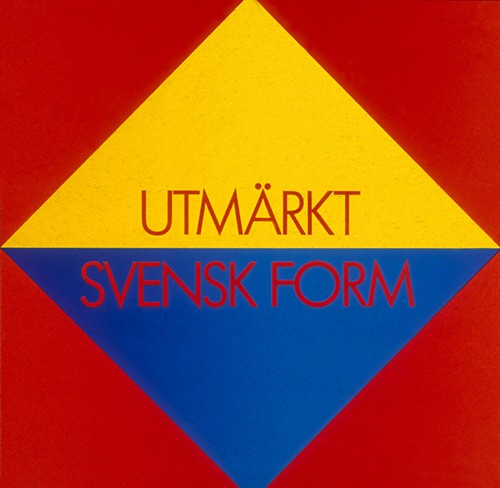
- Native name: Utmärkt Svensk Form
- Description: Recognition of Swedish design across various professional disciplines
- Country: Sweden
- Presented by: Svensk Form (Swedish Society of Crafts and Design)

Excellent Swedish Design (Utmärkt Svensk Form) was a design award handed out by the Swedish Society of Crafts and Design (Svensk Form) 1983-2002

In the early 1980s, the opportunities for designers in Sweden were scarce. Few companies had realized the importance of consulting a designer. The chairman of the designers section of Svensk Form, Hans-Christer Ericson, then presented the idea of a design prize, to be awarded to various professional design organizations and their producers. In 1983 the first jury presented their choice, and after that the prize was handed out every year until 2002. The graphic designers (ABCD, now Sveriges Reklamförbund), the industrial designers (SID), the interior architects (SIR), the craftsmen (KIF), the illustrators (FST) and the textile and fashion designers (STOK) every time chose their representative for the jury. In later years, web design and corporate identity were also awarded.

From 2005 onwards the award has been replaced by national design awards Design S and Young Swedish Form (Ung Svensk Form).

== Sources ==
- Svensk Forms webpage
- Svensk Form pdf
- Young Swedish Form Award
