= Reproductive initials =

Filaments in the skin of algae and fungi

Reproductive initials, or gonidial initials, are filaments below the cuticle surface of algae and fungi which give rise to the bulbs of spore-producing cells (in fungi, conidiophores).
