= Jean Feldmann =

French biologist (1905–1978)

Jean Feldmann (1905–1978) was a French biologist, specialising in marine algae.

== Biography ==
Jean Feldmann was born on 25 June 1905 in Paris. He initially studied pharmacy, gaining his first degree in 1929, before turning his attentions to marine algae. In 1933, he took up a position as an assistant at the University of Algiers, where he also completed his doctorate in 1937, married his assistant, Geneviève Mazoyer, in 1938, and rose to professor in 1948. The couple moved to Paris when Jean took up a position at the institution that became the Université Pierre et Marie Curie, where they remained until his retirement in 1976. He died suddenly on 18 September 1978.

== Work ==
Feldmann published around 220 scientific works, mostly on marine algae, but also covering various fungi, mosses, freshwater algae and flowering plants. Feldmann strongly believed in international scientific co-operation and, as well as co-founding the Société Phycologique de France in 1955, strongly advocated the foundation of an International Phycological Society, of which he served as the first president from its foundation in 1961 until his retirement.
