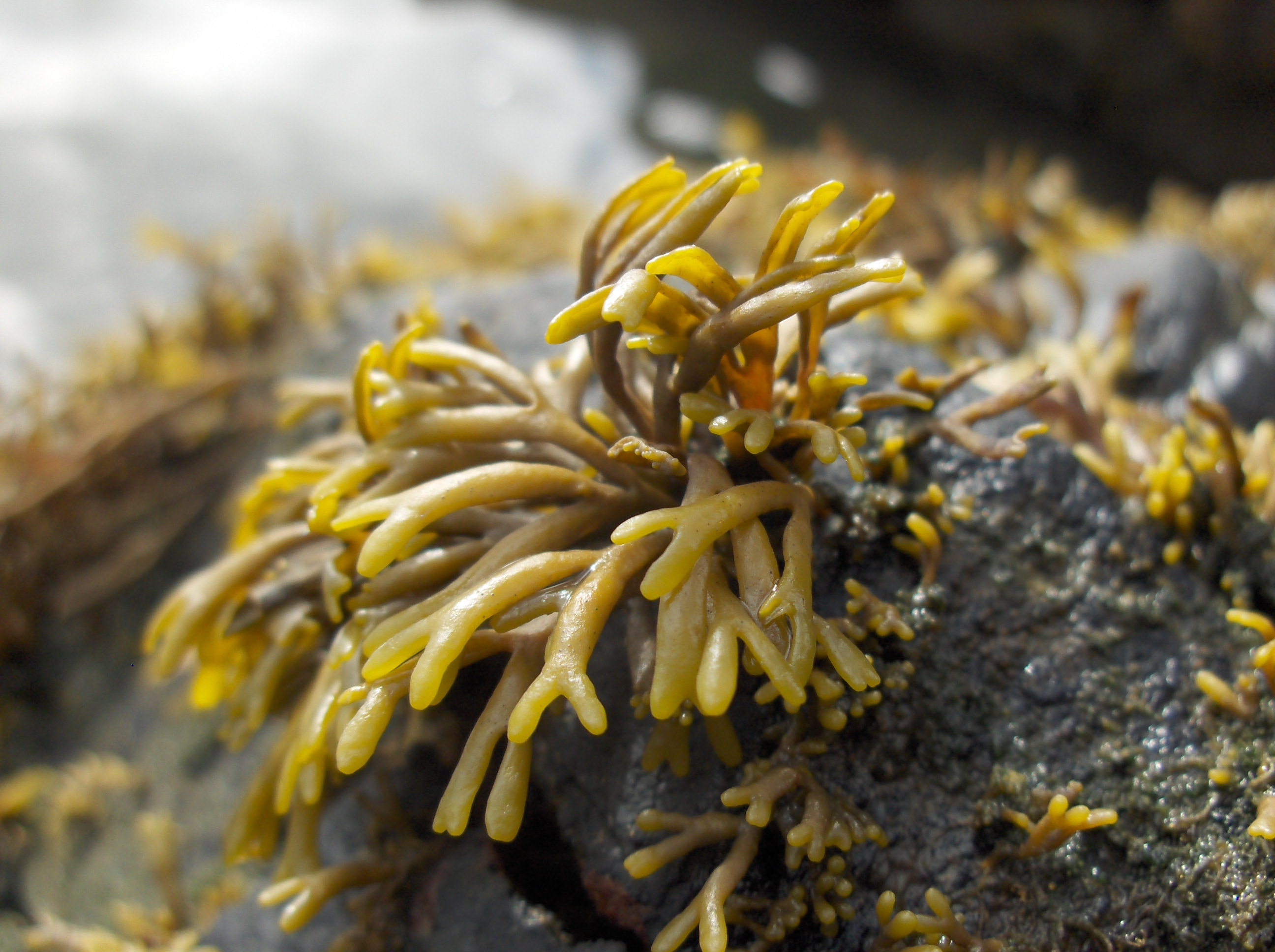
- Close-up
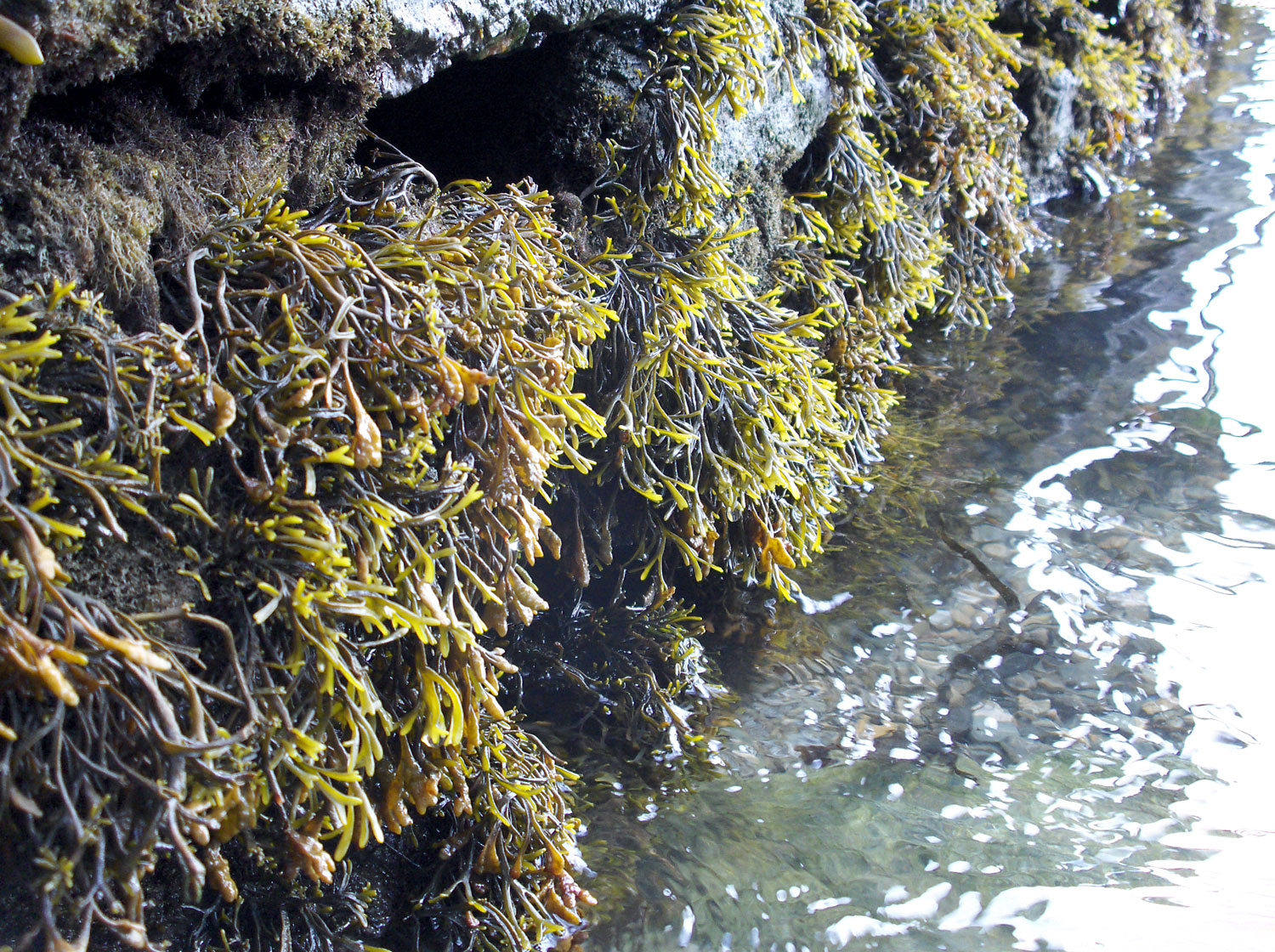
- Growing on the side of a slipway

Scientific classification
- Domain: Eukaryota
- Clade: Diaphoretickes
- Clade: SAR
- Clade: Stramenopiles
- Phylum: Gyrista
- Subphylum: Ochrophytina
- Class: Phaeophyceae
- Order: Fucales
- Family: Fucaceae
- Genus: Pelvetia; Decne. & Thur.
- Species: P. canaliculata

Binomial name
- Pelvetia canaliculata (L.) Decne. & Thur.

Synonyms
- Fucus canaliculatus L.; Halidrys canaliculata (L.) Stackhouse; Fucodium canaliculatum (L.) J.Agardh; Ascophyllum canaliculatum (L.) Kuntze; Ascophylla canaliculata (L.) Kuntze; Fucus excisus L.

= Pelvetia =

Genus of seaweeds

Pelvetia canaliculata, the channelled wrack, is a very common brown alga (Phaeophyceae) found on the rocks of the upper shores of Europe. It is the only species remaining in the monotypic genus Pelvetia. In 1999, the other members of this genus were reclassified as Silvetia due to differences of oogonium structure and of nucleic acid sequences of the rDNA.

== Description ==
Pelvetia grows to a maximum length of 15 centimetres (6 in) in dense tufts, the fronds being deeply channeled on one side: the channels and a mucus layer help prevent the seaweed drying (desiccation) when the tide is out. It is irregularly dichotomously branched with terminal receptacles, and is dark brown in color. Each branch is of uniform width and without a midrib. The receptacles are forked at the tips.

It is distinguished from other large brown algae by the channels along the frond. It has no mid-rib, no air-vesicles and no cryptostomata. It forms the uppermost zone of algae on the shore growing at or above high-water mark. The reproductive organs form swollen, irregularly shaped receptacles at the end of the branches. The conceptacles are hermaphrodite and borne within the receptacles at the apices.

== Taxonomy ==
The genus name of Pelvetia is in honour of François Alexandre Pelvet (1801–1882), who was a French naturalist and plant collector.

The genus was circumscribed by Joseph Decaisne and Gustave Adolphe Thuret in Ann. Sci. Nat. Bot. ser. 3, vol. 3 on page 12 in 1845.

== Reproduction ==
Both sexes occur in the same plant, the reproductive structures develop at the apices. The receptacles are swollen during the summer and are yellowish-green at maturity.

== Ecology ==
Pelvetia canaliculata is the only large algae growing on rocks forming a zone along the upper shore at the upper littoral zone, on the shores of the British Isles. It tolerates a wide range of exposure conditions. It needs periods of exposure to the air, and sometimes grows so high up a beach that coarse grass and other longshore angiosperms grow among it. If it is submerged for more than six hours out of 12 it begins to decay.

== Distribution ==
Pelvetia canaliculata is common on the Atlantic shores of Europe from Iceland to Spain, including Norway, Ireland, Great Britain, the Netherlands, France and Portugal. In Ireland, collection of Pelvetia canaliculata (Irish: dúlamán) has been recorded as a source of sustenance during times of famine. A popular Irish folk song, Dúlamán, describes events transpiring between two people who collected the seaweed as a profession.
