= Receptacle (botany) =

Cardinal organ part of lower plants

In botany, the receptacle refers to vegetative tissues near the end of reproductive stems that are situated below or encase the reproductive organs.

== Angiosperms ==
Angiosperms The receptacle (grey) in relation to the ovary (red) in three types of flowers: hypogynous (I), perigynous (II), and epigynous (III)

In angiosperms, the receptacle or torus (an older term is thalamus, as in Thalamiflorae) is the thickened part of a stem (pedicel) from which the flower organs grow. In some accessory fruits, for example the pome and strawberry, the receptacle gives rise to the edible part of the fruit. The fruit of Rubus species is a cluster of drupelets on top of a conical receptacle. When a raspberry is picked, the receptacle separates from the fruit, but in blackberries, it remains attached to the fruit.

In the daisy family (Compositae or Asteraceae), small individual flowers are arranged on a round or dome-like structure that is also called receptacle.

== Algae and bryophyta ==
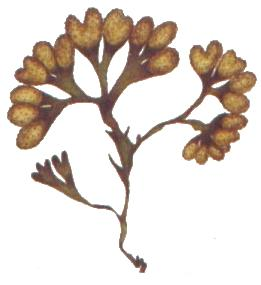
Algae Receptacles at the end of Fucus branches

In phycology, receptacles occur at the ends of branches of algae mainly in the brown algae or Heterokontophyta in the order Fucales. They are specialised structures which contain the reproductive organs called conceptacles. Receptacles also function as a structure that captures food.
