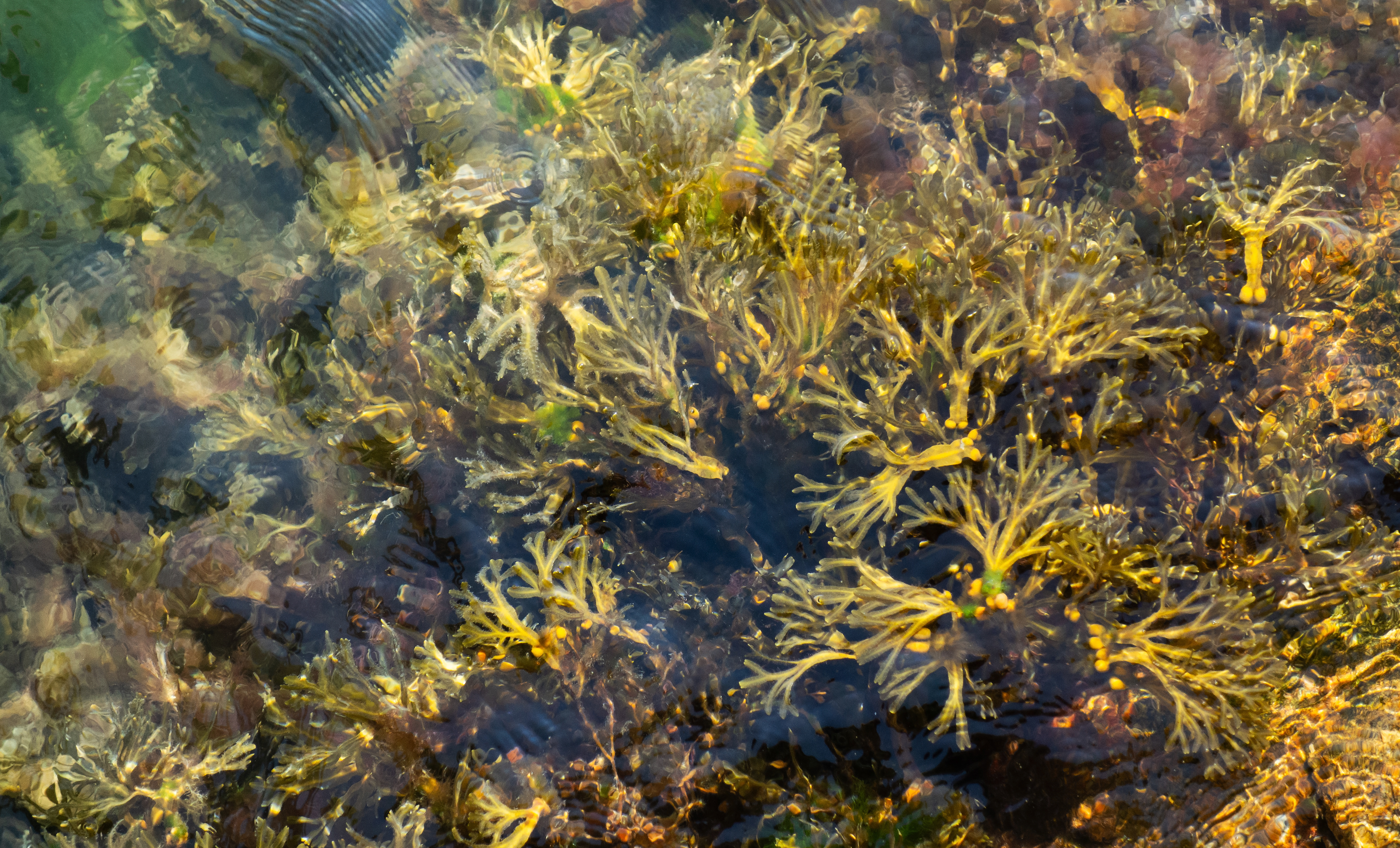

Scientific classification
- Domain: Eukaryota
- Supergroup: Stramenopiles
- Division: Ochrophyta
- Class: Phaeophyceae
- Order: Fucales
- Family: Fucaceae
- Genus: Fucus
- Species: F. vesiculosus

Binomial name
- Fucus vesiculosus L.

= Fucus vesiculosus =

Species of seaweed

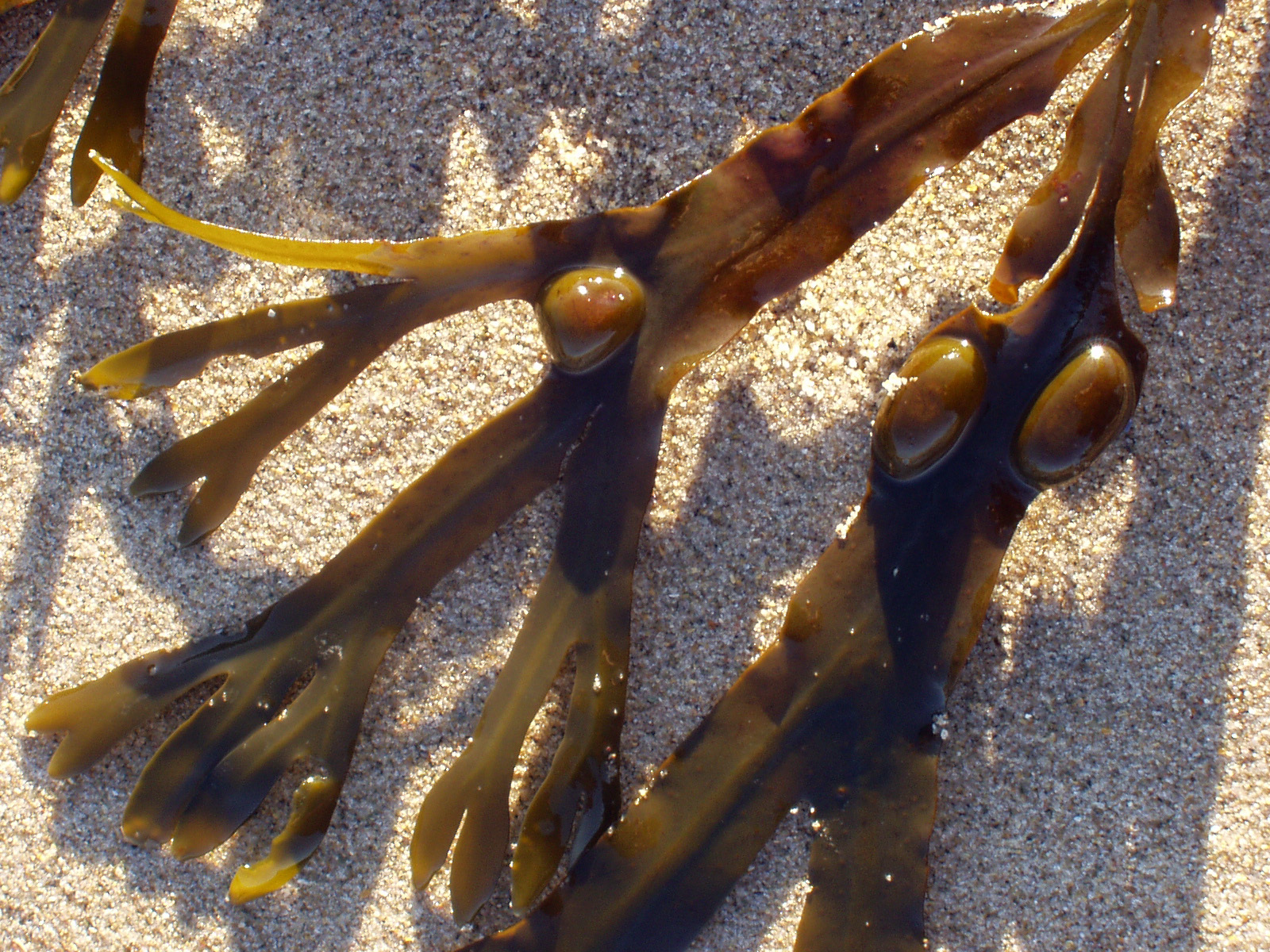
Bladder wrack is named for its conspicuous air vesicles

Fucus vesiculosus, known by the common names bladderwrack, black tang, rockweed, sea grapes, bladder fucus, sea oak, cut weed, dyers fucus, red fucus and rock wrack, is a brown alga (a seaweed) found on the coasts of the North Sea, the western Baltic Sea and the Atlantic and Pacific Oceans. It was the original source of iodine, discovered in 1811, and was used extensively to treat goitre.

== Description ==
The fronds of F. vesiculosus grow to 150 cm (59 in) long and 2.5 cm (1 in) wide and have a prominent midrib throughout. It is typically attached by a basal disc-shaped holdfast but can also be unattached. It has almost spherical air bladders, which are usually paired one on either side of the mid-rib but may be absent in young plants. The margin is smooth and the frond is dichotomously branched. It is sometimes confused with Fucus spiralis with which it hybridises and is similar to Fucus serratus.

=== Biology ===
Plants of F. vesiculosus are dioecious. Gametes are generally released into the seawater under calm conditions, and the eggs are fertilized externally to produce a zygote. Eggs are fertilized shortly after being released from the receptacle. A study on the coast of Maine showed that there was 100% fertilization at both exposed and sheltered sites. Continuously submerged populations in the Baltic Sea are very responsive to turbulent conditions. High fertilization success is achieved because the gametes are released only when water velocities are low.

Individuals of F. vesiculosus from the North Sea colonized the Baltic Sea less than 8,000 years ago. The event is paralleled by a switch from what seems to be obligate sexual recruitment to facultative asexual recruitment. Asexual reproduction in Baltic Sea populations is accomplished by the production of adventitious branches that come loose and reattach to the bottom by the formation of rhizoids. Asexual reproduction is also important for maintaining unattached populations. Adventitious branches are present in thalli of F. vesiculosus in other areas too but asexual formation of new thalli has never been reported outside the Baltic Sea.

== Distribution ==
Fucus vesiculosus is a common large brown alga on the shores of the British Isles. It has been recorded from the Atlantic shores of Europe, Northern Russia, the Baltic Sea, Greenland, Azores, Canary Islands, Morocco and Madeira. It is also found on the Atlantic coast of North America from Ellesmere Island, Hudson Bay to North Carolina.

== Ecology ==
The species is especially common on sheltered shores from the middle littoral to lower intertidal levels. It is rare on exposed shores, where any specimens may be short, stunted and without the air vesicles. F. vesiculosus supports few colonial organisms but provides a canopy and shelter for the tube worm Spirorbis spirorbis, herbivorous isopods such as Idotea and surface-grazing snails such as Littorina obtusata. Phlorotannins in Fucus vesiculosus act as chemical defenses against the marine herbivorous snail Littorina littorea, while galactolipids act as herbivore deterrents against the sea urchin Arbacia punctulata. Methyl jasmonate may induce the phlorotannins production. Fucophlorethol A is a type of phlorotannin found in F. vesiculosus.

== Uses ==
Fucus vesiculosus can be cooked and eaten.

It was the original source of iodine, discovered in 1811, and was used extensively to treat goitre, a swelling of the thyroid gland related to iodine deficiency.

It is also sold as a nutritional supplement. Primary chemical constituents include mucilage, algin, mannitol, fucitol, beta-carotene, zeaxanthin, volatile oils, iodine, bromine, potassium and other minerals.

=== Adverse effects ===
Consumption of F. vesiculosus can cause platelet inhibition, which may potentiate the anticoagulant activity of warfarin (Coumadin). It should be avoided before surgery.

Some people may suffer an allergic reaction to the iodine in F. vesiculosus.

== See also ==
- Edible seaweed
- Iodine § Allergic reactions
