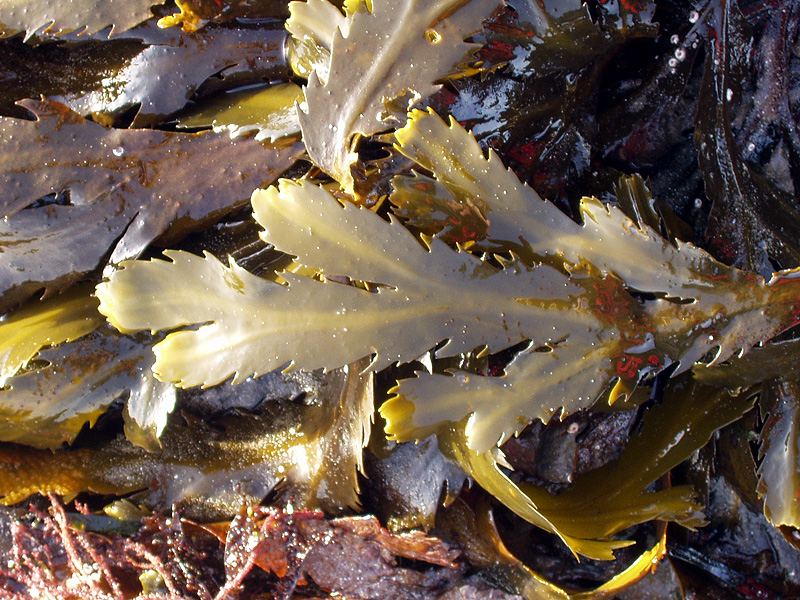
- Fucus serratus

Scientific classification
- Domain: Eukaryota
- Clade: Diaphoretickes
- Clade: SAR
- Clade: Stramenopiles
- Phylum: Gyrista
- Subphylum: Ochrophytina
- Class: Phaeophyceae
- Order: Fucales
- Family: Fucaceae; Adanson

= Fucaceae =

Family of seaweeds

The Fucaceae are a family of brown algae, containing six genera:

- Ascophyllum Stackhouse – one species
- Fucus L. – 15 species
- Hesperophycus Setchell & Gardner – one species
- Pelvetia Decne. & Thur. – one species
- Pelvetiopsis N.L.Gardner – two species
- Silvetia E.Serrão, T.O.Cho, S.M.Boo & S.H.Brawley – three species

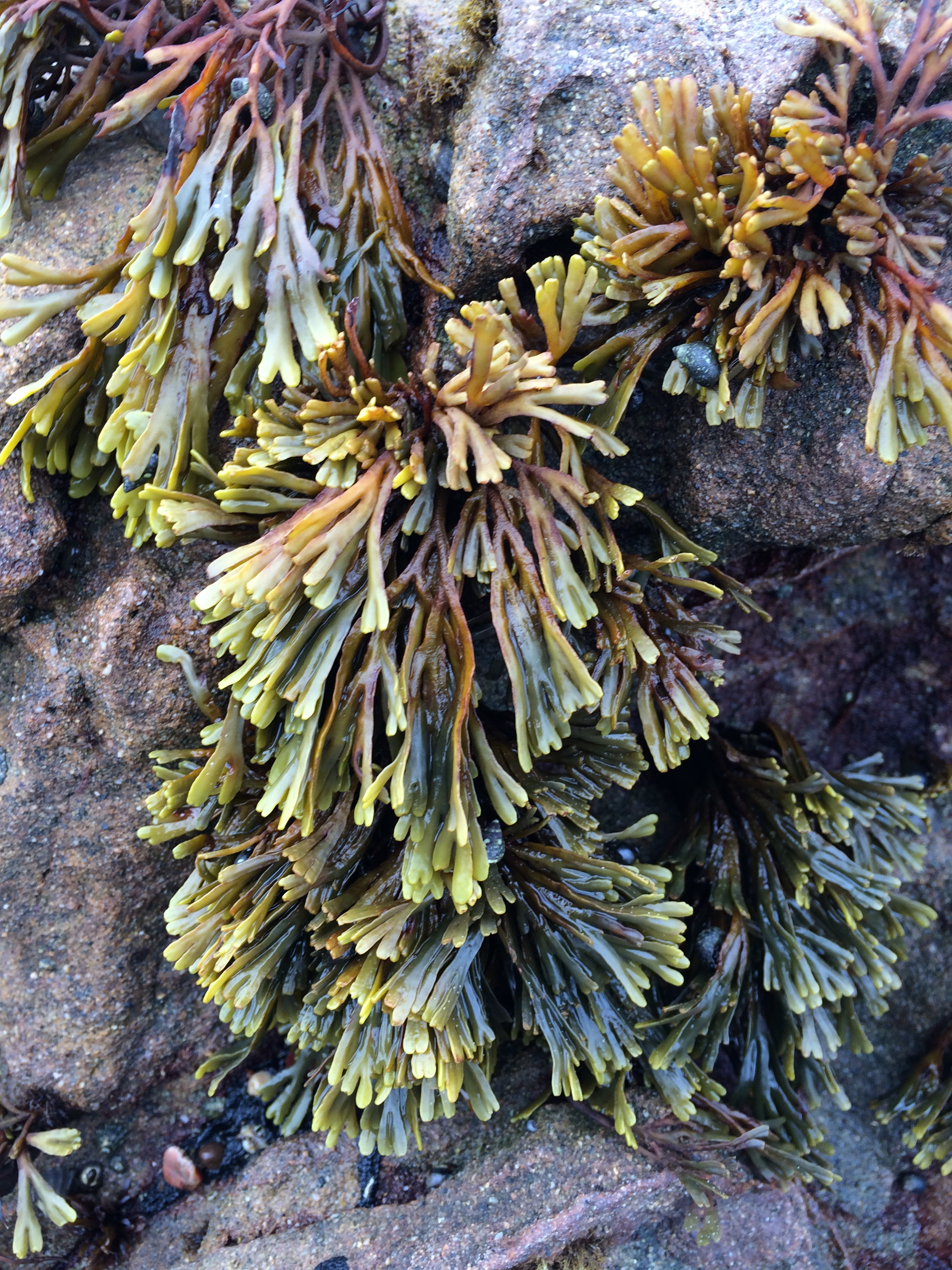
Dwarf rockweed, Pelvetiopsis limitata, north Moonstone near Cambria, CA
