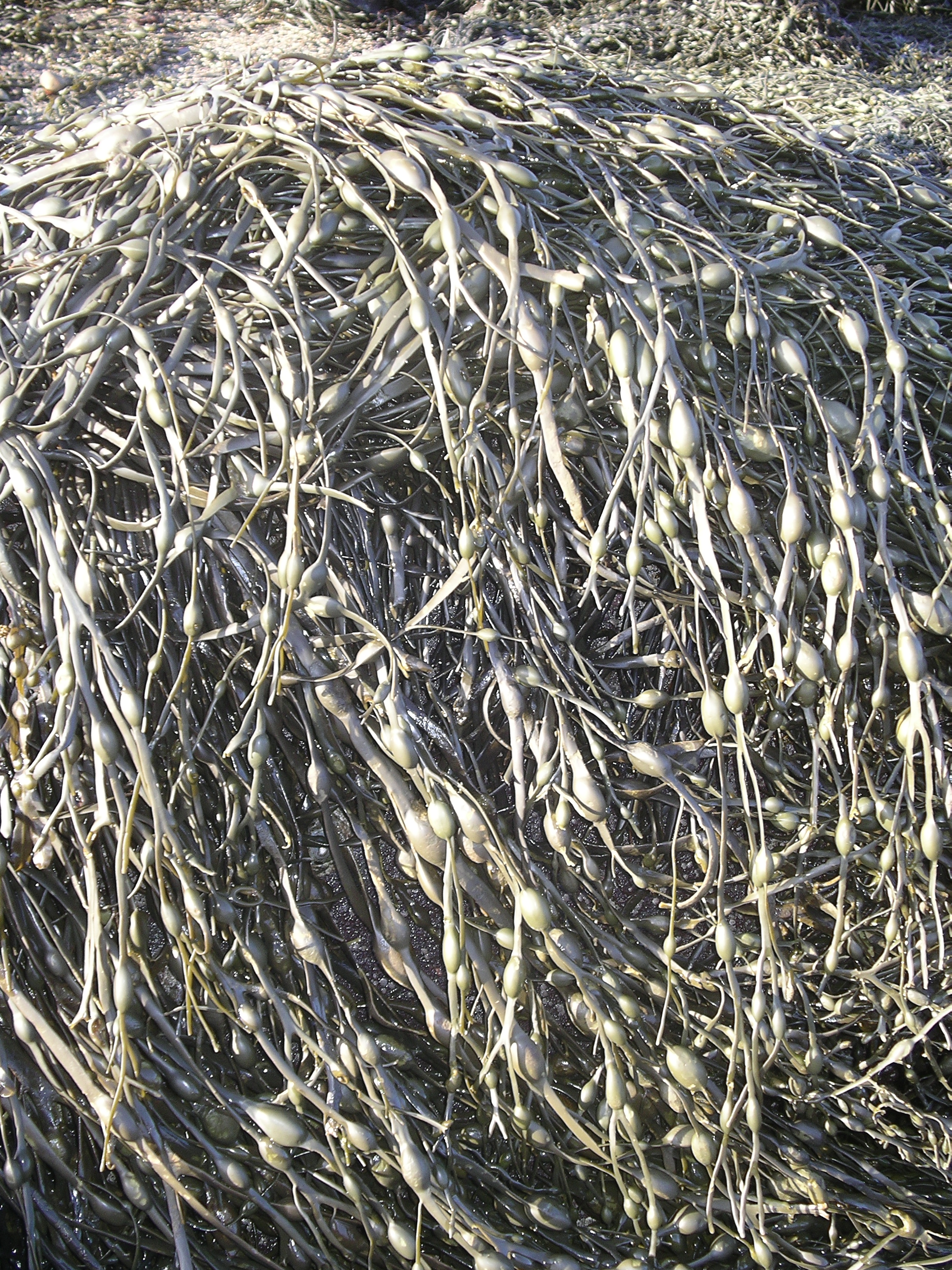
- Ascophyllum nodosum

Scientific classification
- Domain: Eukaryota
- Supergroup: Stramenopiles
- Division: Ochrophyta
- Class: Phaeophyceae
- Subclass: Fucophycidae
- Order: Fucales; Kylin

Families
- Bifurcariopsidaceae; Durvillaeaceae; Fucaceae; Himanthaliaceae; Hormosiraceae; Notheiaceae; Sargassaceae; Seirococcaceae; Xiphophoraceae

= Fucales =

Order of brown algae

The Fucales (fucoids) are an order in the brown algae (class Phaeophyceae). The list of families in the Fucales, as well as additional taxonomic information on algae, is publicly accessible at Algaebase.

The class Phaeophyceae is included within the division Heterokontophyta. This name comes from the Greek word phaios meaning "brown" and phyton meaning plant. They include some of the largest organisms in the sea, but some are small and fine in structure.

== Classification ==
The Fucales include some of the more common littoral seaweeds and the members of the order have the typical seaweed construction: a holdfast, stipe, and lamina. The lamina is often much branched and may include gas-filled bladders. Growth is by division of the apical cells.

They are oogamous – fusion between the small male gamete and the large female gamete.

== Habitat ==
Cystophora maschalocarpum, often found in the New Zealand habit. Home to P. affinis sprawn, one of the most abundant sprawn species in the New Zealand tide-pool habitat.
