= List of Sargassum species =

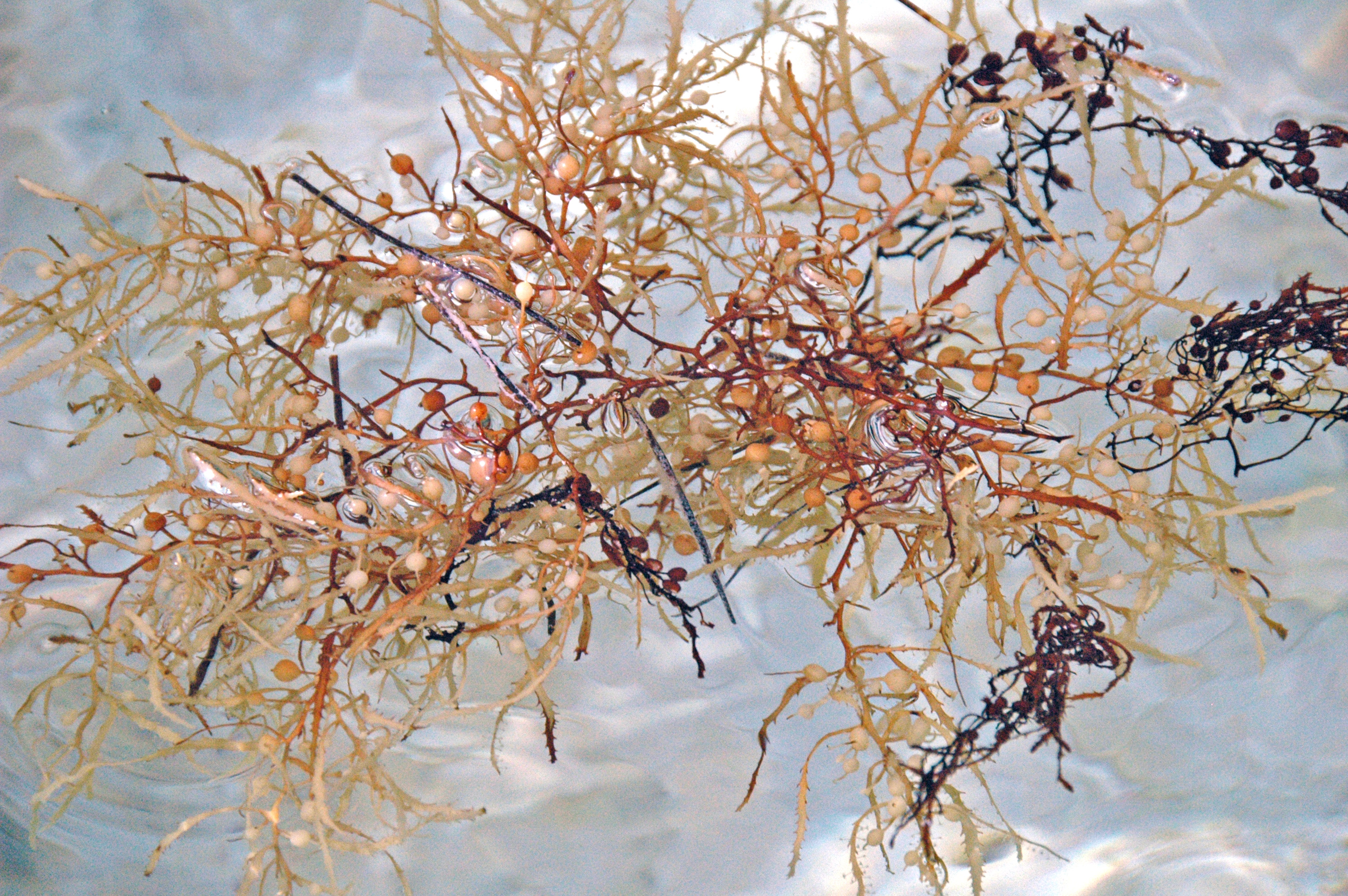
Sargassum natans, the type species of the genus Sargassum

The genus Sargassum contains over 300 species of brown algae:

== A ==
- Sargassum abbottiae G.C.Trono, Jr., 1994
- Sargassum acinacifolium Setchell & N.L.Gardner, 1924
- Sargassum acinaciforme Montagne, 1850
- Sargassum acinaria C.Agardh, 1821
- Sargassum acinarium (Linnaeus) Setchell, 1933
- Sargassum agardhianum Farlow, 1889
- Sargassum agaviforme Tseng & Lu, 1994
- Sargassum albemarlense W.R.Taylor, 1945
- Sargassum albertisii Piccone, 1884
- Sargassum alternato-pinnatum Yamada, 1942
- Sargassum amabile Yamada, 1942
- Sargassum amaliae Grunow, 1874
- Sargassum ammophilum Yoshida & T.Konno, 1982
- Sargassum angii L.M.Laio, 1998
- Sargassum angustifolioides Tseng & Lu, 2004
- Sargassum angustifolium C.Agardh, 1820
- Sargassum aquifolium (Turner) C.Agardh, 1820
- Sargassum araii Yoshida, 1994
- Sargassum armatum J.Agardh, 1848
- Sargassum arnaudianum Montagne, 1850
- Sargassum asperifolium Hering & G.Martens ex J.Agardh, 1848
- Sargassum assimile Harvey, 1860
- Sargassum autumnale Yoshida, 1983

== B ==
- Sargassum baccularia (Mertens) C.Agardh, 1824
- Sargassum balingasayense Trono, 1994
- Sargassum banyuejiaoense C.K.Tseng & Lu, 1996
- Sargassum bataanense G.C.Trono, 1994
- Sargassum beihaiense C.K.Tseng & B.Lu, 1999
- Sargassum belangeri Bory de Saint-Vincent, 1834
- Sargassum bermudense Grunow, 1916
- Sargassum bicorne J.Agardh, 1848
- Sargassum biserrulioides C.K.Tseng & Lu Baroen, 2002
- Sargassum boreale Yoshida & Horiguchi, 2000
- Sargassum botruosum Montagne, 1850
- Sargassum botuliforme Kraft, 2009
- Sargassum boveanum J.Agardh, 1848
- Sargassum brachycarpum J.Agardh, 1889
- Sargassum brachyphyllum Zanardini, 1874
- Sargassum brandegeei Setchell & N.L.Gardner, 1924
- Sargassum bulbiferum Yoshida, 1994
- Sargassum buxifolium (Chauvin) M.J.Wynne, 2011

== C ==
- Sargassum calophyllum De Notaris, 1858
- Sargassum capillare Kützing, 1843
- Sargassum capilliforme Tseng & Lu, 1994
- Sargassum capitatum Tseng & Lu, 2002
- Sargassum carpophyllum J.Agardh, 1848
- Sargassum cavernulosum Kraft, 2009
- Sargassum cervicorne Greville, 1849
- Sargassum chamissonis Kützing
- Sargassum cinctum J.Agardh, 1848
- Sargassum cinereum J.Agardh, 1848
- Sargassum cinotum J.Agardh
- Sargassum claviferum J.Agardh, 1889
- Sargassum clonocarpum Grunow, 1889
- Sargassum concinnum Greville ex J.Agardh, 1848
- Sargassum confusum C.Agardh, 1824
- Sargassum congkinhii Pham-Hoàng Hô, 1967
- Sargassum corderoi R.B.Modelo Jr, I.Umezaki & L.M.Liao, 1998
- Sargassum coreanum J.Agardh, 1889
- Sargassum cornigerum Sonder, 1915
- Sargassum cornutifructum H.D.Nguyen & Q.N.Huynh, 1999
- Sargassum costatum Tseng & Lu, 1996
- Sargassum cotoense Nguyen Huu Dai, 2002
- Sargassum crispifolium Yamada, 1931
- Sargassum cuneifolium J.Agardh, 1837
- Sargassum currimaoense G.C.Trono, 1994
- Sargassum cylindrocarpum Setchell & Gardner, 1924
- Sargassum cylindrocystum Figari & De Notaris, 1853
- Sargassum cymosum C.Agardh, 1820
- Sargassum cystocarpum C.Agardh, 1820
- Sargassum cystophyllum Montagne, 1842

== D ==
- Sargassum dasyphyllum
- Sargassum dazhouense Tseng & Lu, 1997
- Sargassum decaisnei J.Agardh, 1848
- Sargassum densicystum Tseng & Lu, 1996
- Sargassum densifolium Zanardini, 1858
- Sargassum denticarpum T.Ajisaka, 1994
- Sargassum dentifolium (Turner) C.Agardh, 1820
- Sargassum desfontainesii (Turner) C.Agardh, 1820
- Sargassum desvauxii (Mertens) C.Agardh, 1820
- Sargassum distichum Sonder, 1845
- Sargassum divaricatum Greville, 1849
- Sargassum diversifolium (Turner) C.Agardh, 1824
- Sargassum dotyi Trono, 1994
- Sargassum dumosum Greville, 1848

== E ==
- Sargassum ecuadoreanum W.R.Taylor, 1945
- Sargassum elegans Suhr, 1840
- Sargassum emarginatum C.K.Tseng & Lu, 1978
- Sargassum ensifolium (C.Agardh) J.Agardh, 1873
- Sargassum erinaceum Greville ex Kuntze, 1880
- Sargassum erosum J.Agardh, 1889
- Sargassum erumpens Tseng & Lu, 1996
- Sargassum esperi C.Agardh, 1820
- Sargassum expansum Kuntze, 1880

== F ==
- Sargassum fallax Sonder, 1845
- Sargassum feldmannii Pham-Hoàng Hô, 1967
- Sargassum fergusonii Grunow, 1915
- Sargassum filifolium (C.Agardh) C.Agardh, 1824
- Sargassum filiforme Montagne, 1844
- Sargassum filipendula C.Agardh, 1824
- Sargassum fissifolium (Mertens) C.Agardh, 1823
- Sargassum flavicans (Mertens) C.Agardh, 1820
- Sargassum flavifolium Kützing, 1849
- Sargassum fluitans (Børgesen) Børgesen, 1914
- Sargassum fragile J.Agardh, 1889
- Sargassum fresenianum J.Agardh, 1837
- Sargassum frutescens Tseng & Lu, 1994
- Sargassum fruticulosum Tseng & Lu, 1994
- Sargassum fujianense C.K.Tseng & B.Lu, 2002
- Sargassum fuliginosoides Tseng & Lu, 2000
- Sargassum fulvellum (Turner) C.Agardh, 1820
- Sargassum furcatum Kützing, 1843
- Sargassum fuscifolium Tseng & Lu, 2002
- Sargassum fusiforme (Harvey) Setchell, 1931

== G ==
- Sargassum galapagense Grunow, 1886
- Sargassum gemmiphorum Tseng & Lu, 2000
- Sargassum giganteifolium Yamada, 1925
- Sargassum giganteum O.Camacho & G.Diaz-Pulido, 2014
- Sargassum glandulifolium Grunow, 1900
- Sargassum glaucescens J.Agardh, 1848
- Sargassum globulariifolium J.Agardh, 1889
- Sargassum godeffroyi Grunow, 1874
- Sargassum gracillimum Reinbold, 1913
- Sargassum graminifolium C.Agardh, 1820
- Sargassum granuliferum C.Agardh, 1820
- Sargassum guangdongii Tseng & Lu, 1994

== H ==
- Sargassum hainanense Tseng & Lu, 1995
- Sargassum hemiphylloides Kützing, 1847
- Sargassum hemiphyllum (Turner) C.Agardh, 1820
- Sargassum henslowianum C.Agardh, 1848
- Sargassum herbaceum Kützing, 1849
- Sargassum herklotsii Setchell, 1933
- Sargassum herporhizum Setchell & N.L.Gardner, 1924
- Sargassum hildebrandtii Grunow, 1889
- Sargassum hombronianum Montagne, 1845
- Sargassum horneri (Turner) C.Agardh, 1820
- Sargassum hornschuchii C.Agardh, 1820
- Sargassum horridulum Grunow, 1874
- Sargassum horridum Setchell & N.L.Gardner, 1924
- Sargassum howellii Setchell, 1937
- Sargassum huangluense C.K.Tseng & Lu, 1996
- Sargassum hystrix J.Agardh, 1847
- Sargassum heterophyllum C.Agardh, 1820

== I ==
- Sargassum ilicifolioides Tseng & Lu, 2002
- Sargassum ilicifolium (Turner) C.Agardh, 1820
- Sargassum incanum Grunow, 1915
- Sargassum incisifolium (Turner) C.Agardh, 1820
- Sargassum integerrimum Tseng & Lu, 2002
- Sargassum integrifolioides Tseng & Lu, 2000
- Sargassum intermedium Tseng & Lu, 1996
- Sargassum involucratum De Notaris, 1842

== J ==
- Sargassum johnsonii V.J.Chapman, 1961
- Sargassum johnstonii Setchell & N.L.Gardner, 1924

== K ==
- Sargassum kashiwajimanum Yendo, 1907
- Sargassum kasyotense Yamada, 1944
- Sargassum kuetzingii Setchell, 1931
- Sargassum kushimotense Yendo, 1907

== L ==
- Sargassum lacerifolium (Turner) C.Agardh, 1820
- Sargassum laevigatum J.Agardh, 1889
- Sargassum lanceolatum J.Agardh, 1848
- Sargassum lapazeanum Setchell & N.L.Gardner, 1924
- Sargassum latifolium (Turner) C.Agardh, 1820
- Sargassum laxifolium Tseng & Lu, 1987
- Sargassum leizhouense Tseng & Lu, 1994
- Sargassum lendigerum (Linnaeus) C.Agardh, 1820
- Sargassum leptopodum J.Agardh, 1889
- Sargassum leptopodum Sonder, 1871
- Sargassum liebmannii J.Agardh, 1847
- Sargassum ligulatum C.Agardh, 1824
- Sargassum linearifolium (Turner) C.Agardh, 1820
- Sargassum longicarpum Tseng & Lu, 2004
- Sargassum longicaulis Tseng & Lu, 1994
- Sargassum longifolius
- Sargassum longifructum C.K.Tseng & B.Lu, 1987
- Sargassum longivesiculosum Tseng & Lu, 1998
- Sargassum lophocarpum J.Agardh, 1889

== M ==
- Sargassum macdougalii E.Y.Dawson, 1944
- Sargassum macrocarpum C.Agardh, 1820
- Sargassum macrophyllum Zanardini, 1874
- Sargassum marcaccii Grunow, 1884
- Sargassum marginatum (C.Agardh) J.Agardh, 1848
- Sargassum mathiesonii Kilar, 1992
- Sargassum mcclurei Setchell, 1933
- Sargassum megalocystum Tseng & Lu, 1997
- Sargassum micracanthum (Kützing) Endlicher, 1843
- Sargassum microceratium (Mertens ex Turner) C.Agardh, 1820
- Sargassum microcystum J.Agardh, 1848
- Sargassum microphyllum C.Agardh, 1820
- Sargassum minimum Tseng & Lu, 2004
- Sargassum miyabei Yendo, 1907
- Sargassum muticum (Yendo) Fensholt, 1955

== N ==
- Sargassum namoense Nguyen Huu Dai, 2004
- Sargassum nanshaense C.K.Tseng & Lu, 1996
- Sargassum naozhounse C.K.Tseng & Lu, 1987
- Sargassum natans (Linnaeus) Gaillon, 1828
- Sargassum neglectum Figari & De Notaris, 1853
- Sargassum neurophorum J.Agardh, 1889
- Sargassum nigrescens Zanardini, 1858
- Sargassum nigrifolioides C.K.Tseng & Lu, 1985
- Sargassum nigrifolium Yendo, 1907
- Sargassum nipponicum Yendo, 1907
- Sargassum notarisii Zanardini, 1858
- Sargassum novae-hollandiae P.C.Silva, 1996
- Sargassum nozhouense Tseng & Lu, 1987

== O ==
- Sargassum obtusifolium J.Agardh, 1848
- Sargassum ohnoi G.C.Trono, 1994
- Sargassum okamurae Yoshida & T.Konno, 1983
- Sargassum oligocystum Montagne, 1845
- Sargassum orotavicum T.Díaz-Villa, J.Afonso-Carillo & M.Sansón, 2004

== P ==
- Sargassum pachycarpum J.Agardh, 1889
- Sargassum pacificum Bory de Saint-Vincent, 1828
- Sargassum pallidum (Turner) C.Agardh, 1820
- Sargassum palmeri Grunow, 1915
- Sargassum paniculatum J.Agardh, 1848
- Sargassum paradoxum (R.Brown ex Turner) Gaillon, 1828
- Sargassum parvifolioides Tseng & Lu, 2002
- Sargassum parvifolium (Turner) C.Agardh, 1820
- Sargassum parvivesiculosum C.K.Tseng & Lu, 1979
- Sargassum parvulum Tseng & Lu, 2004
- Sargassum patens C.Agardh, 1820
- Sargassum persicum Kützing, 1849
- Sargassum pfeifferae Grunow, 1874
- Sargassum phamhoangii Nguyen Huu Dai, 2002
- Sargassum philippinense Grunow, 1916
- Sargassum phyllocystum C.K.Tseng & Lu, 1979
- Sargassum picconii Grunow, 1889
- Sargassum piluliferum (Turner) C.Agardh, 1820
- Sargassum pinnatifidum Harvey, 1860
- Sargassum pinnatiphyllum Kraft, 2009
- Sargassum plagiophyllum C.Agardh, 1824
- Sargassum platycarpum Montagne, 1842
- Sargassum podacanthoides Kraft, 2009
- Sargassum podacanthum Sonder, 1845
- Sargassum polyacanthum J.Agardh, 1889
- Sargassum polyceratium Montagne, 1837
- Sargassum polycystum C.Agardh, 1824
- Sargassum polyphyllum J.Agardh, 1848
- Sargassum polyporum Montagne, 1842
- Sargassum portierianum Zanardini, 1858
- Sargassum primitivum Tseng & Lu, 1995
- Sargassum prismaticum V.D.Chauhan, 1965
- Sargassum pseudocystocarpum Grunow, 1886
- Sargassum pseudolanceolatum Tseng & Lu, 2002
- Sargassum pterocystum Zanardini, 1858
- Sargassum pteropleuron Grunow, 1868
- Sargassum pulchellum Grunow, 1888
- Sargassum pumilum Tseng & Lu, 2000
- Sargassum pusillum W.R.Taylor, 1975
- Sargassum pyriforme C.Agardh, 1824

== Q ==
- Sargassum qingdaoense C.K.Tseng & B.Lu, 2000
- Sargassum qinzhounse C.K.Tseng & B.Lu, 1994
- Sargassum qionghaiense Tseng & Lu, 1996
- Sargassum quinhonense Nguyen Huu Dai, 2002

== R ==
- Sargassum ramentaceum Zarmouth & Nizamuddin, 1991
- Sargassum ramifolium Kützing, 1861
- Sargassum raoulii J.D.Hooker & Harvey, 1845
- Sargassum rhizophorum Tseng & Lu, 2002
- Sargassum ringgoldianum Harvey, 1860
- Sargassum robillardii (Grunow) Mattio, Zubia, Loveday, Crochelet, Duong, Payri, Bhagooli & Bolton, 2013
- Sargassum robustum Kuntze, 1880
- Sargassum rostratum J.Agardh, 1896
- Sargassum ryukyuense Shimabukuro & Yoshida, 2008

== S ==
- Sargassum sagamianum Yendo, 1907
- Sargassum salicifolioides Yamada, 1942
- Sargassum salicifolium (J.Agardh) J.Agardh, 1889
- Sargassum salicifolium Naccari, 1828
- Sargassum saltii (Turner) C.Agardh, 1824
- Sargassum samarense G.C.Trono, Jr, 1994
- Sargassum sanyaense Tseng & Lu, 1997
- Sargassum saundersii Kraft, 2009
- Sargassum scabridum J.D.Hooker & Harvey, 1845
- Sargassum scherzerianum Grunow, 1868
- Sargassum schnetteri (Bula-Meyer) Camacho, Mattio & Diaz-Pulido, 2014
- Sargassum scopula Grunow, 1916
- Sargassum segii Yoshida, 1976
- Sargassum serratifolium (C.Agardh) C.Agardh, 1820
- Sargassum serratum Nguyen Huu Dai, 2004
- Sargassum shandongense C.K.Tseng, Z.F.Zhang & B.Lu, 2000
- Sargassum shangchuanii Tseng & Lu, 1994
- Sargassum siliculosoides Tseng & Lu, 2002
- Sargassum siliquastrum (Mertens ex Turner) C.Agardh, 1820
- Sargassum siliquosum J.Agardh, 1848
- Sargassum silvae C.K.Tseng & Lu Baoren, 1999
- Sargassum silvai Tseng & Lu, 1999
- Sargassum sinclairii J.D.Hooker & Harvey, 1845
- Sargassum sinicola Setchell & N.L.Gardner, 1924
- Sargassum sonorense E.Y.Dawson, 1960
- Sargassum spathulophyllum J.Tanaka, H.Murakami & S.Arai, 1999
- Sargassum spinifex C.Agardh, 1820
- Sargassum spinuligerum Sonder, 1845
- Sargassum squarrosum Greville, 1849
- Sargassum steinitzii Lipkin & P.C.Silva, 2002
- Sargassum subdroserifolium Tseng & Lu, 2002
- Sargassum subfalcatum Sonder, 1854
- Sargassum subrepandum (Forsskål) C.Agardh, 1820
- Sargassum subspathulatum (Grunow) Grunow, 1916
- Sargassum subtilissimum C.K.Tseng & Lu, 1978
- Sargassum sullivanii G.C.Trono, 1994
- Sargassum swartzii C.Agardh, 1820
- Sargassum symphyorhizoideum Tseng & Lu, 2002

== T ==
- Sargassum taeniatum Kuntze, 1880
- Sargassum taiwanicum C.KTseng & B.Lu, 1999
- Sargassum telephifolium (Turner) C.Agardh, 1820
- Sargassum templetonii Setchell, 1937
- Sargassum tenerrimum J.Agardh, 1848
- Sargassum tenuifolioides Tseng & Lu, 2002
- Sargassum tenuifolium Yamada, 1942
- Sargassum tenuissimum (Endlicher & Diesling) Grunow, 1915
- Sargassum teretifolium J.Agardh, 1848
- Sargassum thivyae V.Krishnamurthy & R.Ezhili, 2000
- Sargassum thunbergii (Mertens ex Roth) Kuntze, 1880
- Sargassum tilesii Grunow, 1916
- Sargassum torvum J.Agardh, 1889
- Sargassum tosaense Yendo, 1907
- Sargassum trichocarpum J.Agardh, 1889
- Sargassum tristichum Sonder, 1845
- Sargassum turbinarioides Grunow, 1915

== U ==
- Sargassum ulixei G.Andrade-Sorcia & S.M.Boo, 2014
- Sargassum umezakii G.C.Trono, 1994

== V ==
- Sargassum vachellianum Greville, 1848
- Sargassum vaysierianum Montagne, 1850
- Sargassum velasquezii G.C.Trono, 1992
- Sargassum verrucosum Zanardini, 1858
- Sargassum vestitum (R.Brown ex Turner) C.Agardh, 1820
- Sargassum vigorosum P.C.Silva, 1996
- Sargassum virescens Figari & De Notaris, 1853
- Sargassum virgatum C.Agardh, 1820
- Sargassum vizcainense E.Y.Dawson, 1954
- Sargassum vulgare C.Agardh, 1820

== W ==
- Sargassum wakayamaense Yoshida, 1994
- Sargassum wangii C.K.Tseng & Lu Baoren, 1998
- Sargassum weizhounse C.K.Tseng & Lu, 2002
- Sargassum wenchangense Tseng & Lu, 1995
- Sargassum wsizhouense Tseng & Lu, 2002

== X ==
- Sargassum xishaense C.K.Tseng & Lu, 1979

== Y ==
- Sargassum yamadae Yoshida & T.Konno, 1983
- Sargassum yamamotoi Yoshida, 1983
- Sargassum yemenense
- Sargassum yendoi Okamura & Yamada, 1938
- Sargassum yezoense (Yamada) Yoshida & T.Konno, 1983
- Sargassum yinggehaiense Tseng & Lu, 2002
- Sargassum yongxingense Tseng & Lu, 1997
- Sargassum yoshidae G.C.Trono, 1994

== Z ==
- Sargassum zacae Setchell, 1937
- Sargassum zhangii C.K.Tseng & Lu Baoren, 1999

== See also ==
- List of brown algal genera
- Great Atlantic Sargassum Belt
