= List of species associated with pelagic Sargassum patches =

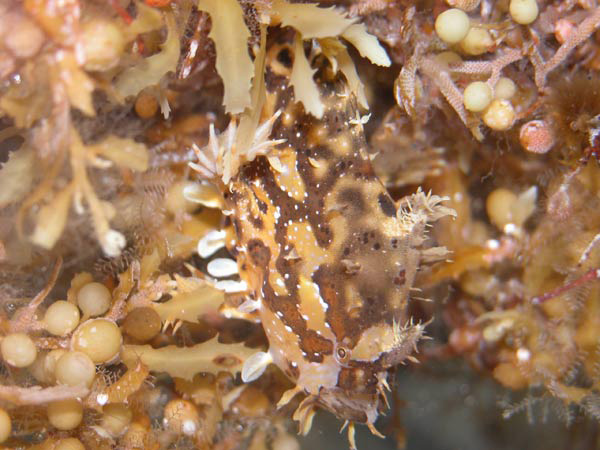
The Sargassum fish (Histrio histrio) in a clump of Sargassum

This is a list of species associated with pelagic Sargassum patches, floating sea mats made of the brown algae Sargassum natans and Sargassum fluitans. Sargassum patches are an important habitat for many marine species that use the algae for hunting, breeding, nursing, and overall living. Some species are endemic to the habitat.

== Annelida ==
Phyllodocida

- Platyneries dumerilli
- Platynereis mucronata

Sabellida

- Neodexiospira formosa
- Spiral tubeworm (Spirorbis spirorbis)

== Arthropoda ==
Amphipoda

- Ampithoe longimana
- Biancolina brassicacephala
- Deutella incerta
- Hemiaegina minuta
- Hyale spp.
- Nototropis minikoi
- Sunamphitoe pelagica

Decapoda

- Cerulean Sargassum Shrimp (Hippolyte coerulescens)
- Gulfweed Shrimp (Latreutes fucorum)
- Brown grass shrimp (Leander tenuicornis)
- Sargassum crab (Planes minutus)
- Sargassum swimming crab (Portunus sayi)

Isopoda

- Carpias minutus

Pantopoda

- Anoplodactylus petiolatus
- Endeis spinosa
- Tanystylum orbiculare

Thecostraca

- Small goose barnacle (Lepas pectinata)

== Bryozoans ==
Cheilostomatida

- Sargassum sea mat (Jellyella tuberculata)

== Chordata ==
Actinopterygii

- Sergeant major (Abudefduf saxatilis)
- Dotterel filefish (Aluterus heudeloti)
- European eel (Anguilla anguilla)
- Mahi-mahi (Coryphaena hippurus)
- Spot-fin porcupinefish (Diodon hystrix)
- Bermuda bream (Diplodus bermudensis)
- Sargassum fish (Histrio histrio)
- Atlantic tripletail (Lobotes surinamensis)
- Atlantic blue marlin (Makaira nigrican)
- Cobia (Rachycentron canadum)
- Greater amberjack (Seriola dumerili)
- Planehead filefish (Stephanolepis hispidus)
- Sargassum pipefish (Syngnathus pelagicus)
- White marlin (Tetrapterus albidus)
- Albacore (Thunnus alalunga)
- Blackfin tuna (Thunnus atlanticus)
- Yellowfin tuna (Thunnus albacores)
- Bigeye tuna (Thunnus obesus)
- Atlantic bluefin tuna (Thunnus thynnus)
- Keel-jawed needlefish (Tylosurus acus)
- Swordfish (Xiphias gladius)

Ascidiacea

- Diplosoma listerianum

Aves

- Cory’s shearwater (Calonectris borealis)
- European herring gull (Larus argentatus)
- Wilson’s storm-petrel (Oceanites oceanicus)
- Leach’s storm-petrel (Oceanodroma leucorhoa)
- Red phalarope (Phalaropus fulicaria)
- Red-necked phalarope (Phalaropus lobatus)
- Red-billed tropicbird (Phaethon aethereus)
- White-tailed tropicbird (Phaethon lepturus)
- Bermuda petrel (Pterodroma cahow)
- Black-capped petrel (Pterodroma hasitata)
- Greater shearwater (Puffinus gravis)
- Sooty shearwater (Puffinus griseus)
- Sargasso shearwater (Puffinus Iherminieri)
- Long-tailed jaeger (Stercorarius longicaudis)
- Parasitic jaeger (Stercorarius parasiticus)
- Pomarine jaeger (Stercorarius pomarinus)
- Bridled tern (Sterna anaethetus)
- Least tern (Sterna antillarum)
- Sooty tern (Sterna fuscata)
- Arctic tern (Sterna paradisaea)
- Common tern (Sterna hirundo)
- Royal tern (Sterna maxima)
- Masked booby (Sula dactylatra)
- Brown booby (Sula leucogaster)

Chondrichthyes

- Great white shark (Carcharodon carcharius)
- Silky shark (Carcharhinus falciformi)
- Galapagos shark (Carcharinus galapagensi)
- Oceanic whitetip shark (Carcharhinus longimanus)
- Basking shark (Cetorhinus maximus)
- Tiger shark (Galeocerdo cuvier)
- Shortfin mako shark (Isurus oxyrinchu)
- Porbeagle (Lamna nasu)
- Blue shark (Prionace glauca)
- Whale shark (Rhincodon typus)
- Scalloped hammerhead (Sphyrna lewini)

Reptilia

- Loggerhead sea turtle (Caretta caretta)
- Green sea turtle (Chelonia mydas)
- Leatherback sea turtle (Dermochelys coriacea)
- Hawksbill sea turtle (Eretmochelys imbricata)
- Kemp’s ridley sea turtle (Lepidochelys kempi)

== Cnidaria ==
Hexacorallia

- Sargassum anemone (Anemonia sargassensis)

Hydrozoa

- Feather plume hydroid (Aglaophenia latecarinata)
- Clytia noliformis
- Dynamena disticha
- Monotheca margaretta
- Obelia dichotoma
- Plumularia strictocarpa
- Sarsia tubulosa
- Tridentata marginata
- Zanclea costata

== Cyanobacteriota ==
Nostocales

- Calothrix crustacea
- Calothrix parietina
- Dichothrix bornetiana

Oscillatoriales

- Lyngbya majuscula

== Mollusca ==
Caenogastropoda

- Brown Sargassum shell (Litiopa melanostoma)

Nudibranchia

- Corambe obscura
- Doto pygmaea
- Sargassum nudibranch (Scyllaea pelagica)

== Platyhelminthes ==
Polycladida

- Chatziplana grubei
- Gnesioceros sargassicola
