= Anemonia sargassensis =

Sargassum anemone
- Sargassum anemone off of Serra do Mar State Park in Brazil

Scientific classification
- Kingdom: Animalia
- Phylum: Cnidaria
- Subphylum: Anthozoa
- Class: Hexacorallia
- Order: Actiniaria
- Family: Actiniidae
- Genus: Anemonia
- Species: A. sargassensis

Binomial name
- Anemonia sargassensis Hargitt, 1908

Species of sea anemone

Anemonia sargassensis, common name the sargassum anemone, is a species of sea anemone in the family Actiniidae. The sea anemone is often associated with the brown algae in the genus Sargassum, particularly S. fluitans and S. natans.

== Description ==
The sargassum anemone is a moderately sized anemone with a smooth oral disc that can have a diameter up to 2.2 cm wide and with the tentacles the diameter can be up to 5.0 cm wide. The oral disc is wider than the column underneath it and can be orange, brown, green, red, or white. The anemone has between 48 and 76 tentacles hexamerously arranged in 4 to 5 cycles around the mouth. These tentacles can be up to 1.9 cm long and smooth and slender while tapering at the end. The tentacles can be red or orange with some white. The fossa at the top of the column is well defined. The column in relatively short, reaching up to 1.2 cm long, and 1.1 cm wide.

== Distribution and habitat ==
The geographic range of the sargassum anemone stretches along the western coast of the Atlantic Ocean from northern United States to Brazil, including throughout the Gulf of Mexico. As the anemone is often associated with pelagic sargassum, it can also be found across the Atlantic where pelagic sargassum is found.

While the sargassum anemone is named after its common association with Sargassum, it can also be found in shallow, benthic habitats. When in these environments, the anemone can be found amongst rocks, corals, or sea grass beds such as those of turtle grass. The sargassum anemone lives at depths that are subtidal to 2 m deep.
