= Sargassum filipendula =

- Sargassum filipendula on a beach in Nantucket, MA

Scientific classification
- Domain: Eukaryota
- Supergroup: Stramenopiles
- Division: Ochrophyta
- Class: Phaeophyceae
- Order: Fucales
- Family: Sargassaceae
- Genus: Sargassum
- Species: S. filipendula

Binomial name
- Sargassum filipendula C.Agardh, 1824

Species of brown algae

Sargassum filipendula is a species of brown algae in the family Sargassaceae. The species name comes from the Latin word filum meaning 'thread', and pendere meaning 'to hang'. While S. filipendula sometimes called Gulfweed or Sargassum weed, these common names are often used for other species of Sargassum as well.

== Description ==
S. filipendula is a macroalgae that resembles many terrestrial plants with a branching structure. The algae has a central, round stipe that can grow up to about 2 feet (0.6 m) from its circular holdfast. Branch-like section come off the central axis that may have laminae and/or pneumatocysts. The laminae are relatively long and narrow for a species of Sargassum. These laminae are lance-shaped with serrated edges and a distinct midline. Along the laminae are tufts of hair-like structures. The pneumatocysts are filled with gases that keep the algae buoyant, causing it to stand upright while submerged. Reproductive structures may also be present and appear as small, forked segments.

Other species of Sargassum, including S. fluitans and S. natans, may be confused for S. filipendula or vice versa. However, while the species share many similarities, S. filipendula is not pelagic, so it has a holdfast, and the species has reproductive structures.

== Biology ==
The optimal water temperature for S. filipendula is between 18 °C and 30 °C while its optimal salinity range is between 24 and 42 ppt. However, the species is relativity tolerant, especially for within its genus. It can survive a much larger range of temperatures and salinity.

== Distribution and habitat ==
S. filipendula can be found across the western Atlantic Ocean from Massachusetts in the United States to Brazil, including throughout the Gulf of Mexico. The algae can also be found in southern Asia. Within this geographic range, the algae can be found attached to hard surfaces, including shells or rocks, from subtidal depths to 95 feet (29 m).

== Relation to humans ==
Many studies have extracted compounds from S. filipendula for pharmacological purposes. Some purposes of these compounds include antioxidants and antimicrobials. S. filipendula has also been found to have a high nutritional content, creating the possibility for future food use. These uses have led to research into the possible aquaculture of S. filipendula.

Within the aquarium trade, S. filipendula is sometimes used within saltwater tanks. The algae is useful in these tanks as it can help to absorb excess dissolved inorganic nitrogen and phosphorus from the water. The Sargassum also provides a complex structure for a variety of marine organisms to hide in.
