= Latreutes fucorum =

Scientific classification
- Kingdom: Animalia
- Phylum: Arthropoda
- Clade: Pancrustacea
- Class: Malacostraca
- Order: Decapoda
- Suborder: Pleocyemata
- Infraorder: Caridea
- Family: Hippolytidae
- Genus: Latreutes
- Species: L. fucorum

Binomial name
- Latreutes fucorum (Fabricius, 1798)

Species of marine shrimp

Latreutes fucorum, commonly called the gulfweed shrimp or the slender Sargassum shrimp, is a species of Caridean shrimp in the hump-backed shrimp family, Hippolytidae. The shrimp is often found living among brown algae in the genus Sargassum.

== Description ==
The gulfweed shrimp is a moderately sized shrimp that can grow up to 19 mm (0.75 in) long. The rostrum is blade-like with a blunt end and lacks teeth beside two spines at the tip. The shrimp's color is variable to match Sargassum, being mostly green, yellow, or brown, with white, blue, and black spots. The shrimp can change its color depending on the algae that it is associated with.

== Distribution ==
The gulfweed shrimp is found across the Atlantic Ocean, but is found more often in warmer waters.

== Ecology ==
As its common names suggest, the gulfweed shrimp is an associated species of Sargassum algae, particularly the pelagic species S. natans and S. fluitans. Within these species, the gulfweed shrimp is one of the most abundant macroinvertebrates. The shrimp is able to locate host algae through both visual and chemical cues. Smaller, younger individuals tend to cling parallel to the frond more often, as they are a size that allows for mimicry with the algae. Larger, older individuals tend to cling less and rely on camouflage across the algae for protection. These anti-predation measures help against some of the shrimp's predators, including the sargassum fish, filefish, and pipefish.
