= Hippolyte coerulescens =

Scientific classification
- Kingdom: Animalia
- Phylum: Arthropoda
- Clade: Pancrustacea
- Class: Malacostraca
- Order: Decapoda
- Suborder: Pleocyemata
- Infraorder: Caridea
- Family: Hippolytidae
- Genus: Hippolyte
- Species: H. coerulescens

Binomial name
- Hippolyte coerulescens (Fabricius, 1775)

Species of shrimp

Hippolyte coerulescens, the cerulean sargassum shrimp, is a species of shrimp in the family Hippolytidae. The shrimp is often associated with floating mats of the brown algae genus Sargassum.

== Description ==
The cerulean sargassum shrimp is a relatively small shrimp with a robust body. The shrimp can reach up to 16.5 mm long. The rostrum is medium-sized, being about as long as the carapace or shorter. The antennular peduncle is distinctively overreaching. The shrimp typically has only one dorsal and ventral teeth but may may between zero to three. There are two color morphs possible with the shrimp. The first is a dark blue with a white spot on its back. The second color morph is a yellowish brown with brown stripes and possibly orange spots. The rostrum, antennae, last three abdominal segments, uropods and telson are all typically transparent.

== Distribution and habitat ==
The geographic range of the cerulean sargassum shrimp spans across much of the Atlantic Ocean. Along the western side of the ocean, the range extends from Newfoundland to throughout the Caribbean Sea and the Gulf of Mexico. Along the ocean's western coast, the shrimp has been found from the Azores to southern Angola.

Within this range the cerulean sargassum shrimp is often found living amongst pelagic mats of Sargassum natans and Sargassum fluitans. This means the shrimp lives relatively close to the surface of the water.

== Biology ==
One of the cerulean sargassum shrimp's most distinct adaptations is the camouflage that it uses to hide within patches of Sargassum. The coloration often matches that of the algae and with adults, the stripes can help breakup the shrimp's shape. The transparent appendages and general shape of the shrimp also help give it a bulbous appearance that matches the gas-filled floats of the Sargassum.
