= Sargassum serratifolium =

Scientific classification
- Domain: Eukaryota
- Clade: Sar
- Clade: Stramenopiles
- Division: Ochrophyta
- Class: Phaeophyceae
- Order: Fucales
- Family: Sargassaceae
- Genus: Sargassum
- Species: S. serratifolium

Binomial name
- Sargassum serratifolium (C.Agardh) C.Agardh, 1820

Synonyms
- Fucus serratifolius C.Agardh, 1815

Species of seaweed

Sargassum serratifolium is a brown alga species in the genus Sargassum. It has been consumed as food and used in Asian traditional medicines and contains much of the compound Sargahydroquinoic acid.

== See also ==
- List of Sargassum species
