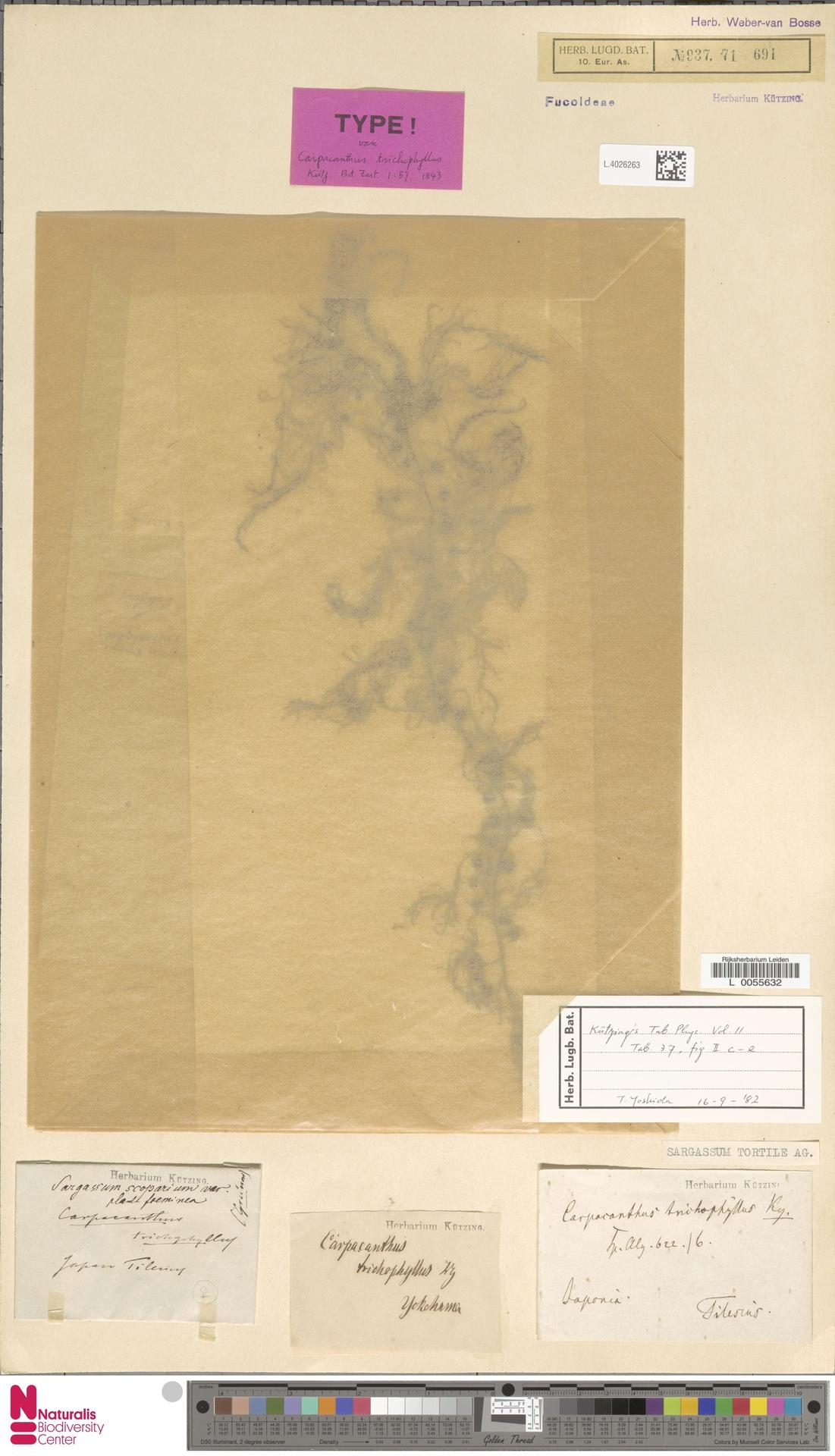

Scientific classification
- Domain: Eukaryota
- Clade: Diaphoretickes
- Clade: Sar
- Clade: Stramenopiles
- Phylum: Ochrophyta
- Class: Phaeophyceae
- Order: Fucales
- Family: Sargassaceae
- Genus: Sargassum
- Species: S. siliquastrum

Binomial name
- Sargassum siliquastrum (Mertens ex Turner) C.Agardh, 1820

Subspecies
- Sargassum siliquastrum var. nipponense Grunow; Sargassum siliquastrum var. capitellatum Grunow; Sargassum siliquastrum var. pyriferum Harvey

Synonyms
- Sargassum tortile (C.Agardh) C.Agardh, 1820

= Sargassum siliquastrum =

Species of seaweed

Sargassum siliquastrum is a brown alga species in the genus Sargassum.

Sargachromanols are bio-active isolates of S. siliquastrum. It has anti-inflammatory effect.

== See also ==
- List of Sargassum species
