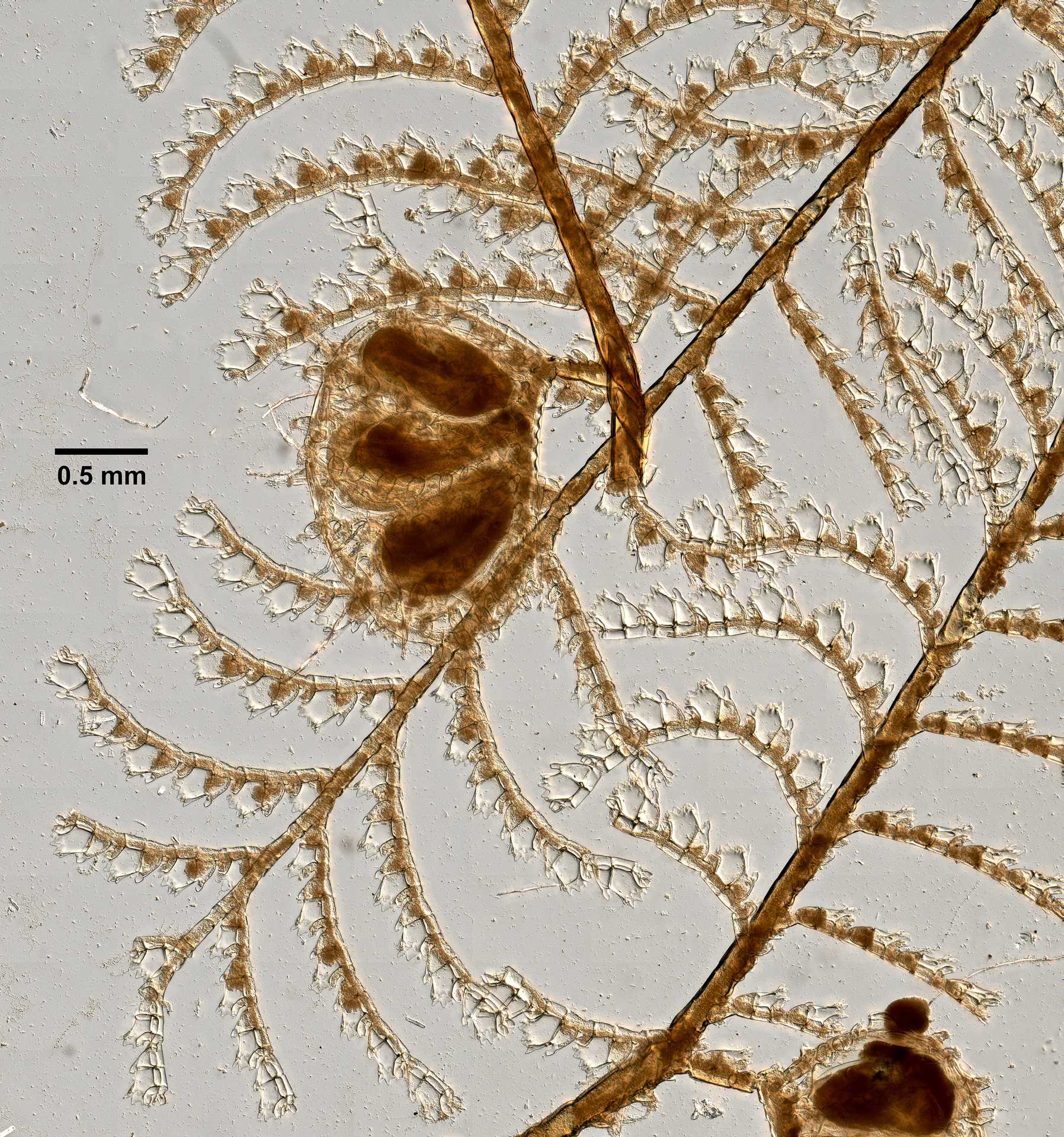

Scientific classification
- Kingdom: Animalia
- Phylum: Cnidaria
- Class: Hydrozoa
- Order: Leptothecata
- Family: Aglaopheniidae
- Genus: Aglaophenia
- Species: A. latecarinata

Binomial name
- Aglaophenia latecarinata George Allman, 1877

= Aglaophenia latecarinata =

Species of cnidarian

Aglaophenia latecarinata, the feather plume hydroid, is a colonial hydrozoan species in the family Aglaopheniidae. This species was first described by Irish zoologist George Allman in 1877.

== Description ==
Aglaophenia latecarinata forms delicate, branching colonies that are characteristic of the genus Aglaophenia. The colonies attach primarily to floating macroalgae and are epiphytic in nature.

== Distribution and habitat ==
A. latecarinata naturally occurs in the tropical and subtropical western Atlantic, including the Gulf of Mexico, the Caribbean Sea and the Sargasso Sea. The species has also been found in Korean waters, indicating that the species is present in parts of the western Pacific Ocean as well. It is most commonly found on pelagic mats of Sargassum, particularly the morphotypes S. natans I and VIII, and S. fluitans III, and has been observed at depths from the surface down to 516 meters.

== Behavior and ecology ==
Aglaophenia latecarinata reproduces exclusively in its hydroid stage. A 2019 study found that the distribution and mitochondrial genotype of A. latecarinata are correlated with the type of Sargassum substrate it colonizes, indicating a potential connection between genetic variation and habitat preference.
