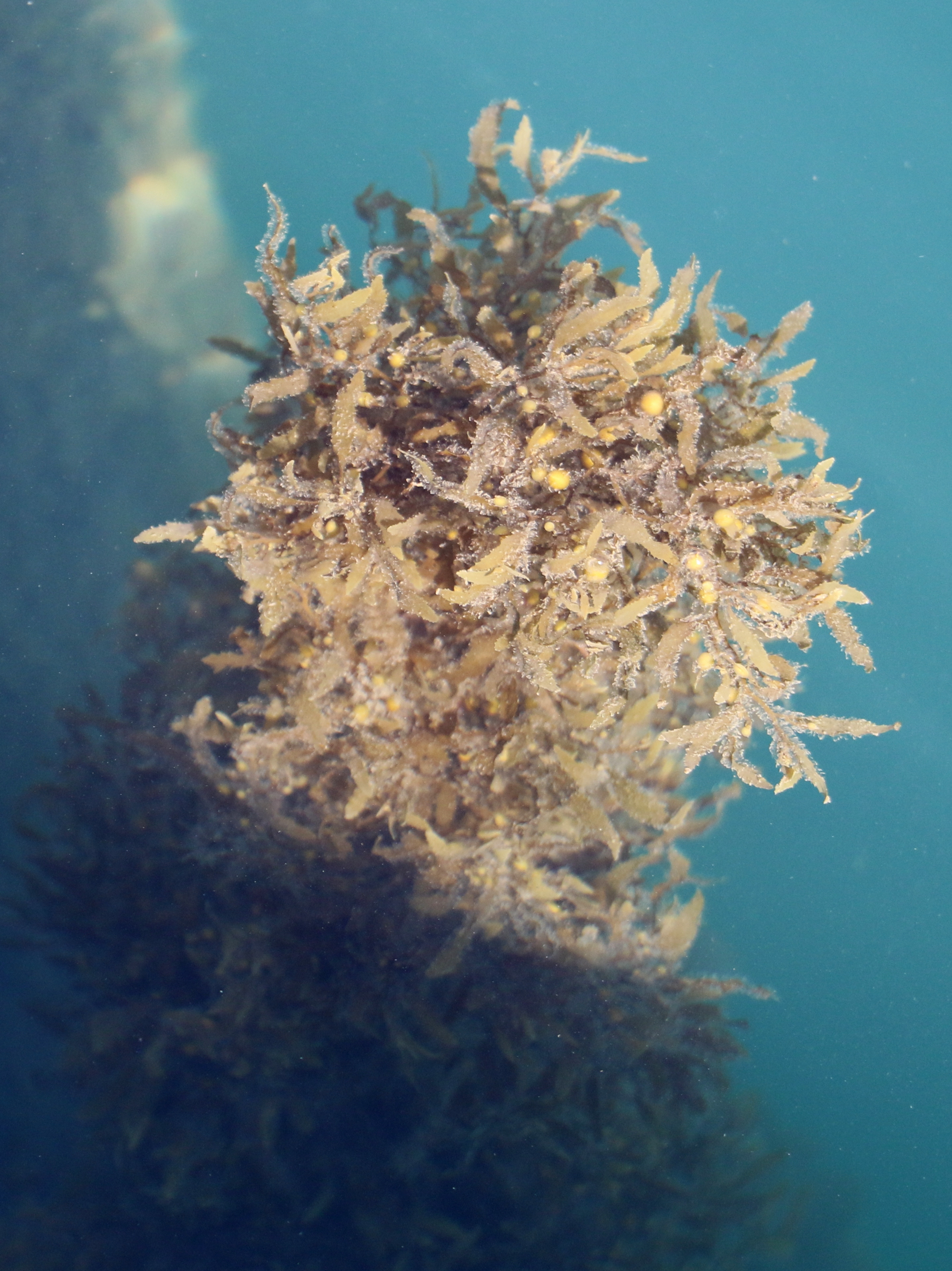

Scientific classification
- Domain: Eukaryota
- Clade: Diaphoretickes
- Clade: SAR
- Clade: Stramenopiles
- Phylum: Gyrista
- Subphylum: Ochrophytina
- Class: Phaeophyceae
- Order: Fucales
- Family: Sargassaceae
- Genus: Sargassum
- Species: S. linearifolium

Binomial name
- Sargassum linearifolium (Turner) C.Agardh

Synonyms
- Fucus linearifolius - Turner; Sargassum merrifieldii - C.Agardh

= Sargassum linearifolium =

Species of seaweed

Sargassum linearifolium is a species of brown macroalgae that is common along the coast of southern Australia, though probably excluding Tasmania. The most widely distributed southern Australian species of Sargassum. Often common in rock pools or the uppermost sublittoral areas on coasts where there is strong to moderate water movement. The original specimen's locality is likely to be King George Sound in Western Australia. This seaweed first appeared in scientific literature as Fucus linearifolius in the year 1808. Published by the English botanist Dawson Turner.
