= Sargassum ringgoldianum =

Scientific classification
- Domain: Eukaryota
- Clade: Diaphoretickes
- Clade: SAR
- Clade: Stramenopiles
- Phylum: Gyrista
- Subphylum: Ochrophytina
- Class: Phaeophyceae
- Order: Fucales
- Family: Sargassaceae
- Genus: Sargassum
- Species: S. ringgoldianum

Binomial name
- Sargassum ringgoldianum Harvey 1860

Subspecies
- Sargassum ringgoldianum subsp. coreanum (J.Agardh) Yoshida; Sargassum ringoldianum var. costatum Grunow; Sargassum ringoldianum f. ellipticum Okamura

Species of seaweed

Sargassum ringgoldianum is a brown alga species in the genus of Sargassum. The ethanol extract of S. ringgoldianum contains phlorotannins of the bifuhalol type, which shows an antioxidative activity.
