= Bifuhalol =

Names
- Preferred IUPAC name 5-(2,4,6-Trihydroxyphenoxy)benzene-1,2,3-triol
- Other names 5-(2,4,6-Trihydroxyphenoxy)-1,2,3-benzenetriol

Identifiers
CAS Number	53254-99-2
3D model (JSmol)	Interactive image
ChemSpider	278565
PubChem CID	314874
UNII	2CYH3FN39A
CompTox Dashboard (EPA)	DTXSID60310995
- InChI: InChI=1S/C12H10O7/c13-5-1-9(16)12(10(17)2-5)19-6-3-7(14)11(18)8(15)4-6/h1-4,13-18H Key: PYUFXOMNRPZYTI-UHFFFAOYSA-N
- SMILES: C1=C(C=C(C(=C1O)OC2=CC(=C(C(=C2)O)O)O)O)O

Properties
Chemical formula	C_{12}H_{10}O_{7}
Molar mass	266.205 g·mol^{−1}
- Except where otherwise noted, data are given for materials in their standard state (at 25 °C [77 °F], 100 kPa). Infobox references

Bifuhalol is a phlorotannin. The ethanol extract of the brown alga Sargassum ringgoldianum contains phlorotannins of the bifuhalol type, which shows an antioxidative activity.
