= Sargassum pallidum =

Scientific classification
- Domain: Eukaryota
- Clade: Diaphoretickes
- Clade: SAR
- Clade: Stramenopiles
- Phylum: Gyrista
- Subphylum: Ochrophytina
- Class: Phaeophyceae
- Order: Fucales
- Family: Sargassaceae
- Genus: Sargassum
- Species: S. pallidum

Binomial name
- Sargassum pallidum (Turner) C.Agardh, 1820

Synonyms
- Fucus pallidus Turner, 1808; Halochloa pallida (Turner) Kützing, 1849

Species of seaweed

Sargassum pallidum is a species of seaweed native to East Asia and Southeast Asia. It belongs to the subgenus Bactrophycus, section Teretia of the genus Sargassum. Along with Sargassum fusiforme, S. pallidum is often dried and processed into a traditional Chinese medicine known as Hai Zao or Herba Sargassi.
