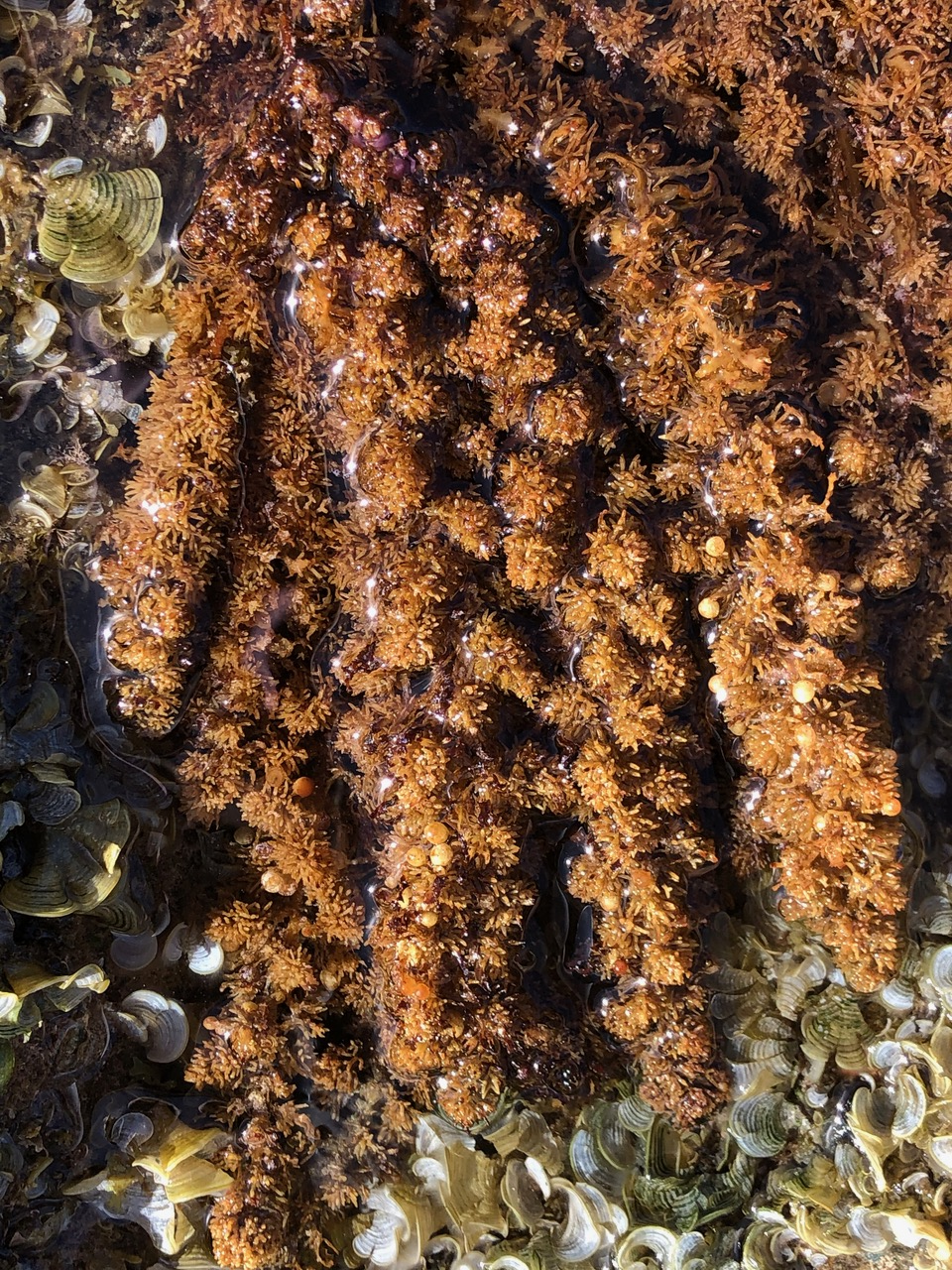

Scientific classification
- Domain: Eukaryota
- Clade: Sar
- Clade: Stramenopiles
- Phylum: Ochrophyta
- Class: Phaeophyceae
- Order: Fucales
- Family: Sargassaceae
- Genus: Sargassum
- Species: S. polyphyllum

Binomial name
- Sargassum polyphyllum J.Agardh

= Sargassum polyphyllum =

Species of algae

Sargassum polyphyllum is a species of brown (class Phaeophyceae) macroalgae or limu (seaweed) in the order Fucales.

== Description ==
Sargassum polyphyllum, or limu kala, consists of thin, rough, wavy blades and a firm thallus. Its height can range anywhere from 4 to 70 centimeters. Sargassum polyphyllum is versatile and resilient enough to survive in areas such as harsh intertidal zones.

== Distribution and habitat ==
Species of Sargassaceae can be found worldwide. However, Sargassum polyphyllum is endemic to the Hawaiian Archipelago. They can be found in intertidal pools and in depths of 75 meters below.

== Human use and cultural significance ==
In Hawaiian culture, limu kala is involved in certain religious practices such as asking for forgiveness and certain hula. It is also used in food, as fish bait, and traditional medicine.
