= Sargachromanol =

Sargachromanols
- Sargachromanol A

- Sargachromanol B

- Sargachromanol G

Identifiers
CAS Number	A: 856414-50-1; B: 856414-51-2; G: 856414-56-7
3D model (JSmol)	A: Interactive image; B: Interactive image; G: Interactive image
ChEMBL	G: ChEMBL462917
ChemSpider	A: 9511768; B: 9591548; G: 9582569
PubChem CID	A: 11336823; B: 11416661; G: 11407674
UNII	A: 3OG14YJA8B
- InChI: A: InChI=1S/C22H30O3/c1-16(7-5-8-17(2)15-23)9-6-11-22(4)12-10-19-14-20(24)13-18(3)21(19)25-22/h8-9,13-15,24H,5-7,10-12H2,1-4H3/b16-9+,17-8+/t22-/m1/s1 Key: ZOWAKKPZMKIVST-PSMGVCQDSA-N; B: InChI=1S/C22H32O3/c1-16(7-5-8-17(2)15-23)9-6-11-22(4)12-10-19-14-20(24)13-18(3)21(19)25-22/h8-9,13-14,23-24H,5-7,10-12,15H2,1-4H3/b16-9+,17-8+/t22-/m1/s1 Key: ZQCPSDWUSDOQTE-PSMGVCQDSA-N; G: InChI=1S/C27H38O4/c1-18(2)15-24(29)25(30)20(4)11-7-9-19(3)10-8-13-27(6)14-12-22-17-23(28)16-21(5)26(22)31-27/h10-11,15-17,24,28-29H,7-9,12-14H2,1-6H3/b19-10+,20-11+/t24-,27-/m1/s1 Key: CBIUHPWNXBUXBG-AZIDNILZSA-N
- SMILES: A: CC1=C2C(=CC(=C1)O)CCC(O2)(C)CCC=C(C)CCC=C(C)C=O; B: CC1=C2C(=CC(=C1)O)CCC(O2)(C)CCC=C(C)CCC=C(C)CO; G: CC1=C2C(=CC(=C1)O)CCC(O2)(C)CCC=C(C)CCC=C(C)C(=O)C(C=C(C)C)O

Properties
Chemical formula	A: C_{22}H_{30}O_{3} B: C_{22}H_{32}O_{3} G: C_{27}H_{38}O_{4}
Molar mass	A: 342.48 g/mol B: 344.49 g/mol G: 426.60 g/mol
- Except where otherwise noted, data are given for materials in their standard state (at 25 °C [77 °F], 100 kPa). Infobox references

Sargachromanols are a group of related chemical compounds isolated from the brown alga Sargassum siliquastrum. At least 20 members of the class have been identified, named sargachromanol A through T. Sargachromanol G has in vitro anti-inflammatory effects in isolated mouse macrophage cells.
