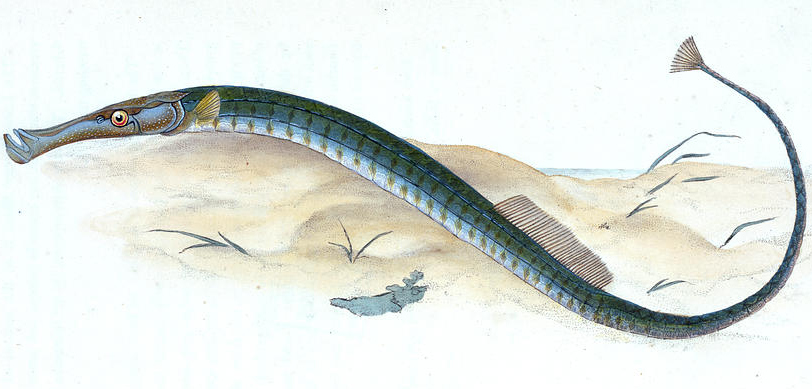

Conservation status
- Least Concern (IUCN 3.1)

Scientific classification
- Kingdom: Animalia
- Phylum: Chordata
- Class: Actinopterygii
- Order: Syngnathiformes
- Family: Syngnathidae
- Genus: Syngnathus
- Species: S. pelagicus

Binomial name
- Syngnathus pelagicus Linnaeus, 1758

Synonyms
- Syngnathus rousseau Kaup, 1856

= Sargassum pipefish =

Species of fish

The sargassum pipefish (Syngnathus pelagicus) is a species of pipefish found in the western Atlantic: Maine (United States), Bermuda, Northern Gulf of Mexico to Argentina, Nova Scotia, Antilles, and western Caribbean Sea from Yucatan to Colombia. It is a marine subtropical species, up to 18.1 centimetres (7.1 in) maximal length. This is a little-studied species which is found in floating rafts of Sargassum weed where they are believed to feed on planktonic crustacea. Like other pipefish, this is an ovoviviparous species in which the male carries the fertilised eggs in a brood pouch located under his tail.
