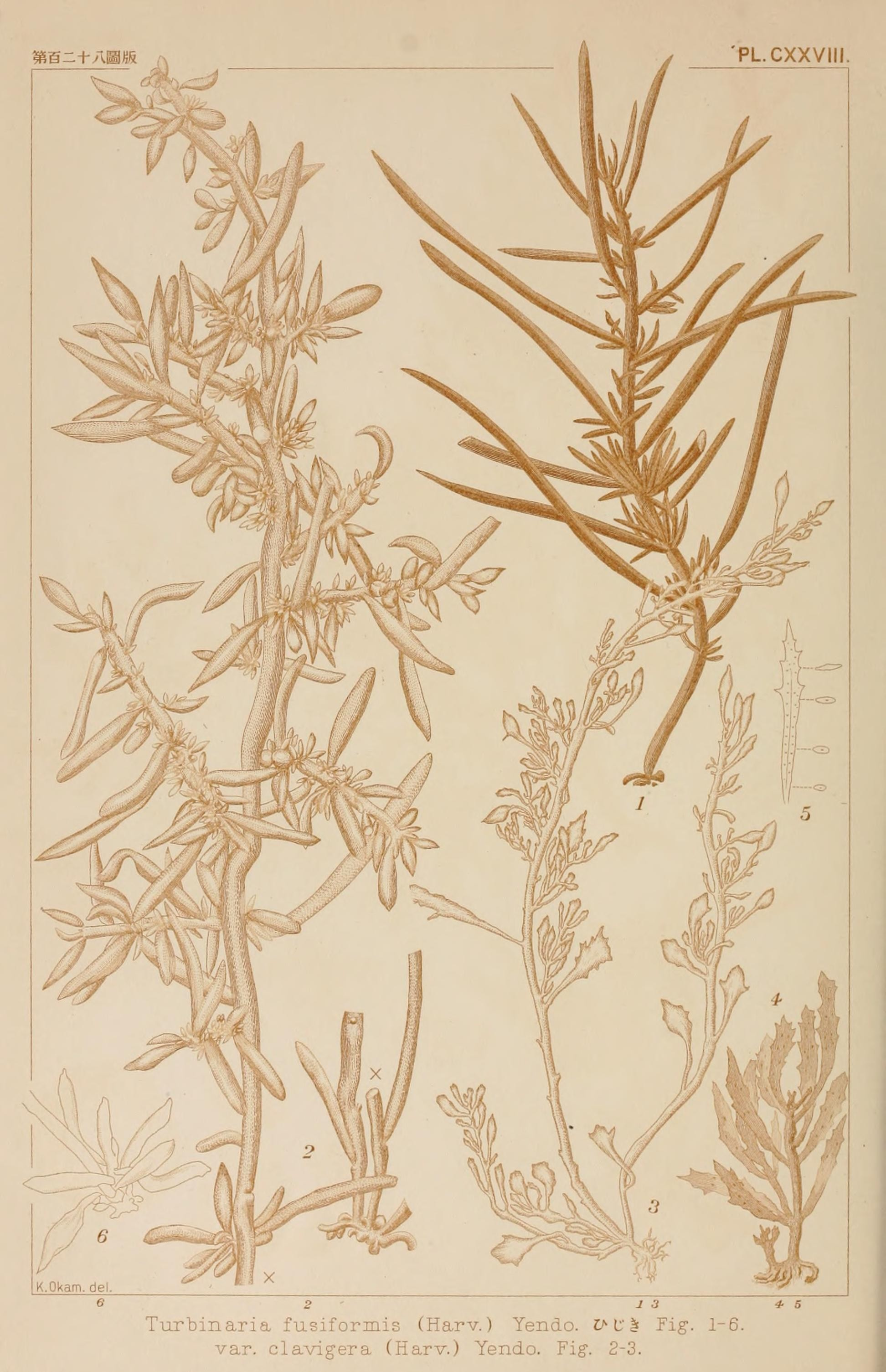

Scientific classification
- Domain: Eukaryota
- Supergroup: Stramenopiles
- Division: Ochrophyta
- Class: Phaeophyceae
- Order: Fucales
- Family: Sargassaceae
- Genus: Sargassum
- Species: S. fusiforme

Binomial name
- Sargassum fusiforme (Harv.) Setch., 1931

= Hijiki =

Species of seaweed

Hijiki (ヒジキ, 鹿尾菜 or 羊栖菜, hijiki) (Sargassum fusiforme, syn. Hizikia fusiformis), sometimes called hiziki or tot (Korean: 톳), is a brown seaweed that grows wild on the rocky coastlines of East Asia.

Hijiki has been a part of the Japanese culinary sphere and diet for centuries. Hijiki has been sold in United Kingdom natural products stores for 30 years and its culinary uses have been adopted in North America.

Recent studies have shown that hijiki contains potentially toxic quantities of inorganic arsenic, and the food safety agencies of several countries (excluding Japan), including Canada, the United Kingdom, and the United States, have advised against its consumption.

== In the West ==
In 1867 the word "hijiki" first appeared in an English-language publication: A Japanese and English Dictionary by James C. Hepburn.

Starting in the 1960s, the word "hijiki" started to be used widely in the United States, and the product (imported in dried form from Japan) became widely available at natural food stores and Asian-American grocery stores, due to the influence of the macrobiotic movement, and in the 1970s with the growing number of Japanese restaurants.

== Appearance and preparation ==
Hijiki is green to brown in colour when found in the wild. Fishermen and professional divers harvest the hijiki with a sickle at low tide during the spring tide from May to March. After collection, the seaweed is boiled and dried before being sold as dried hijiki. Once processed, dried hijiki turns black. To prepare dried hijiki for cooking, it is first soaked in water then cooked with ingredients like soy sauce and sugar to make a dish that goes by the same name.

In Japan, hijiki is normally eaten with other foods such as vegetables or fish. It may be added to foods that have been steamed, boiled, marinated in soy sauce or fish sauce, cooked in oil, or added to soup, stir fries or quiches. Hijiki may be mixed with rice, but not used as a wrap, to prepare sushi. Konjac is typically prepared with hijiki mixed in to give the dish known by the same name its characteristic grey color and texture.

In Korea, the seaweed is called tot (톳) and eaten as namul (seasoned vegetable side dish) or cooked with bap (rice).

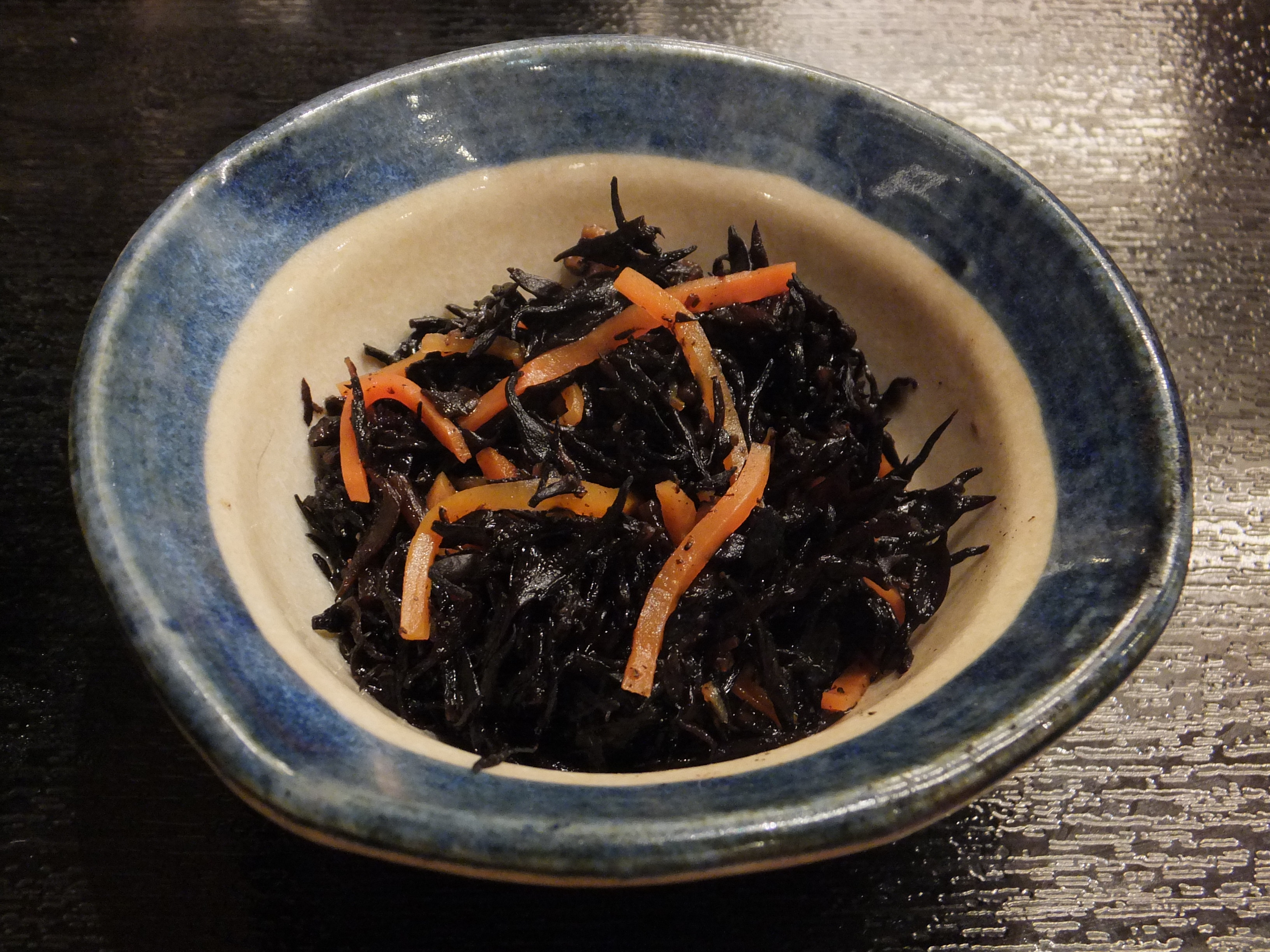
Japanese simmered hijiki

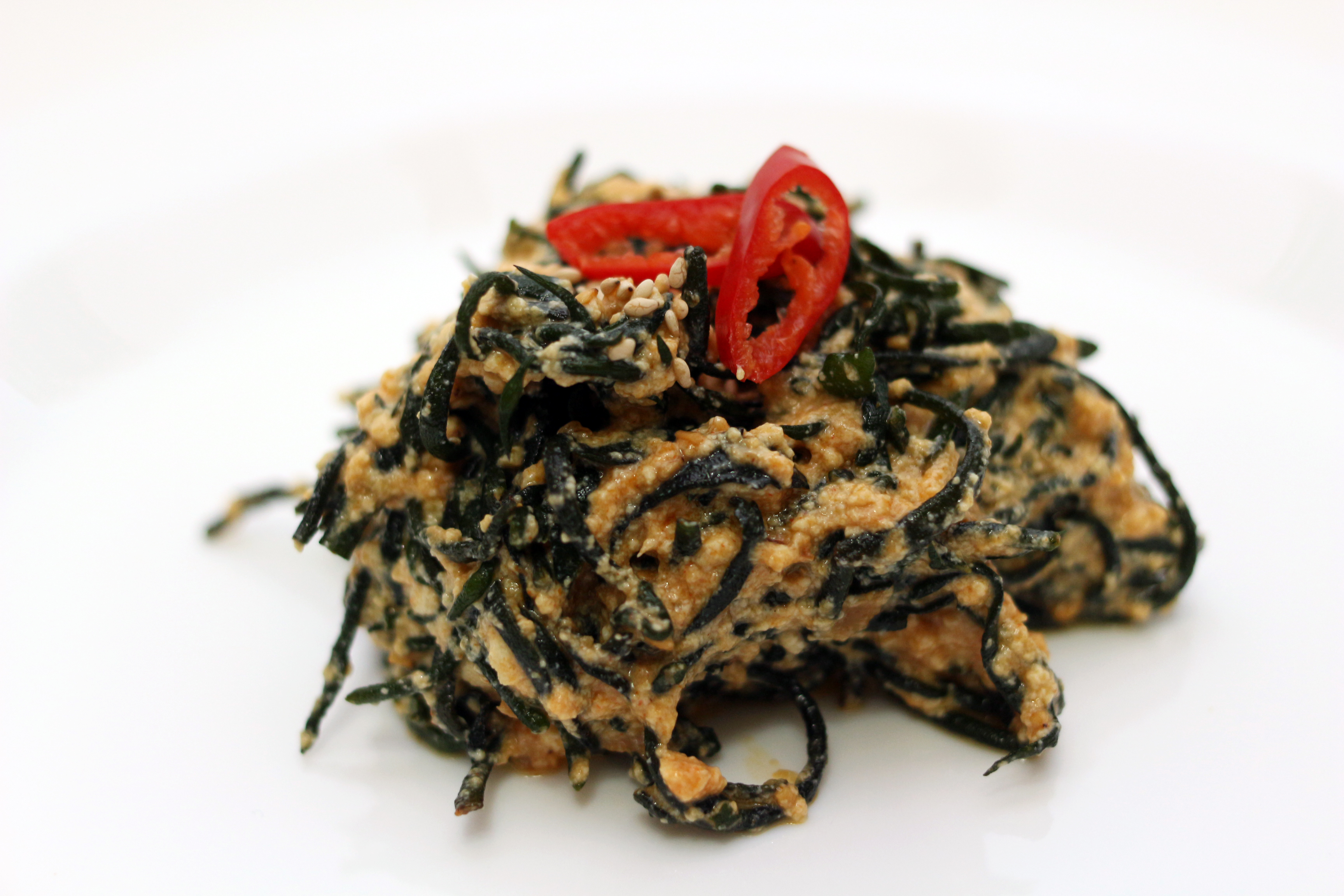
Korean tot-muchim (seasoned tot)

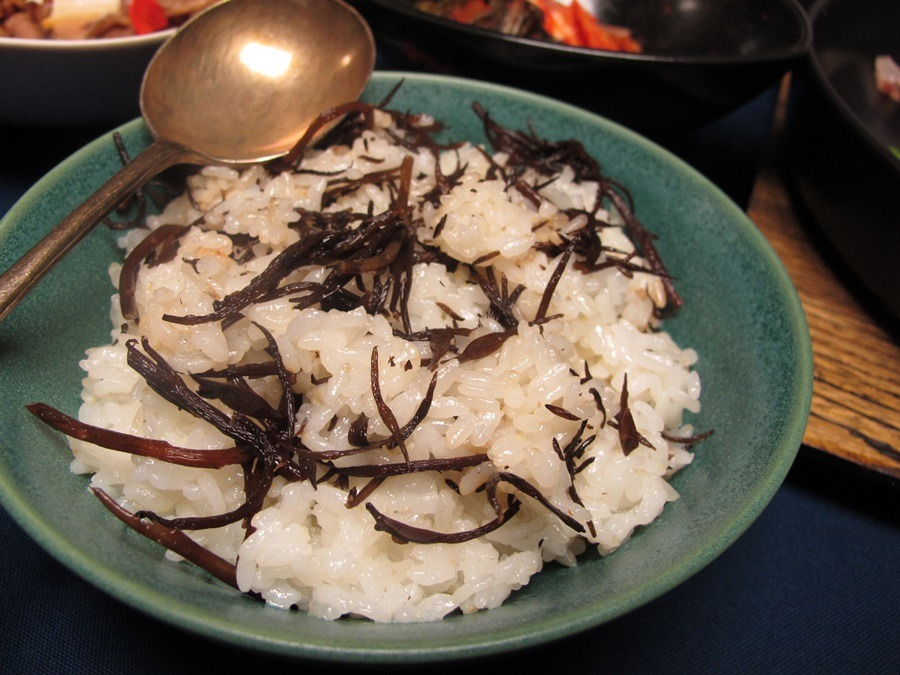
Korean totbap (tot rice)

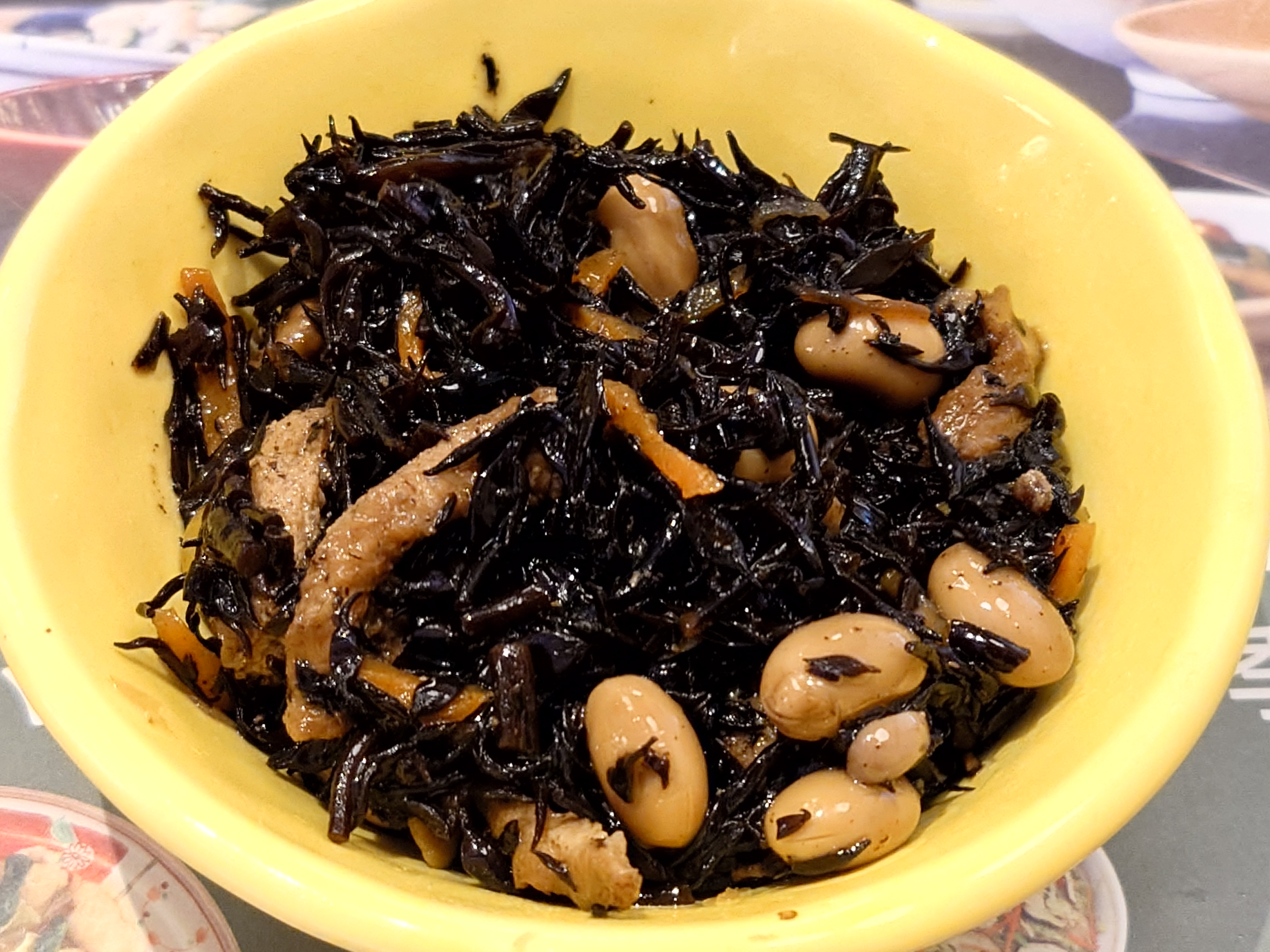
With peanuts and pork

== Arsenic health risk ==
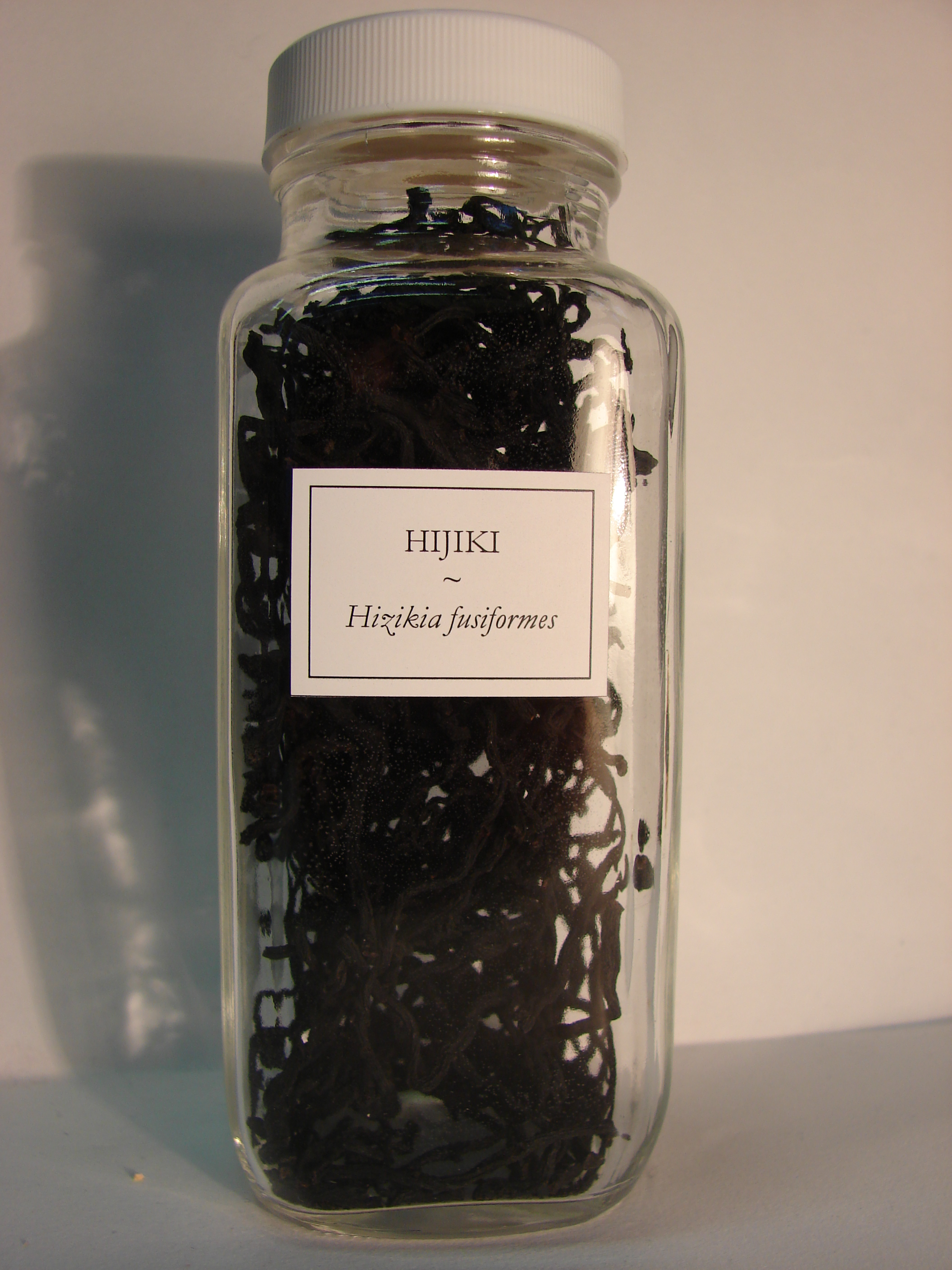
Dried hijiki in a bottle

Several government food safety agencies advise consumers to avoid consumption of hijiki seaweed. Testing showed that it contains significantly higher concentrations of inorganic arsenic than other types of seaweed, and these results have been independently verified. Government food safety agencies that advise against consumption include the Canadian Food Inspection Agency (CFIA), the Food Standards Agency (FSA) of the United Kingdom, and the United States Department of Agriculture (USDA).

The Ministry of Health, Labour and Welfare of Japan responded with a report pointing out that while the consumption of more than 4.7 g hijiki seaweed per day could result in an intake of inorganic arsenic that exceeds the tolerable daily intake for this substance, the average daily consumption for Japanese people is estimated at 0.9 g. Several of the reports from other food safety agencies acknowledged that occasional hijiki consumption was unlikely to cause significant health risks but advised against all consumption regardless. There are methods to process and greatly reduce arsenic from hijiki.

Although no known illnesses have been associated with consuming hijiki seaweed to date, inorganic arsenic has been identified as carcinogenic to humans. Exposure to inorganic arsenic has been linked with gastrointestinal effects, anemia, and liver damage. People who follow a macrobiotic diet that often includes large amounts of seaweed may be at greater risk.

== See also ==
- Arsenic poisoning
