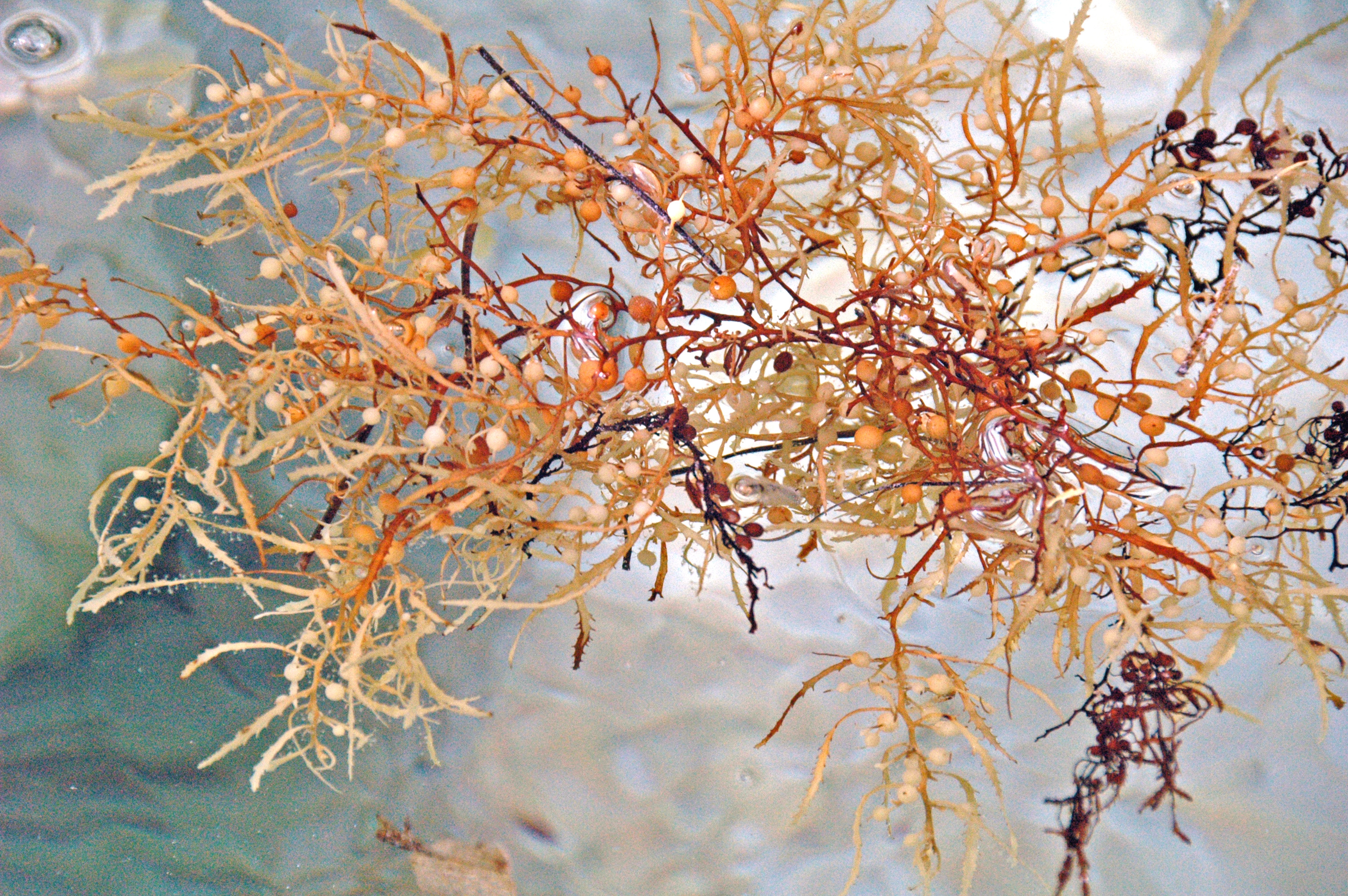

Scientific classification
- Domain: Eukaryota
- Supergroup: Stramenopiles
- Division: Ochrophyta
- Class: Phaeophyceae
- Order: Fucales
- Family: Sargassaceae
- Genus: Sargassum
- Species: S. natans

Binomial name
- Sargassum natans (Linnaeus) Gaillon

Synonyms
- Fucus natans Linnaeus, 1753

= Sargassum natans =

Species of macroalgae

Sargassum natans is a species of brown algae in the family Sargassaceae. In English the species goes by the common names common gulfweed, narrowleaf gulfweed, or spiny gulfweed.

== Taxonomy ==
S. natans has a wide range of possible morphological variation with its blades and floats. Originally this variation led to four morphotypes being described by Albert E. Parr in 1939, named S. natans I, II, VIII, and IX. The most prominent of these are S. natans I and S. natans VIII. In 2024, these prominent morphotypes were officially accepted as distinct subspecies of the algae due to greater morphological and genetic research. S. natans I is now named S. natans var. natans, and S. natans VIII is now named S. natans var. wingei. The latter subspecies' name comes from Danish biologist Øjvind Winge, who was the first to describe the subspecies.

== Distribution ==
S. natans historically occurs in the Sargasso Sea, Gulf of Mexico, Caribbean Sea, and Gulf Stream. However, since the early 2010s, the geographic range has expanded southwards to the coasts of Brazil and eastwards to Nigeria. The algae has also drastically increased in population within its historic range. It, along with Sargassum fluitans, have been credited with plaguing beach tourism industry in Yucatán and South Florida. The reason for this expansion is not completely understood.

== Biology ==
S. natans is one of two pelagic species of Sargassum, the other species S. fluitans. The algae reproduces by fragmentation.

== Ecology ==
S. natans species serves as a substrate for colonial hydrozoans, including Aglaophenia latecarinata, which has been reported to cover more than 40% of the macroalgae's surface in some cases. Other epibiota often associated with the algae include bryozoans, annelids, and other species of algae. S. natans is also the habitat for many species found only amongst species of Sargassum, including the Sargassum crab, Sargassum fish, Sargassum pipefish, and Sargassum snail.
