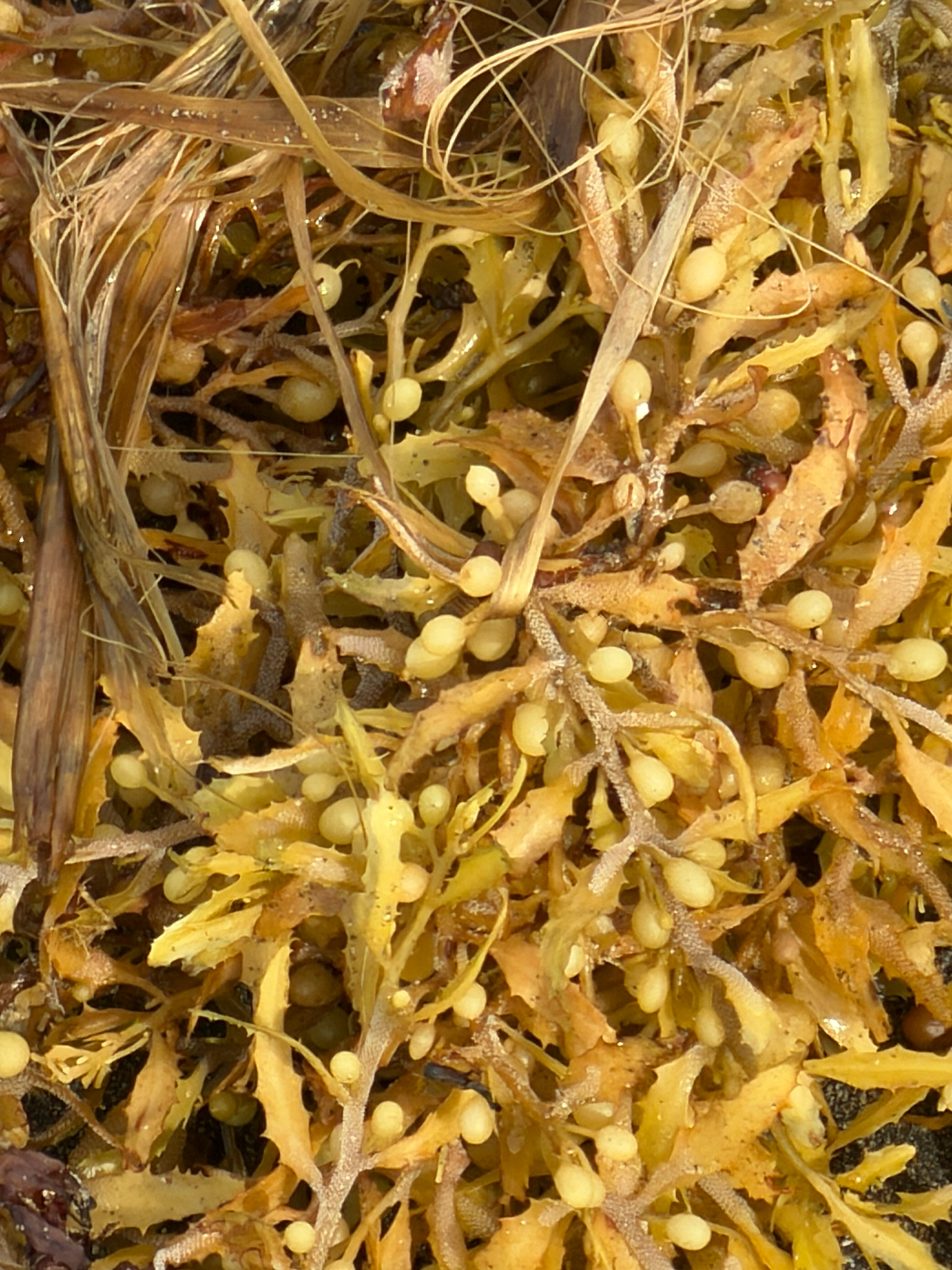

Scientific classification
- Domain: Eukaryota
- Clade: Sar
- Clade: Stramenopiles
- Division: Ochrophyta
- Class: Phaeophyceae
- Order: Fucales
- Family: Sargassaceae
- Genus: Sargassum
- Species: S. fluitans

Binomial name
- Sargassum fluitans (Børgesen) Børgesen, 1914

Synonyms
- Sargassum hystrix var. fluitans Børgesen, 1914

= Sargassum fluitans =

Species of macroalgae

Sargassum fluitans is a species of brown algae in the family Sargassaceae, first described by Danish botanist Frederik Børgesen in 1914. In English, it is sometimes referred to as broad-leaved gulfweed.

== Ecology ==
It occurs in the tropical and subtropical Atlantic Ocean, including the Sargasso Sea. It is a holopelagic species, living entirely in the open ocean as floating mats. Like other pelagic Sargassum species, it reproduces primarily by fragmentation. It, along with Sargassum natans, have been credited with negatively affecting the beach tourism industry in Yucatán and South Florida. This species serves as a floating substrate for a diverse community of epibiotic organisms, including colonial hydrozoans and other invertebrates.
