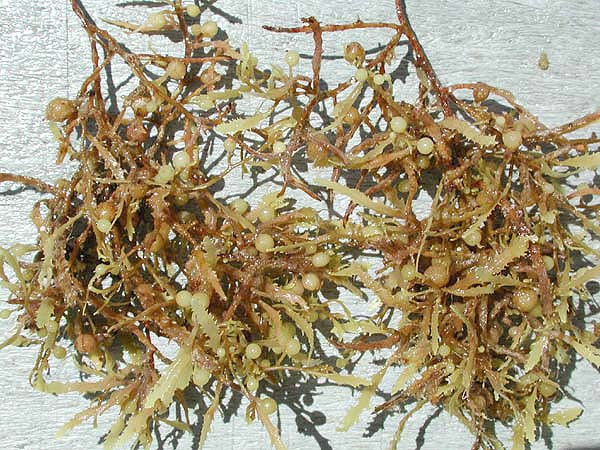

Scientific classification
- Domain: Eukaryota
- Supergroup: Stramenopiles
- Division: Ochrophyta
- Class: Phaeophyceae
- Order: Fucales
- Family: Sargassaceae
- Genus: Sargassum; C. Agardh

Species
- See list

= Sargassum =

Sargassum Temporal range: Oligocene–present

Genus of brown algae

Sargassum is a genus of brown macroalgae (seaweed) in the order Fucales of the class Phaeophyceae. This brown macroalgae is spread predominantly in tropical and subtropical areas. It comes from the Sargasso Sea, which was named because it hosts large amounts of Sargassum. Sargassum can extend for kilometers across the ocean surface, forming golden brown drifting mats that move with the currents and wind; in recent years, Sargassum has been known for arriving in large quantities throughout the Caribbean region. More recently, scientists have found using satellite data that a new hotspot has been forming from western Africa and extends into the Caribbean Sea, called the Great Atlantic Sargassum Belt (GASB).

Most of the macroalgae species inhabit shallow coastal waters and coral reefs, but some are planktonic (free-floating) or pelagic after being detached from reefs during storms. Sargassum includes two holopelagic species, Sargassum natans and Sargassum fluitans, with other species interconnected. These species are distinguished to reproduce solely by clonal reproduction through fragmentation. Sargassum plays an important ecological role in the open ocean because it provides a vital habitat for a variety of marine species, including fish, crabs, sea turtles, migratory birds and other organisms. However, when large amounts of Sargassum accumulate in the shore and start to decompose it forms what is known as Sargassum brown tides (SBT). SBT alters the water column by changing the appearance of the water and in addition alters the water quality by reducing light penetration, decreasing dissolved oxygen and changing the pH of the coastal waters. As a result, it affects seagrass meadows, corals, mangroves and coastal communities that depend on tourism.

== History ==
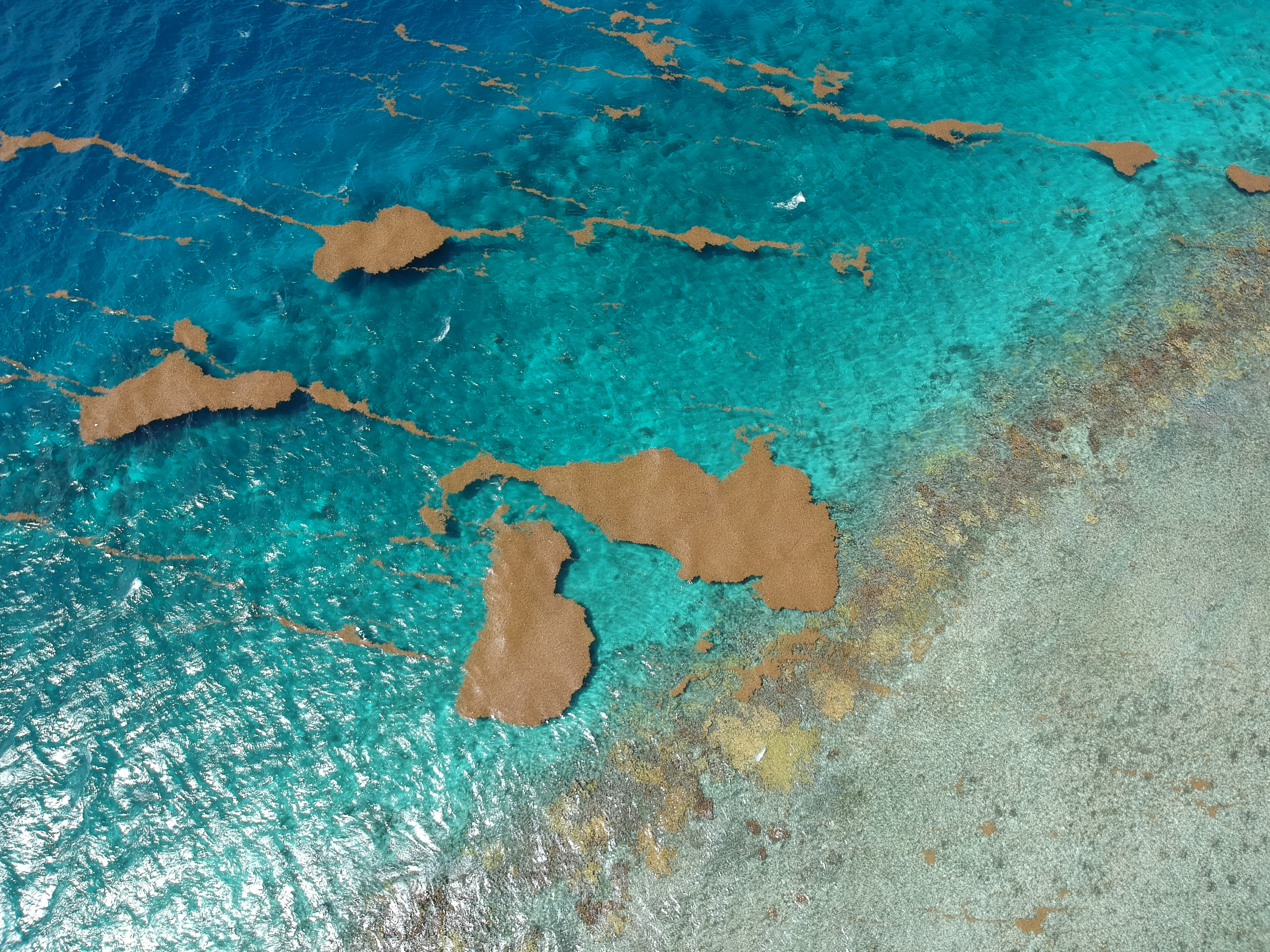
Aerial view of floating Sargassum near the coral reef crest in La Parguera, Puerto Rico (June 2021)

Sargassum was named after sargaço (or sarga, or also salgazo), which was the name of a local wild grape variety in Portugal. Portuguese sailors who found the floating macroalgae in the Sargasso Sea noticed the small air-filled bladders that keep the seaweed afloat.

The earliest mention in history of the Sargassum may be traced to the times of Cristobal Columbus in his maritime letters "Relaciones y Cartas" of the first voyage, where he mentions having encountered great masses of floating algae that made navigation difficult. Sargassum had, however, acquired a legendary reputation as it expands through the entire Sargasso Sea, and blocks ships movements, but since then, it has since been discovered that it happens in drifts only.

== Taxonomy and classification ==
Sargassum is a genus of over 300 species of brown macroalgae (seaweed) in the order Fucales of the class Phaeophyceae. It is one of the members of the proposed Chromista kingdom. Sargassum is spread predominantly in tropical and subtropical areas of the world. The species vary in size, shape and location. There are those that are attached (benthic) and others that are free floating (holopelagic). As mentioned before, the Caribbean receives two interconnected species, Sargassum natans and Sargassum fluitans.

== Evolution ==
Fossils of a floating brown algae reminiscent of modern Sargassum are common in certain layers of the Early Oligocene-aged Menilite Formation of Poland, in what was once the Paratethys Sea, suggesting that floating Sargassum mats have been a dominant feature of certain oceanic ecosystems for tens of millions of years. In addition to providing a minimum age for Sargassum, associated with these fossil algae are fossils of shallow-water fishes and crabs, despite these fossil deposits otherwise preserving deepwater fish fossils. This species assemblage closely resembles that found in the modern Sargasso Sea, and has been nicknamed a "quasi-Sargasso" assemblage.

== Description ==
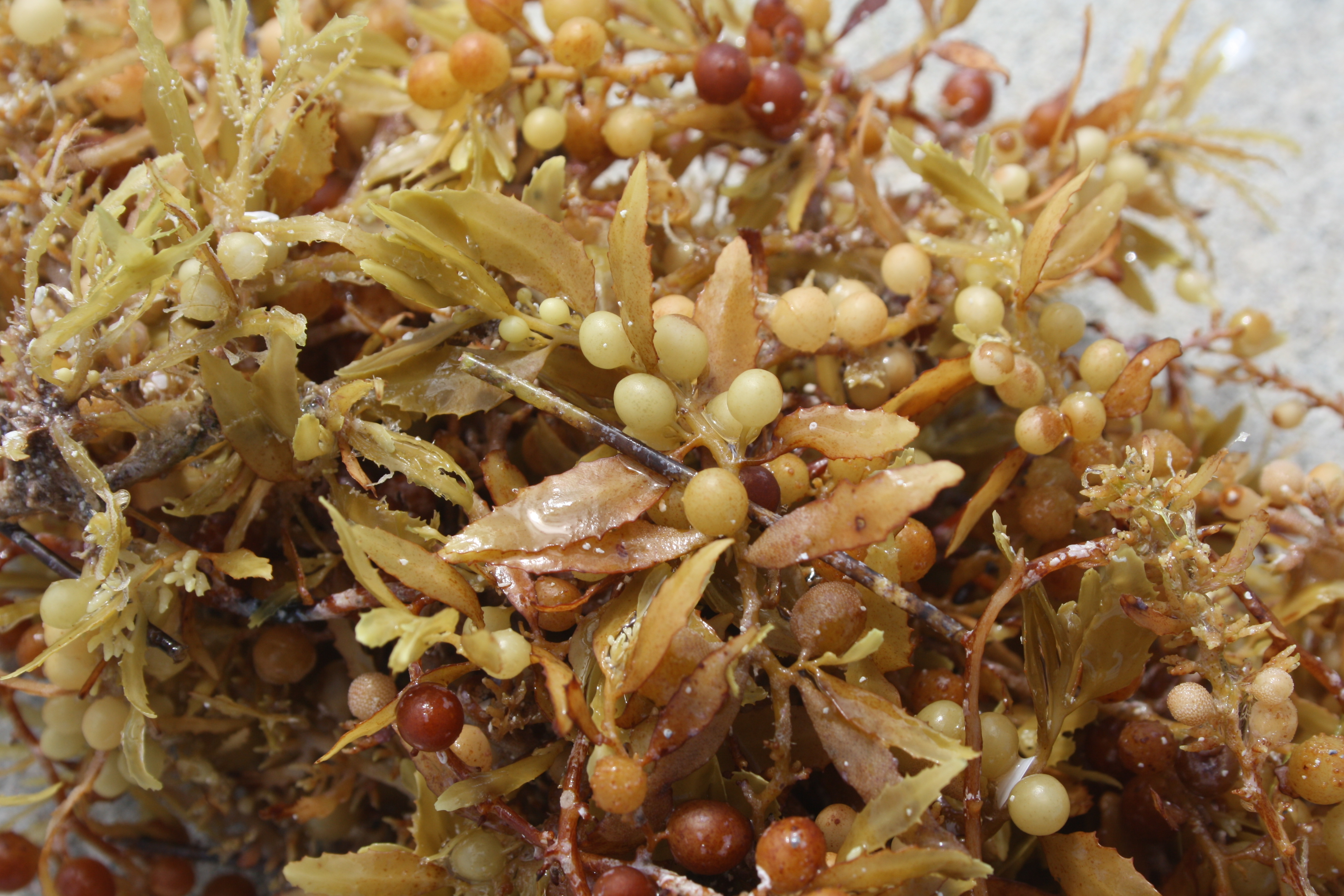
Close-up of Sargassum, showing the air bladders that help it stay afloat

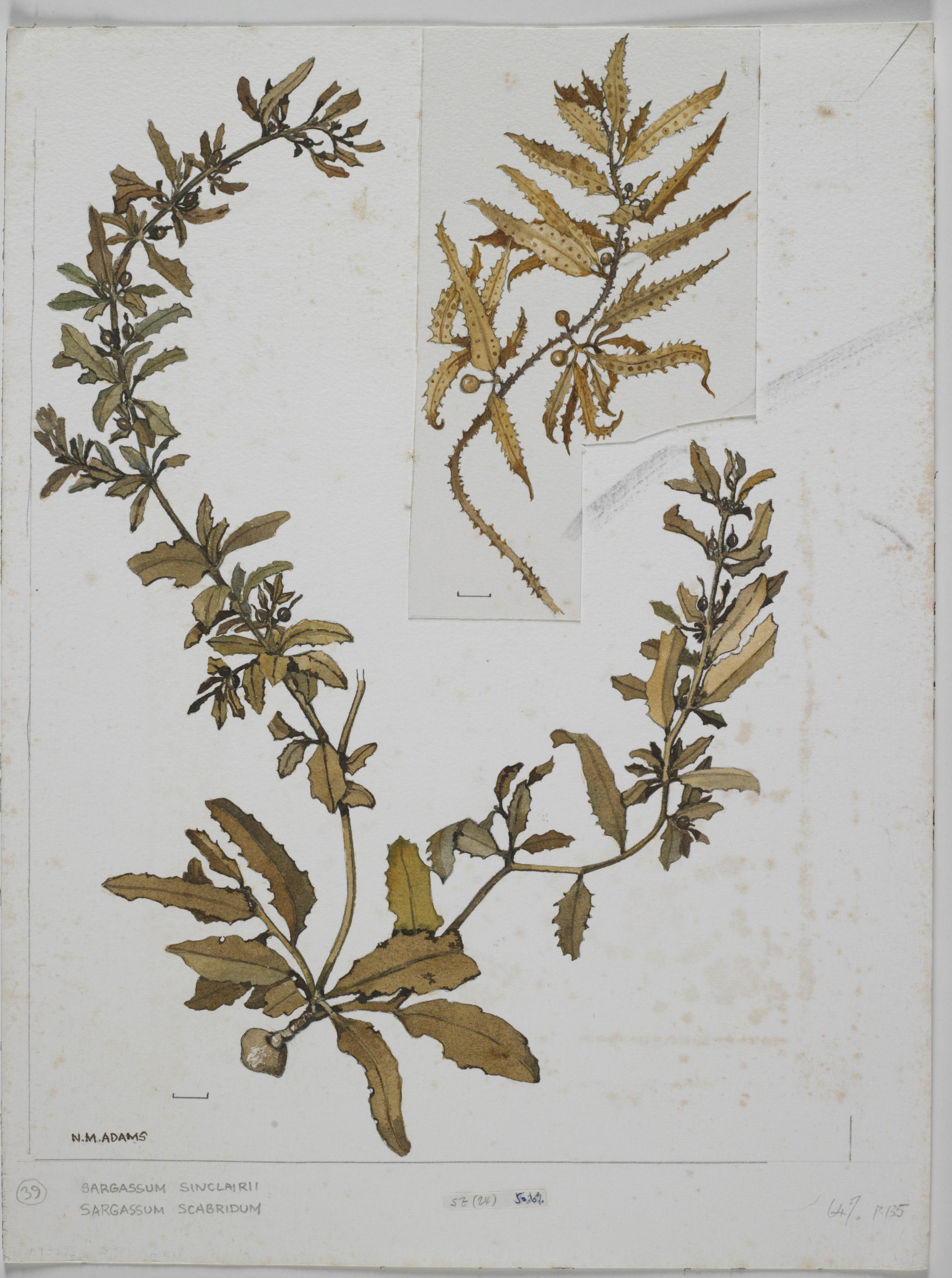
Watercolour illustration of Sargassum seaweed specimens

Species of this genus of brown algae may reach up to several metres in length. They are brown or dark olive green in color, and consist of a holdfast, a stipe, and fronds or branches. Oogonia and antheridia occur in conceptacles embedded in receptacles on special branches.

Most of the species of Sargassum have spherical, gaseous bladders, called pneumatocysts, which provide buoyancy to the fronds and keep them close to the surface so they can get the maximum amount of light to carry out photosynthesis. The fronds are frequently rough and slightly sticky in feel, and their structure is loose yet strong allowing the algae to endure the waves and the great force of the water currents. The morphological difference within the genus is also significant and tends to change according to the environmental factors, including the water flow, nutritional supply, and the light intensity.

== Distribution and ocean currents ==
The physical drivers behind Sargassum inundation events are prevailing winds and ocean surface currents. The Caribbean is located in a region heavily affected by trade winds. Trade winds are strong, consistent northeasterlies winds which blow dust-filled dry air from the Sahara across the Atlantic. Trade winds additionally play a critical role in the annual hurricane season in the Western Atlantic. The Caribbean Current and Antilles branch of the Atlantic North Equatorial Current are the major current transporters of Sargassum in the region.

Researchers have recently begun using Moderate Resolution Imaging Spectroradiometer satellite imagery and ocean current data to track and forecast inundation events with a high level of accuracy.

== Ecology ==
The Sargasso Sea has large pelagic mats of Sargassum, making it one of the few areas that can develop an ecosystem in the open-ocean region that has no land boundaries. Drifting Sargassum patches acts as a refuge for many species in different parts of their development, but also as a permanent residence for endemic species that can only be found living on and within the Sargassum. These endemic organisms have specialized patterns and colorations that mimic the Sargassum and allow them to be camouflaged in their environment. In total, Sargassum mats are home to more than 11 phyla and over 100 different species. There are also a total of 81 fish species (36 families represented) that reside in the Sargassum or utilize it for parts of their life cycles. Other marine organisms, such as young sea turtles, will use the Sargassum as shelter and a resource for food until they reach a size at which they can survive elsewhere. Below is a list of organisms that are associated with the Sargassum.

The Sargasso Sea plays a major role in the migration of catadromous eel species such as the European eel, the American eel, and the American conger eel. The larvae of these species hatch within the sea and as they grow they travel to Europe or the East Coast of North America. Later in life, the matured eel migrates back to the Sargasso Sea to spawn and lay eggs. It is also believed that after hatching, young loggerhead sea turtles use currents, such as the Gulf Stream, to travel to the Sargasso Sea, where they use the Sargassum as cover from predators until they are mature.

Sargassum also serve as a trophic link between the ocean surface and the seabed. Isopods of the species Bathyopsurus nybelini at depths of 5002–6288 m in the Puerto Rico Trench and Mid-Cayman spreading center have been observed consuming Sargassum. They even exhibit several adaptations for it, such as microbiomes capable of breaking down the seaweed and fixing nitrogen, specialized swimming strokes, and serrated, grinding mouthparts.

Organisms found in the pelagic Sargassum patches,

A more comprehensive list: List of species associated with pelagic Sargassum

- Arthropods
  - Amphipods
  - Skeleton shrimp
  - Crabs
  - Copepods
  - Shrimp
  - Sea Spiders
- Worms
  - Annelid worms
  - Flatworms
- Mollusks
  - Nudibranchs
  - Snails
  - Squid
- Fish
  - Sargassum fish
  - Porcupinefish
  - Triplefin
  - Planehead filefish
  - European eel
  - American eel
  - American conger eel
- Others
  - Sea turtles
  - Hydrozoans

Sargassum species are found throughout tropical areas of the world and are often the most obvious macrophyte in near-shore areas where Sargassum beds often occur near coral reefs. The plants grow subtidally and attach to coral, rocks, or shells in moderately exposed or sheltered rocky or pebble areas. In some cases, these tropical populations often undergo seasonal cycles of growth and decay in concert with seasonal changes in sea temperature. In tropical Sargassum species that are often preferentially consumed by herbivorous fishes and echinoids, a relatively low level of phenolics and tannins occurs.

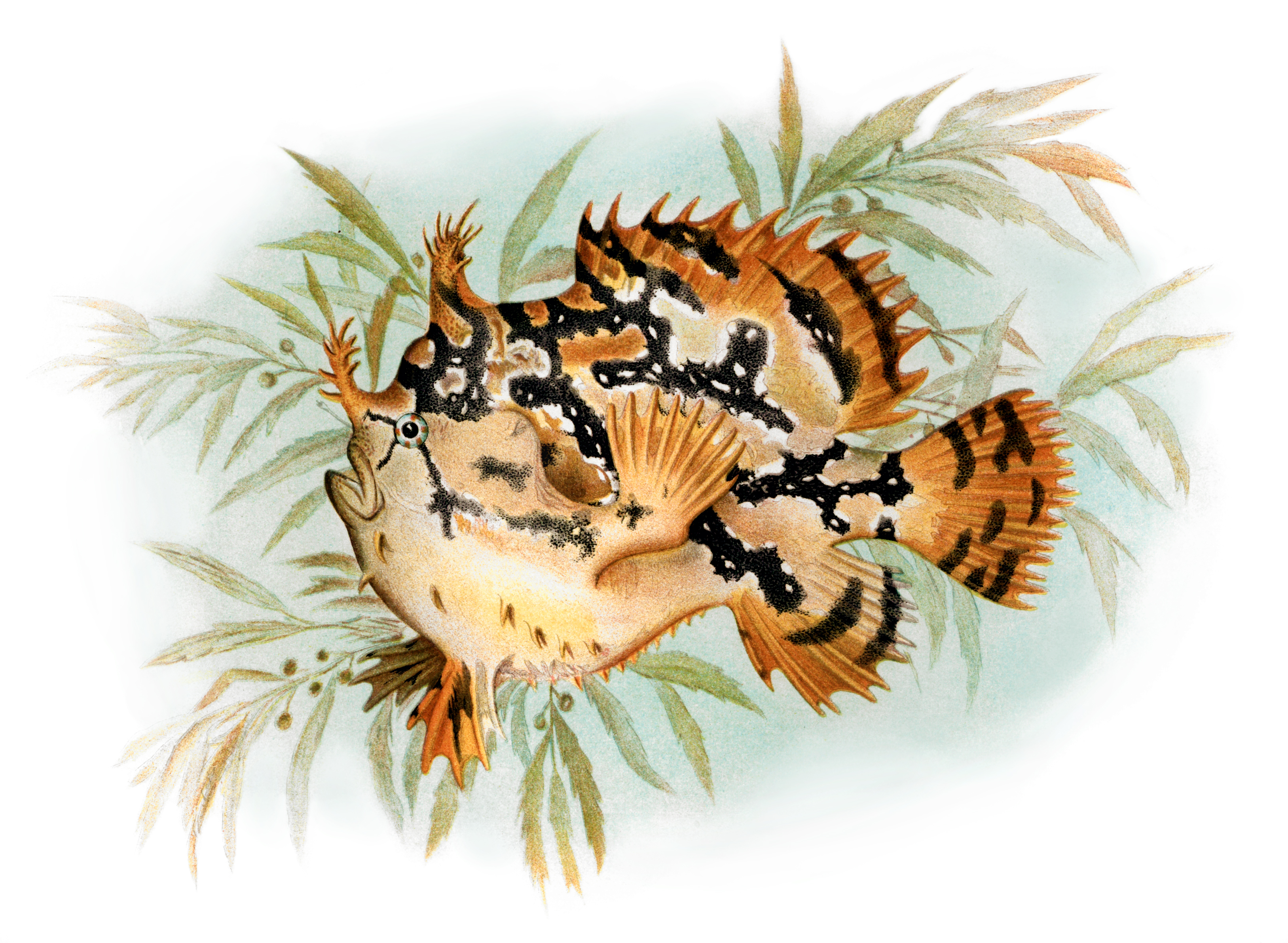
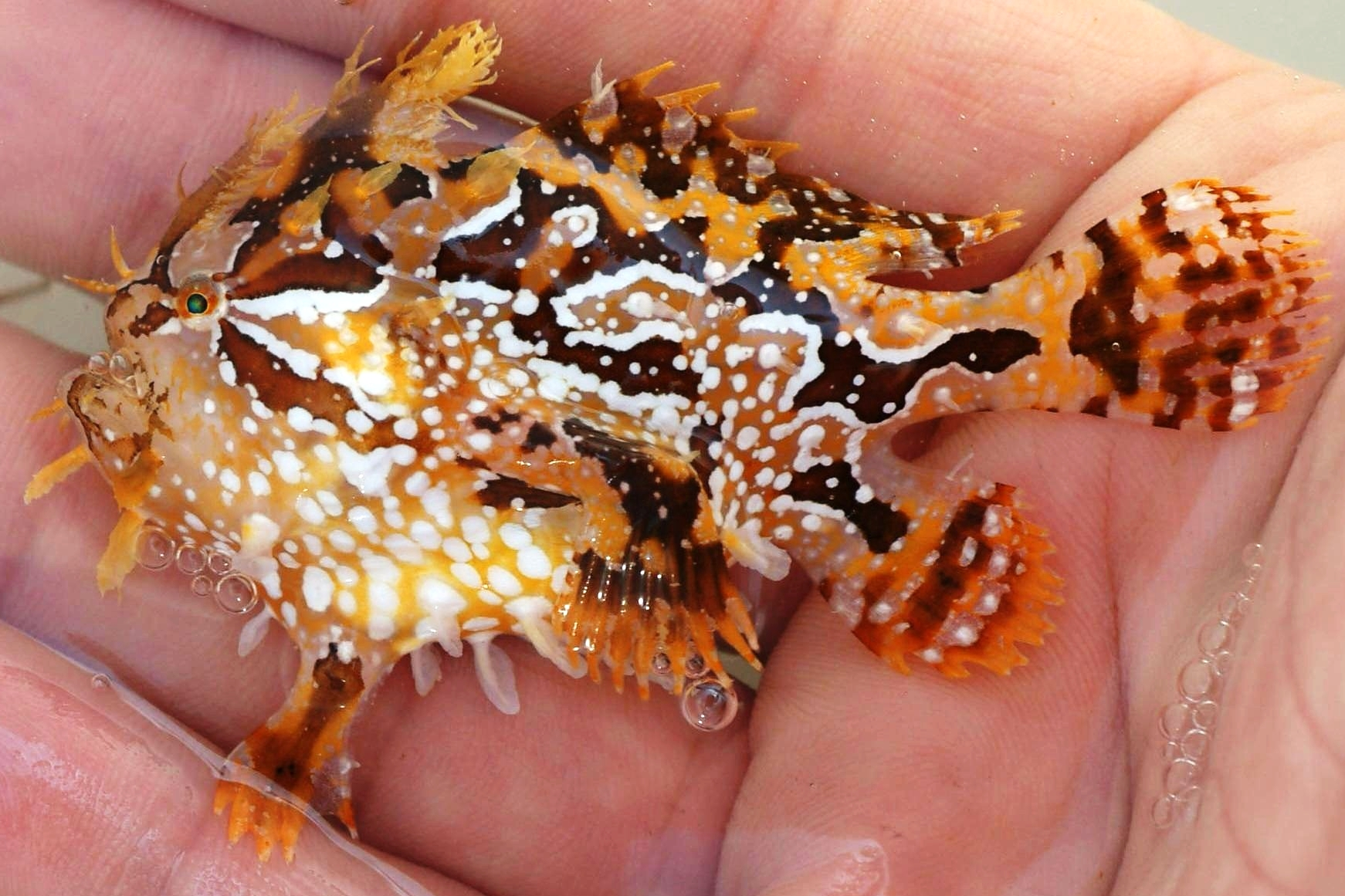
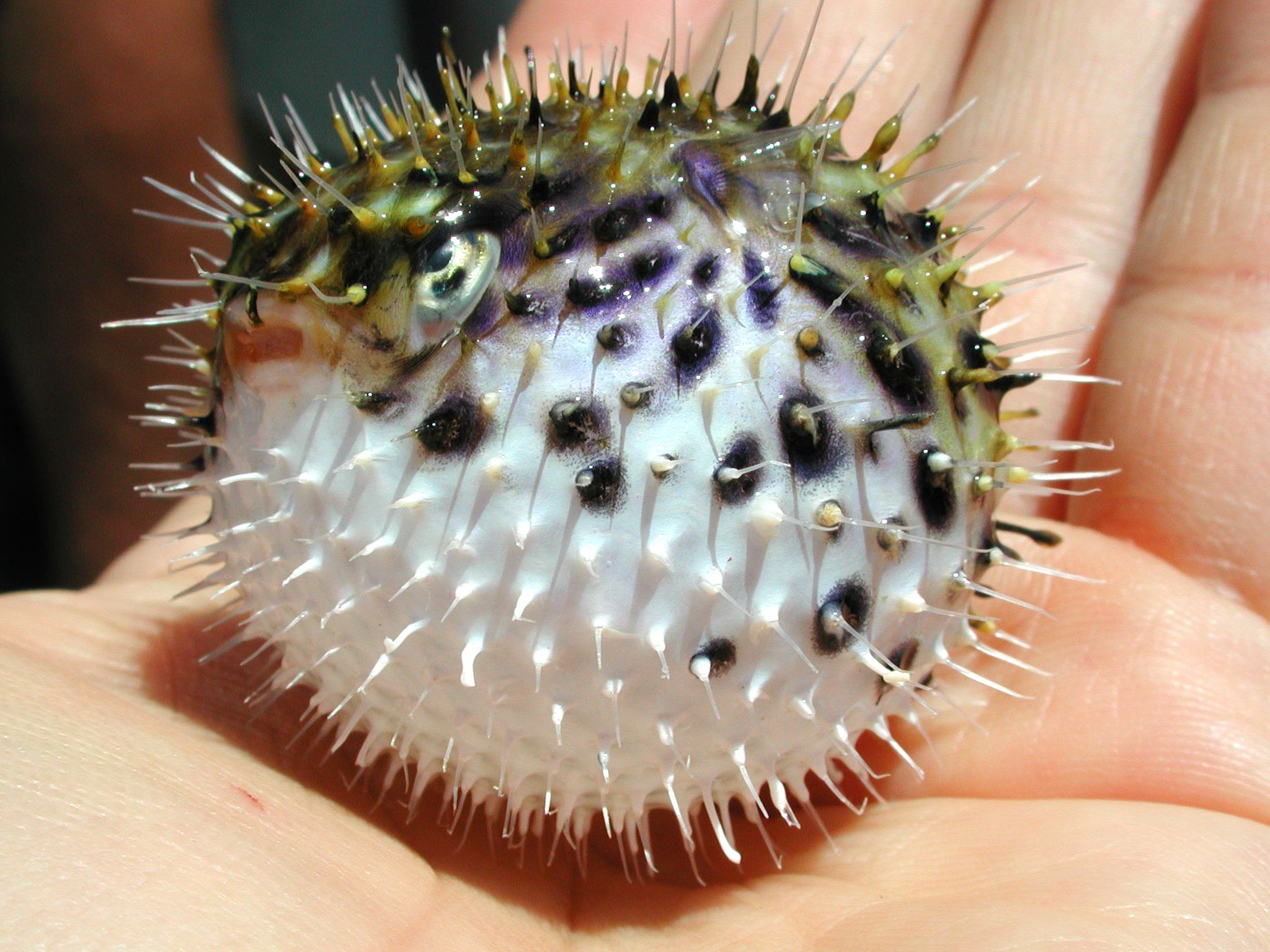
The camouflaged Sargassum fish (left) has adapted to live among drifting Sargassum seaweed. It is usually a small fish (center).
Some other small fish, such as this juvenile puffer (right), are also found in Sargassum.

=== Biological impacts ===
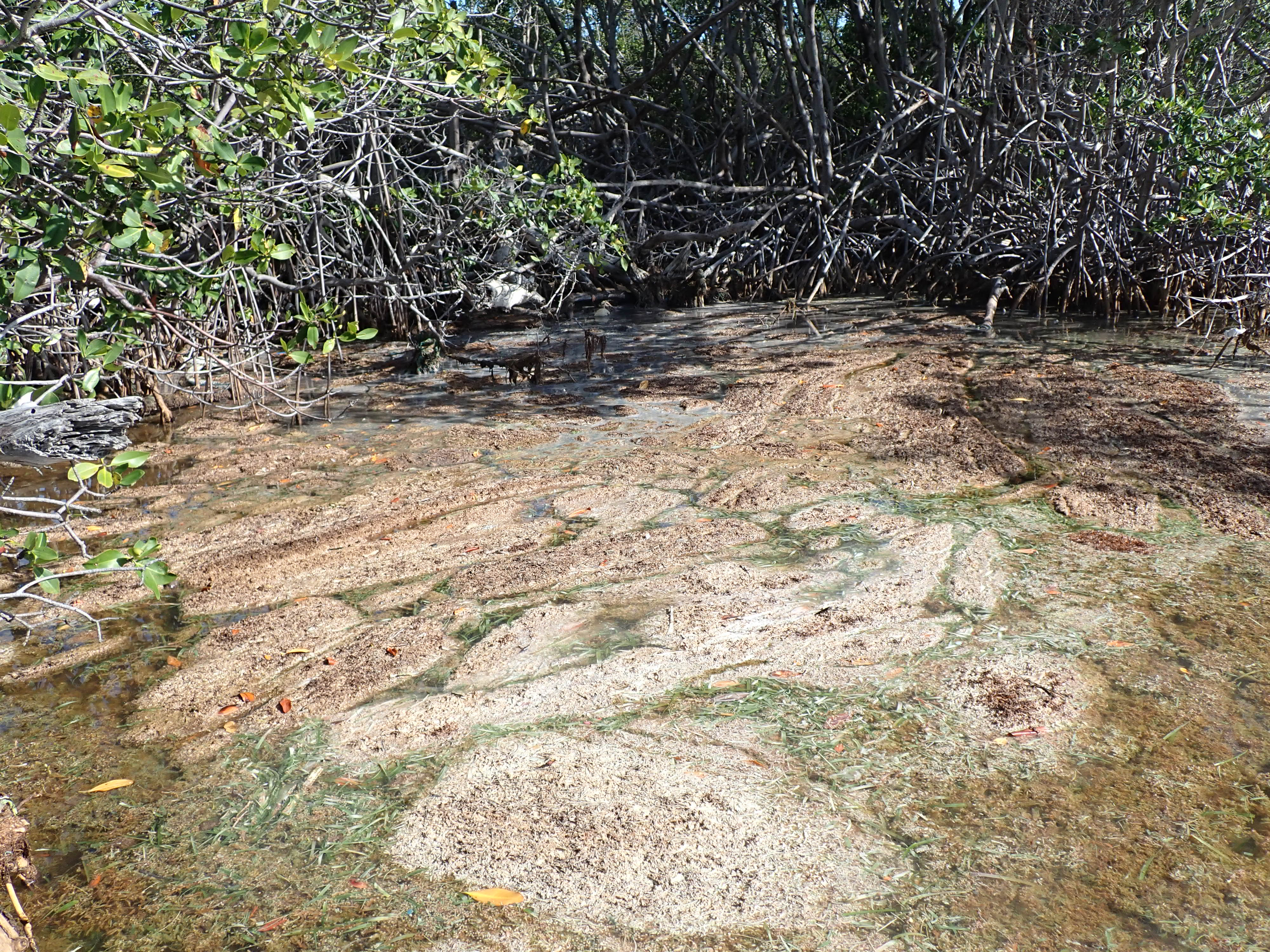
Decomposing Sargassum accumulation in a mangrove area at Isla Guayacán, Lajas, Puerto Rico (June 24, 2021). The photo shows decayed algae mixed with seagrass and mangrove roots during field sampling.

Unprecedented Sargassum inundation events cause a range of biological and ecological impacts in affected regions. The decomposition of large quantities of Sargassum along coastlines consumes oxygen, creating large oxygen-depleted zones resulting in fish kills. Decomposing Sargassum additionally creates hydrogen sulfide gas (H_{2}S), which causes a range of health impacts in humans. During the Sargassum inundation event in 2018, 11,000 Acute Sargassum Toxicity cases were reported in an 8-month span on just the Caribbean islands of Guadeloupe and Martinique. Massive amounts of floating Sargassum present a physical barrier preventing corals and seagrasses from receiving sufficient light, fouling boat propellers, and entangling marine turtles and mammals. Sargassum influx imposes major problems of organic matter and nutrients in the offshore and inshore waters, changing the nutrient balance and possibly influencing the quality of oceanic waters. As much as these transfers might have short time positive effects on productivity, long term ecological impacts of these transfers are not well understood. Further investigations into the environmental causes, nutrient, and biogeochemical feed-backs of the Sargassum blooms are also necessary, since the occurrence has become more common and intense over the tropical Atlantic and Caribbean.

=== Nutrient factors ===
The Sargasso Sea, a known source area for Sargassum blooms, is classified as an oligotrophic region. With warm, oxygen-poor waters and low nutrient contents, biomass production is limited by what little nutrients are present. Historically, low nutrient levels in the Sargasso Sea have limited Sargassum production. New influxes of nitrogen and phosphorus are driving factors in increased biomass production.

Recent studies have found three likely drivers of nutrient influx linked to increasing Sargassum biomass: an increase in nutrient output from the Amazon River, increased nutrients in the Gulf of Mexico, and coastal upwelling off the West African Coast which transfers deep nutrient-rich waters to the upper water column where Sargassum resides. Nutrient output from the Amazon River has been shown to have a direct delayed effect on large inundation events, which occur one to two years after years of high nutrient output. Phosphates and iron transported via the trade winds from North Africa have been reported to have a fertilizing effect on Sargassum growth; further data is required to understand its role in causing inundating blooms. Researchers globally agree that continued research is required to quantify the effect of marine chemical changes and other environmental factors in the recent increase in Sargassum biomass and inundation events.

=== Climate change ===
Variations in sea level, salinity, water temperature, chemical composition, rainfall patterns, and water acidity all play roles in regulating algae blooms. As anthropogenic forces increase the variability of these factors, the frequency, duration, severity and geographic range of harmful algae blooms have increased, causing millions of dollars of lost revenue as well as damaging fragile coastal and coral ecosystems.

=== "Coastal inundations" by washed-ashore Sargassum ===
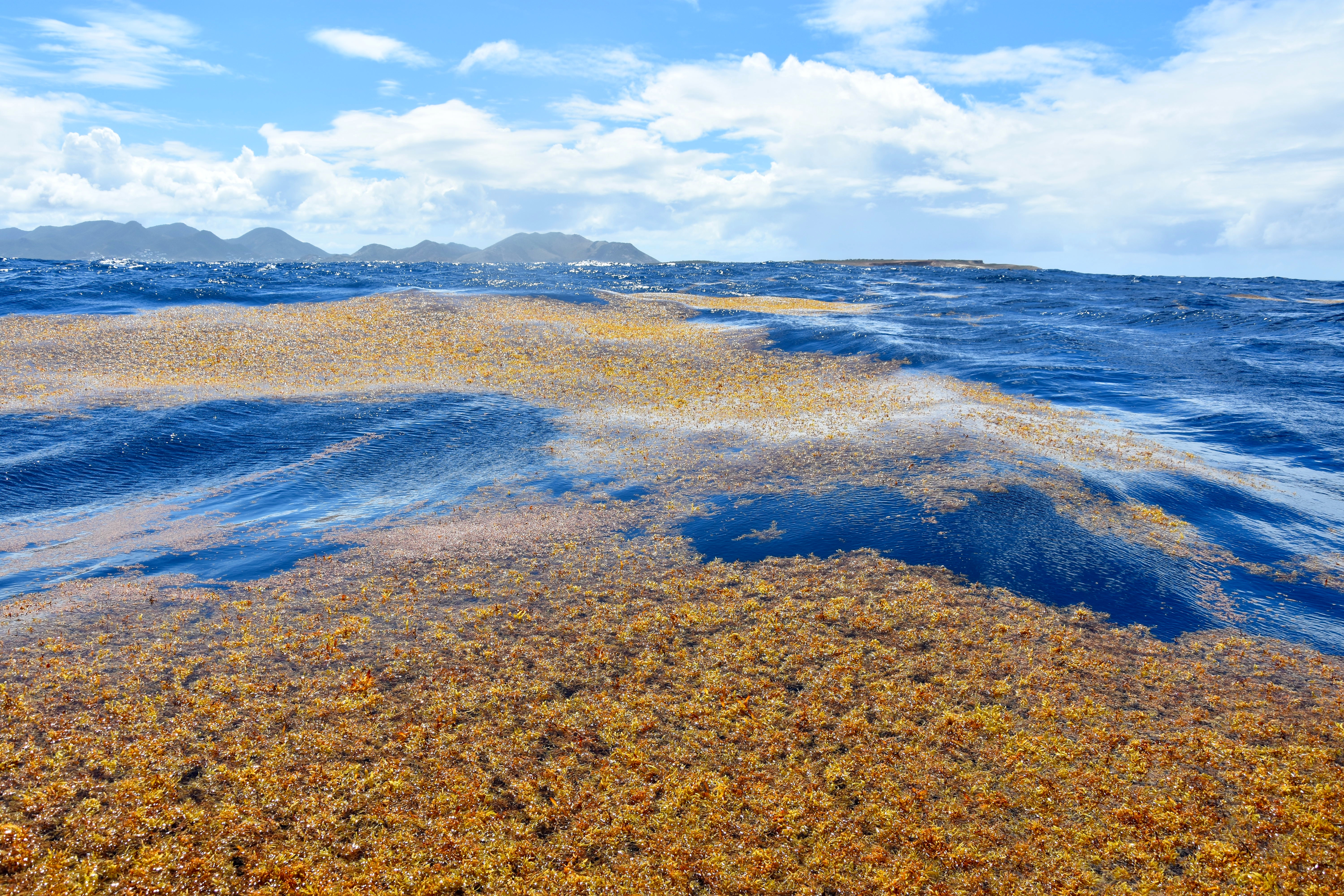
Large patches of Sargassum adrift near the island of Saint Martin

In limited amounts, washed-ashore Sargassum plays an important role in maintaining Atlantic and Caribbean coastal ecosystems. Once ashore, Sargassum provides vital nutrients such as carbon, nitrogen, and phosphorus to coastal ecosystems which border the nutrient-poor waters of the western North Atlantic tropics and subtropics. Additionally, it decreases coastal erosion.

Beginning in 2011, unprecedented quantities of Sargassum began inundating coastal areas in record amounts. Coastlines in Brazil, the Caribbean, Gulf of Mexico, and the east coast of Florida saw quantities of Sargassum wash ashore up to three feet deep. The first major Sargassum inundation event in 2011 had a biomass increase of 200-fold compared to the previous eight years average bloom size. Since 2011, increasingly stronger inundation events have occurred every 2–3 years. During a Sargassum inundation event in 2018, one Sargassum bloom measured over 1,600 square kilometers, more than three times the average size. As of 2018, inundation events caused millions of dollars of lost revenue in the tourism industry, especially hurting small Caribbean countries whose economies are highly dependent on seasonal tourism.

While the Sargasso Sea is a known source of Sargassum blooms, variations in the Sargassum types composing these inundation events have led researchers to believe that the Sargasso Sea is not the point of origin of inundating Sargassum. Sargassum natans I and Sargassum fluitans III are the dominant Sargassum species found in the Sargasso Sea. 2015 net sampling studies have found Sargassum natans VIII, a previously rare type, is constituting a dominating percentage of Sargassum biodiversity in the Western Atlantic and Sargasso Sea.

== Resource management ==
=== Monitoring and forecasting ===
The use of satellite-based remote sensing and algorithmic methods to detect Sargassum blooms have been important in monitoring and anticipating the blooms through the adoption of the method of differentiating floating macroalgae among other ocean structures. The most common are Floating Algae Index (FAI), Alternative Floating Algae Index (AFAI) and the Maximum Chlorophyll Index (MCI). These algorithms provides differences in spectral variations between the near-infrared band and the red band by enhancing the floating vegetation on the water surface. Recent research, multispectral and hyperspectral satellite sensors include MODIS, VIIRS, Sentinel-2 MSI and PlanetScope imagery among others, have been added by researchers to improve spatial resolution and accuracy of temporal monitoring to detect these Sargassum influxes. The formation of the Great Atlantic Sargassum Belt (GASB) also was analyzed with the help of multi-sensor satellites and it was a new era in monitoring. The near-real-time maps, forecasts and warning systems of Sargassum inundation are now available in monitoring sites like University of South Florida, Optical Oceanography Laboratory (USF-Oceans), CARICOOS, NOAA COASTWATCH OCEANVIEWER, Sargassum Observation Modelling and Forecasting, and SIMAR-SATsum

=== Mitigation and cleanup ===
Mitigation and cleanup strategies to implement the Sargassum accumulation by the local infrastructure and resources are based on the resources and the extent of the occurrence. The coastal settlements in the Caribbean, West Africa and the privatized sectors have also developed joint management systems to decrease ecological and economic impacts. One of the most frequently found short-term responses to big influxes is mechanical removal of Sargassum by the use of tractors, conveyor belts, and floating barriers but again, unless they are well controlled may disrupt nesting grounds, benthic habitats and coastal dunes. New technologies such as booms, nets, and skimmers are currently being introduced to intercept the Sargassum at the sea before it reaches the shore.

As of 2016, environmental agencies and research organizations investigated vaporization solutions by collecting Sargassum and turning it into compost, biofertilizers, biogas, or construction materials. Although these reuse programs have potential, the high concentration of heavy metals, arsenic, and salt tends to restrict high-scale implementation before treatment.

Places such as Mexico, Barbados and Puerto Rico have proposed Sargassum management plans, including early-warning systems (e.g., USF Optical Oceanography Laboratory, CARICOOS), community surveillance, and scientific prediction Sargassum forecasts. These strategies focus on the transition between responding to the cleanup process and proactive coastal management. Standardized protocols, environmental impact assessments and regional coordination are still required to facilitate sustainable and cost-effective mitigation measures across the tropical Atlantic basin despite all these advances.

=== Human effects ===
Human activities such as deforestation, release of wastewater, and the widespread application of agricultural fertilizers enhance the enrichment of coastal waters and oceanic waters with nitrogen and phosphorus. It is believed that increased nutrient levels on the equatorial Atlantic, brought by the recurring Sargassum inundation events that started in 2011, contribute to its growth, which is associated with eutrophication in aquatic systems. These events will continue to occur or even increase in the years to come unless global nutrient management and/or coastal runoff controls are employed.

Health impacts of coastal sargassum inundation

Seasonal accumulations of pelagic Sargassum along coastlines have been associated with a range of public health concerns, particularly in the Caribbean, West Africa, and parts of Latin America.

When stranded on beaches, decomposing Sargassum releases gases such as hydrogen sulfide (H₂S) and ammonia, which may pose risks to human health.

Exposure to hydrogen sulfide has been associated with respiratory symptoms such as coughing and shortness of breath, as well as neurological symptoms including headaches, dizziness, and nausea.

Direct contact with decomposing Sargassum may also cause skin irritation in some individuals.

Large-scale Sargassum influxes have also been linked to psychosocial impacts in coastal communities, including stress and reduced quality of life due to persistent odor and disruption of livelihoods.

From a One Health perspective, these impacts highlight the interconnected relationship between environmental change, ecosystem health, and human well-being.

=== Sustainable uses ===
Even though Sargassum influxes have already generated significant environmental and economic issues, researchers and industries are considering methods of converting this biomass to sustainable resources. Sargassum is a rich source of carbohydrates, minerals, and bioactive compounds and it has been used as compost or organic fertilizer in the coastal communities, to reduce waste and increase soil productivity.

More recent research has also investigated the applications of Sargassum in bioremediation and carbon sequestration because it has a high carbon/nitrogen ratio and therefore could be used to take away contaminants and sequester atmospheric CO2. Nonetheless, the presence of high salt and heavy metals in certain Sargassum biomass requires thorough processing prior to agricultural or industrial use.

Recent work has also examined Sargassum as a biosorbent for recovering rare earth elements (REEs). A 2025 study found that Sargassum filipendula efficiently adsorbs REEs across low to high concentrations, with fresh biomass performing especially well at environmentally relevant levels. The species showed high capacities for heavy REEs, maintained effectiveness under high salinity and variable pH, and outperformed activated carbon. This suggests a scalable “algal mining” pathway that could help manage coastal Sargassum while supporting sustainable supplies of critical materials.

=== As food and medicine ===
Japanese cuisine as well as Chile have traditionally consumed Sargassum, known as hijiki, although it contains high amounts of arsenic, part of the arsenic cycle from groundwater, waterways, into oceans and back to land. There are methods to process and greatly reduce arsenic from this genus of seaweed, potentially making it a nearly inexhaustible food supply for animals or people.

Sargassum species are cultivated and cleaned for use as an herbal remedy. Many Chinese herbalists prescribe powdered Sargassum—either the species S. pallidum, or more rarely, hijiki, S. fusiforme—in doses of 0.5 grams dissolved in warm water and drunk as a tea. It is called 海藻; hǎizǎo in traditional Chinese medicine, where it is used to resolve "heat phlegm".

Sargassum (F. Sargassaceae) is an important seaweed excessively distributed in tropical and subtropical regions. Different species of Sargassum have folk applications in human nutrition and are considered a rich source of vitamins, carotenoids, proteins, and minerals. Many bioactive chemical compounds that are classified as terpenoids, sterols, sulfated polysaccharides, polyphenols, sargaquinoic acids, sargachromanol, and pheophytin were isolated from different Sargassum species. These isolated compounds and/or extracts exhibit diverse biological activities, including analgesic, anti-inflammatory, antioxidant, neuroprotective, anti-microbial, anti-tumor, fibrinolytic, immune-modulatory, anticoagulant, hepatoprotective, and anti-viral activities.

=== Biofuel and energy production ===
Researchers have increasingly explored converting Sargassum biomass into biofuel as a sustainable alternative to fossil fuels. In November 2024, researchers at the University of the West Indies in Barbados successfully powered a car using biogas derived from Sargassum, rum distillery wastewater, and sheep dung, offering a potential solution to the region's invasive seaweed crisis by converting the algae into biofuel. Mexican initiatives are turning Sargassum into "Sargapanel" construction materials (fire-retardant, flexible, and recyclable) and biogas (500 tons yielding 20,000 cubic meters, enough to fuel an average gas station daily). The state of Quintana Roo is developing a Circular Economy Center to scale production and sell carbon credits from Sargassum processing.
