= List of British Isles rockpool life =

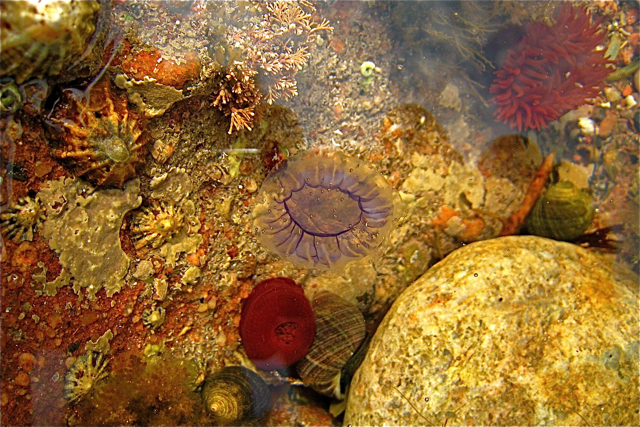
Beadlet anemones, whelks, limpets, jellyfish and Corallina in a rock pool on the rocky shore at Aberdour Bay

The rockpools of the British Isles are a feature of rocky shores and have a particular life of their own. Conditions within them are different from the open sea, as they are exposed to increased sunlight, as well as predation from land-based animals and accidental damage from tourism. Some, such as those in Wembury Marine Centre, are formally protected.

== Animals ==
=== Fish ===
- Common goby, Pomatoschistus microps
- Giant goby, Gobius cobitis Not Ireland
- Painted goby, Pomatoschistus pictus
- Rock goby, Gobius paganellus
- Sand goby, Pomatoschistus minutus
- Two-spotted goby, Gobiusculus flavescens
- Shanny, Lipophrys pholis
- Longspined bullhead, Taurulus bubalis
- Fivebeard rockling, Ciliata mustela
- Butterfish, Pholis gunnellus
- Snake pipefish, Entelurus aequoreus
- Tompot blenny, Parablennius gattorugine
- Montagu's blenny, Coryphoblennius galerita
- Small-headed clingfish, Apletodon dentatus Not Ireland
- Two-spotted clingfish, Diplecogaster bimaculata
- Corkwing wrasse, Crenilabrus melops
- Greater pipefish, Syngnathus acus
- Sea stickleback, Spinachia
- Lumpsucker, Cyclopterus
- Lesser weever, Echiichthys vipera
- Common dragonet, Callionymus lyra

=== Molluscs ===
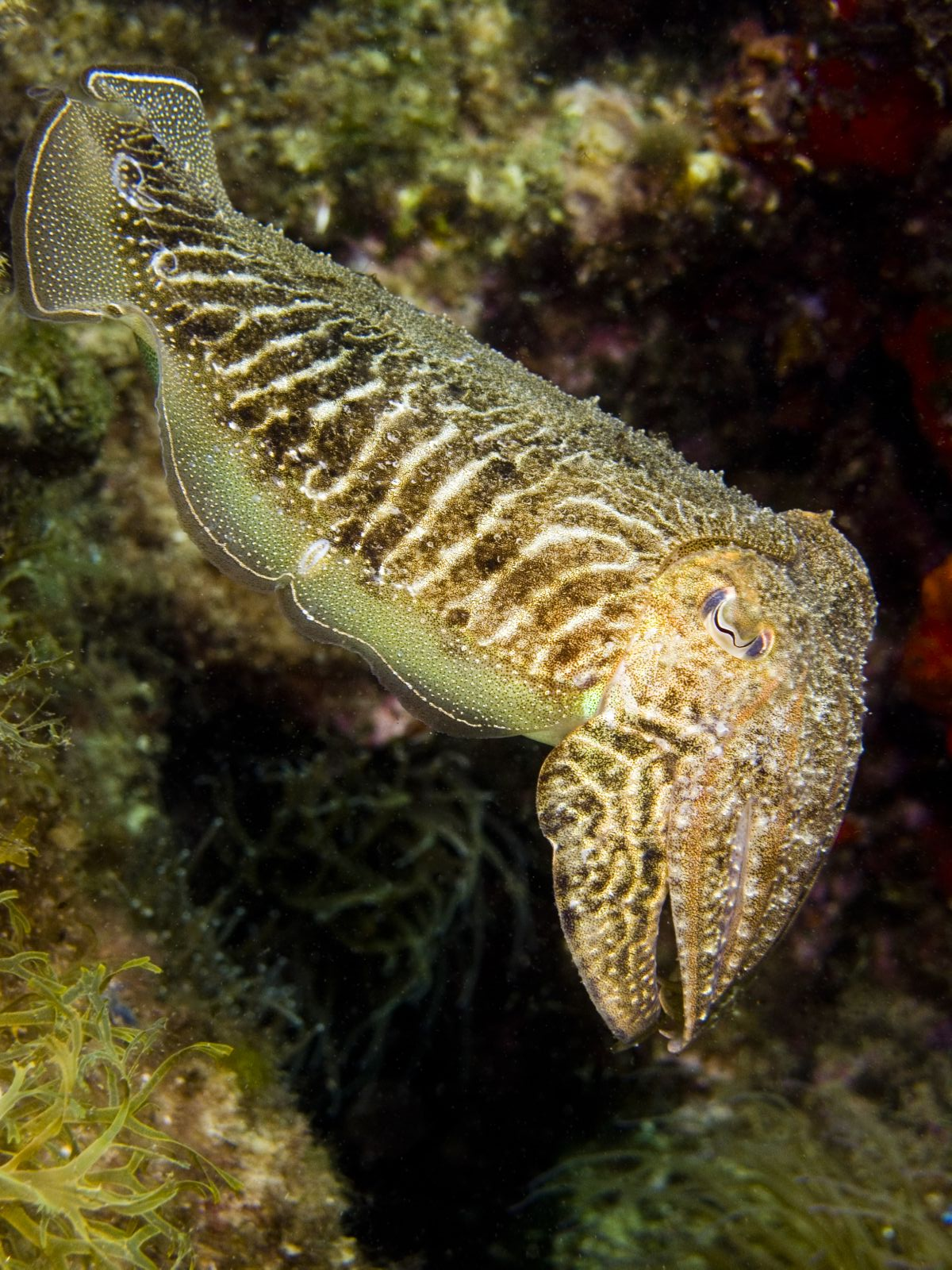
Sepia officinalis, the common cuttlefish

Cephalopods

- Common cuttlefish, Sepia officinalis
- Curled octopus, Eledone cirrhosa
- Common octopus, Octopus vulgaris
- Little cuttle, Sepiola atlantica

Scaphopods

- Tusk shell, Antalis entalis

Gastropods

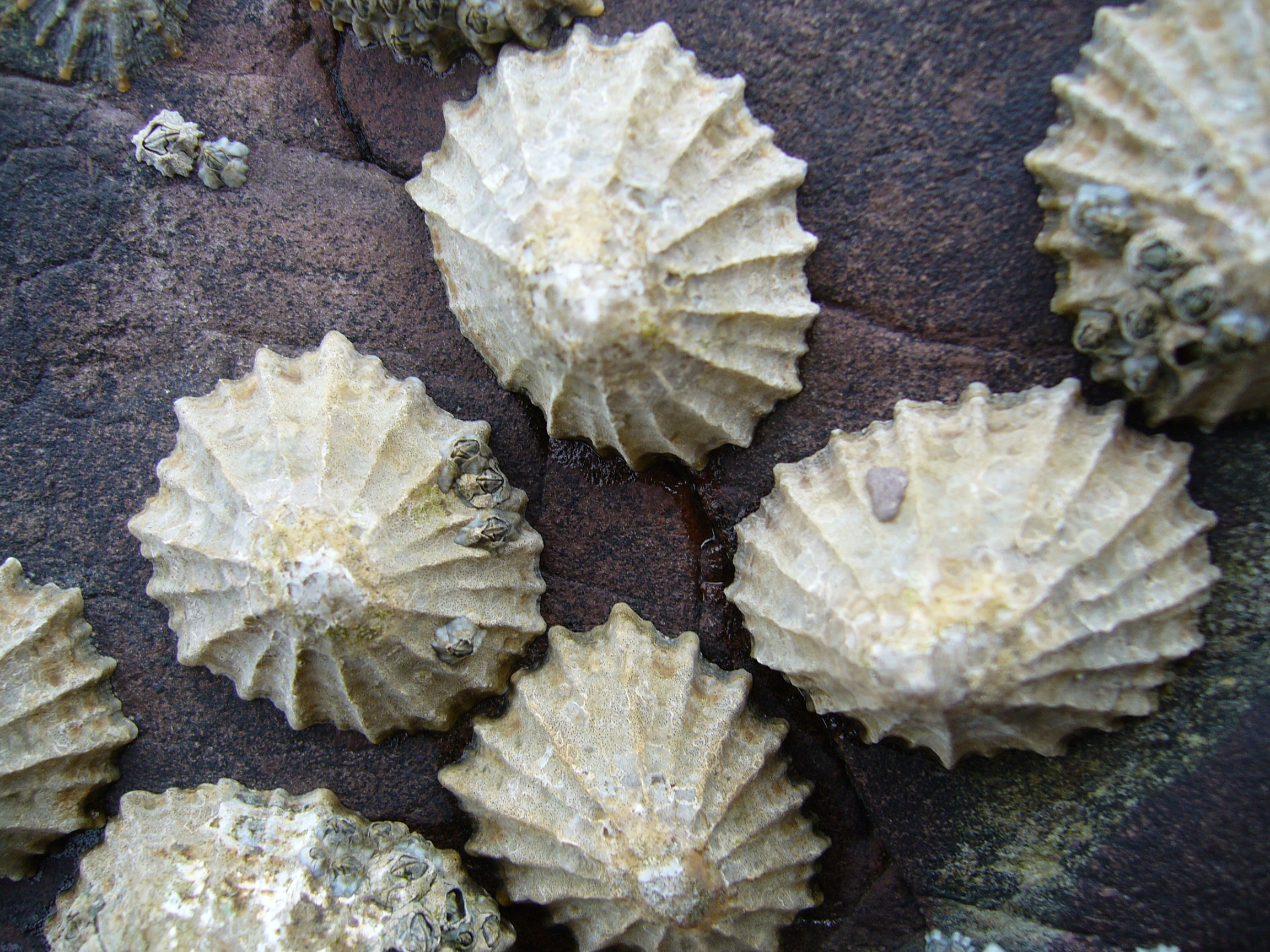
Patella vulgata, the common limpet

- Keyhole limpet, Diodora apertura
- Slit limpet, Emarginula reticulata
- Tortoiseshell limpet, Testudinalia testudinalis
- Common limpet, Patella vulgata
- Flat topshell, Steromphala umbilicalis
- Thick topshell, Monodonta lineata
- Common topshell, Calliostoma zizyphynum
- Common periwinkle, Littorina littorea
- Flat periwinkle, Littorina littoralis
- Rough periwinkle, Littorina saxatilis
- Dog whelk, Nucella lapillus
- Netted Dogwhelk Tritia reticulata
- Common sea slug, Aeolidia papillosa
- Jorunna nudibranch Jorunna tomentosa
- Orange-clubbed nudibranch Limacia clavigera
- Rough-mantled doris Onchidoris bilamellata
- Whip fan nudibranch Duvaucelia odhneri
- Necklace moon snail, Euspira catena

Bivalves

- Blue mussel, Mytilus edulis
- Common cockle, Cerastoderma edule
- Rough cockle, Acanthocardia tuberculata
- Prickly cockle, Acanthocardia echinata
- Bean clam, Donax semistriatus
- Golden banded wedge bean clam, Donax vittatus
- Razor shell, Pharus legumen
- Pod razorshell, Ensis ensis
- Pod razor, Ensis siliqua
- Thin tellin clam, 'Angulus tenuis'
- Baltic tellin clam, Limecola balthica
- Ocean quahog, Arctica islandica
- Venus clam, Dosinia lupinus
- Venus clam, Chamelea striatula
- Striped venus clam, Chamelea gallina
- Smooth clam, Callista chione
- Pullet carpet clam, Venerupis corrugata
- Rayed trough shell, Mactra stultorum
- Cut trough clam, Spisula subtruncata
- Surf clam, Spisula solida
- Otter clam, Lutraria lutraria
- Otter clam, Lutraria angustior
- Piddock, Pholas dactylus
- European flat oyster, Ostrea edulis
- Flat oyster, Ostrea lamellosa
- Great scallop, Pecten maximus
- Queen scallop, Aequipecten opercularis
- Scallop, Aequipecten heliacus

=== Arthropods ===
==== Crustaceans ====
Tigriopus brevicornis, tidepool copepods in their habitat

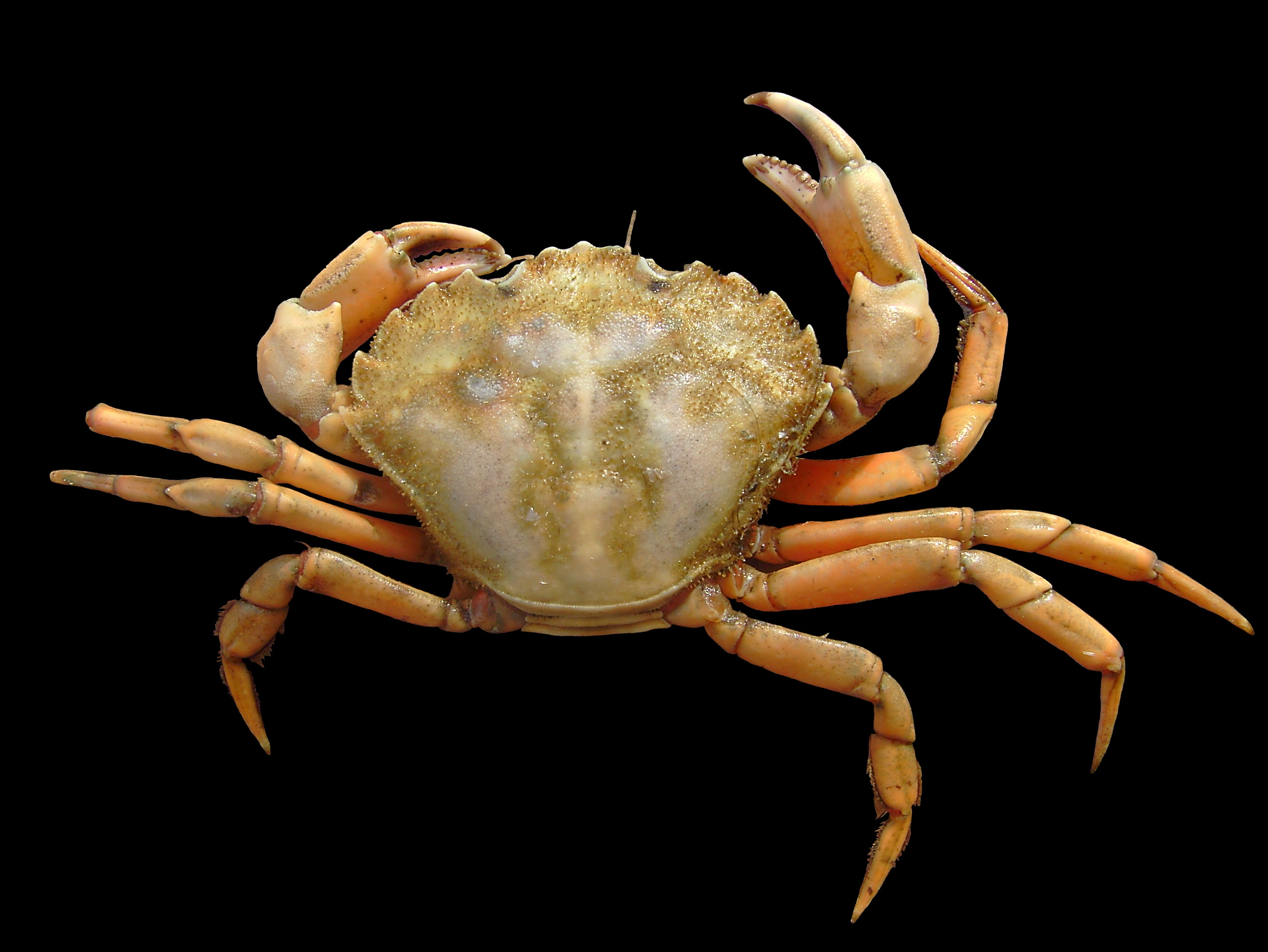
Carcinus maenas, the shore crab

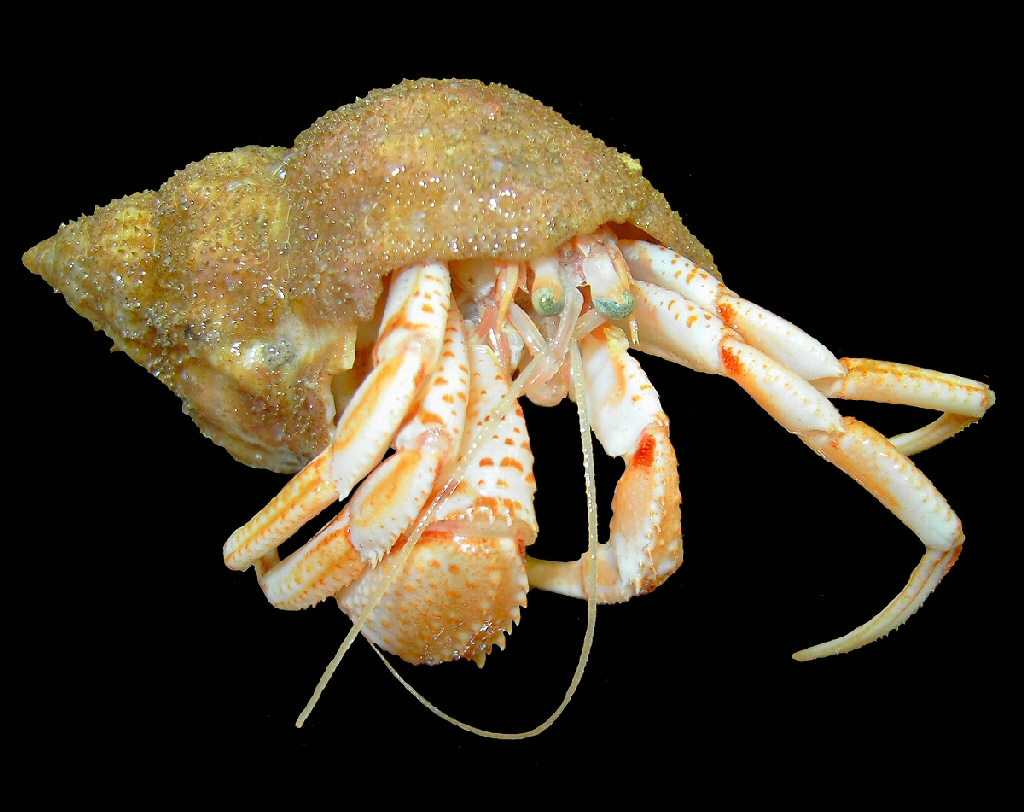
Pagurus bernhardus, the common hermit crab

- Sea slater, Ligia oceanica

Barnacles

- Acorn barnacle, Semibalanus balanoides

Copepods

- Tidepool copepod, Tigriopus brevicornis

Crabs

- Broad-clawed porcelain crab, Porcellana platycheles
- Edible crab, Cancer pagurus
- Shore crab, Carcinus maenas
- Common hermit crab, Pagurus bernhardus
- European spider crab, Maja squinado
- Small hermit crab, Diogenes pugilator
- Velvet crab, Necora puber
- Hairy crab, Pilumnus hirtellus
- Circular crab, Atelecyclus rotundatus
- Sandy swimming crab, Polybius depurator
- Masked crab, Corystes cassivelaunus
- Short-legged spider crab, Eurynome aspera
- Furrowed crab, Xantho hydrophilus
- Long-legged spider crab, Macropodia rostrata
- Great spider crab, Hyas araneus
- Long-clawed porcelain crab, Pisidia longicornis

Prawns and shrimp

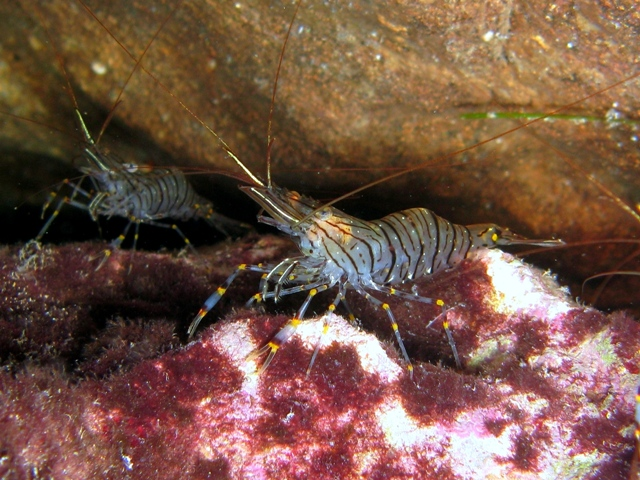
Palaemon serratus

- Common prawn, Palaemon serratus
- Rockpool prawn, Palaemon elegans
- Brown shrimp, Crangon crangon

Lobsters and squat lobsters

- Black squat lobster, Galathea squamifera
- European lobster, Homarus gammarus
- Scampi, Nephrops norvegicus

==== Insects ====
- Springtail, Anurida maritima

=== Cnidarians ===
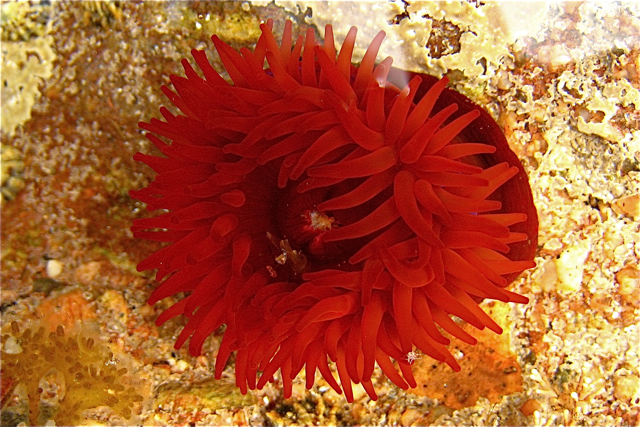
Actinia equina, the beadlet anemone

Sea anemones

- Beadlet anemone, Actinia equina
- Strawberry anemone Actinia fragacea
- Snakelocks anemone Anemonia sulcata
- Dahlia anemone Urticina felina
- Elegant anemone Sagartia elegans

Jellyfish

- Common jellyfish, Aurelia aurita
- Compass jellyfish, Chrysaora hysoscella
- Lion's mane jellyfish, Cyanea capillata
- Dustbin-lid jellyfish, Rhizostoma pulmo
- Jellyfish, Rhizostoma octopus
- Blue jellyfish, Cyanea lamarckii
- Mauve stinger, Pelagia noctiluca

Hydrozoa

- Sea fur, Obelia
- Sea hedgehog hydroid, Halecium muricatum
- Clava
- Oaten pipes hydroid, Tubularia indivisa

=== Echinoderms ===
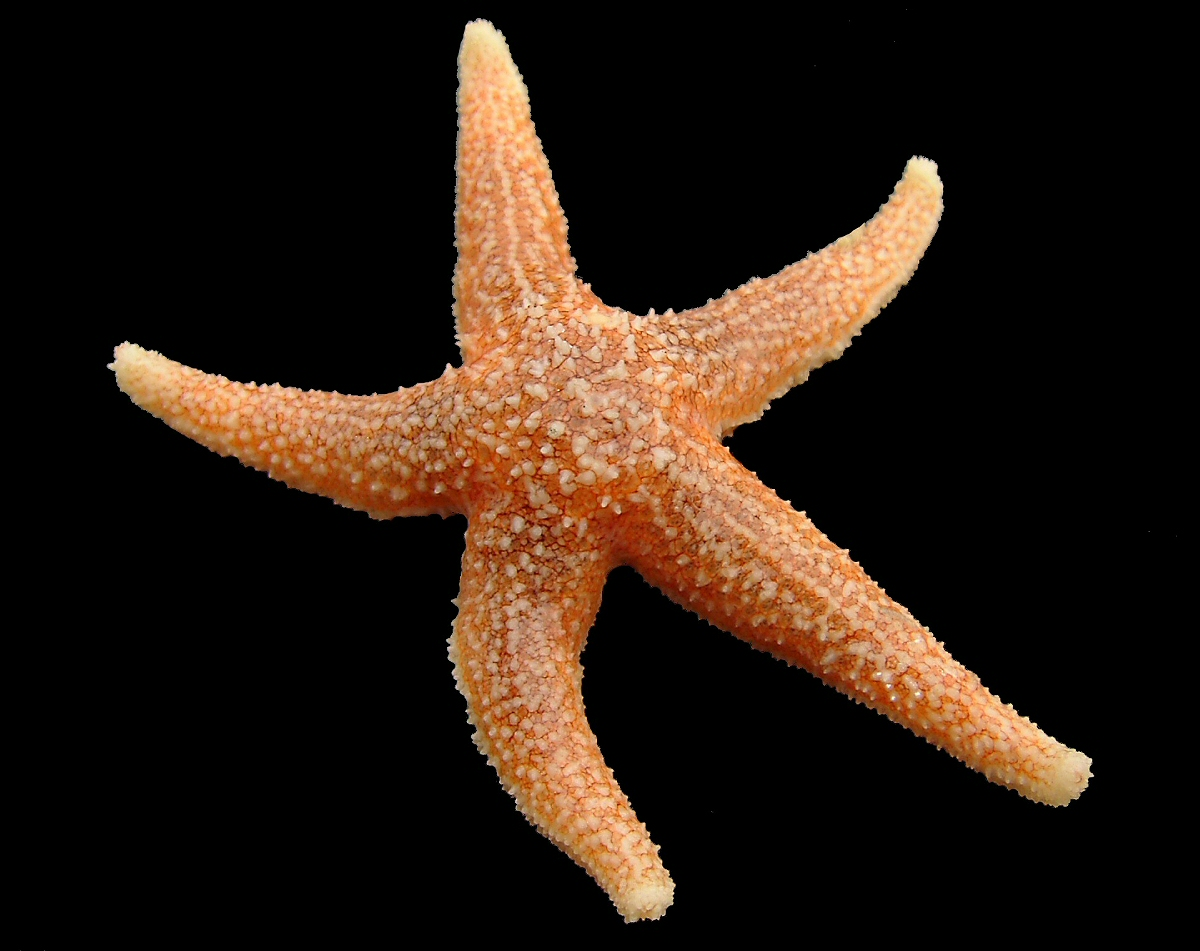
Asterias rubens, the common starfish

Starfish

- Common starfish, Asterias rubens
- Cushion starfish, Asterina gibbosa
- Spiny starfish, Marthasterias glacialis
- Common brittle star, Ophiothrix fragilis
- Serpent star, Ophiura ophiura

Sea urchins

- Edible sea urchin, Echinus esculentus
- Purple sea urchin, Paracentrotus lividus
- Green sea urchin, Psammechinus miliaris
- Purple heart urchin, Spatangus purpureus
- Sea potato, Echinocardium cordatum

=== Worms ===
- Green leaf worm, Eulalia viridis
- Spirorbis spirorbis
- Sea Mouse, Aphrodita aculeata

=== Nemertea ===
- Bootlace worm, Lineus longissimus
- Ragworms, Nereididae
- Bloodworms, Glyceridae

=== Sponges ===
- Breadcrumb sponge, Halichondria panicea
- Purse sponge, Sycon raphanus

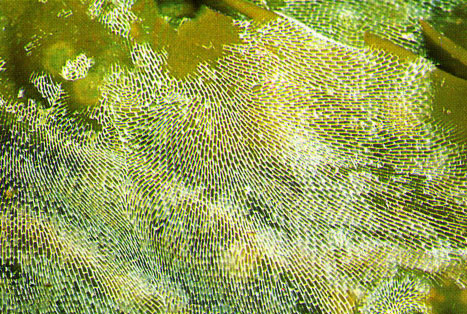
Sea-mat

=== Bryozoa ===
- Moss animal, Flustra foliacea
- Sea-mat, Membranipora membranacea

=== Tunicates ===
- Golden star ascidian, Botryllus schlosseri
- Vase tunicate, Ciona intestinalis

== Plants ==
=== Algae ===
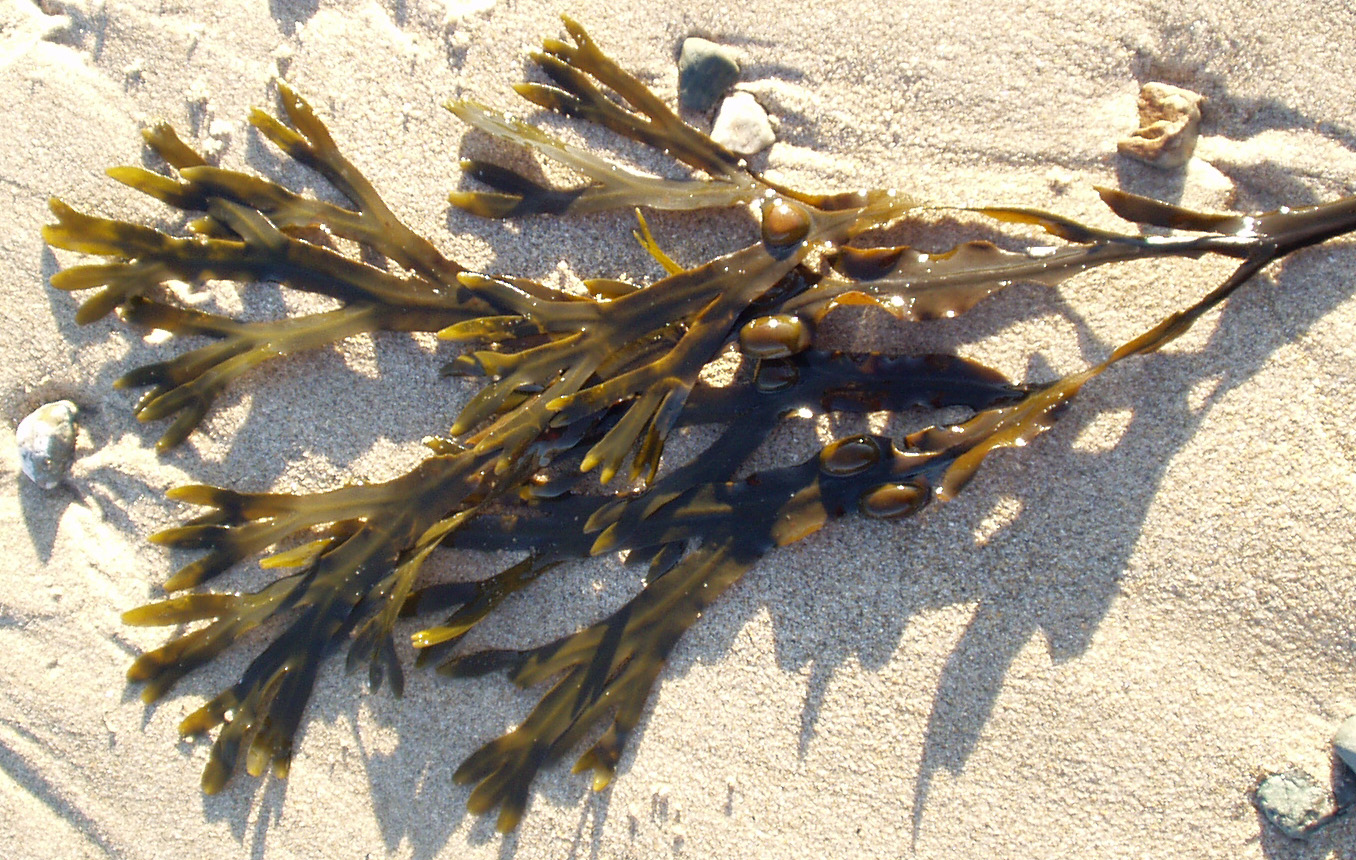
Fucus vesiculosus

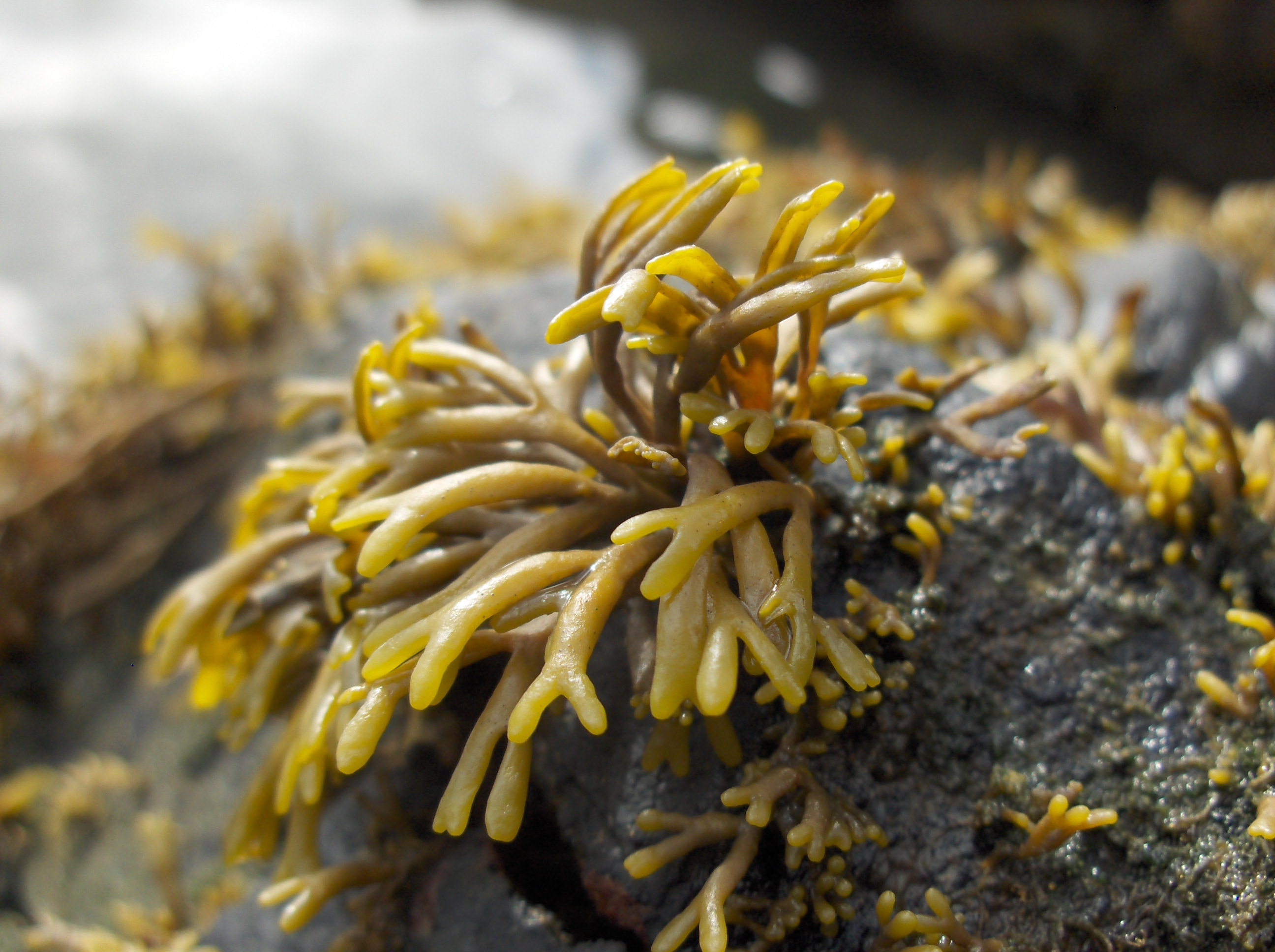
Pelvetia canaliculata

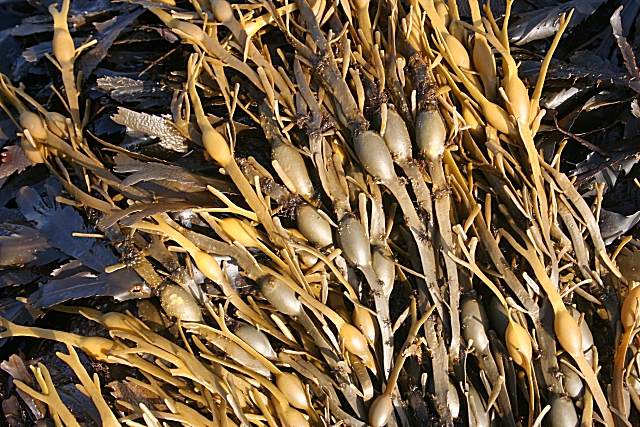
Ascophyllum nodosum

- Beanweed, Scytosiphon lomentaria
- Bootlace weed, Chorda filum
- Dulse, Rhodymenia palmata
- Grass kelp, Enteromorpha intestinalis
- Green hairweed, Chaetomorpha linum
- Maiden's hair, Ectocarpus siliculosus
- Hen pen, Bryopsis plumosa
- Landlady's wig, Ahnfeltia plicata
- Peacock's tail, Padina pavonia
- Sea lettuce, Ulva lactuca
- Rockweed, Fucus distichus
- Sea noodle, Nemalion helminthoides
- Sea oak, Halidrys siliquosa
- Sea sorrel, Desmarestia ligulata
- Thongweed, Himanthalia elongata
- Velvet horn, Codium tomentosum
- Bladder wrack, Fucus vesiculosus
- Channelled wrack, Pelvetia canaliculata
- Knotted wrack, Ascophyllum nodosum
- Spiral wrack, Fucus spiralis
- Rainbow wrack, Cytoseira tamariscifolia
- Brown forking weed, Bifurcaria bifurcata
- Coral weed, Corallina officinalis
- Common green branched weed, Cladophora rupestris
- Sea beech, Delessaria sanguinea
- Sea cauliflower, Leathesia difformis
- Sea cellophane, Monostroma grevillei
- Prasiola stipitata
- Punctaria latifolia
- Oyster thief, Colpomenia peregrina

=== Lichens ===
- Verrucaria morpha
- Verrucaria mucosa

== Related ==
Collections Botaniques de l'Université de Bourgogne Rockpooling: The Guide to Finding Marine Creatures
