= Co-adaptation =

In biology, co-adaptation is the process by which two or more species, genes or phenotypic traits undergo adaptation as a pair or group. This occurs when two or more interacting characteristics undergo natural selection together in response to the same selective pressure or when selective pressures alter one characteristic and consecutively alter the interactive characteristic. These interacting characteristics are only beneficial when together, sometimes leading to increased interdependence. Co-adaptation and coevolution, although similar in process, are not the same; co-adaptation refers to the interactions between two units, whereas co-evolution refers to their evolutionary history. Co-adaptation and its examples are often seen as evidence for co-evolution, combining with other protein interactions.

== Genes and Protein Complexes ==
At genetic level, co-adaptation is the accumulation of interacting genes in the gene pool of a population by selection. Selection pressures on one of the genes will affect its interacting proteins, after which compensatory changes occur.

Proteins often act in complex interactions with other proteins and functionally related proteins often show a similar evolutionary path. A possible explanation is co-adaptation. An example of this is the interaction between proteins encoded by mitochondrial DNA (mtDNA) and nuclear DNA (nDNA). MtDNA has a higher rate of evolution/mutation than nDNA, especially in specific coding regions. However, in order to maintain physiological functionality, selection for functionally interacting proteins, and therefore co-adapted nDNA will be favorable.

Co-adaptation between mtDNA and nDNA sequences has been studied in the copepod Tigriopus californicus. The mtDNA of COII coding sequences among conspecific populations of this species diverges extensively. When mtDNA of one population was placed in a nuclear background of another population, cytochrome c oxidase activity is significantly decreased, suggesting co-adaptation. Results show an unlikely relationship between the variation in mtDNA and environmental factors. A more likely explanation is the neutral evolution of mtDNA with compensatory changes by the nDNA driven by neutral evolution of mtDNA (random mutations over time in isolated populations).

=== Bacteria and bacteriophage ===
Gene blocks in bacterial genomes are sequences of genes, co-located on the chromosome, that are evolutionarily conserved across numerous taxa. Some conserved blocks are operons, where the genes are cotranscribed to polycistronic mRNA, and such operons are often associated with a single function such as a metabolic pathway or a protein complex. The co-location of genes with related function and the preservation of these relationships over evolutionary time indicates that natural selection has been operating to maintain a co-adaptive benefit.

As the early mapping of genes on the bacteriophage T4 chromosome progressed, it became evident that the arrangement of the genes is far from random. Genes with like functions tend to fall into clusters and appear to be co-adapted to each other. For instance genes that specify proteins employed in bacteriophage head morphogenesis are tightly clustered. Other examples of apparently co-adapted clusters are the genes that determine the baseplate wedge, the tail fibers, and DNA polymerase accessory proteins. In other cases where the structural relationship of the gene products is not as evident, a co-adapted clustering based on functional interaction may also occur. Thus Obringer proposed that a specific cluster of genes, centered around the imm and spackle genes encodes proteins adapted for competition and defense at the DNA level.

== Organs ==
Similar to traits on a genetic level, aspects of organs can also be subject to co-adaptation. For example, slender bones can have similar performance in regards to bearing daily loads as thicker bones, due to slender bones having more mineralized tissue. This means that slenderness and the level of mineralization have probably been co-adapted. However, due to being harder than thick bones, slender bones are generally less pliant and more prone to breakage, especially when subjected to more extreme load conditions.

Weakly electric fish are capable of creating a weak electric field using an electric organ. These electric fields can be used to communicate between individuals through electric organ discharges (EOD), which can be further modulated to create context-specific signals called 'chirps'. Fish can sense these electric fields and signals using electroreceptors. Research on ghost knifefish indicates that the signals produced by electric fish and the way they are received might be co-adapted, as the environment in which the fish resides (both physical and social) influences selection for the chirps, EODs, and detection. Interactions between territorial fish favor different signal parameters than interactions within social groups of fish.

== Behaviour ==
=== Parent and offspring ===
The behaviour of parents and their offspring during feeding is influenced by one another. Parents feed depending on how much their offspring begs, while the offspring begs depending on how hungry it is. This would normally lead to a conflict of interest between parent and offspring, as the offspring will want to be fed as much as possible, whereas the parent can only invest a limited amount of energy into parental care. As such, selection would occur for the combination of begging and feeding behaviours that leads to the highest fitness, resulting in co-adaptation. Parent-offspring co-adaptation can be further influenced by information asymmetry, such as female blue tits being exposed more to begging behaviour in nature, resulting in them responding more than males to similar levels of stimuli.

=== Brood parasitism ===
Co-adaptation is a prominent feature of brood parasitism, a specialized form of parent-offspring relationship in which parasitic birds—such as cuckoos, cowbirds, indigobirds, and whydahs—lay their eggs in the nests of host species, leaving the host to raise the parasitic offspring. This relationship has driven a dynamic evolutionary arms race, resulting in a range of sophisticated adaptations and counter-adaptations. Parasitic birds have evolved the ability to mimic the color and shape of host eggs, thereby reducing the likelihood of egg rejection. Some species have further developed "vocal password" systems, wherein the parasitic chicks imitate the calls or begging signals of host offspring to solicit food and care. Hosts, in turn, may evolve heightened discrimination abilities to detect foreign eggs or unusual chick vocalizations. The balance of these adaptations is increasingly disrupted by habitat loss and fragmentation, which can alter host-parasite interactions by changing host community composition and availability, often making it more difficult for hosts to evolve or maintain effective defenses.

== Partial and antagonistic co-adaptation ==
It is also possible for related traits to only partially co-adapt due to traits not developing at the same speed, or contradict each other entirely. Research on Australian skinks revealed that diurnal skinks have a high temperature preference and can sprint optimally at higher temperatures, while nocturnal skinks have a low preferred temperature and optimum temperature. However, the differences between high and low optimal temperatures were much smaller than between preferred temperatures, which means that nocturnal skinks sprint slower compared to their diurnal counterparts. In the case of Eremiascincus, the optimum temperature and preferred temperature diverged from one another in opposite directions, creating antagonistic co-adaptation.

== See also ==
- Evolutionary biology
- Coevolution
- Mutualism
- Symbiosis
- Linkage disequilibrium
- Epistasis
