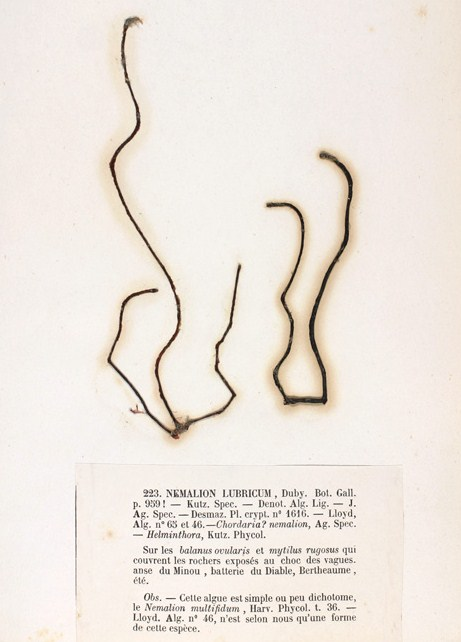
- Nemalion lubricum

Scientific classification
- Clade: Archaeplastida
- Division: Rhodophyta
- Class: Florideophyceae
- Order: Nemaliales
- Family: Nemaliaceae
- Genus: Nemalion; Duby

= Nemalion =

Genus of algae

Nemalion is a genus of red algae that contains approximately ten species, including N. helminthoides. Its members are known by a number of common names. (Note: Recorded common names are threadweed, umisomen, tsukomo nori, crop of threads, sea noodles, tsukomo-nori, umisÔmen and umi-somen.) It is the source of the subclass name "Nemaliophycidae".

== Species ==
As of 2017, the species accepted taxonomically are:

- Nemalion amoenum
- Nemalion attenuatum
- Nemalion cari-cariense
- Nemalion helminthoides
- Nemalion longicolle
- Nemalion lubricum (type species)
- Nemalion multifidum
  - Nemalion multifidum subsp. monoicum
- Nemalion perpusillum
- Nemalion vermiculare

== Description ==
Simple multiaxial frond, with a soft and gelatinous core.

== Habitat ==
Marine, mainly littoral.
