= Tigriopus californicus =

Scientific classification
- Kingdom: Animalia
- Phylum: Arthropoda
- Clade: Pancrustacea
- Class: Copepoda
- Order: Harpacticoida
- Family: Harpacticidae
- Genus: Tigriopus
- Species: T. californicus

Binomial name
- Tigriopus californicus (Baker, 1912)

Synonyms
- Tigriopus triangulus Campbell, 1930; Tisbe californica Baker, 1912

Species of crustacean

Tigriopus californicus is an intertidal copepod species that is native on the Pacific coast of North America. This species has been the subject of numerous scientific studies on subjects ranging from its ecology, evolution, and neurobiology.

== Ecology and environment ==
Found thriving in many areas, from central Baja California, Mexico to Alaska, USA along the Pacific coast of North America, T. californicus inhabits splash pools in rocky intertidal habitat. T. californicus is limited to pools in the upper end of the intertidal apparently by predation, but it can reach quite high population densities in its habitat. One study found that population densities on Vancouver Island averaged about 800 copepods per liter with some dense pools having as many as 20,000 copepods per liter.

These splash pools are often isolated from the moderating influence of the ocean. They vary dramatically in terms of environmental factors such as salinity and temperature over the course of hours or days. T. californicus has the ability to thrive under these variable environmental conditions (factors that limit predators such as fish to lower pools in the intertidal zone). Temperature in the pools tend to track air temperatures more closely than ocean temperatures. Salinities in pools can change as pools evaporate, receive freshwater inputs from rain, or saltwater from wave actions.

The ability of T. californicus to handle extreme high temperatures varies among populations within southern California. It is observed that the Southern California populations are able to handle higher temperatures than those living further north. This pattern of higher thermal tolerance in southern populations mirrors the temperature variation seen in copepod pools of southern populations experiencing more extreme high temperatures (over 40 °C or 104 °F on occasion). The genetic basis of this potential thermal adaptation has been studied by looking at genome-wide studies of gene expression and this study showed that differential expression of Hsp70 genes and a number of other genes could contribute to differences in thermal tolerance between these populations.

They have been known to survive up to six months in laboratory conditions, however their longevity in natural conditions has yet to be determined.

== Genetics and evolution ==
Populations of T. californicus along the Pacific coast of North America show a striking pattern of genetic differentiation among populations. Mitochondrial DNA shows particularly large divergences among populations often exceeding twenty percent total sequence divergence. Genetic divergence of a smaller magnitude extends down to a more local scale and this divergence can be stable for longer than two decades for outcrops that are as little as 500 m (0.31 mi) apart, suggesting that dispersal between outcrops must be relatively rare for this copepod. Surprisingly, genetic divergence is much lower among copepod populations from Washington north to Alaska suggesting that copepods may have recolonized these areas since the end of the last ice age. Crosses of copepods from different populations of T. californicus have been used to study how reproductive isolation accumulates between diverging population to gain insights into the process of speciation. For crosses between many populations a pattern that has been called hybrid breakdown is observed; this means that first generation hybrids have high survival and reproduction (fitness), while the second generation hybrids have lower and more variable fitness. Deleterious interactions between the mitochondrial genome and nuclear genome may play a large role in the reduction in hybrid fitness observed in many of these crosses. Sex determination in T. californicus does not appear to be caused by sex chromosomes and is likely to be polygenic, potentially influenced by environmental conditions. The ratios of males to females produced by females differs among families and in some families seems to be genetically determined largely by the father in a pair. Another interesting feature of the mating system of this species is that the males use their large clasping antennules to clutch females until they are ready to mate. Females will mate only once during their lives but produce multiple clutches of offspring.

== Physiology ==
This copepod species has also been used as a model system in which to look at some questions in animal physiology including both neurobiology and osmoregulation. In response to increasing or decreasing environmental salinities T. californicus changes the amount of amino acids within its cells to maintain water balance. The amino acid proline is subject to strict regulation in response to changes in salinity and this may be a common mechanism of osmoregulation across crustaceans. For neurobiology, one study looked at the central nervous system of this copepod to get an idea of the organization of the central nervous system of the ancestors to the crustaceans and insects to complement the neurobiological work that has been done in a group of distantly related copepods (the calanoid copepods).
