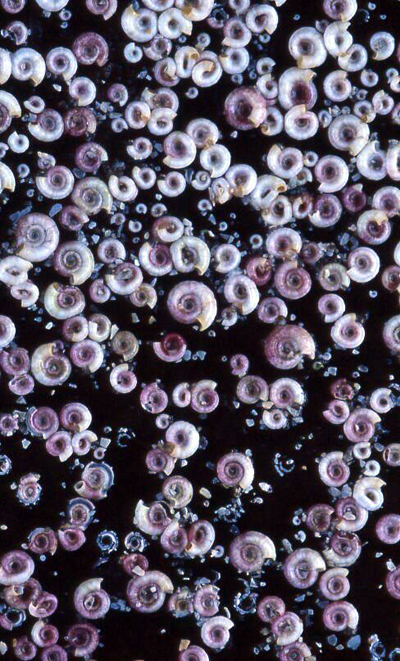
- Spirorbis spirorbis (modern)

Scientific classification
- Kingdom: Animalia
- Phylum: Annelida
- Clade: Pleistoannelida
- Clade: Sedentaria
- Order: Sabellida
- Family: Serpulidae
- Genus: Spirorbis; Daudin, 1800

Species
- see text

= Spirorbis =

Spirorbis Temporal range: Miocene–Recent

Genus of annelid worms

Spirorbis is a genus of very small (2–5 mm (0.079–0.197 in)) polychaete worms, usually with a white coiled shell. Members of the genus live in the lower littoral and sublittoral zones of rocky shores. Spirorbis worms usually live attached to seaweeds, but some species live directly on rocks, shells or other hard substrates. Spirorbis was once thought to have a fossil record extending back into the Early Paleozoic, but now all pre-Bathonian (Middle Jurassic) spirorbins are known to be microconchids. The earliest members of genus appeared in the Miocene, but Oligocene finds may also be possible. The genus contains the following species:

- Spirorbis corallinae De Silva and Knight-jones, 1962
- Spirorbis cuneatus Gee, 1964
- Spirorbis granulatus
- Spirorbis incongruus
- Spirorbis inornatus L'hardy and Quievreux, 1962
- Spirorbis knightjonesi Desilva, 1965
- Spirorbis lineatus
- Spirorbis marioni (Caullery and Mesnil, 1897)
- Spirorbis medius
- Spirorbis moerchi
- Spirorbis nakamurai
- Spirorbis quadrangularis
- Spirorbis quasimilitaris Bailey, 1970
- Spirorbis rupestris Gee and Knight-jones, 1962
- Spirorbis semidentatus
- Spirorbis similis
- Spirorbis spirorbis (Linnaeus, 1758)
- Spirorbis steueri Sterzinger, 1909
- Spirorbis tridentata Levinsen, 1883
- Spirorbis variabilis
- Spirorbis violaceus
