= Spirorbis corallinae =

Scientific classification
- Domain: Eukaryota
- Kingdom: Animalia
- Phylum: Annelida
- Clade: Pleistoannelida
- Clade: Sedentaria
- Order: Sabellida
- Family: Serpulidae
- Genus: Spirorbis
- Species: S. corallinae

Binomial name
- Spirorbis corallinae De Silva and Knight-Jones, 1962

Species of worm

Spirorbis corallinae is a very small (1-2 mm) coiled polychaete (bristle worm) that lives attached to seaweed in shallow saltwater.

It has a smooth, white or semi-translucent, sinistral (left-handed) coiled shell encasing an orange body about 1.5 mm in length.

The worm has a short abdominal region and a slightly broader thorax terminating in colourless tentacles, used to filter food from the water. One of the tentacles is slightly larger than the rest and shaped like a saucer, which is used as an operculum. This seals the opening of the shell and serves to protect the worm from predators and desiccation when out of water.

It lives primarily on the red algae Corallina officinalis, after which it takes its name, but is also known to live on Irish Moss (Chondrus crispus). The shell is often confused with the white growing tips of Corallina fronds.

The Spirorbis genus are cross fertilising hermaphrodites, who brood their young in a tube attached to the worm inside the shell. The larvae are released at an advanced stage of development and spend just a few hours as free-living organisms before attaching themselves to the nearest suitable surface, often the same seaweed as the parent.

== Distribution ==
Ireland, north and west coasts of Britain; also the coast from North Norway to North France.
