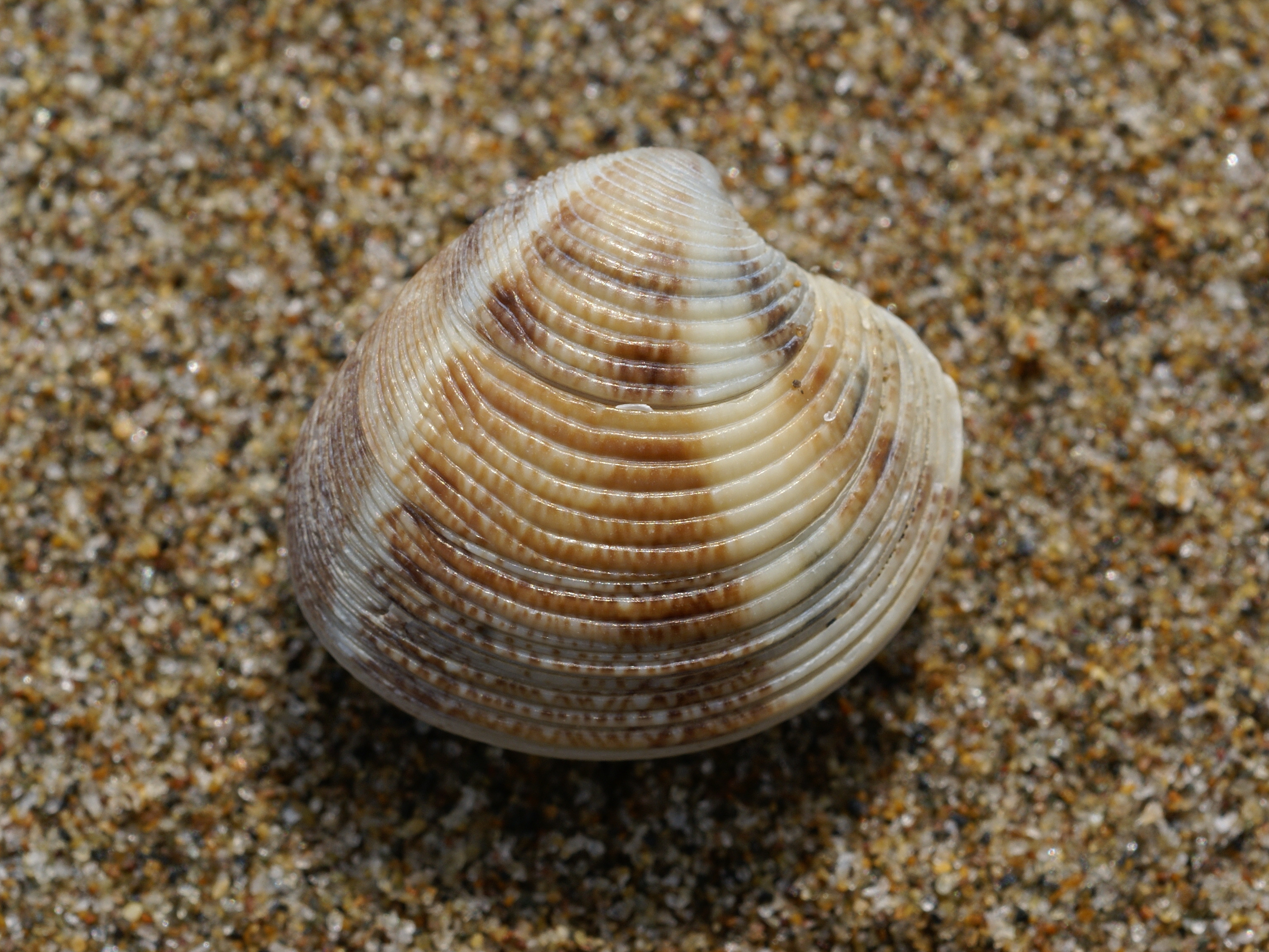
- Chamelea gallina

Scientific classification
- Kingdom: Animalia
- Phylum: Mollusca
- Class: Bivalvia
- Order: Venerida
- Superfamily: Veneroidea
- Family: Veneridae
- Genus: Chamelea; Mörch, 1853

Species
- See text.

= Chamelea =

Genus of bivalves

Chamelea is a genus of small saltwater clams, marine bivalve molluscs in the family Veneridae, the venus clams.

== Species ==
Species within the genus Chamelea include:

- Chamelea gallina
- Chamelea striatula
