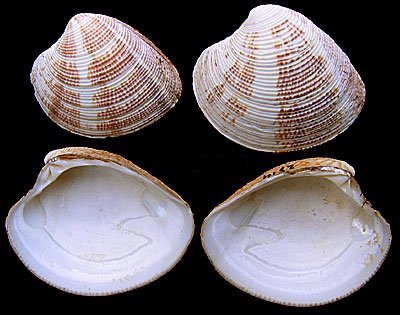
- Left and right valve of Chamelea striatula, inside and outside view

Scientific classification
- Kingdom: Animalia
- Phylum: Mollusca
- Class: Bivalvia
- Order: Venerida
- Family: Veneridae
- Genus: Chamelea
- Species: C. striatula

Binomial name
- Chamelea striatula (da Costa, 1778)

= Chamelea striatula =

Species of mollusc

Chamelea striatula, the striped venus clam, is a marine bivalve mollusc of the family Veneridae which inhabits the northern shores of Europe.

== Description ==
The valves of Chamelea striatula are robust and not very convex, with a beak which is prominently bent towards the shell's anterior and sits behind a clearly delimited lunula. The valves appear nearly triangular: The beak sits anterior to the center of the valve, and the dorsal margin behind it runs with a very slight curve all the way down to the lower margin of the shell, giving the posterior end a point. They commonly grow to about 3 cm in size. The ligament is inset, and both valves' hinges have three cardinal teeth but no lateral teeth. The pallial sinus is triangular and very small.

The interior lower margin is finely crenelated and the outside of the shell is marked by many regular concentric ridges.

Well preserved or live specimens typically have a pattern of darker rays or zigzags on a lighter background, and are cream coloured or brown with a lighter inside.

Right and left valve of the same specimen:

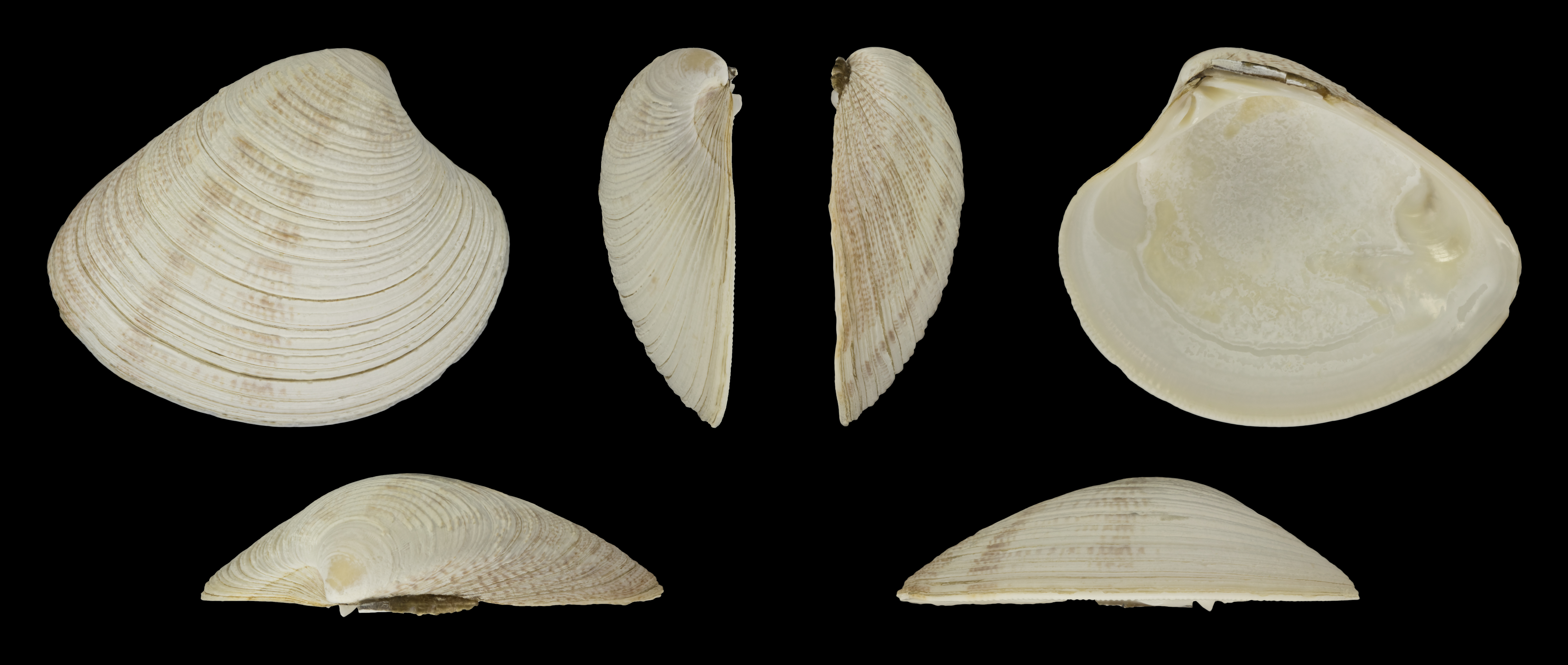
Right valve

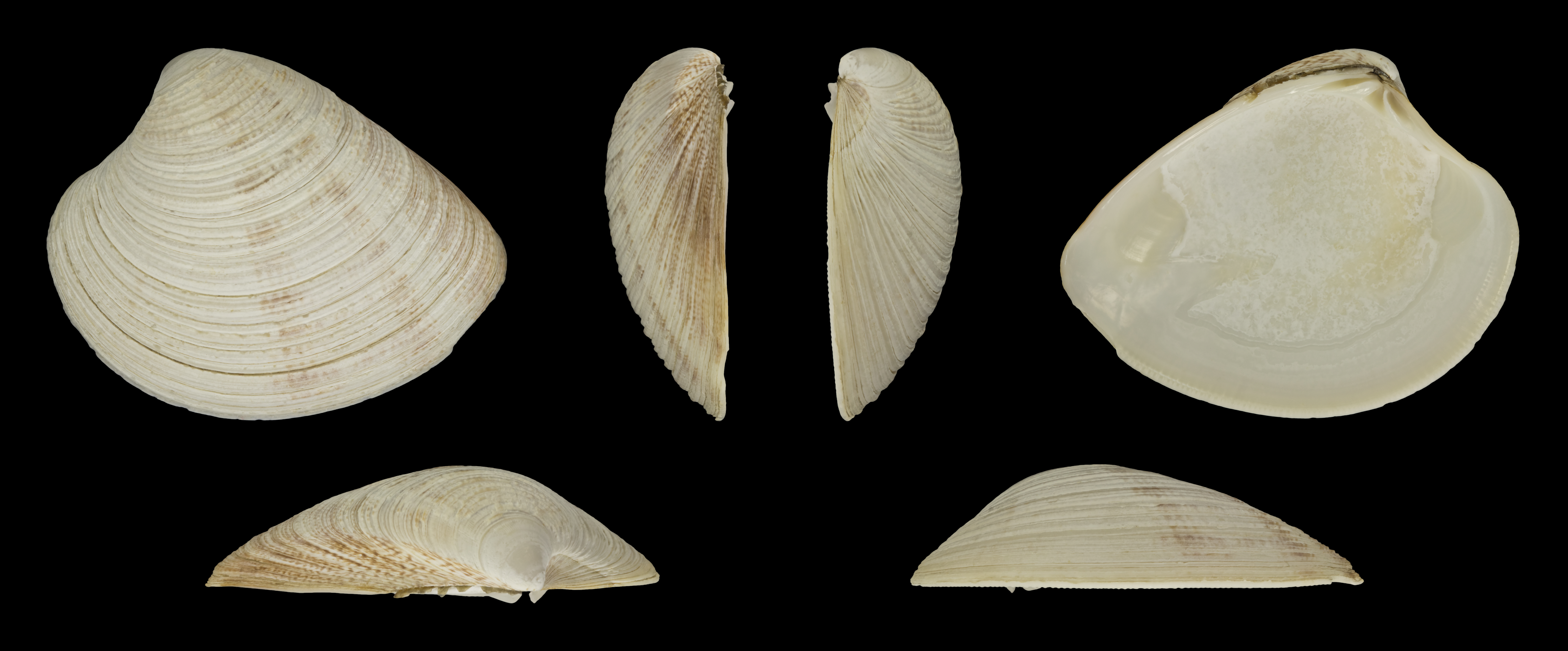
Left valve

== Distribution ==
The bivalve can be found from Norway to Morocco, and is known also from Madeira and the Canary Islands. Its range extends into the Mediterranean, where it coexists with the slightly larger common venus clam (Chamelea gallina). The two live sympatrically on the coast of Algarve, in the Gulf of Cádiz, the Strait of Gibraltar, and the Alboran Sea.

Fossil valves are common in the North Sea, where they are likely not older than the Holocene or Pleistocene.

== Taxonomy ==
There are two living species in the genus Chamelea, C. striatula and C. gallina, whose independence from each other was supported by genetic evidence in 1994 and 2017. Generally, C. gallina is thought of as a Mediterranean and C. striatula as an Atlantic species

In the 10th edition of Systema Naturae, Linné named Venus gallina based on the Mediterranean species, not accounting for the presence of an extremely similar venus clam on the northern coasts of Europe. Many authors quickly coined names for this overlooked species and its many slight morphological varieties, most notably Da Costa's Pectunculus striatulus (1778), which today is the basis of record for Chamelea striatula. Other notable obsolete names include Pennant's rugosa (1777), technically the first one to be coined, and Montagu's laminosa (1808), which describes a deep water variety with almost lamellose ridges

As was convention at the time, British conchologists paid attention practically exclusively to the animals' shells, and rarely to the animal itself. Only in 1853 did Forbes and Hanley describe the most reliable way to distinguish striatula from gallina: the former's siphonal tubes are fully joined, while the latter's are separate and much shorter. The characteristic traits of the Atlantic and the Mediterranean form were often understood to form a continuum, which made their separation a matter of opinion
