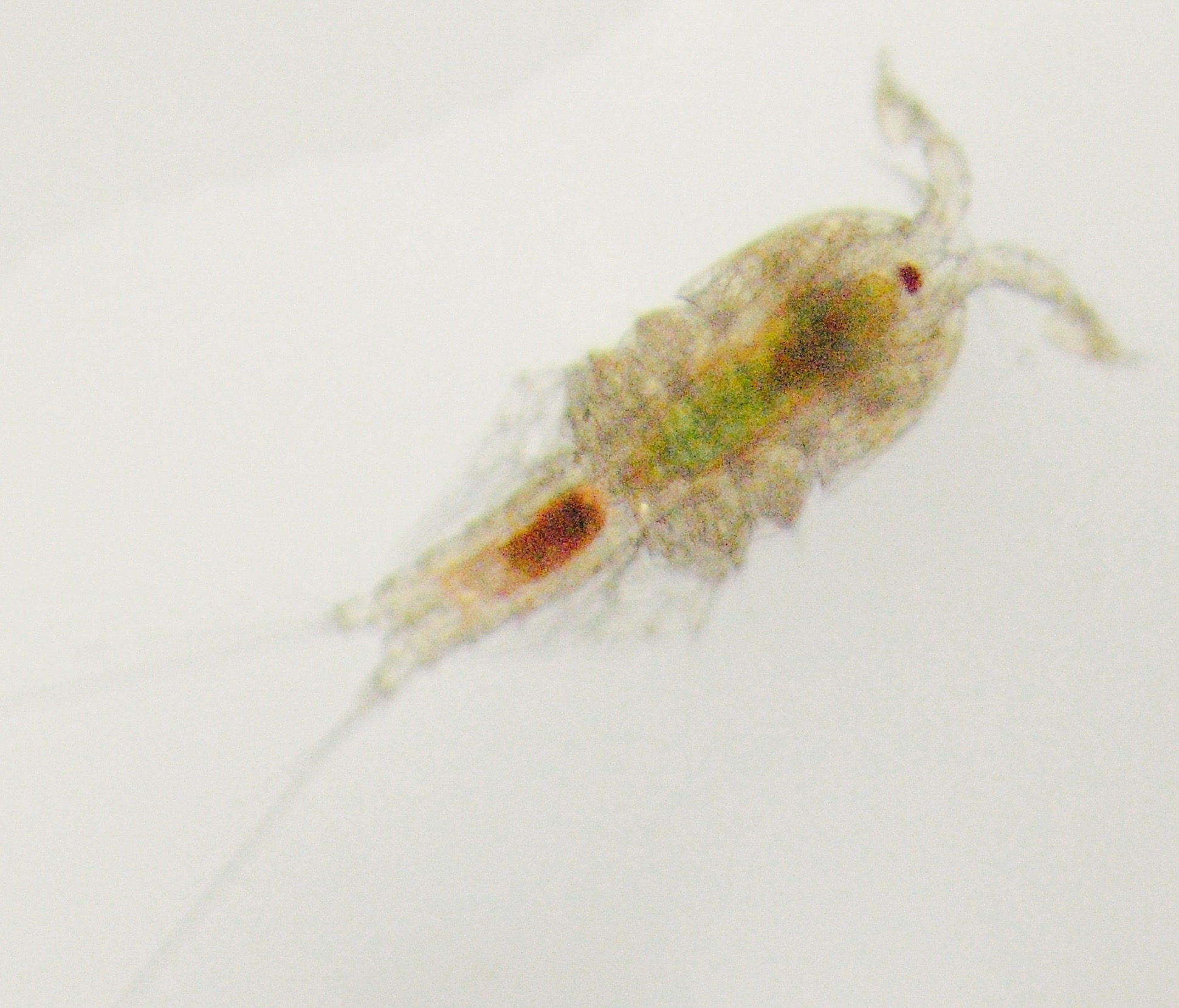
- Microscope image of a living male Atlantic copepod T. brevicornis. It has a single naupliar eye and a green intestinal region from its main diet of micro algae.

Scientific classification
- Kingdom: Animalia
- Phylum: Arthropoda
- Clade: Pancrustacea
- Class: Copepoda
- Order: Harpacticoida
- Family: Harpacticidae
- Genus: Tigriopus
- Species: T. brevicornis

Binomial name
- Tigriopus brevicornis (Müller O.F., 1776)

Synonyms
- Cyclops brevicornis Müller O.F., 1776

= Tigriopus brevicornis =

Coastal marine copepod from north western Europe

Tigriopus brevicornis is a coastal marine copepod. They are a dominant member of shallow supra tidal rock pools along the North Western European coastline. A broad range of studies have been carried out on this species, including: its ecology, physiology, phylogeography, metapopulation genetics, development and reproductive behaviour. T. brevicornis has also recently been used in ecotoxicology studies and has been trialled as a live feed for larvae in several aquaculture-based studies for the past 30 years.

== Environment and ecology ==
This species of harpacticoid copepod is found in high shore splash pools on coastlines ranging from Portugal in the south to Iceland and Nova Scotia in the north. Sometimes it can be found below the high tide mark however, like in Sweden, where it was found at depths of 10 metres in the subtidal. These splash pools occur several metres above the high tide mark, isolated from the main coastal water as a microenvironment that can vary dramatically in chemical factors such as salinity, temperature and oxygen levels over relatively short temporal scales. T. brevicornis has the ability to survive these variable environmental conditions (factors that limit predators such as fish to lower pools in the intertidal zone) and as a result is known as a euryhaline osmoconformer. Temperatures in supratidal splash pools tend to track air temperatures more closely than ocean temperatures as they are often extremely shallow (only a few cm deep to a few meters deep). Salinity also changes as the pools evaporate or fill up (from 0-150 PSU) as the pools receive freshwater inputs from rain (especially so in the West of Ireland) and saltwater from wave action during spring tides or storm surges. The orange pigment Astaxanthin is synthesised by the organism as an aid against UVAR and UVBR radiation from the sun, as rock pools can be quite exposed to desiccation. The copepod's diet of phytoplankton who are rich in Highly Unsaturated Fatty Acids (HUFAs) allow them to synthesise this protective protein, granting them tolerance to radiation year-round.

Within the pools, these relatively small (~1 mm long adult) organisms can thrive as generalist benthic foragers, feeding primarily on biofilms of phytoplankton and other microbes on the rock pool bed. They also feed on pelagic phytoplankton present in the water and on epiphytic biofilms covering the dominant rock pool alga; Enteromorpha intestinalis. Aside from a feeding platform, T. brevicornis take advantage of the algae's hollow nature and are known to dwell within the actual thallus of the green macroalga. Especially during times of desiccation, the thallus provides a moist refugium for the copepod when rock pools completely dry out. Several hundred individuals can be found in a single strand of the hollow seaweed, where they can survive weeks longer compared to natural desiccation. Even when Enteromorpha spp. aren't present in splash pools and conditions are getting too dry, the copepod can burrow down where the loose sandstone still holds moisture. These behavioural adaptations may be a key explanation in how this species can live and thrive in such an environment as extreme and as variable as the supratidal.

Part of the Harpacticoid copepods of the genus Tigriopus Norman 1868, T. brevicornis belong to the subclass Copepoda which is of high ecological importance. Copepoda is the second largest Crustacean taxa and approximately 12,000 species of copepods have been described. They are one of the dominant taxa in aquatic zooplankton communities representing 70% of the ocean’s biomass and thus the principal link between the phytoplankton and higher trophic levels. Harpacticoids also play an important role in the marine meiobenthic food web, especially as food for juvenile fish.

== Phylogeography, metapopulation and genetics studies ==
Supratidal splash pools are often so high on the shoreline that they can become isolated from the coastal water and neighbouring pools for long periods of time. From this, scientists have speculated whether these neighbouring pools actually have different populations of copepods, and found that some pools only metres apart may never share genes through cross breeding. The upper shore rock pool mosaic with interspersed copepod communities therefore forms a metapopulation. This is a rare occurrence in a marine system, where dispersal ability is usually less impaired. This extremely restricted dispersal has perplexed researchers, as phylogeographical studies have shown that despite this, distant relatives of T. brevicornis were capable of occasional long distance transport, colonising large geographic areas within the last 12 to 15 thousand years. A 1 mm long copepod somehow managed to traverse the Atlantic Ocean in the past - over 4000 kilometres.

== Reproduction and development ==
T. brevicornis undergoes several stages of development, with 12 distinctive post-embryonic developmental stages; 6 naupliar (copepod baby) stages, 5 copepodid (teenage) stages and an adult stage. Animals are sexually dimorphic and males are usually slightly smaller than females, possessing enlarged antennules. These antennules are used to perform a characteristic mate-guarding behaviour to secure a potential mate, where they grasp females before the actual mating event. Mating pairs will stay attached for several hours, and sperm is stored in a special organ known as a spermatheca. Females are highly fecund and usually bear multiple broods of eggs developed sequentially after a single mating with brood sizes of 30–50 nauplii. Fertilised T. brevicornis females are easily identifiable by the presence of a large dark egg sac attached to their hind segment. Other Tigriopus spp. females have varying numbers of egg sacs attached posteriorly (see image below).

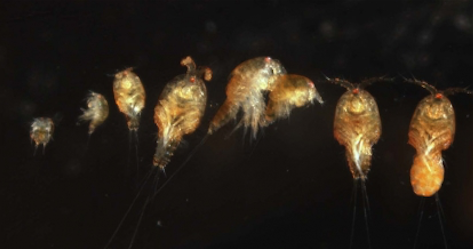
Different developmental stages of the marine harpacticoid copepod Tigriopus brevicornis and a mating pair - Male grasping female.

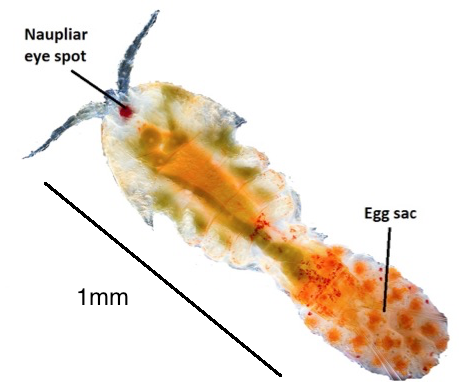
T. brevicornis female with characteristic single posterior egg sac.

== Behaviour ==
Studies on different behavioural traits of this species has been useful for understanding how it survives in its extreme environment.

=== Swimming and feeding ===
Although classed as a benthic copepod, this particular species of Tigriopus is surprisingly motile, and has been noted to spend prolonged amounts of time in the water column of experimental mesocosms. While copepodites (adults) have six pairs of cephalic appendages used for swimming and food collection and up to five pairs of specialized ‘‘swimming legs’’ allocated for jumping, nauplii have only three pairs of appendages to be used for motion and feeding. Therefore, the kinematics of nauplii is different from that of adults. They have a swimming-by-jumping propulsion mode, with alternating power and recovery strokes of three pairs of cephalic appendages. This is fundamentally different from the way other microplankton move, and the propulsion efficiency of the nauplii is low. Very early T. brevicornis naupliar stages tend to crawl on the substrate they are feeding on, and this may hinder their motility even further. An interesting trait of some nauplii is to beat their appendages while being stationary, which results in the creation of a strong feeding current that is about 10 times faster than the average translation speed of the nauplius. More efficient feeding is a result of this clever adaptation.

=== Cannibalism ===
Adult T. brevicornis have been shown to eat the first two developmental stages of nauplii (N1 and N2) when population densities are high or when food availability is low. Speculation concerning the females' ability to recognise their own young and therefore not eat them is no longer supported, as more recent studies have indicated that this kin recognition does not exist within the genus Tigriopus. This is further supported by the fact that T. brevicornis produce several large broods of eggs per year, and any form of parental care would be highly unlikely given their huge energy investment in producing so many offspring.

== Applications ==
Given the species' high natural abundances and their occurrence as a nuisance species in some brine shrimp / rotifer aquaculture tanks, these copepods were further researched as a potential live feed for larviculture thereafter.

=== Aquaculture ===
Tigriopus brevicornis and many other copepod species have been analysed for their effectiveness as a live feed in marine larviculture (larvae aquaculture). Essentially, the larval stage of most fish and crustaceans is the most important for healthy growth and development into an economically feasible human commodity. When the fish larvae are fed with traditional feeds of brine shrimp or rotifers, these larvae can develop growth defects and malpigmentation can also occur. Copepods are rich in Highly Unsaturated Fatty Acids (HUFAs) which are essential for optimal fish larvae growth and development. The copepod is a product, reared in huge hundred litre tanks, fed with nearby-cultured micro algae and the nauplii would be constantly filtered out, leaving the adults and copepodites (teenagers) inside the mass culture vessels. These naulpii would be introduced to the larval rearing tanks where the larvae preferentially eat the nauplii. Reasons for T. brevicornis's effectiveness as a live feed are numerous:

- They have a generally short body size (< 1 mm for adults and nauplii are ~75 μm).
- They can reach high population growth rates (independent of high densities) with relatively short generation times (~ 3 to 4 weeks) all of which can be attained in mass culture systems.

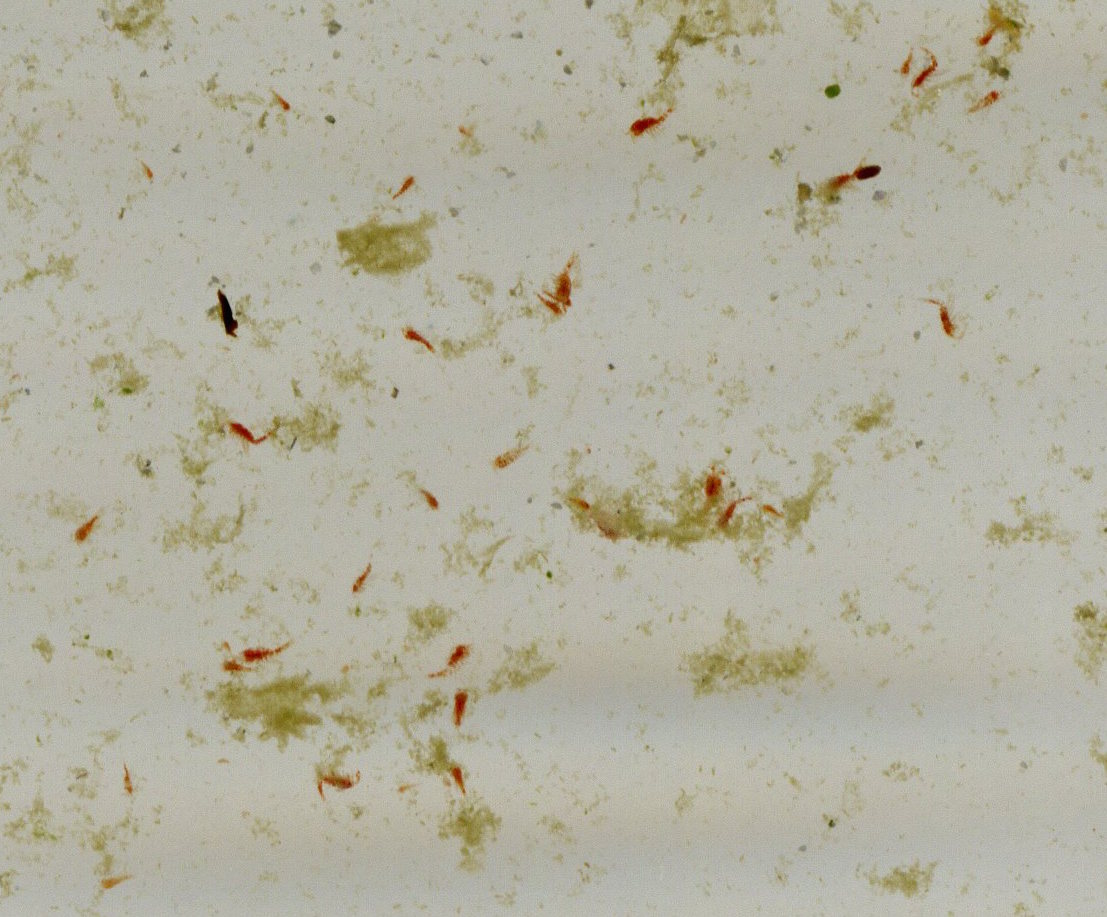
Scanning image of a Western Irish population of Tigriopus brevicornis. After death, the Orange pigment Astaxanthin becomes intensified.

- Nauplii and adults swim in the water column, except the first two naupliar stages who crawl on the substratum.
- Cannibalism only occurs by adults on the first two naupliar stages, which can be avoided by the aforementioned filtration system.
- Cheap and versatile feeding due to their generalistic feeding habits - they have the ability to transform simple sugars into complex biomolecules. They will eat anything from baker's yeast to fruit juice to any formulated fish feed.
- Rich presence of Highly Unsaturated Fatty Acids (HUFAs) when fed microalgae. This HUFA content can be maintained even after the individual has been frozen at -80 degrees Celsius and processed into a commercial paste to maximise transport potential and shelf life.
- Extreme stress tolerance allows the species to be grown in many different conditions and locations around the globe.
