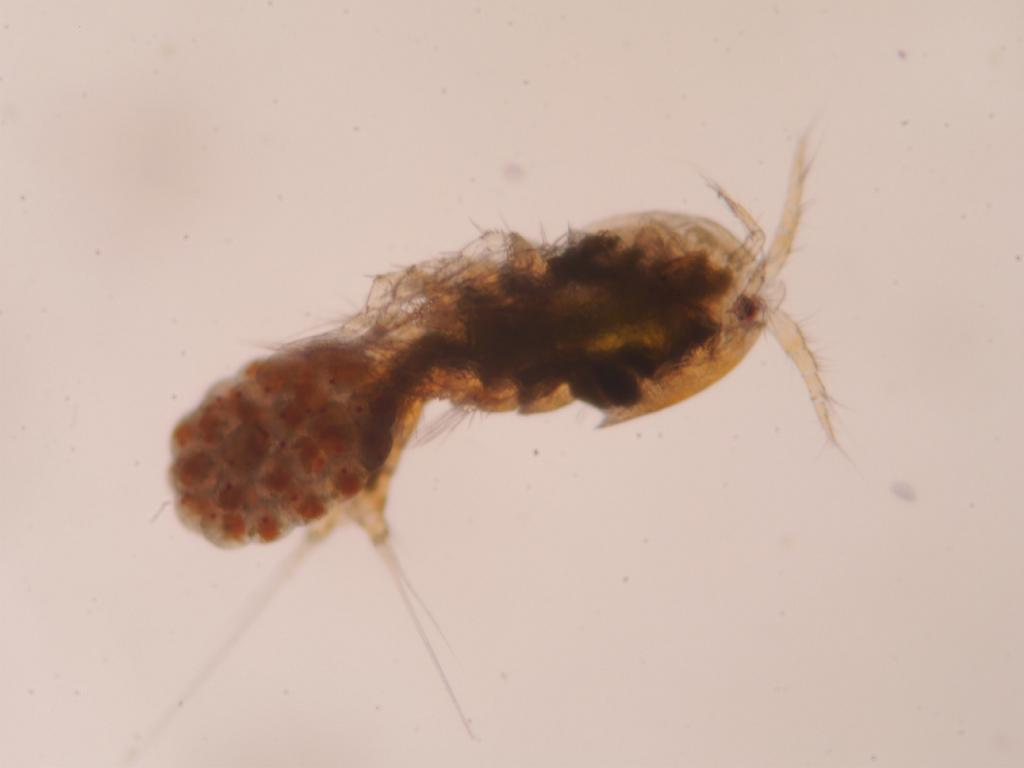

Scientific classification
- Kingdom: Animalia
- Phylum: Arthropoda
- Class: Copepoda
- Order: Harpacticoida
- Family: Harpacticidae
- Genus: Tigriopus; Norman, 1869

= Tigriopus =

Genus of crustaceans

Tigriopus is a genus of copepods in the family Harpacticidae, containing the following species:

- Tigriopus angulatus Lang, 1933
- Tigriopus brachydactylus Candeias, 1959
- Tigriopus brevicornis (O. F. Müller, 1776)
- Tigriopus californicus (Baker, 1912)
- Tigriopus crozettensis Soyer et al., 1987
- Tigriopus fulvus (Fischer, 1860)
- Tigriopus igai Itô, 1977
- Tigriopus incertus Smirnov, 1932
- Tigriopus japonicus Mori, 1938
- Tigriopus kerguelenensis Soyer et al., 1987
- Tigriopus minutus Bozic, 1960
- Tigriopus raki Bradford, 1967
- Tigriopus sirindhornae Chullasorn et al., 2013
- Tigriopus thailandensis Chullasorn et al., 2012
