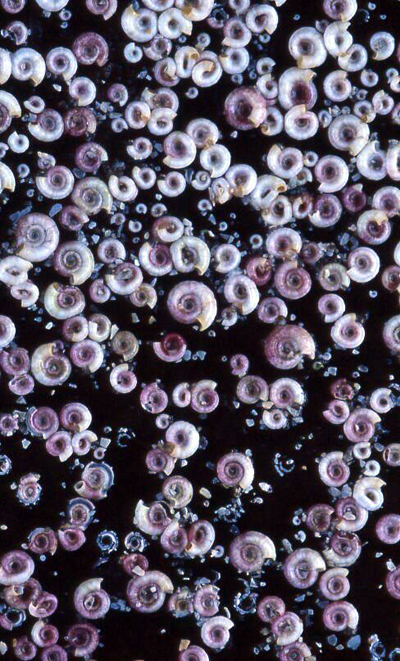
- Spirorbis spirorbis on kelp on the Isle of Mull

Scientific classification
- Kingdom: Animalia
- Phylum: Annelida
- Clade: Pleistoannelida
- Clade: Sedentaria
- Order: Sabellida
- Family: Serpulidae
- Genus: Spirorbis
- Species: S. spirorbis

Binomial name
- Spirorbis spirorbis (Linnaeus, 1758)

Synonyms
- Spirorbis borealis Daudin, 1800; Serpulis spirorbis Linnaeus, 1758

= Spirorbis spirorbis =

Species of annelid worm

Spirorbis spirorbis or Spirorbis borealis is a small (3–4 mm) coiled sedentary marine polychaete worm in the Serpulidae family that lives attached to seaweeds and eel grass in shallow saltwater. It is commonly called the sinistral spiral tubeworm and is the type species of the genus Spirorbis.

It was first described in 1758 by Carl Linnaeus as Serpula spirorbis.

S. spirorbis is a cross-fertilising hermaphrodite that broods its young in a tube attached to the worm inside the shell. The larvae are released at an advanced stage of development and spend just a few hours as free-living organisms before attaching themselves to the nearest suitable surface, often the same seaweed as the parent.

== Description ==
S. spirorbis secretes a very small, unridged, off-white, calcareous tube. This is about five millimetres in diameter and forms a flat, clockwise spiral coil as seen from above. The worm retreats into its tube when above water but under water can be seen to have green tentacles.

The species has a smooth, white, sinistral (left-handed) coiled shell encasing an orange body about 3 mm in length. The tube has a peripheral flange where it attaches to the substrate.

The worm has a short abdominal region and a slightly broader thorax terminating in ten stiff tentacles, used to filter food from the water. One of the tentacles is slightly larger than the rest and shaped like a saucer, which is used as an operculum. This seals the opening of the shell and serves to protect the worm from predators and desiccation when out of water.

== Distribution and habitat ==
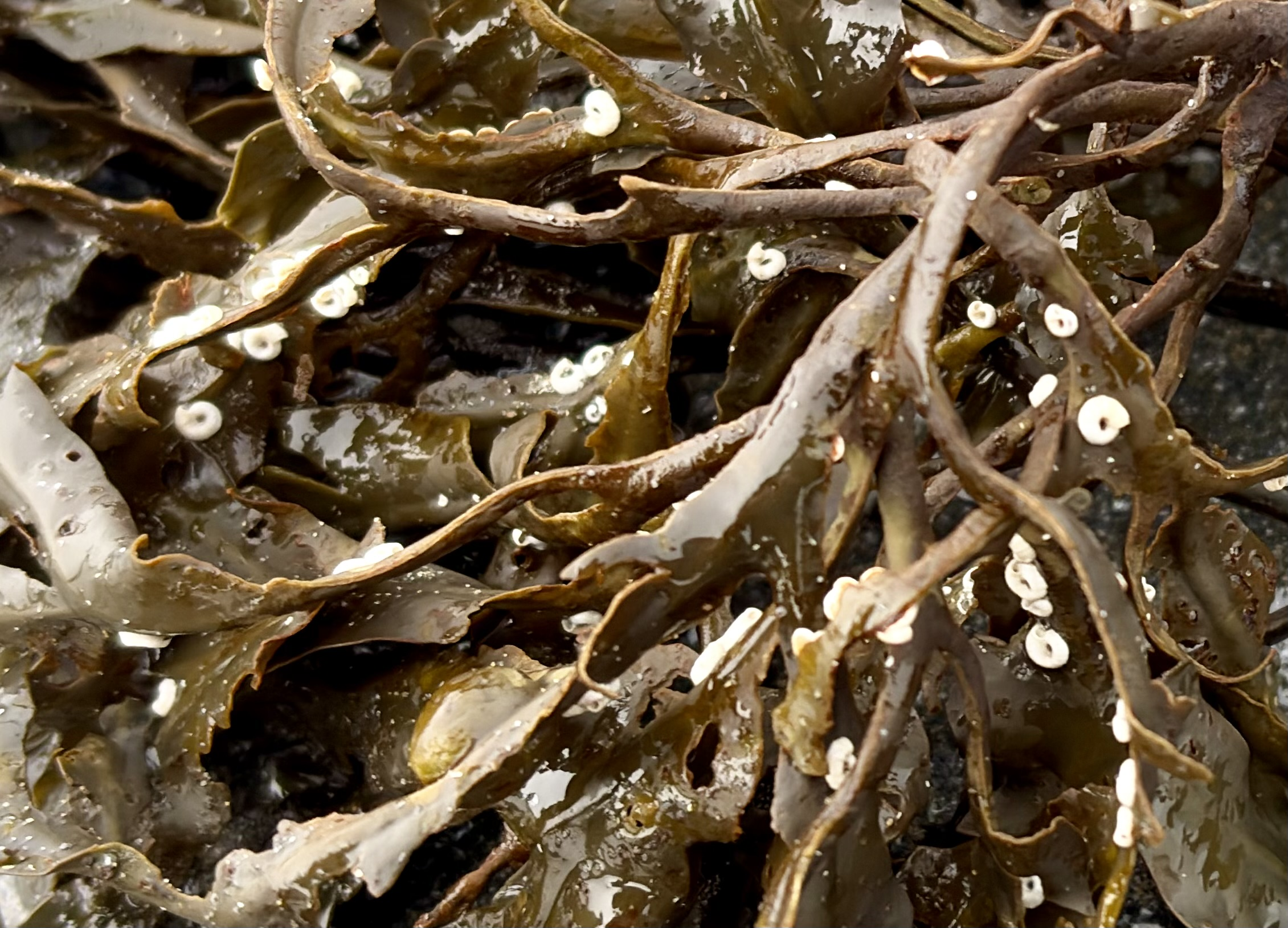
Spirorbis spirorbis on Fucaceae, Pembrokeshire, Wales

S. spirorbis is found on either side of the north Atlantic Ocean. This includes the coasts of Great Britain, Ireland, Spain and Portugal, Prince Edward Island, Newfoundland, the Gulf of St Lawrence and the St Lawrence estuary, perhaps even North Norway to the English Channel and Cape Cod. It is typically found growing on Fucus, Laminaria and other seaweeds as well as on rocks and stones. It is widely distributed and abundant on the middle and lower shore, down to a depth of about thirty metres.

== Biology ==
S. spirorbis is a hermaphrodite. The segments at the front of the abdomen are female while those at the back are male. The male and female gonads mature at much the same time but the sperm is usually released first. Fertilisation is external to the body but inside the tube. The larvae are free swimming member of the plankton for a short time. They then settle out. In a study, where fronds of Fucus serratus already colonised by adults were available for settling, the larvae avoided the most densely populated areas and favoured the concave grooves on either side of the midribs. When prevented from settling out for eight hours, they were much less selective and settled on any Fucus surface regardless of the presence of adults.

== Gallery ==
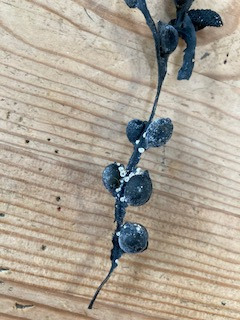
Spirorbis spirorbis on Fucus, on the beach at Mwnt, Ceredigion
