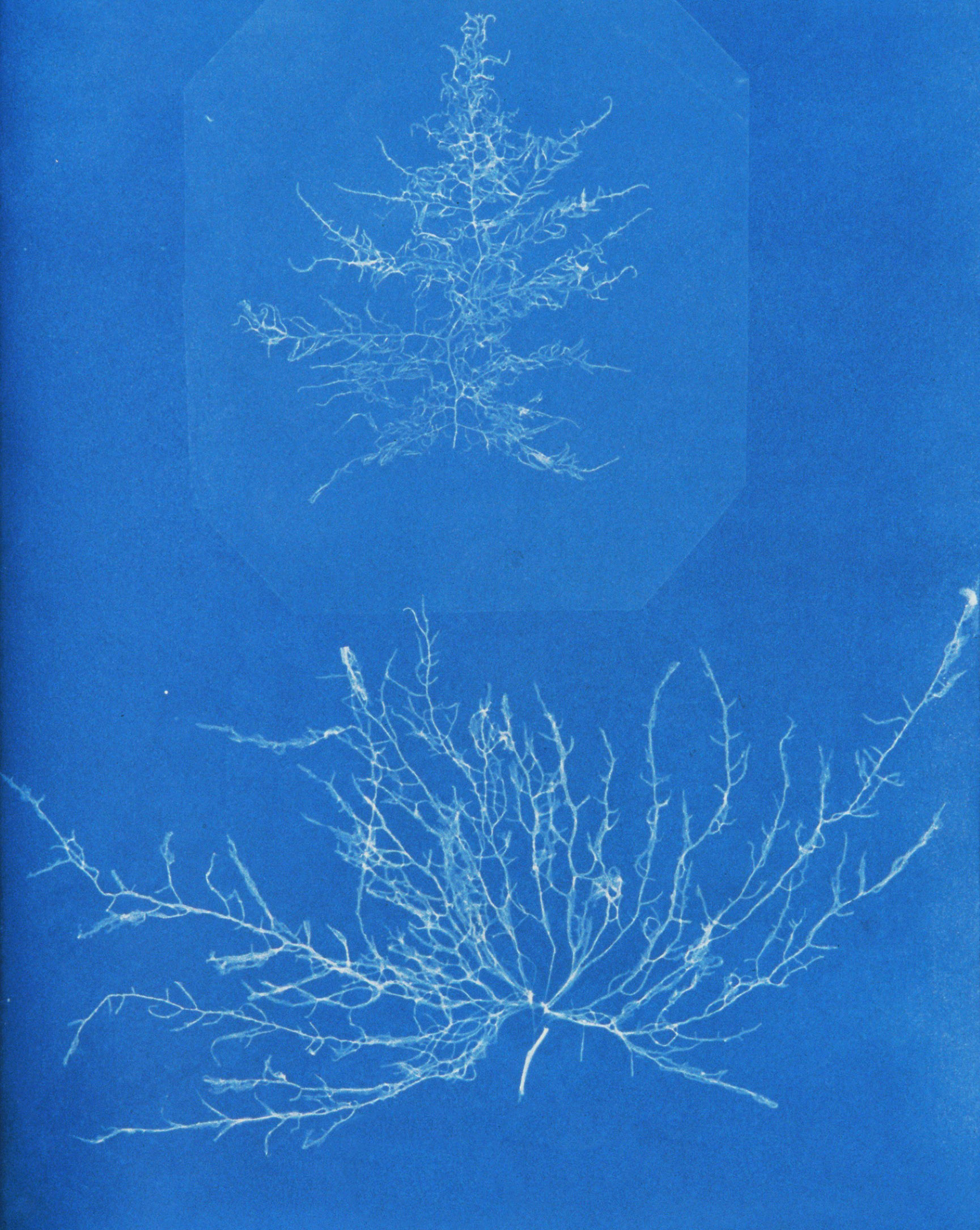

Scientific classification
- Domain: Eukaryota
- Clade: Archaeplastida
- Division: Rhodophyta
- Class: Florideophyceae
- Order: Nemaliales
- Family: Nemaliaceae
- Genus: Nemalion
- Species: N. helminthoides

Binomial name
- Nemalion helminthoides (Velley) Batters

Synonyms
- Mesogloia hudsonii

= Nemalion helminthoides =

Species of alga

Nemalion helminthoides is a small marine alga in the division Rhodophyta.

== Description ==
This is a fairly large erect alga which grows to no more than 0.4 m long. The frond is erect with a solid axis. It is very mucilaginous and has few branches which are elongate growing from a discoid base. The central strand is composed of filaments intricately entangled.

== Habitat ==
Midlittoral, epilithic and on BalanusPatella.

== Reproduction ==
The life-history is not fully confirmed. However carpospores and tetrasporangia have been recorded.

== Distribution ==
Generally distributed around the European coast and the Atlantic coast of North America.

== Note ==
The spelling of the specific name is in older references spelt without the first letter "h". However helminthoides is considered more correct.
