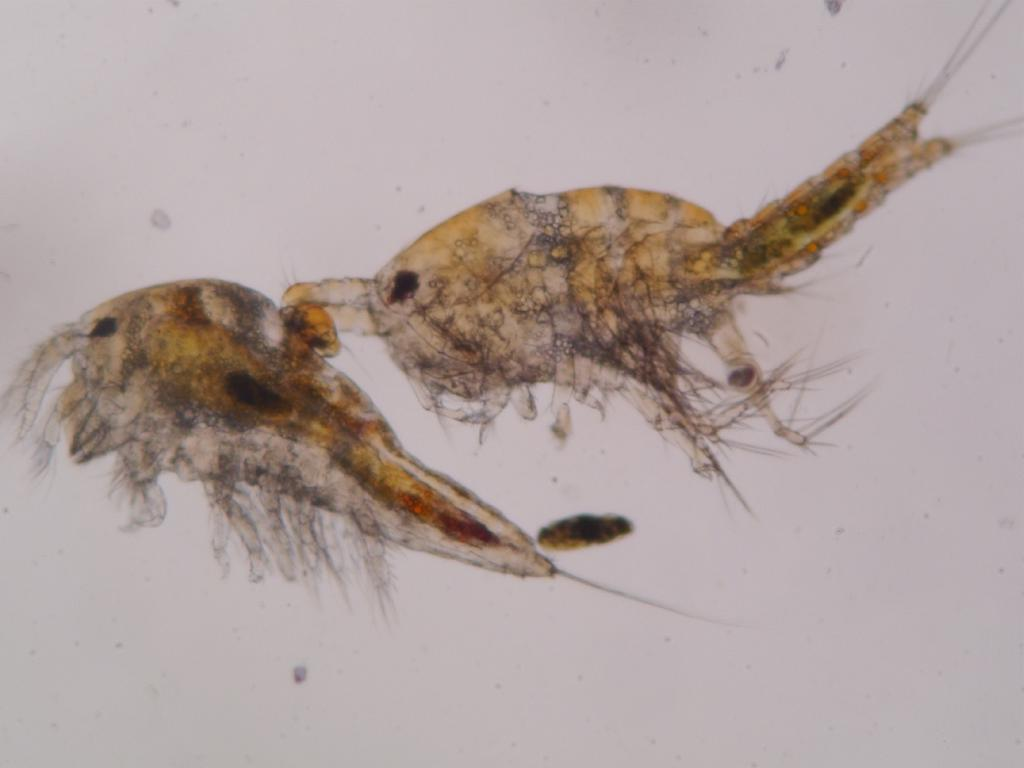

Scientific classification
- Kingdom: Animalia
- Phylum: Arthropoda
- Clade: Pancrustacea
- Class: Copepoda
- Order: Harpacticoida
- Family: Harpacticidae; Dana, 1846

Synonyms
- Ismardiidae Leigh-Sharpe, 1936

= Harpacticidae =

Family of copepod crustaceans

Harpacticidae is a family of copepods, containing the following genera:

- Archizausodes Bouck, Thistle & Huys, 1999
- Arpacticus H. Milne-Edwards, 1840
- Campella C. B. Wilson, 1924
- Discoharpacticus Noodt, 1954
- Handiella Brehm, 1924
- Harpacticella G. O. Sars, 1908
- Harpacticus H. Milne-Edwards, 1840
- Mucropedia Bouck, Thistle & Huys, 1999
- Neozausodes Bouck, Thistle & Huys, 1999
- Paratigriopus Itô, 1969
- Perissocope Brady, 1910
- Tigriopus Norman, 1869
- Zaus Goodsir, 1845
- Zausodes C. B. Wilson, 1932
- Zausopsis Lang, 1934
