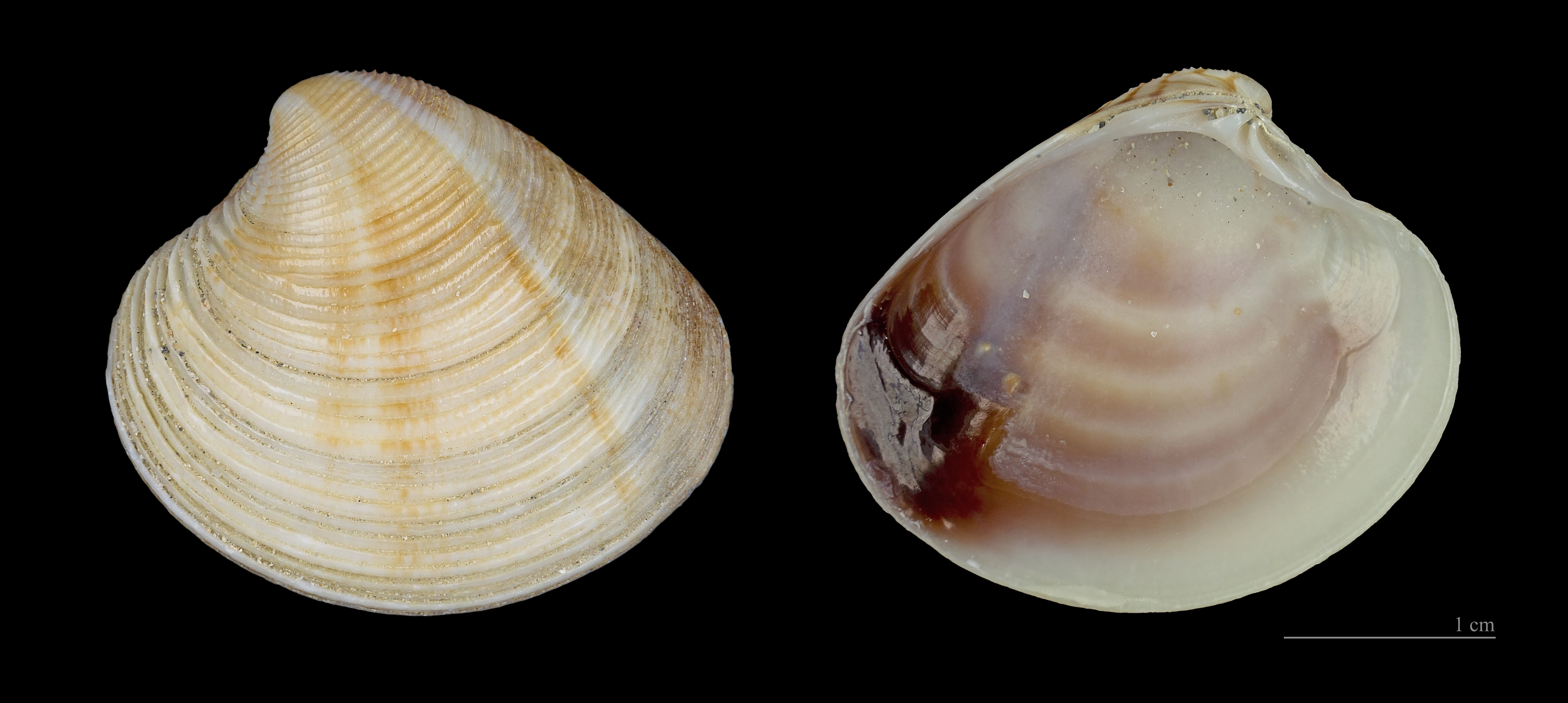

Scientific classification
- Kingdom: Animalia
- Phylum: Mollusca
- Class: Bivalvia
- Order: Venerida
- Superfamily: Veneroidea
- Family: Veneridae
- Genus: Chamelea
- Species: C. gallina

Binomial name
- Chamelea gallina (Linnaeus, 1758)

Synonyms
- Venus gallina Linnaeus, 1758; Venus striatula E. M. da Costa, 1778; Venus sinuata Born, 1778; Venus corrugatula Krynicki, 1837; Venus nucleus Statuti, 1880; Venus nuculata Locard, 1892; Chione schottii Dall, 1902

= Chamelea gallina =

Species of bivalve

Chamelea gallina is a species of small saltwater clam, a marine bivalve in the family Veneridae, the venus clams.

== Taxonomy ==
Carl Linnaeus originally described Venus gallina from the Mediterranean Sea in 1758. It was not clear whether da Costa's 1778 Pectunculus striatulus was a different northern species or not.

Linnaeus afterwards mentioned that his V. gallina also occurs in Oceano Norvegico. In 1952, following Dodge, the name Chamelea gallina was considered to be valid. There were for a while two recognised subspecies: the Mediterranean C. g. gallina, and the Atlantic C. g. striatula. However by 2016, the two subspecies were elevated to the species level, and listed separately on the database WoRMS.

== Characteristics ==
The shell is solid and thick, with two equal sized valves and up to five centimetres long. It is broadly triangular but asymmetrical, having a round anterior margin but a somewhat elongated posterior. The periostracum is thin and the ligament connecting the two valves is narrow. The lunule is short and heart-shaped, light brown with fine radiating ridges. The shell is sculptured with about fifteen concentric ridges. The colour is whitish, cream or pale yellow, sometimes shiny, and usually with three red-brown radiating rays.

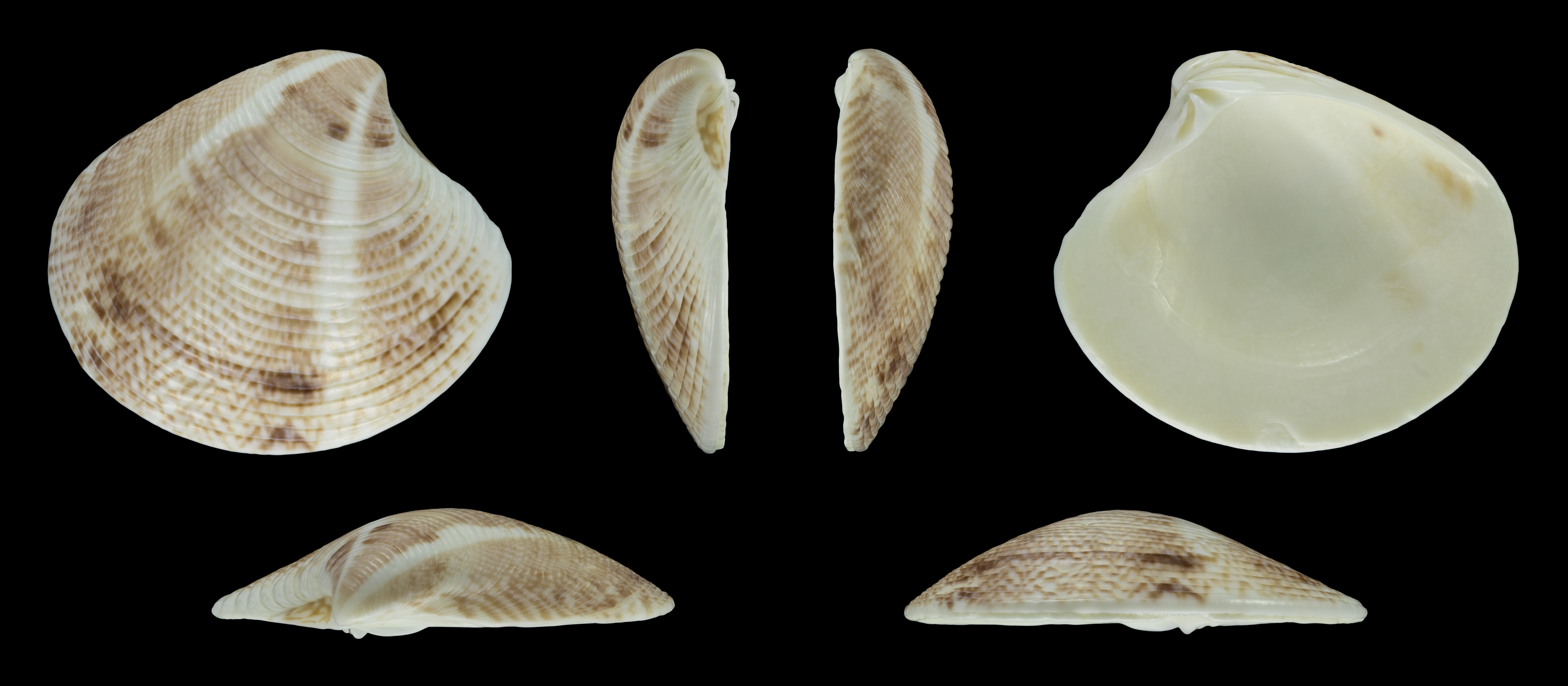
Right valve

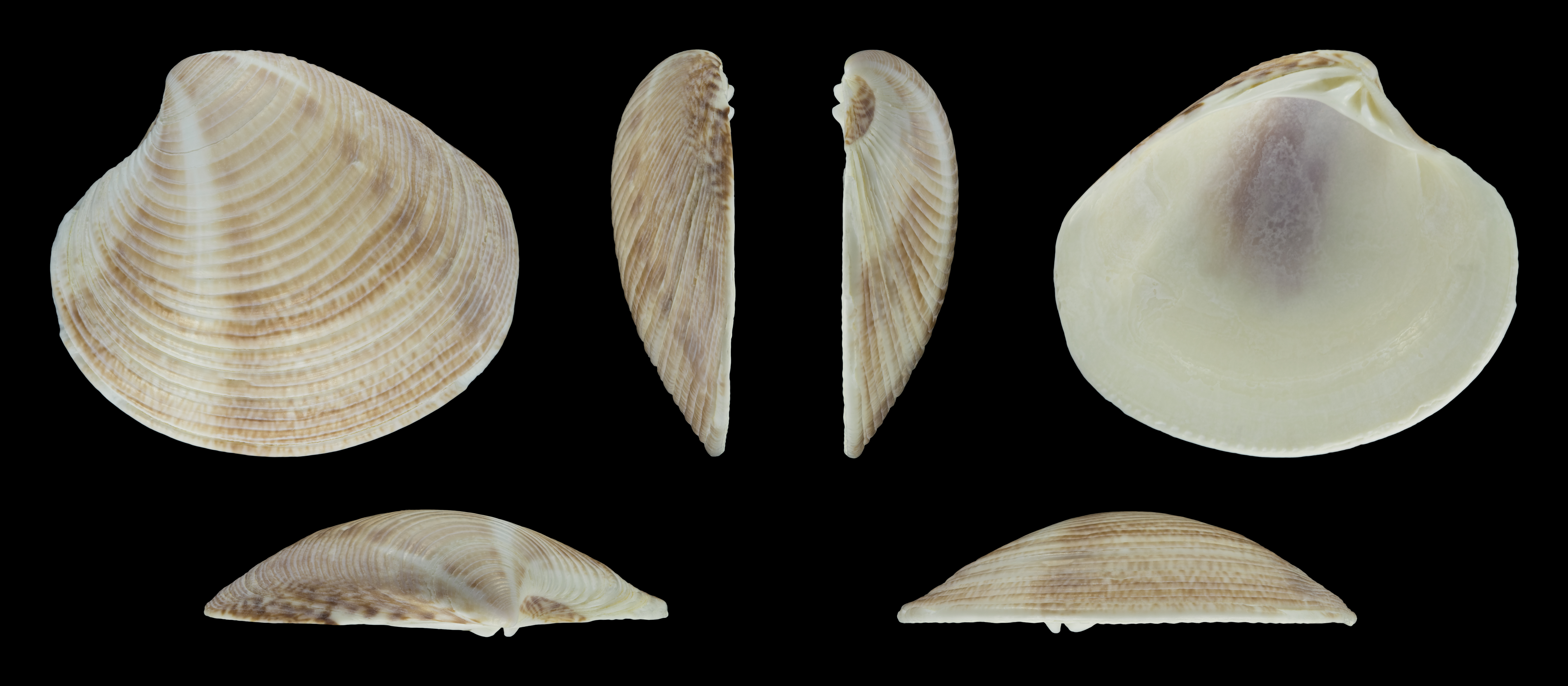
Left valve

var. corrugatula

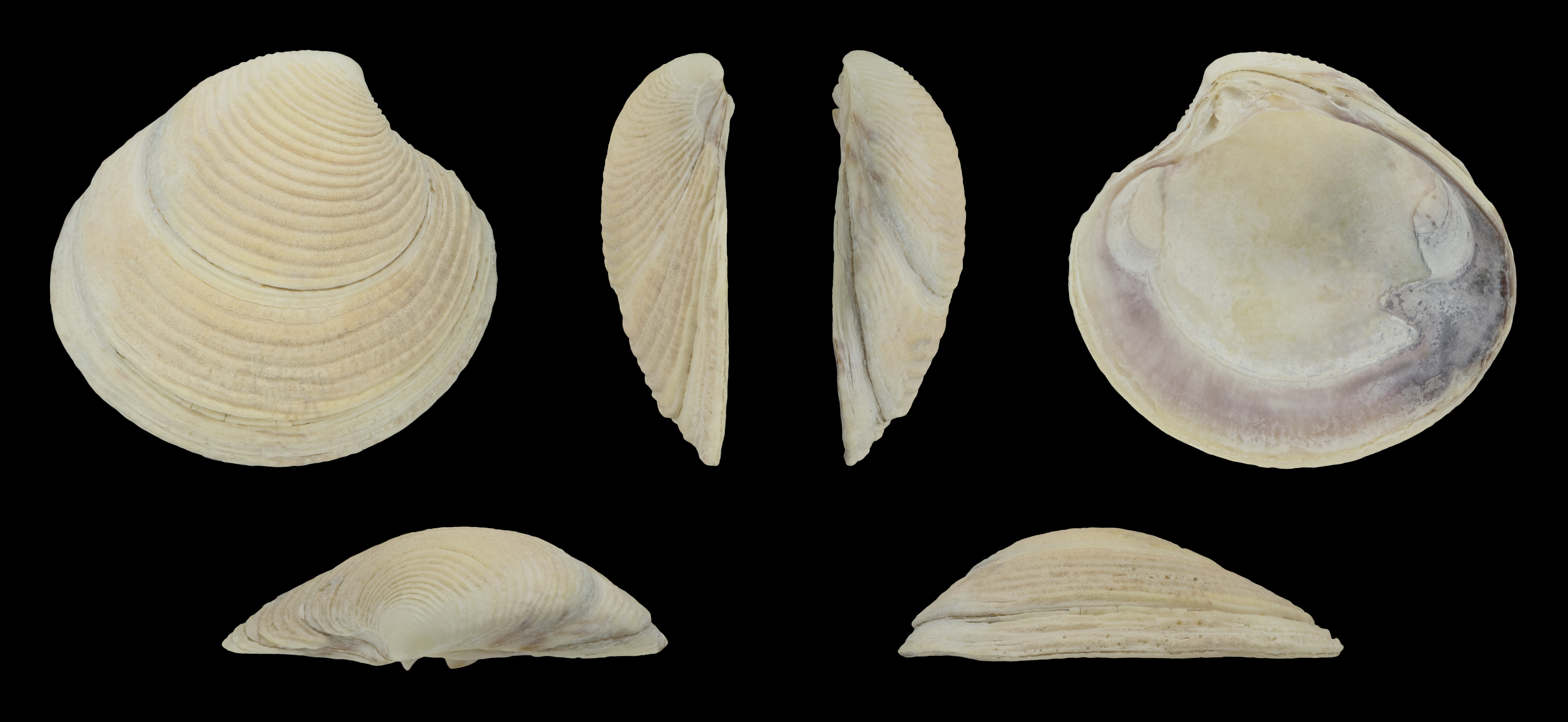
Right valve

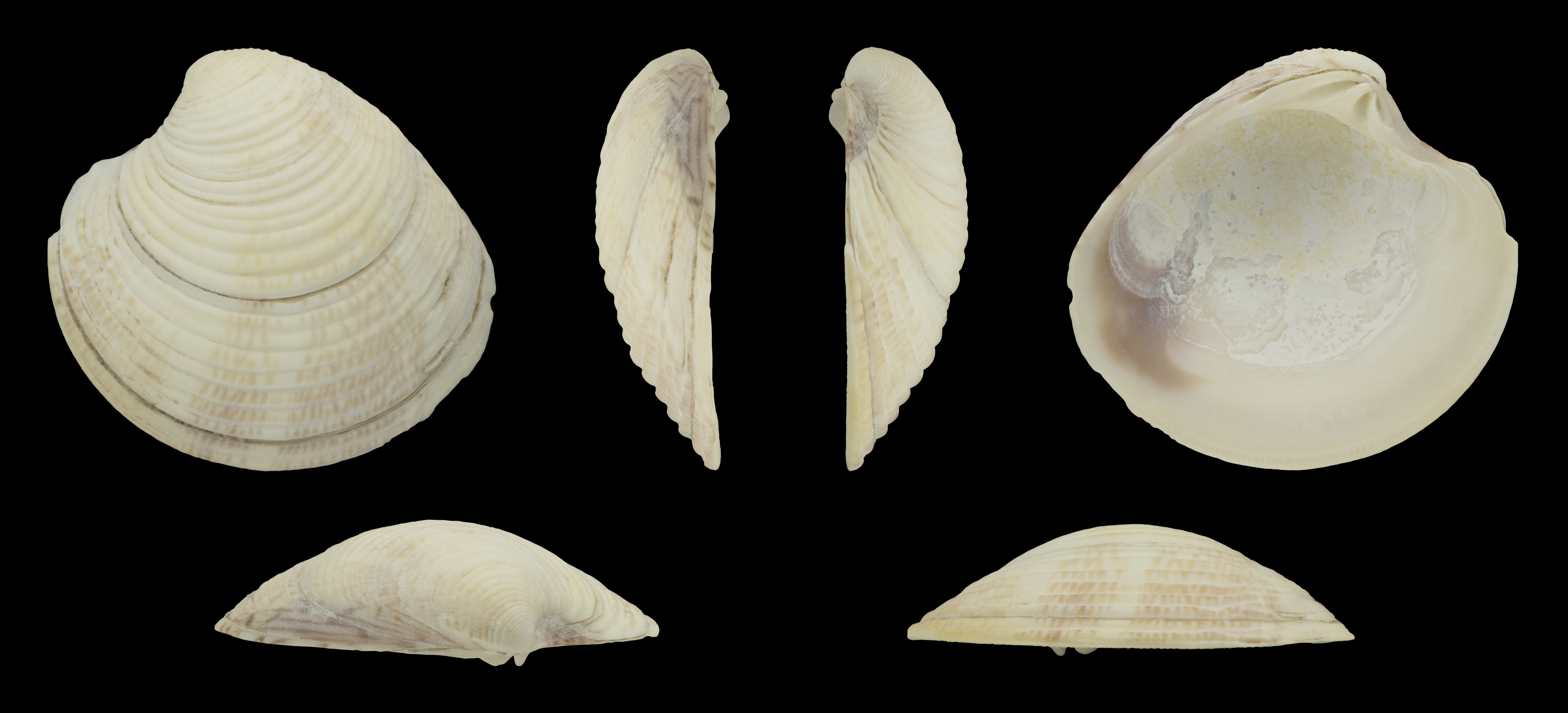
Left valve

var. major

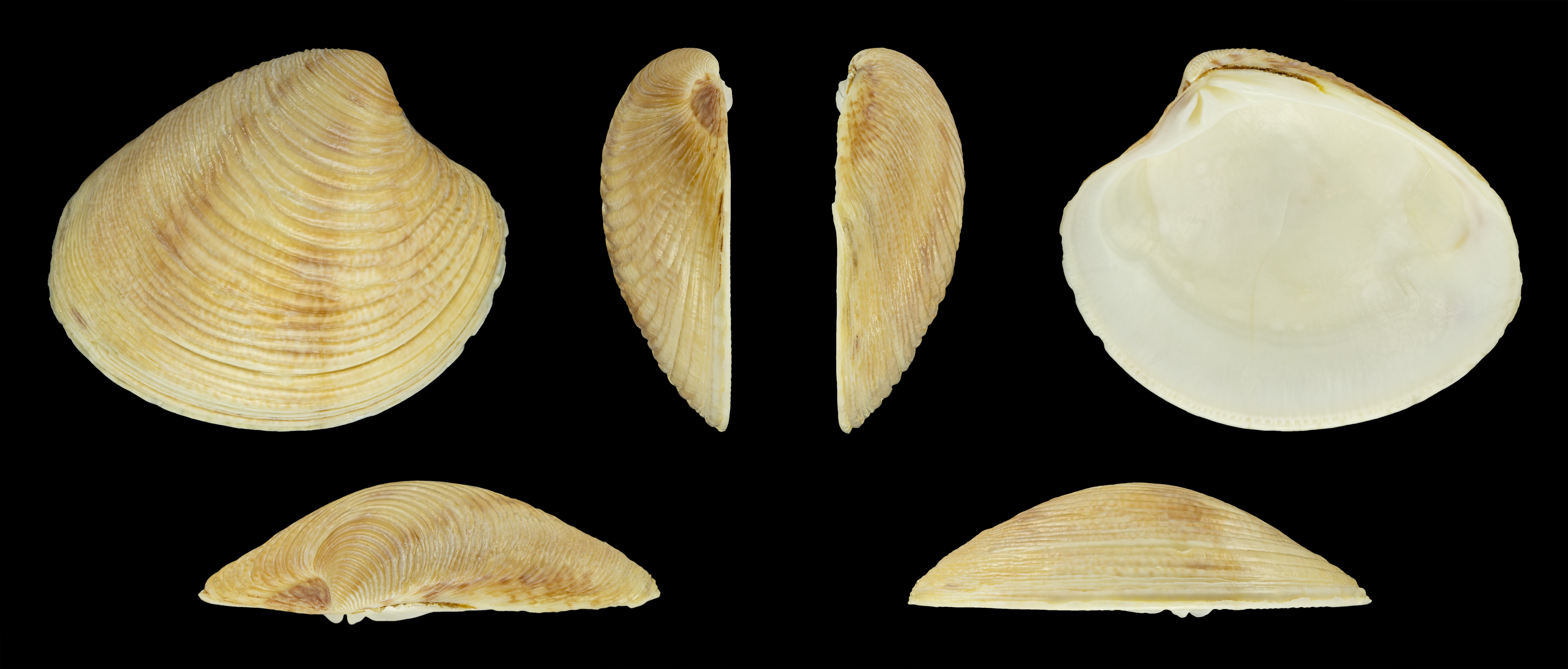
Right valve

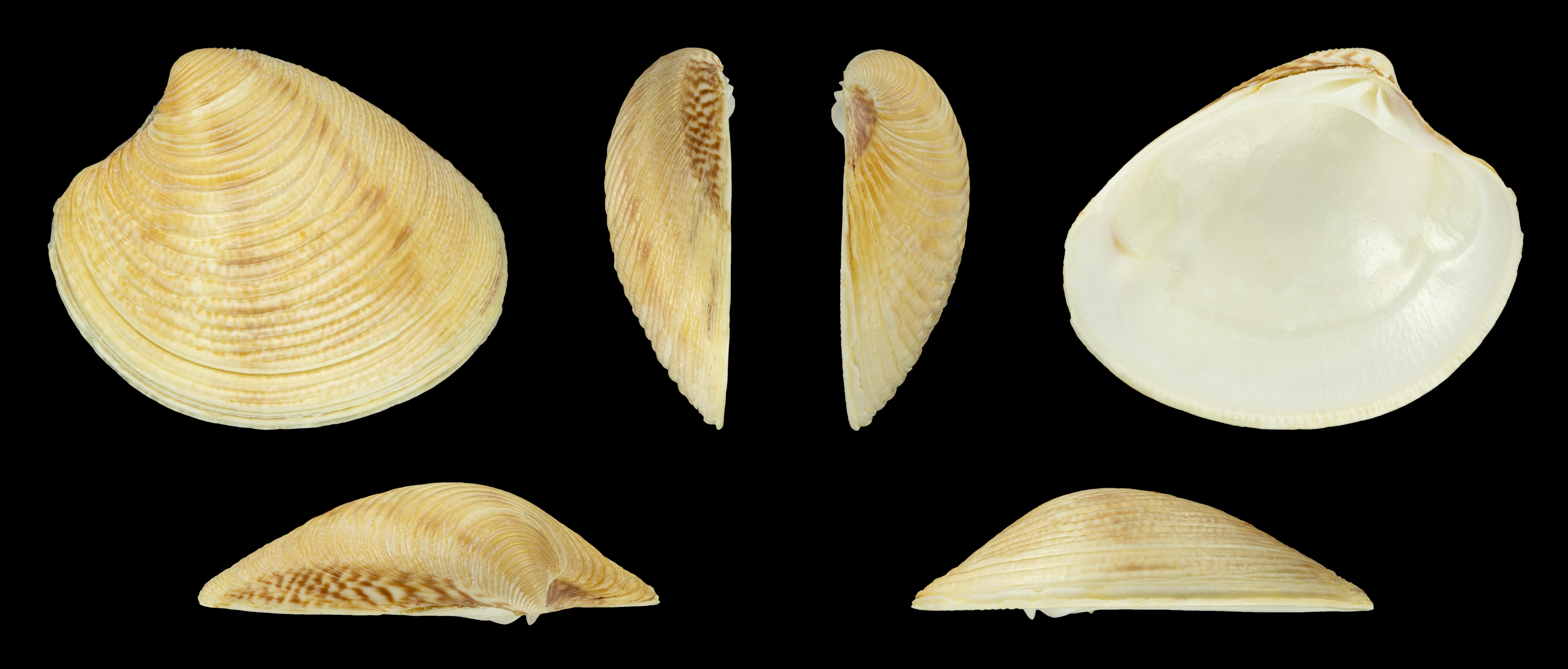
Left valve

== Distribution ==
Chamelea gallina occurs on Eastern Atlantic coasts, from Norway and the British Isles, Portugal, Morocco, Madeira and the Canary Islands. It is also found in the Mediterranean Sea and the Black Sea and is abundant in the Adriatic Sea.

== Biology ==
Chamelea gallina lives under the surface of clean and muddy sand at a depth of between five and twenty metres. It is a filter feeder, taking in a variety of microalgae, bacteria and small particles of detritus.

== Uses ==
This species is used for food. In 1995 the total recorded catch was 42,000 tons with the largest catches being taken by Italy and Turkey. The shells are mostly caught with dredges but some bottom trawling is done and some aquaculture takes place in Italy.

== European law ==
The European Union regulament n° 1667/2006 has forbidden the commerce of clams having a length less than 25 millimeters. The full list of the forbidden marine species is available as an annex of the Habitats Directive.

The new EU limit to the length of clams came into force in 2010. Two years later, the sanctions started to include a fine up to a maximum of 4,000 euros, besides to the seizure of the catch and the closure of the activity.

The norm recalled a decree adopted by the Italian President Saragat in 1968 and created a severe economic damage for the Italian enterprises belonging to the ittic sector, characterized by a production of clams 22 millimeters long. That type of clam is an historic production of the Adriatic Sea mainly in Venice and Chioggia, but also in Rimini and the Romagnole Coast), and even in Campania due to the climate change and a new different mean saltiness of the Italian seas. which blocks the adult claim's growth at a diameter of around 22 mm.

Against an intensive lobbying activity of the Spanish deputies at the European Parliament, in June 2016 the Italian parties reached a temporary triennal exception to the limit, in order to avoid the crisis of the ittic sector and to protect an Italian typical production. On 9 October 2019, the exception was firstly delayed for another year until 31 December 2020. Italian organizations are pressing to the EU Parliament to concede a new dispensation form the limit of 25 millimeters.
