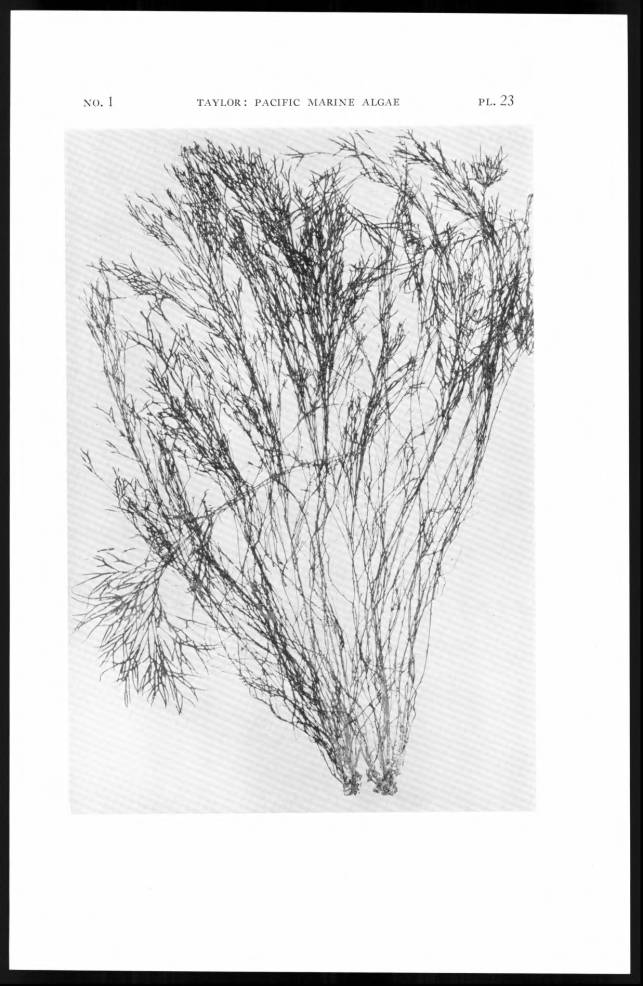

Conservation status
- Critically endangered, possibly extinct (IUCN 3.1)

Scientific classification
- Domain: Eukaryota
- Clade: Sar
- Clade: Stramenopiles
- Phylum: Ochrophyta
- Class: Phaeophyceae
- Order: Fucales
- Family: Sargassaceae
- Genus: Bifurcaria
- Species: B. galapagensis

Binomial name
- Bifurcaria galapagensis (Piccone & Grunow) Womersley 1964

Synonyms
- Blossevillea galapagensis (Piccone & Grunow) W.R.Taylor 1945; Pelvetia galapagensis (Piccone & Grunow) De Toni 1895; Fucodium galapagense Piccone & Grunow 1886

= Bifurcaria galapagensis =

Probably-extinct algae seaweed

Bifurcaria galapagensis, the Galapagos stringweed, is a species of brown algae seaweed endemic to the Galapagos Islands. The IUCN Red List categorized the algae as Critically Endangered (Possibly Extinct), after a March 2007 assessment noted that the plant hadn't been since 1983.

William Randolph Taylor documented Galapagos stringweed (then Blossevillea galapagensis) alongside myriad other Pacific marine algae during a three-month expedition to Baja California, Central and South America, and the Galapagos Islands. In the intertidal zones of Isla Santa Maria, Taylor notes that "[t]he dominant algal species appeared to be Blossevillea galapagensis, a notable fucoid endemic known from the time of the Vettor Pisani Expedition. This grew high on the littoral rocks in great abundance." Taylor notes seven separate expeditions from 1872 to 1934 (including his own) that found this species.

Before its disappearance, there was some evidence to suggest that Galapagos stringweed had both antimicrobial and antimitotic properties.

== Description ==
Taylor described Bifurcaria galapagensis:

Plants gregarious, olivaceous, firm in texture, black and brittle when dried, exceeding 4 dm in height, the basal holdfasts small, irregularly lobed; branching close to the base into several main axes which are about 1.0-1.5 mm diam., and which branch irregularly into smaller divisions, especially above bearing scattered lateral determinate aculeate to filiform branchlets 1-3 cm long; above irregularly dichotomously branched, the sterile divisions slender, near the top somewhat fastigiate; fertile branches dichotomously or sometimes laterally branched, the divisions nodulose, to 2.5 mm diam., tapering, the conceptacles hermaphrodite, the oval sporangia 133-200 μ long, 46-80 μ diam., each producing one egg.

== Taxonomy ==
The classification of Bifurcaria galapagensis is uncertain, likely in part due to its scarcity; noted AlgaeBase founder M.D. Guiry points out that as of December 2017, members of the genus Bifurcaria are found only in the eastern Atlantic. This species was first classified as Fucodium galapagense in 1886 as it was apparently similar to F. tuberculatum. Bifurcaria galapagensis has several homotypic synonyms as its genus has been reassessed:

- Pelvetia galapagensis (Piccone & Grunow) De Toni 1895
- Blossevillea galapagensis (Piccone & Grunow) W.R. Taylor 1945: Based on similarities between "fructiferous parts and ha[ving] but one egg in each sporangium," Taylor decided that Galapagos stringweed was more closely related to Blossevillea brandegeei Setch & Gardner 1913 than to Bifurcaria or Pelvetia.

== Likely extinction ==
Researchers applying a key biodiversity area (KBA) methodology to the Galapagos Marine Reserve conducted numerous field surveys between 2000 and 2006 were unable to find a single B. galapagensis specimen. The researchers considered "crypsis or insufficient search effort" as possible reasons for their inability to locate sought-after species but determined that "a lack of sighting ... reflect[ed] true absence[.]" Bifurcaria galapagensis was later described—by many of the same researchers—as "regarded as probably extinct". The Spring/Summer 2010 issue of Galapagos News lamented that "[o]ne in five of the marine species listed as threatened in Galapagos may already be extinct" and that "[i]t may be too late to save the endemic Galapagos stringweed[.]"
