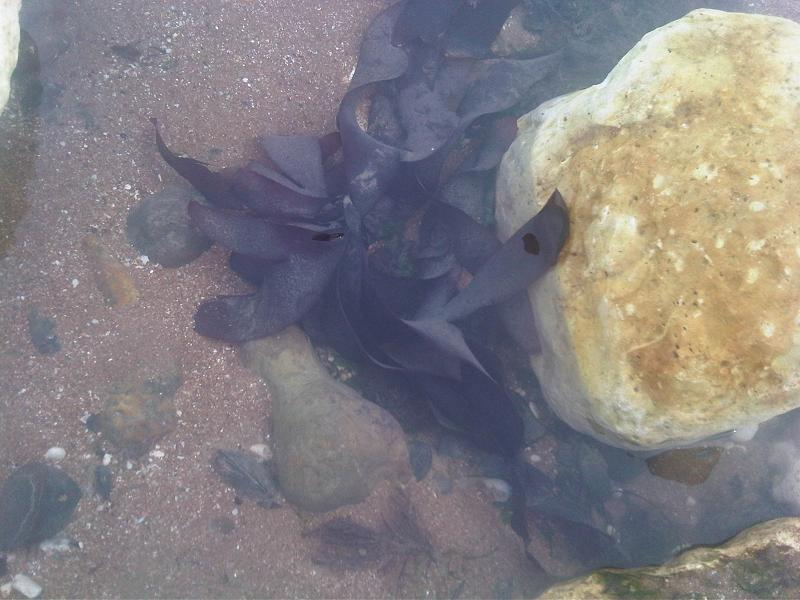
- Palmaria palmata at Broadstairs, UK

Scientific classification
- Clade: Archaeplastida
- Division: Rhodophyta
- Class: Florideophyceae
- Order: Palmariales
- Family: Palmariaceae
- Genus: Palmaria; Stackhouse, 1802

Species
- Palmaria centrocarpa (Montagne) Kuntze; Palmaria decipiens (Reinsch) R.W.Ricker; Palmaria georgica (Reinsch) R.W.Ricker; Palmaria hecatensis M.W.Hawkes; Palmaria integrifolia Selivanova & Zhigadlova; Palmaria marginicrassa I.K.Lee; Palmaria moniliformis (E.Blinova & A.D.Zinova) Perestenko; Palmaria palmata (Linnaeus) F.Weber & D.Mohr; Palmaria stenogona Perestenko

Synonyms
- Leptosarca A.Gepp & E.S.Gepp, 1905

= Palmaria (alga) =

Genus of algae

Palmaria is a genus of algae. One of its most notable members is dulse, Palmaria palmata.
