= Gongolaria elegans =

Scientific classification
- Domain: Eukaryota
- Clade: Diaphoretickes
- Clade: SAR
- Clade: Stramenopiles
- Phylum: Gyrista
- Subphylum: Ochrophytina
- Class: Phaeophyceae
- Order: Fucales
- Family: Sargassaceae
- Genus: Gongolaria
- Species: G. elegans

Binomial name
- Gongolaria elegans (Sauvageau) Molinari & Guiry, 2020

Synonyms
- Cystoseira elegans Sauvageau, 1912; Treptacantha elegans (Sauvageau) Orellana & Sansón, 2019

Species of seaweed

Gongolaria elegans (syn. Cystoseira elegans) is a species of brown algae in the family Sargassaceae endemic to the Mediterranean.

Hydroxylated diterpenoid-hydroquinones can be isolated from C. elegans.
