= Ericaria amentacea =

Scientific classification
- Domain: Eukaryota
- Clade: Sar
- Clade: Stramenopiles
- Phylum: Ochrophyta
- Class: Phaeophyceae
- Order: Fucales
- Family: Sargassaceae
- Genus: Ericaria
- Species: E. amentacea

Binomial name
- Ericaria amentacea (C.Agardh) Molinari & Guiry, 2020

Synonyms
- Cystoseira ericoides var. amentacea C.Agardh, 1821; Cystoseira amentacea (C.Agardh) Bory 1832; Halerica amentacea (C.Agardh) Kützing 1843; Gongolaria amentacea (C.Agardh) Kuntze 1891; Carpodesmia amentacea (C.Agardh) Orellana & Sansón 2019; Cystoseira amentacea var. stricta Montagne 1846; Cystoseira stricta (Montagne) Sauvageau 1911; Cystoseira stricta var. amentacea (Bory) Giaccone 1973

Species of Phaeophyceae

Ericaria amentacea (syns. Cystoseira amentacea, Carpodesmia amentacea) is a large marine brown algae.

== Distribution ==
Ericaria amentacea occurs in the Azores and the western Mediterranean Sea. It forms a species complex with Ericaria selaginoides, a similar but non caespitose species from the Northeast Atlantic and western Mediterranean.
