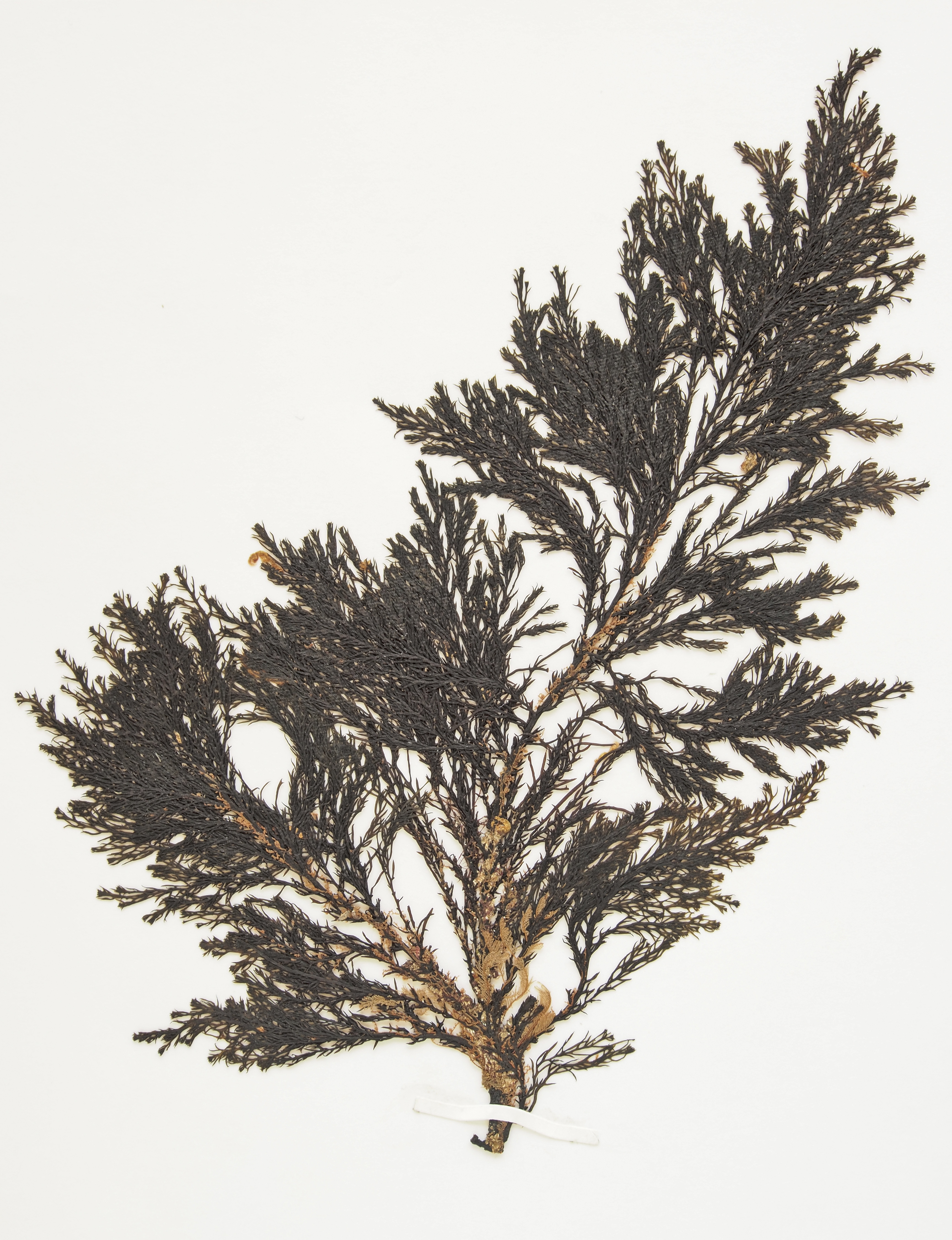
- Ericaria selaginoides, herbarium sheet

Scientific classification
- Domain: Eukaryota
- Clade: Sar
- Clade: Stramenopiles
- Phylum: Ochrophyta
- Class: Phaeophyceae
- Order: Fucales
- Family: Sargassaceae
- Genus: Ericaria
- Species: E. selaginoides

Binomial name
- Ericaria selaginoides (Linnaeus) Molinari & Guiry, 2020

Synonyms
- Fucus selaginoides Linnaeus, 1759; Cystoseira selaginoides (Linnaeus) Bory, 1832; Fucus tamariscifolius Hudson, 1762; Fucus ericoides Linnaeus, 1763; Fucus erica-marina S.G.Gmelin, 1768; Ericaria tamarisca Stackhouse, 1809; Ericaria selago Stackhouse, 1809; Phryganella ericoides (Linnaeus) Stackhouse, 1816; Cystoseira ericoides (Linnaeus) C.Agardh, 1820; Mackaia ericoides (Hudseon) S.F.Gray, 1821; Cystoseira erica-marina (S.G.Gmelin) Naccari, 1828; Gongolaria ericoides (Linnaeus) Kuntze, 1891; Cystoseira tamariscifolia (Hudson) Papenfuss, 1950; Carpodesmia tamariscifolia (Hudson) Orellana & Sansón, 2019

= Ericaria selaginoides =

Species of Phaeophyceae

Ericaria selaginoides (syns. Cystoseira tamariscifolia, Carpodesmia tamariscifolia) is a large marine brown algae.

== Distribution ==
Ericaria selaginoides occurs in the Northeast Atlantic and Western Mediterranean Sea. It forms a species complex with Ericaria amentacea, a similar but caespitose species from the Mediterranean and the Azores.
