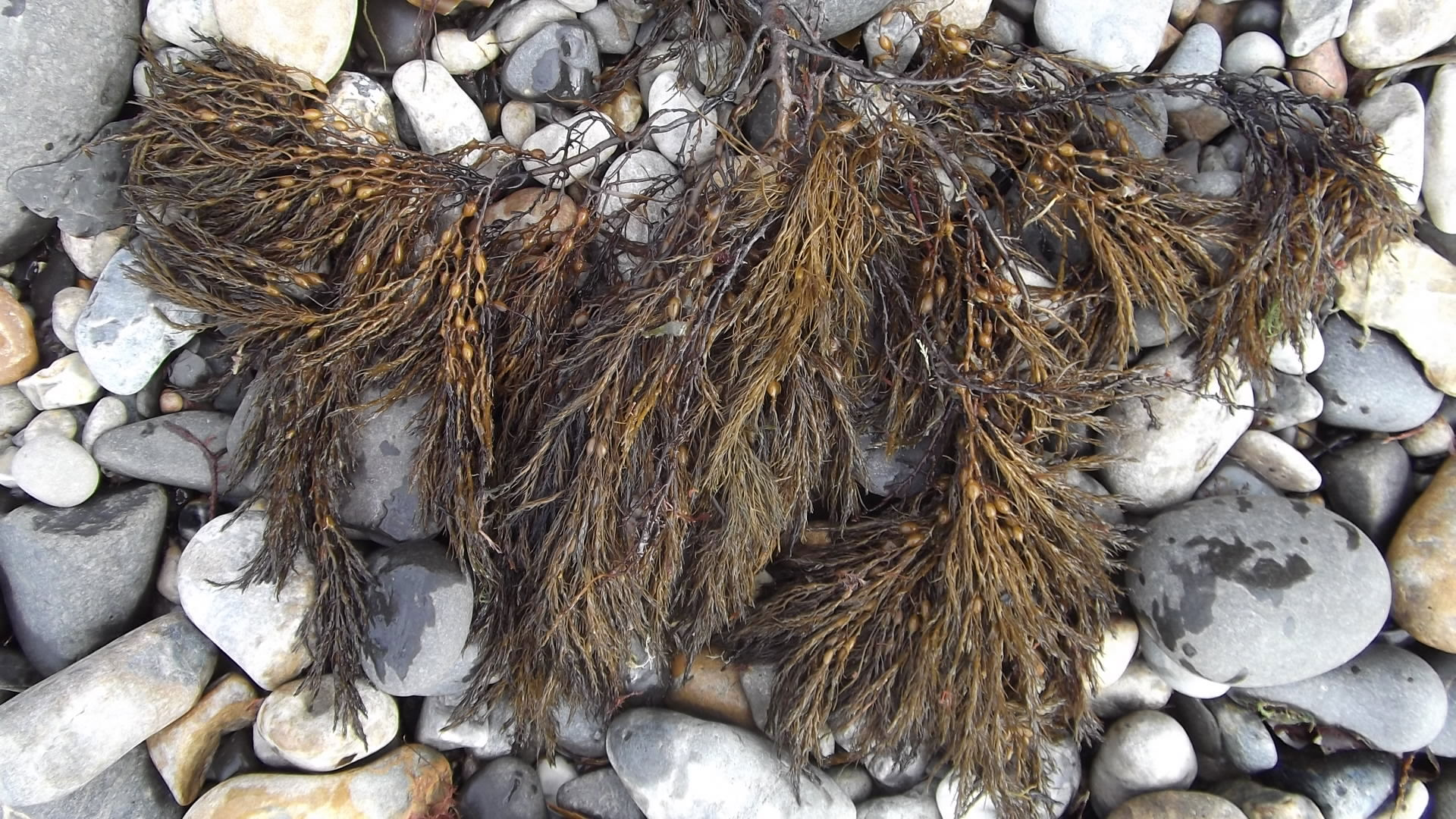

Scientific classification
- Domain: Eukaryota
- Clade: Sar
- Clade: Stramenopiles
- Division: Ochrophyta
- Class: Phaeophyceae
- Order: Fucales
- Family: Sargassaceae
- Genus: Gongolaria
- Species: G. baccata

Binomial name
- Gongolaria baccata (S.G.Gmelin) Molinari & Guiry, 2020

Synonyms
- Fucus baccatus S.G.Gmelin, 1768; Fucus abrotanoides S.G.Gmelin 1768; Fucus fibrosus Hudson, 1778; Cystoseira fibrosa (Hudson) C.Agardh, 1820; Cystoseira thesiophylla Duby 1830; Phyllacantha fibrosa (S.G.Gmelin) Kützing, 1843; Phyllacantha thesiophylla (Duby) Kützing 1860; Cystoseira baccata (Hudson) (S.G.Gmelin) P.C.Silva 1952; Treptacantha baccata (S.G.Gmelin) Orellana & Sansón 2019

= Gongolaria baccata =

Species of seaweed

Gongolaria baccata (syn. Cystoseira baccata) is a species of brown seaweed in the family Fucaceae. It is found in the north east Atlantic, the Baltic Sea and the Mediterranean Sea. The species name baccata means "berry-like" and refers to the small air bladders.

== Taxonomy ==
This species was known as Cystoseira fibrosa until 1950, when P.C.Silva pointed out that it had first been described in 1768 by S.G.Gmelin, who had found the lectotype in the Netherlands and called it Fucus baccatus. His original material cannot now be found but his illustration serves to identify this species. This species was recently found to not belong in Cystoseira, and was moved to the genus Gongolaria along with related species.

== Description ==
Gongolaria baccata is a tough, leathery seaweed of a yellowish or brownish colour. It is a perennial, each year growing new branches up to 50 cm long from a dark brown, cone-shaped base. The main axis is flattened and has a cross section of 1 cm x 0.5 cm. The side branches are alternate and cylindrical, being arranged in a pinnate fashion. The smallest branches are fine and wiry. There are small, lemon-shaped aerocysts or air bladders on the smaller branches. Usually these are single but sometimes there are several in a chain. When the lateral branches are shed in the winter, the base of the main axis can be seen to have a zigzag shape caused by the deciduous primary laterals. The receptacles are terminal, up to 5 cm long, cylindrical with knot-like swellings and covered with tiny threads. In the spring when new lateral shoots grow there are few if any aerocysts. By the autumn they are more numerous and noticeable.

== Distribution and habitat ==
Gongolaria baccata occurs from the Baltic Sea south to the Mediterranean Sea, the Canary Islands, Mauritania and Western Sahara. It is commonest in France and Spain, and in the British Isles it is mostly found in the Channel Islands, the south coast of England and the west coast of Ireland. It is usually found on the lower shore and the sublittoral zone attached to rocks or higher up the shore in deep pools with sandy bases.

== Biology ==
The conceptacles of G. baccata are specialised reproductive cavities and form in the receptacles which are fertile from June until the autumn. Inside the conceptacles are antheridial hairs on which the antheridia or male gametes develop. About forty oospheres or female gametes also develop in each conceptacle. The antheridia are liberated first through a pore called the ostiole and accumulate around it in an orange mound. The ripe oospheres are then liberated and are fertilised externally. They become more rounded and sink to the sea floor where segmentation starts within a few hours. Four primary rhizoids develop from each and the lateral branches soon begin to grow.
