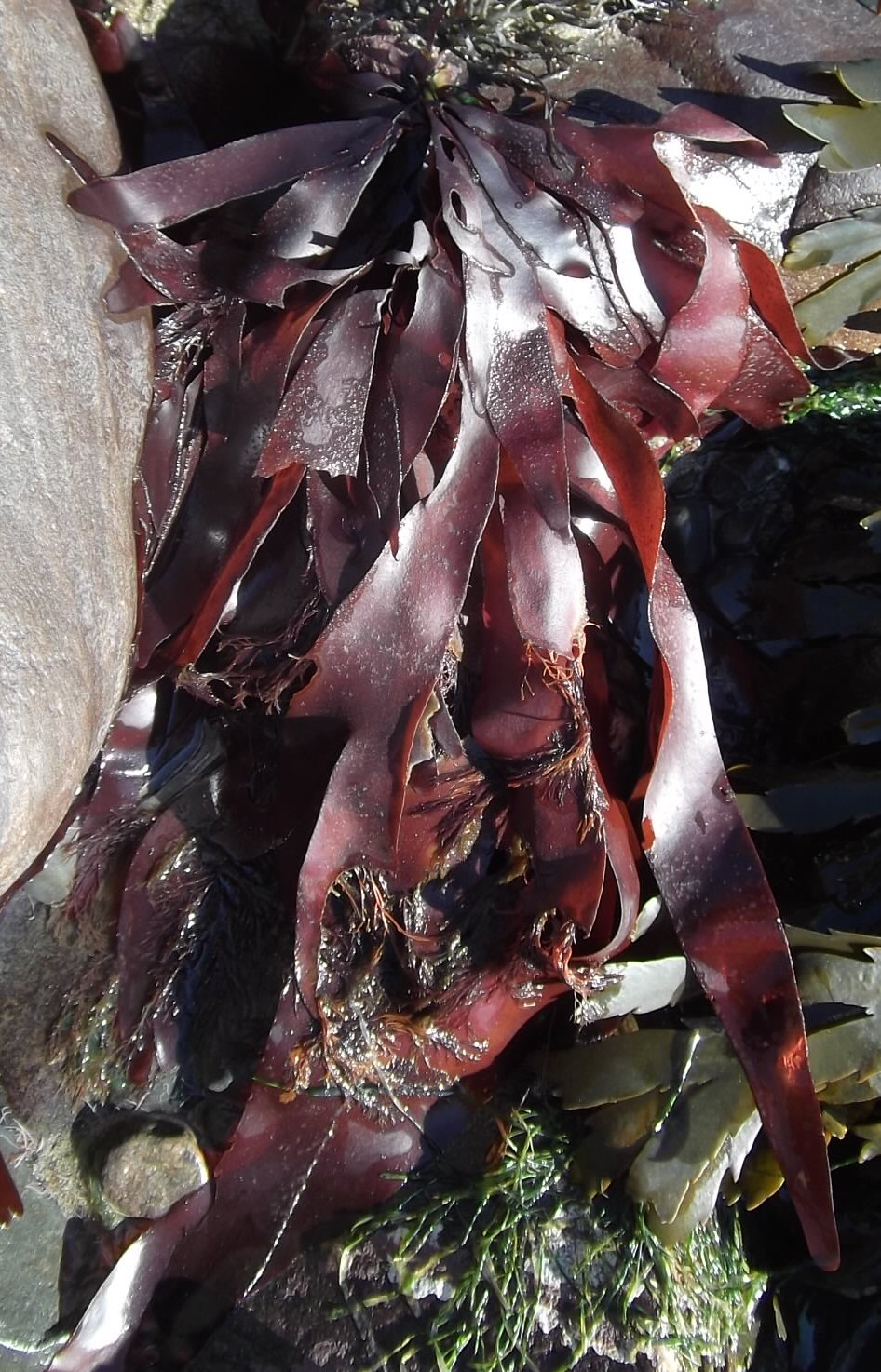

Scientific classification
- Domain: Eukaryota
- Supergroup: Archaeplastida
- Division: Rhodophyta
- Class: Florideophyceae
- Order: Palmariales
- Family: Palmariaceae
- Genus: Palmaria
- Species: P. palmata

Binomial name
- Palmaria palmata (L.) F.Weber & D.Mohr
- Distribution of P. palmata (orange)

Synonyms
- List of synonyms: Ceramium palmatum (Linnaeus) Stackhouse, 1797; Delesseria palmata (Linnaeus) J.V.Lamouroux, 1813; Delesseria sobolifera (M.Vahl) J.V.Lamouroux, 1813; Fucus bullatus O.F.Müller, 1777; Fucus caprinus (Gunnerus) Vahl, 1794; Fucus delicatulus (Gunnerus) Vahl, 1797; Fucus dulcis S.G.Gmelin, 1768; Fucus foliaceus Ström, 1788; Fucus ovinus Gunnerus, 1766; Fucus palmatus Linnaeus, 1753; Fucus rubens Esper, 1799; Fucus rubescens Sommerfelt, 1826; Fucus sarniensis Roth, 1806; Fucus soboliferus M.Vahl, 1792; Halymenia palmata (Linnaeus) C.Agardh, 1817; Halymenia sobolifera (M.Vahl) C.Agardh, 1817; Palmaria expansa Stackhouse, 1809; Palmaria lanceolata Stackhouse, 1809; Rhodymenia palmata (Linnaeus) Greville, 1830; Rhodymenia sobolifera (M.Vahl) Greville, 1830; Sphaerococcus palmatus (Linnaeus) Wahlenberg, 1826; Sphaerococcus sarniensis (Roth) C.Agardh, 1817; Sphaerococcus soboliferus (M.Vahl) Kützing, 1843; Ulva caprina Gunnerus, 1772; Ulva delicatula Gunnerus, 1772; Ulva palmata (Linnaeus) Withering, 1796; Ulva sobolifera (M.Vahl) Lyngbye, 1819

= Palmaria palmata =

Species of edible alga

Palmaria palmata, also called dulse, dillisk or dilsk (from Irish/Scottish Gaelic duileasc/duileasg), red dulse, sea lettuce flakes, or creathnach, is a red alga (Rhodophyta) previously referred to as Rhodymenia palmata. It grows on the northern coasts of the Atlantic and Pacific Oceans. It is a well-known snack food. In Iceland, where it is known as söl [ˈsœːl̥], it has been an important source of dietary fibre throughout the centuries.

== History ==
5th century laws of archaic Ireland existed concerning eating duileasc. The 7th-8th century text Críth Gablach stated that any traveler calling at a person's home was legally entitled to a baseline of hospitality, which included a serving of dulse, and also stating that a rock with a crop of dulse was as valuable as three cows. According to Kieran Sloan, an Irish restaurant manager, dulse was commonly eaten as a snack during The Troubles.

Dulse was also highly praised in archaic Irish times, with a verse in the tale Cath Fionntrá praising:

Iascach mara muiride / a críchaib Baí is Béire, / medbán Faíde firglaine / duileasc a cuanaib Cléire

(sea-fishing of the sea from the regions of Dursey and Beara, laver of truly clean Whiddy, dulse from the inlets of Cape Clear).

— Cath Fionntrá

== Description ==
The erect frond of dulse grows attached by its discoid holdfast and a short inconspicuous stipe epiphytically on to the stipe of Laminaria or to rocks. The fronds are variable in shape and colour from deep rose to reddish purple and are rather leathery in texture. The flat foliose blade gradually expands and divides into broad segments ranging in size to 50 centimetres (20 in) long and 3–8 cm (1–3 in) in width which can bear flat, wedge-shaped proliferations from the edge. The blade consists of an outer cortex of small cells enclosing a medulla of larger cells up to 0.35 thick.

The reference to Rhodymenia palmata var. mollis in Abbott and Hollenberg (1976), is now considered to refer to a different species: Palmaria mollis (Setchel et Gardner) van der Meer et Bird.

Dulse is similar to another seaweed, Dilsea carnosa, but Dilsea is more leathery with blades up to 30 cm (12 in) long and 20 cm (8 in) wide. Unlike P. palmata, it is not branched and does not have proliferations or branches from the edge of the frond, although the older blades may split.

== Life history ==
The full haplodiploid life history was not fully explained until 1980. There are two phases in the life-history, with a haploid phase that is dioecious, with separate male and female plants. The large haploid plants are male, having sporangia. Spermatial sori occur scattered over most of the frond of the haploid male plant. The male plants are blade-like and produce spermatia which fertilize the carpogonia of the female crust. The female gametophyte is very small stunted or encrusted, the carpogonia, the female nucleus, apparently occurring as single cells in the young plants. The female plants are minute, less than 1 mm), and after fertilization become overgrown by the resulting diploid plant. Tetraspores occur in scattered patches sori (spores) on the mature diploid blade. The adult tetrasporophyte produces tetraspores meiotically in fours.

== Ecology ==
P. palmata is to be found growing from mid-tide of the intertidal zone (the area between the high tide and low tide) to depths of 20 m or more in sheltered and exposed shores.

== Culinary use ==
Dulse is commonly used as food and medicine in Ireland, Iceland and Atlantic Canada. It can be found in many health food stores or fish markets and can be ordered directly from local distributors. It is also used as fodder for animals in some countries.

Dulse is a good source of minerals and vitamins compared with other vegetables, contains all trace elements needed by humans, and has a high protein content. Dulse contains iodine, which prevents goitre.

It is commonly found from June to September and can be picked by hand when the tide is out. When picked, small snails, shell pieces, and other small particles can be washed or shaken off the plant, which is then spread to dry. Some gatherers may turn it once and roll it into large bales to be packaged later.

Fresh dulse can be eaten directly off the rocks before sun-drying. Sun-dried dulse is eaten as is or is ground to flakes or a powder. When used in cooking, dulse's properties are similar to those of a flavour-enhancer. It can be pan-fried quickly into chips, baked in the oven covered with cheese, with salsa, or simply microwaved briefly. It can be used in soups, chowders, sandwiches, and salads, or added to bread or pizza dough. Finely diced, it can be used as a flavour enhancer in meat dishes, such as chili, in place of monosodium glutamate.

In Ireland dulse can be used to make "White Soda Bread". In Ballycastle, Northern Ireland, it is traditionally sold at the Ould Lammas Fair. It is particularly popular along the Causeway Coast. Many gather their own dulse. Along the Ulster coastline from County Down to County Donegal, it is eaten dried and uncooked as a snack. It is commonly referred to as dillisk on the west coast of Ireland. Dillisk is usually dried and sold as a snack food from stalls in seaside towns by periwinkle sellers.

== Distribution ==
P. palmata is the only species of Palmaria found on the coast of Atlantic Europe. It can be found from Portugal to the Baltic Sea coasts and on the coasts of Iceland and the Faroe Islands. It also grows on the shores of Arctic Russia, Arctic Canada, Atlantic Canada, Alaska, Japan, and Korea. Records of P. palmaria from California are actually of Palmaria mollis.

== Parasites and diseases ==
Galls, possibly produced by parasitic nematodes, copepods or bacteria, are known to infect these plants. They were recorded as "outgrowths of tissue produced by the presence...of an animal."

== Gallery ==
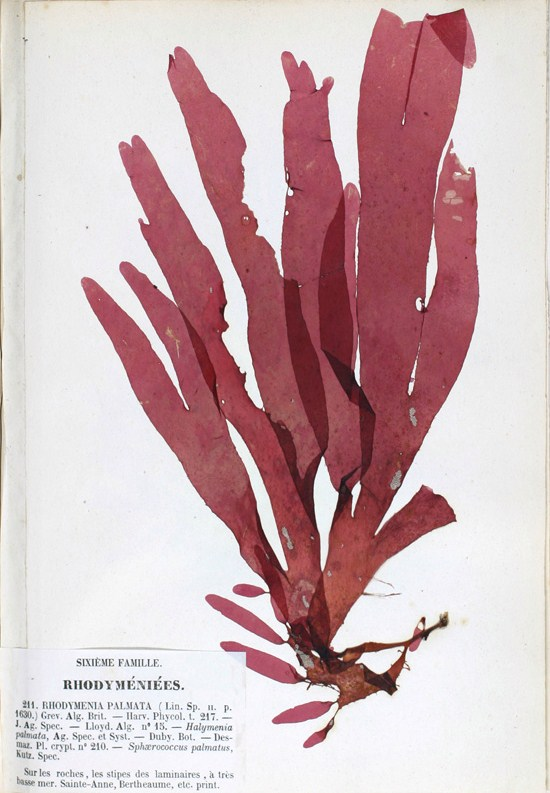
Botanical imagery

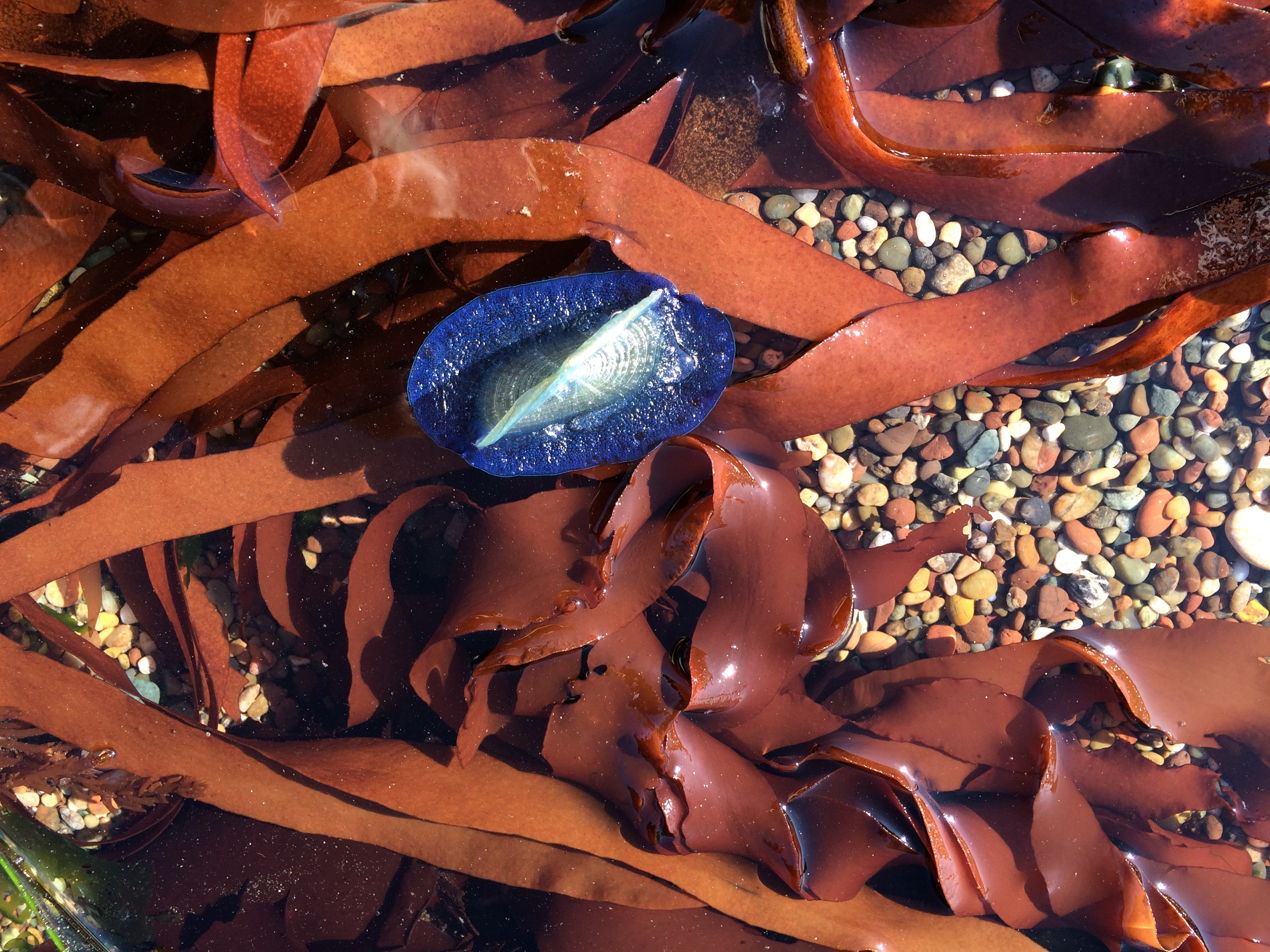
Velella velella & Palmaria palmata

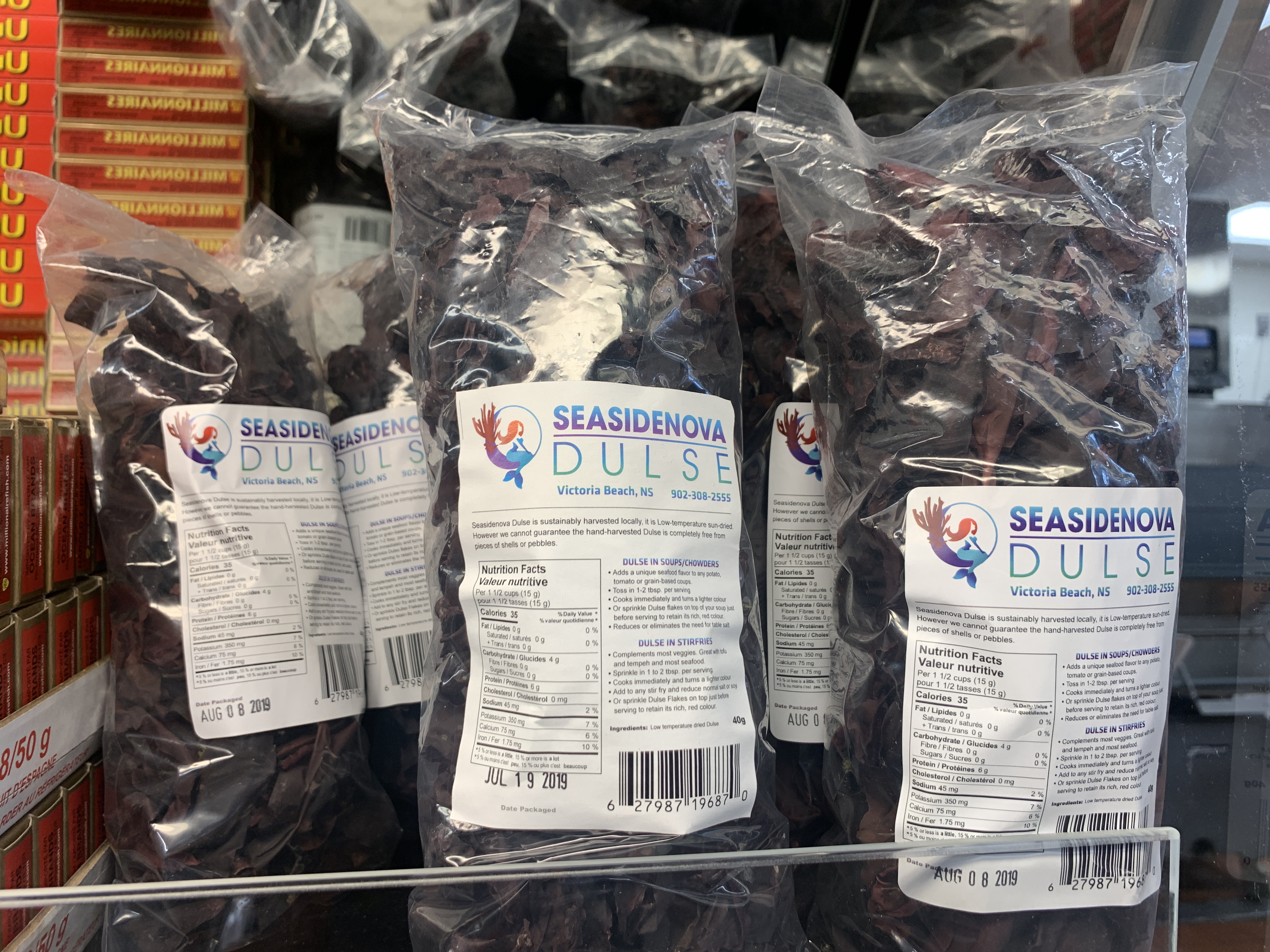
Dulse being sold in the bags

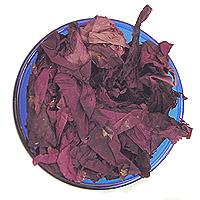
Dried dulse
