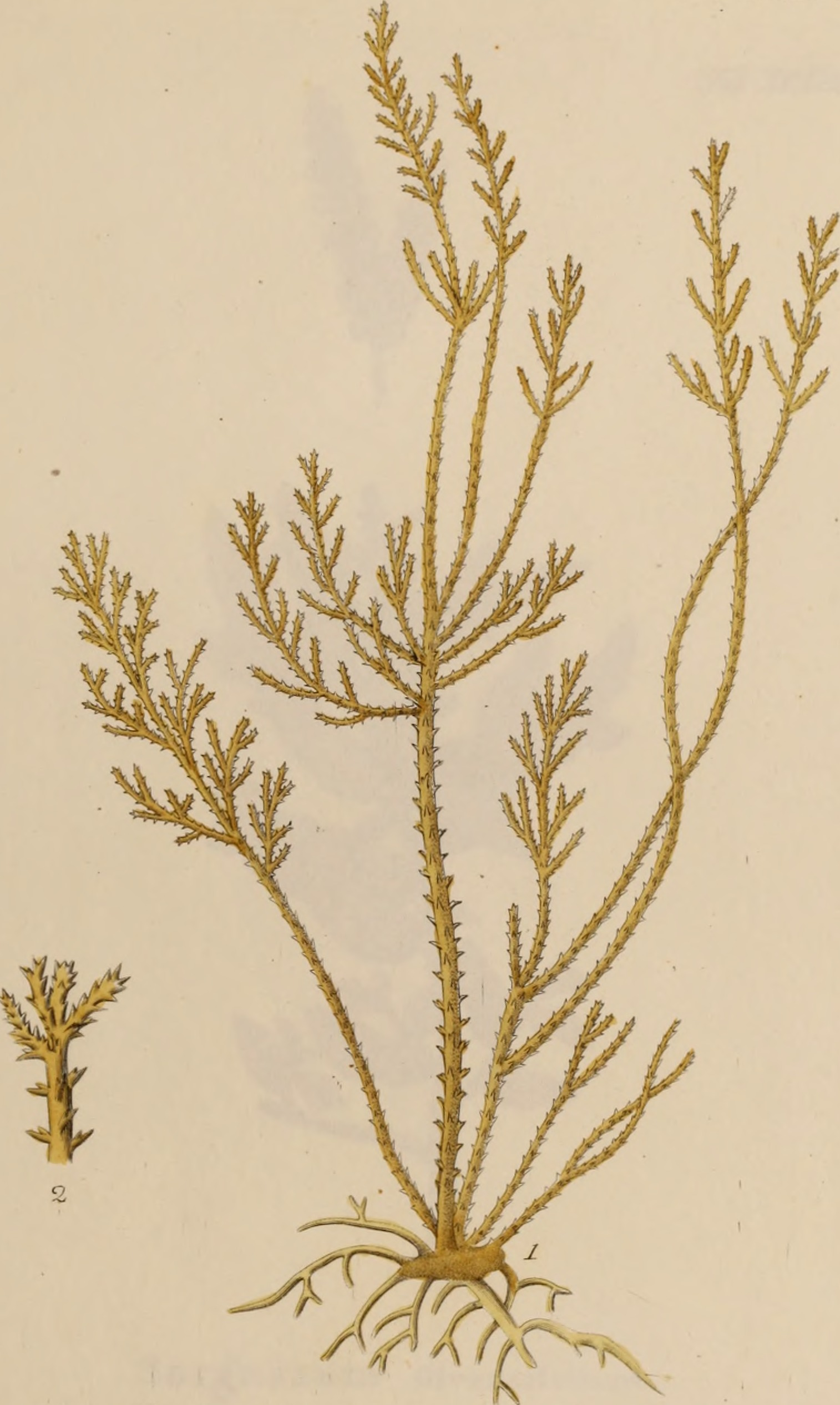
- Cystoseira foeniculacea f. schiffneri

Scientific classification
- Domain: Eukaryota
- Clade: Sar
- Clade: Stramenopiles
- Phylum: Ochrophyta
- Class: Phaeophyceae
- Order: Fucales
- Family: Sargassaceae
- Genus: Cystoseira
- Species: C. foeniculacea

Binomial name
- Cystoseira foeniculacea (L.) Grev.

Synonyms
- Cystoseira abrotanifolia (L.) C.Agardh; Cystoseira concatenata (L.) C.Agardh; Cystoseira discors (L.) C.Agardh; Cystoseira ercegovicii Giaccone; Fucus abrotanifolius L.; Fucus barbatus L.; Fucus concatenatus L.; Fucus foeniculaceus L.; Fucus discors L.; Phyllacantha concatenata (L.) Kützing

= Cystoseira foeniculacea =

Species of alga

Cystoseira foeniculacea is a species of brown alga in the genus Cystoseira.

== Description ==
Cystoseira foeniculacea forms tufts up to 30 centimetres (12 in) long, attached to the substrate with a broad disc-shaped holdfast. It has many cryptostomata, and conceptacles that may be male, female or both. Up to 12 oogonia may develop in each conceptacle. The proximity of the oogonia and the antheridia strongly suggest that C. foeniculacea self-fertilises.

== Distribution ==
Cystoseira foeniculacea is found in the mid-littoral zone and in other sheltered places, from the British Isles to Senegal, and in the Mediterranean Sea.

== Taxonomy ==
Cystoseira foeniculacea was first described by Carl Linnaeus in his seminal 1753 work Species Plantarum, under the name "Fucus foeniculaceus". Three other species described by Linnaeus were also later determined to refer to the same species by Dawson Turner, who chose the epithet "foeniculacea" as the valid name (under the "principle of the first reviser"). The vernacular name "bushy feather wrack" has been proposed for this species.
