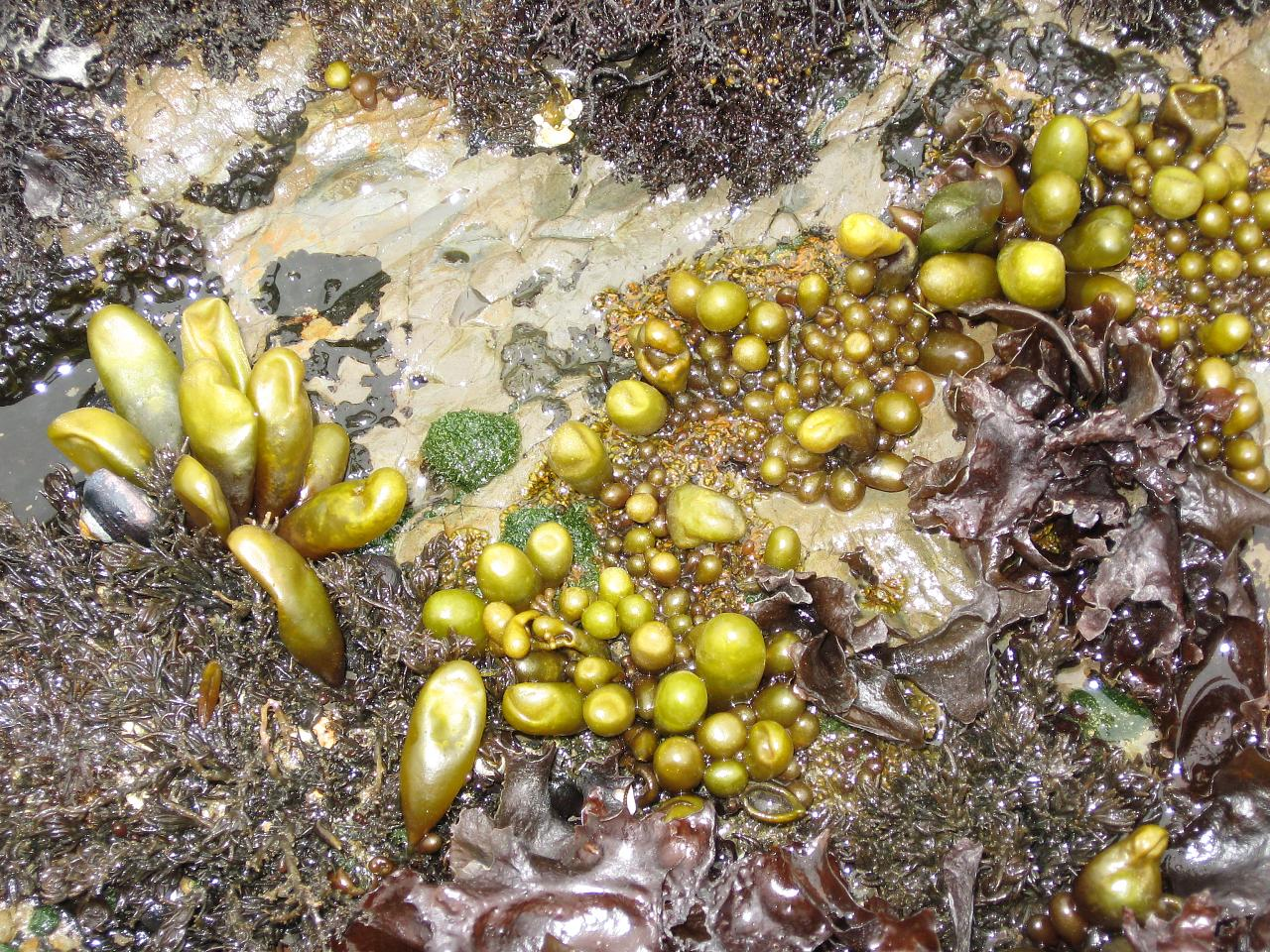
- Sea grapes (Halosaccion glandiforme), found at Fitzgerald Marine Reserve, Moss Beach, California

Scientific classification
- Clade: Archaeplastida
- Division: Rhodophyta
- Class: Florideophyceae
- Order: Palmariales
- Family: Palmariaceae; Guiry, 1974

Genera
- Devaleraea Guiry, 1982; Halosaccion Kützing, 1843; Neohalosacciocolax I.K.Lee & Kurogi, 1978; Palmaria Stackhouse, 1802

= Palmariaceae =

Family of algae

Palmariaceae is a family of algae. It includes the edible seaweed dulse (Palmaria palmata).
