= Cystoseira pustulata =

Scientific classification
- Domain: Eukaryota
- Supergroup: Stramenopiles
- Division: Ochrophyta
- Class: Phaeophyceae
- Order: Fucales
- Family: Sargassaceae
- Genus: Cystoseira
- Species: C. pustulata

Binomial name
- Cystoseira pustulata (Ercegovic) Neiva & Serrão 2022

Synonyms
- Cystoseira abrotanifolia subsp. pustulata Ercegovic, 1952; Cystoseira compressa subsp. pustulata (Ercegovic) Verlaque 2015; Cystoseira compressa var. pustulata Ercegovic ex Verlaque 1988

Species of alga

Cystoseira pustulata is a species of brown alga in the genus Cystoseira.

== Distribution ==
Cystoseira pustulata occurs in the Mediterranean and Northeast Atlantic (Azores, Canary Islands). Records of Cystoseira humilis in the Mediterranean refer to this species.

== Taxonomy ==
Cystoseira pustulata has variously been treated as a variety or subspecies of Cystoseira compressa, or considered a synonym of C. humilis, but constitutes a distinct genetic entity not closely related to either.
