= St Patrick's Rock (disambiguation) =

St Patrick's Rock is a rock close to the Erskine Bridge in the River Clyde, Scotland.

St Patrick's Rock may also refer to;

- Rock of Cashel, a historical site in Cashel, County Tipperary, Ireland
- St Patrick's Bridge § St Patrick's Rock, a rock in the Celtic Sea near St Patrick's Bridge
