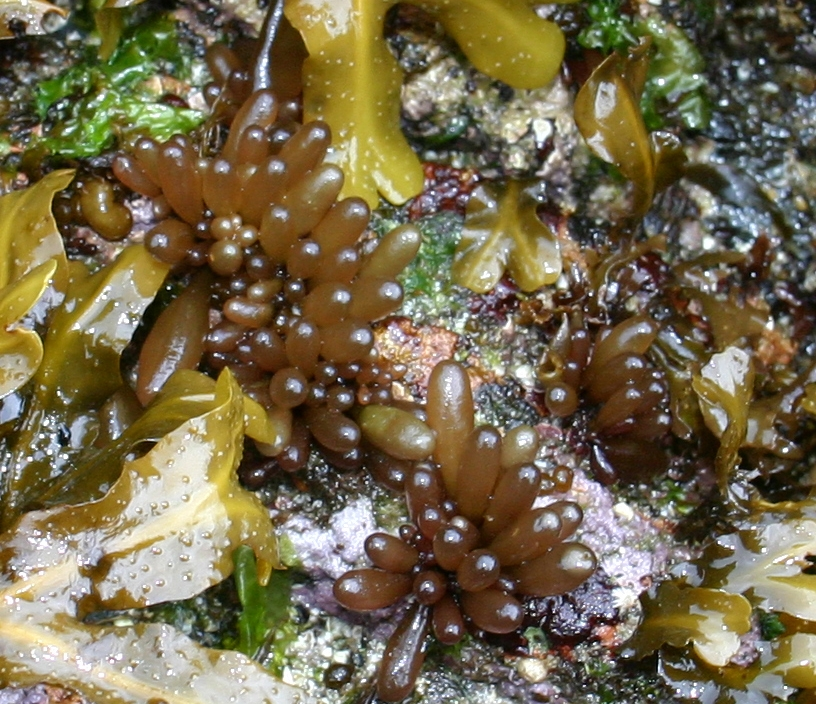

Scientific classification
- Clade: Archaeplastida
- Division: Rhodophyta
- Class: Florideophyceae
- Order: Palmariales
- Family: Palmariaceae
- Genus: Halosaccion
- Species: H. glandiforme

Binomial name
- Halosaccion glandiforme (S.G.Gmelin) Ruprecht, 1850

Synonyms
- Dumontia decapitata Postels & Ruprecht, 1841; Dumontia fucicola Postels & Ruprecht, 1840; Dumontia hydrophora Postels & Ruprecht, 1840; Halosaccion decapitatum (Postels & Ruprecht) Ruprecht, 1850; Halosaccion fucicola (Postels & Ruprecht) Kützing, 1843; Halosaccion hydrophorum (Postels & Ruprecht) Kützing, 1843; Ulva glandiformis S.G.Gmelin, 1768

= Halosaccion glandiforme =

Species of alga

Halosaccion glandiforme, also known as sea sacs or sea grapes, is a species of red algae.

It was first described to science by S. G. Gmelin in 1768, in what is arguably the first book to focus on marine biology, Historia Fucorum. Franz Josef Ruprecht is responsible for the current taxonomic description. The type specimen was collected in Kamchatka, Russia.

== Description ==
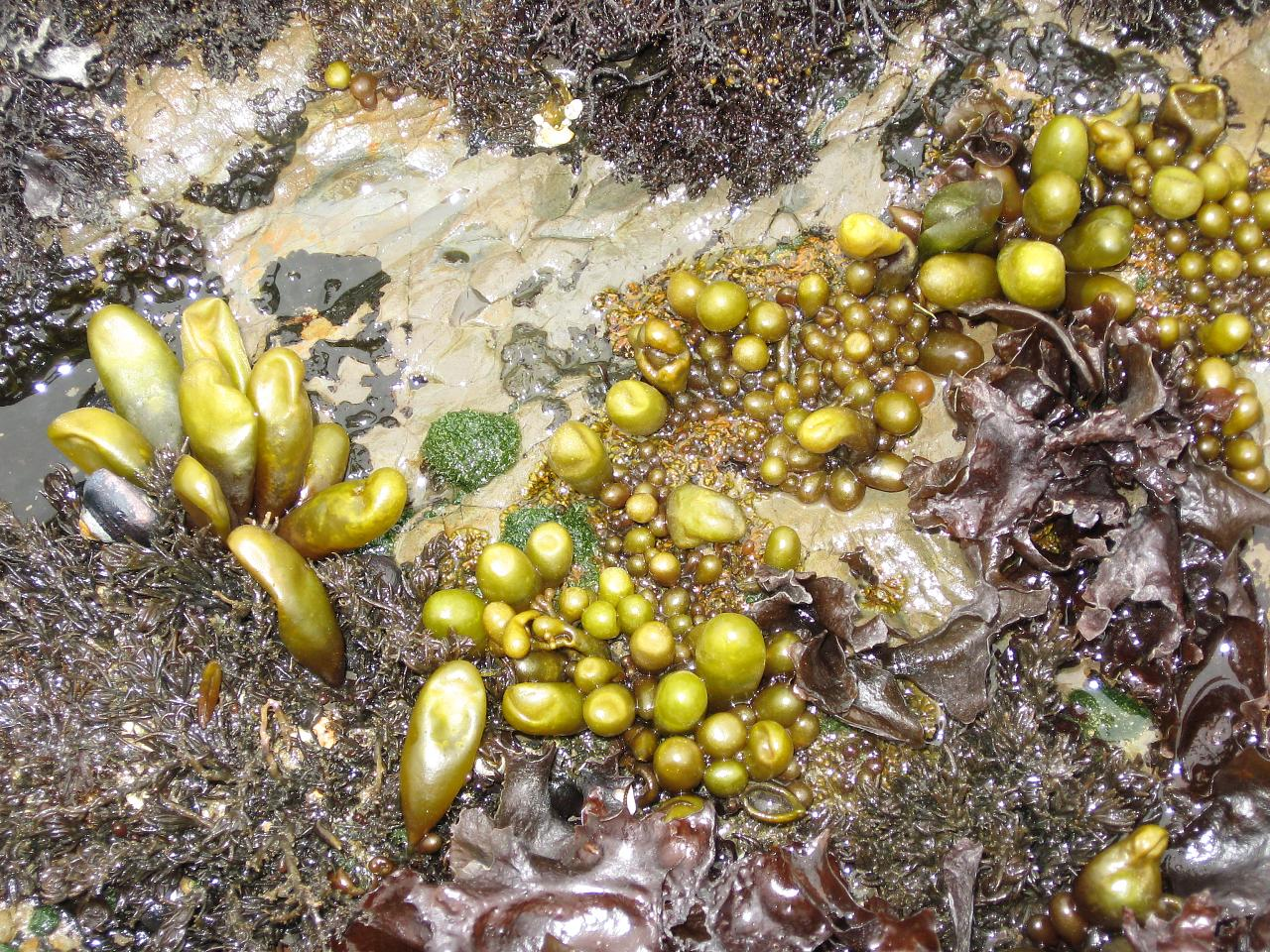
Halosaccion glandiforme, Fitzgerald Marine Reserve, Calif.

The thallus, or body, of this algae is a hollow, torpedo-shaped sac. This ellipsoid shape has low drag through the water allowing the algae to inhabit areas with significant wave and current energy. The sac is reddish-purple to yellowish-brown in color. It can be as long as 15 centimetres (5.9 in), but is usually shorter. The sac can be up to 4 centimetres (1.6 in) in diameter. The sac wall is up to 400 micrometres (0.016 in) thick.

There are 5 to 15 small pores in the thallus that allow sea water into and out of the sac. These pores are 10 micrometres (0.00039 in) to 100 micrometres (0.0039 in) in diameter. When submerged, the elasticity of the sac walls draws water into the thallus through the pores. Rapid photosynthesis produces a small oxygen bubble inside the sac which holds it toward the surface and the energy of the sun.

The sac tapers to a short stipe, or stem, that connects to a small, disc-shaped holdfast which anchors the algae to the bottom. The stipe is relatively weak, but sufficient to anchor the algae given the low drag of the thallus.

When the tide goes out, the algae desiccates in the open air. Water from the sac leaks out of the pores, keeping the thallus cool and moist. As the water leaks away, the sac deflates and may appear flattened. While a deflated sac will perish in the sun within three hours, sacs that are water-filled when the tide goes out remain moist and cool, surviving until the next tide covers them. Older sea sacs sometimes have their tips abraded away, leaving them without their internal supply of water.

== Distribution and habitat ==
Sea sacs are widely distributed in the north Pacific Ocean. The species is found from the Russian Far East to the Bering and Chukchi Seas, the Aleutian Islands, mainland Alaska and south along the coast of North America to Point Conception, California. Sea sacs are found in Puget Sound. This is a shallow water species growing in the low to middle intertidal zone. It usually grows on rock, showing a very marked preference for the rough, exposed points of rock rather than the cracks and valleys in rock. It may also grow on algae, including Corallina vancouveriensis and Neorhodomela larix. It will grow in areas that are exposed to waves and in semi-protected areas.

== Life history ==
This algae is an annual, appearing in the Spring and degenerating in the Fall. It has a complex reproductive strategy. The obvious sea sacs that are seen in the intertidal zone are a mix of male gametophytes and asexual tetrasporophytes. They appear to be identical, but close examination reveals the thalli of the tetrasporophytes to be dotted with the red tetraspores. The female gametophyte is microscopic and unlikely to be noticed outside of a laboratory.

The reproductive cycle of sea sacs proceeds as follows:

1. The mature male gamtophyte produces its gametes, spermatia, on the surface of its thallus. These are released into the sea in strands of mucus in summer. The mature female gametophore has a carpogonium containing its genetic material and two hair-like trichogynes, which capture the sprematia prior to fertilization. Given the almost immediate maturity of the female, and the over-wintering of the male gametophore, females are fertilized by the previous generation's males. Once fertilized, the zygote develops into a small disc that grows into the asexual tetrasporophyte at the start of the next spring.
2. The tetrasporophyte has spore producing bodies, sporangia, on the surface of its thallus. Each sporangia produces four spores through meiosis. The spores are released in summer. When these spores germinate, they become two male and two female gametophytes. The males divide repeatedly, each creating a disc from which a new male sea sac will mature at the start of the next spring. The female gametophytes mature very rapidly, within 24 hours of germination.

Sea sacs generate all their energy from photosynthesis. They are eaten by limpets and the black turban snail, Tegula funebralis. They are edible by humans, either raw or in soups. Small amphipods may chew their way into a sac and live there, safe from predators.
