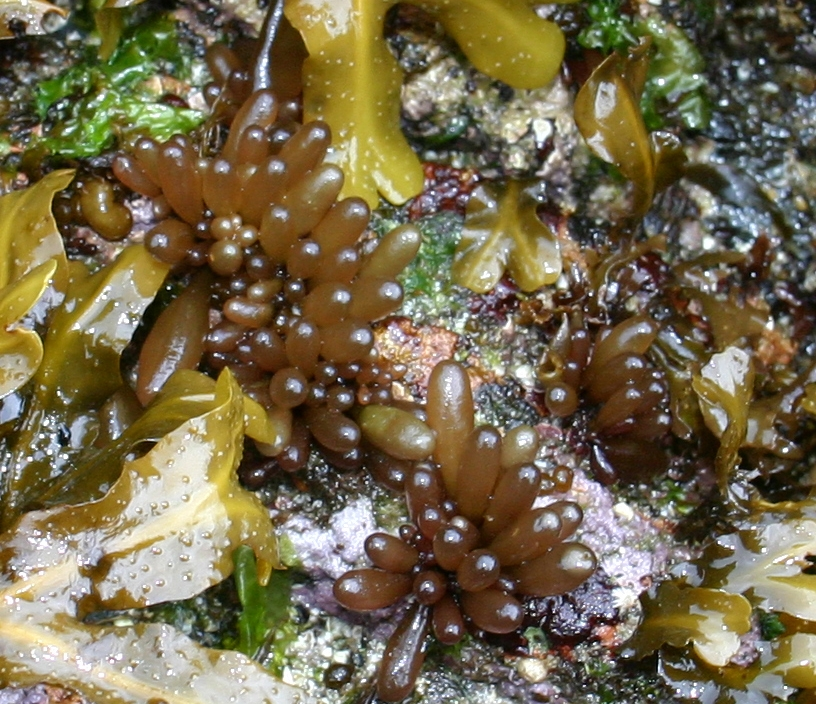
- Halosaccion glandiforme

Scientific classification
- Domain: Eukaryota
- Clade: Archaeplastida
- Division: Rhodophyta
- Class: Florideophyceae
- Order: Palmariales
- Family: Palmariaceae
- Genus: Halosaccion; Kützing, 1843

= Halosaccion =

Genus of algae

Halosaccion is a genus of red algae belonging to the family Palmariaceae.

The species of this genus are found in Northern Hemisphere.

== Species ==
Species:

- Halosaccion americanum
- Halosaccion glandiforme (S.G.Gmelin) Ruprecht
- Halosaccion hydrophora (Postels & Ruprecht) Kuetzin
- Halosaccion pubescens Foslie
- Halosaccion saccatum
- Halosaccion tilesi
