= Ericaria =

Scientific classification
- Domain: Eukaryota
- Clade: Diaphoretickes
- Clade: SAR
- Clade: Stramenopiles
- Phylum: Gyrista
- Subphylum: Ochrophytina
- Class: Phaeophyceae
- Order: Fucales
- Family: Sargassaceae
- Genus: Ericaria; Stackhouse, 1809

Species
- See text

Genus of seaweeds

Ericaria is a genus of brown algae in the family Sargassaceae. It was formerly included in Cystoseira, but was recently found not to be closely related to it.

== Species ==
The following species are listed in AlgaeBase:

- Ericaria amentacea (C.Agardh) Molinari & Guiry
- Ericaria balearica (Sauvageau) Neiva, Ballesteros & Serrão
- Ericaria barbatula (Kützing) Molinari & Guiry
- Ericaria bosphorica (Sauvageau) D.Serio & G.Furnari
- Ericaria brachycarpa (J.Agardh) Molinari & Guiry
- Ericaria corniculata (Turner) Neiva & Serrão
- Ericaria crinita (Duby) Molinari & Guiry
- Ericaria dubia (Valiante) Neiva & Serrão
- Ericaria funkii (Gerloff & Nizamuddin) Molinari & Guiry
- Ericaria giacconei D.Serio & G.Furnari
- Ericaria mediterranea (Sauvageau) Molinari & Guiry
- Ericaria sedoides (Desfontaines) Neiva & Serrão
- Ericaria selaginoides (Linnaeus) Molinari & Guiry
- Ericaria selago Stackhouse
- Ericaria tamarisca Stackhouse
- Ericaria zosteroides (C.Agardh) Molinari & Guiry
