= Stolonophora =

Scientific classification
- Domain: Eukaryota
- Clade: Sar
- Clade: Stramenopiles
- Phylum: Ochrophyta
- Class: Phaeophyceae
- Order: Fucales
- Family: Sargassaceae
- Genus: Stolonophora; M.Nizamuddin 1969
- Species: S. brandegeei

Binomial name
- Stolonophora brandegeei (Setchell & N.L.Gardner) M.Nizamuddin 1969

Synonyms
- Blossevillea brandegeei Setchell & N.L.Gardner 1913; Cystophora brandegeei (Setchell & N.L.Gardner) Dawson 1953; Platythalia brandegeei (Setchell & N.L.Gardner) Womersley 1964

Species of Phaeophyceae

Stolonophora brandegeei is a species of marine brown algae in the family Sargassaceae, and the only species presently recognised in the genus Stolonophora.

== Distribution ==
Stolonophora brandegeei is endemic to Isla Guadalupe in Mexico.
