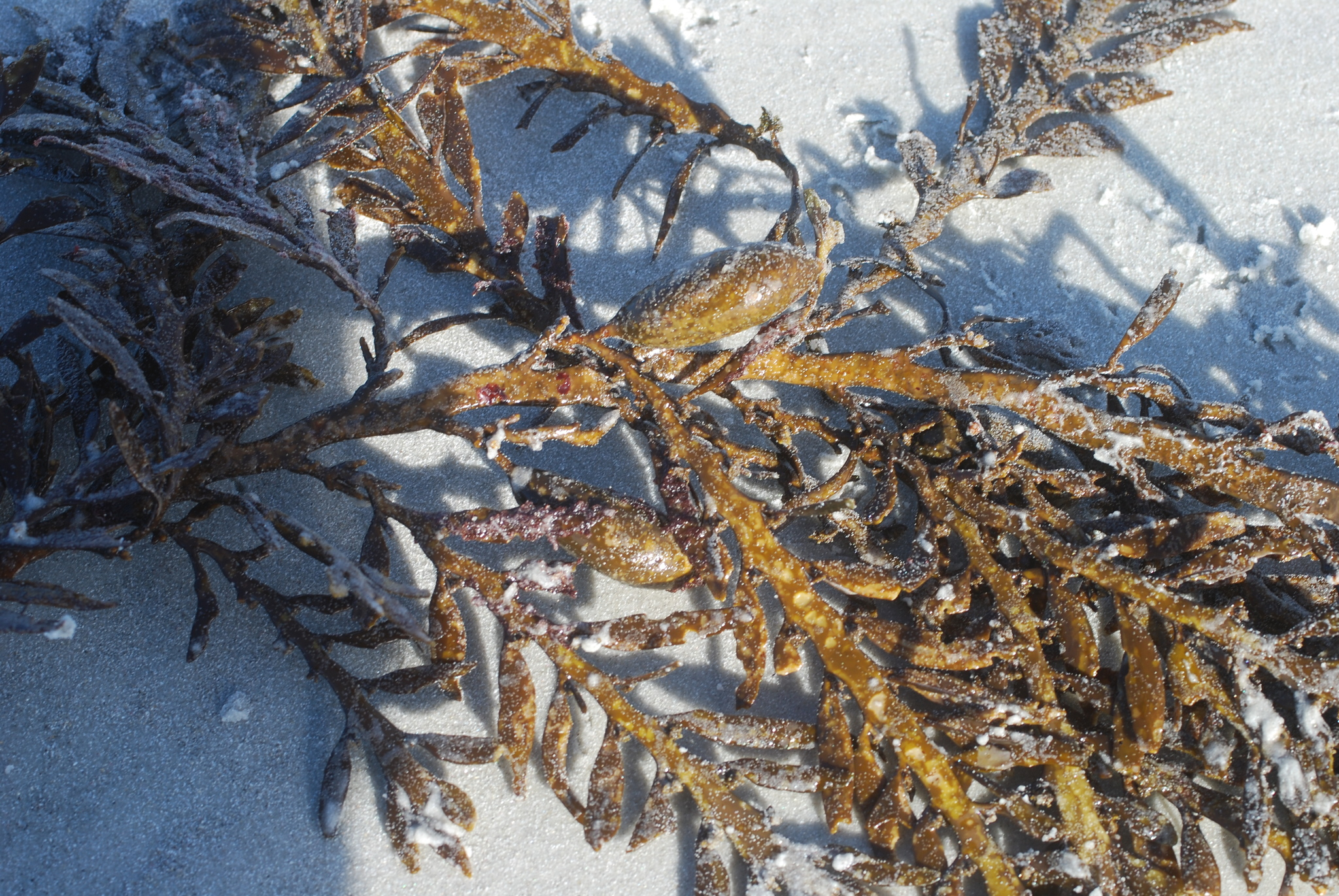

Scientific classification
- Domain: Eukaryota
- Clade: Diaphoretickes
- Clade: SAR
- Clade: Stramenopiles
- Phylum: Gyrista
- Subphylum: Ochrophytina
- Class: Phaeophyceae
- Order: Fucales
- Family: Sargassaceae
- Genus: Carpophyllum
- Species: C. maschalocarpum

Binomial name
- Carpophyllum maschalocarpum (Turner) Grev., 1830

= Carpophyllum maschalocarpum =

Species of seaweed

Carpophyllum maschalocarpum, commonly known as the common flapjack, is a brown alga that grows in crevices of rocks at low tide levels. It is a common alga in New Zealand and is endemic.

== Description ==
Carpophyllum maschalocarpum is mid-golden brown in colour and dries black.

== Distribution ==
This species can be found on the shores of the North Island, South Island, and the Chatham Islands.

== Habitat ==
Carpophyllum maschalocarpum is found on rocks at low water in pools and channels forming a distinct zone and especially on vertical rock faces on open coasts.

== Conservation status ==
This species has been classified in 2019 under the New Zealand Threat Classification system as being "Not Threatened ".
