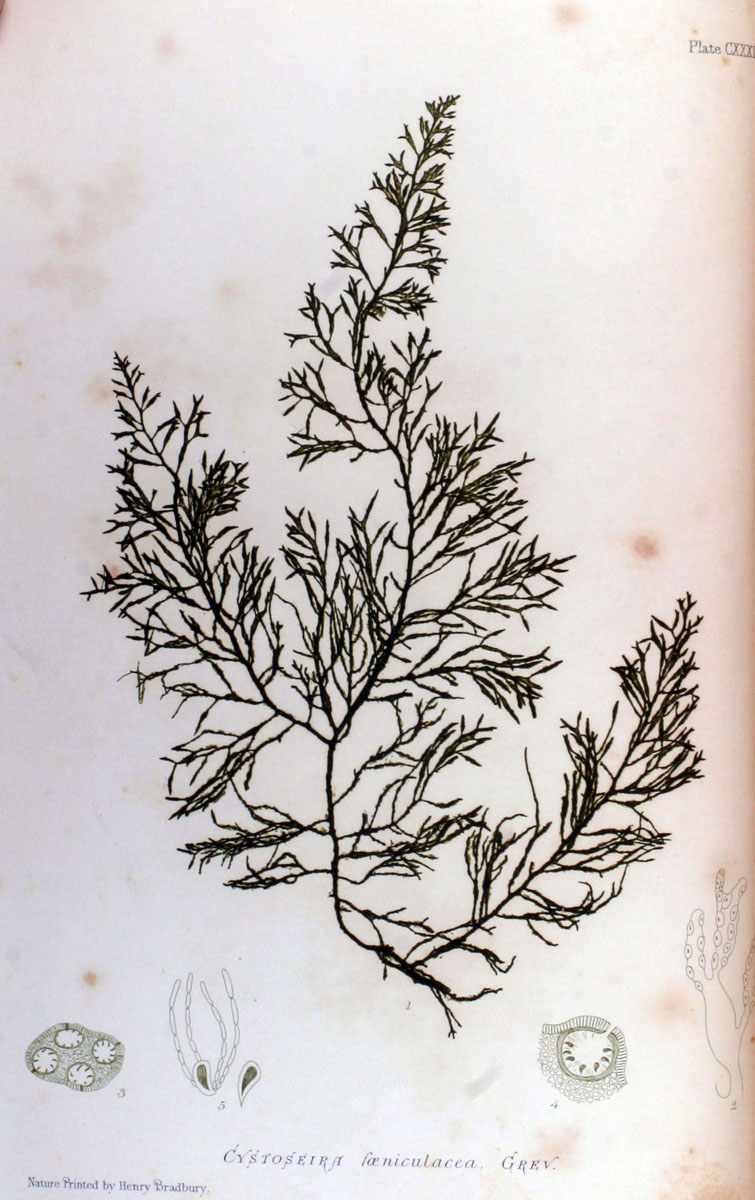
- Cystoseira foeniculacea, the type species of Cystoseira

Scientific classification
- Domain: Eukaryota
- Clade: Sar
- Clade: Stramenopiles
- Division: Ochrophyta
- Class: Phaeophyceae
- Order: Fucales
- Family: Sargassaceae
- Genus: Cystoseira (L.) C.Agardh, 1820

Species
- See text

= Cystoseira =

Genus of seaweeds

Cystoseira is a genus of brown algae in the order Fucales.

== Description ==
As presently defined, Cystoseira comprises fucoids characterised by antherozoids without stigmata, few antheridial branches, trichothallic hairs in conceptacles, large ovoid oospheres, and eggs that remain attached to the surface of the receptacles through mucilaginous stalks until after fertilization.

== Distribution ==
Cystoseira as presently defined occurs only in the Mediterranean and Northeast Atlantic. Species from the Indian and Pacific oceans are presently included in different genera.

== Ecology ==
Cystoseira are important habitat-forming species in coastal waters of the Mediterranean and Northeast Atlantic. They require good water quality, and can be used as bioindicators for pollution levels.

== Species ==
Cystoseira was recently found to include multiple unrelated lineages. As a result, most species were moved to the genera Stephanocystis, Polycladia, Sirophysalis, Gongolaria and Ericaria. As of January 2024, AlgaeBase lists the following non-fossil species as accepted:

- Cystoseira aurantia Kützing, 1843
- Cystoseira compressa (Esper) Gerloff & Nizamuddin, 1975
- Cystoseira crinitophylla Ercegovic, 1952
- Cystoseira flaccida Kützing 1843
- Cystoseira foeniculacea (Linnaeus) Greville, 1830
- Cystoseira humilis Schousboe ex Kützing, 1860
- Cystoseira hypocarpa Kützing 1854
- Cystoseira melanothrix (Kützing) Piccone, 1884
- Cystoseira micheleae Verlaque, Blanfuné, Boudouresque, Thibaut & Sellam, 2017
- Cystoseira pelagosae Ercegovic, 1952
- Cystoseira pustulata (Ercegovic) Neiva & Serrão, 2022
- Cystoseira pycnoclada Schiffner ex Gerloff & Nizamuddin, 1976
- Cystoseira schiffneri G.Hamel, 1939
- Cystoseira selaginoides Naccari 1828
- Cystoseira spicata Ercegovic 1952
- Cystoseira spicigera C.Agardh 1820
- Cystoseira thysigera Postels & Ruprecht 1840
- Cystoseira tophosa Filarszky 1926
- Cystoseira wildpretii Nizamuddin 1995

Many of these species are poorly studied and require validation.
