= Gongolaria =

Scientific classification
- Domain: Eukaryota
- Clade: Sar
- Clade: Stramenopiles
- Phylum: Ochrophyta
- Class: Phaeophyceae
- Order: Fucales
- Family: Sargassaceae
- Genus: Gongolaria; Boehmer, 1760

Species
- See text

Genus of seaweeds

Gongolaria is a genus of brown algae in the family Sargassaceae. It was formerly included in Cystoseira, but was recently found not to be closely related to it.

== Species ==
The following species are listed in AlgaeBase:

- Gongolaria abies-marina (S.G.Gmelin) Kuntze
- Gongolaria algeriensis (Feldmann) Molinari & Guiry
- Gongolaria baccata (S.G.Gmelin, 1768) Molinari & Guiry
- Gongolaria barbata (Stackhouse) Kuntze
- Gongolaria elegans (Sauvageau) Molinari & Guiry
- Gongolaria gibraltarica (Sauvageau) Neiva, Bermejo & Serrão
- Gongolaria mauritanica (Sauvageau) Molinari & Guiry
- Gongolaria montagnei (J.Agardh) Kuntze
- Gongolaria nodicaulis (Withering) Molinari & Guiry
- Gongolaria rayssiae (Ramon) Molinari & Guiry
- Gongolaria sauvageauana (Hamel) Molinari & Guiry
- Gongolaria sonderi (Kützing) Neiva, João Soares & Serrão
- Gongolaria squarrosa (De Notaris) Kuntze
- Gongolaria susanensis (Nizamuddin) Molinari & Guiry
- Gongolaria triquetra (C.Agardh) Kuntze
- Gongolaria usneoides (Linnaeus) Molinari & Guiry
