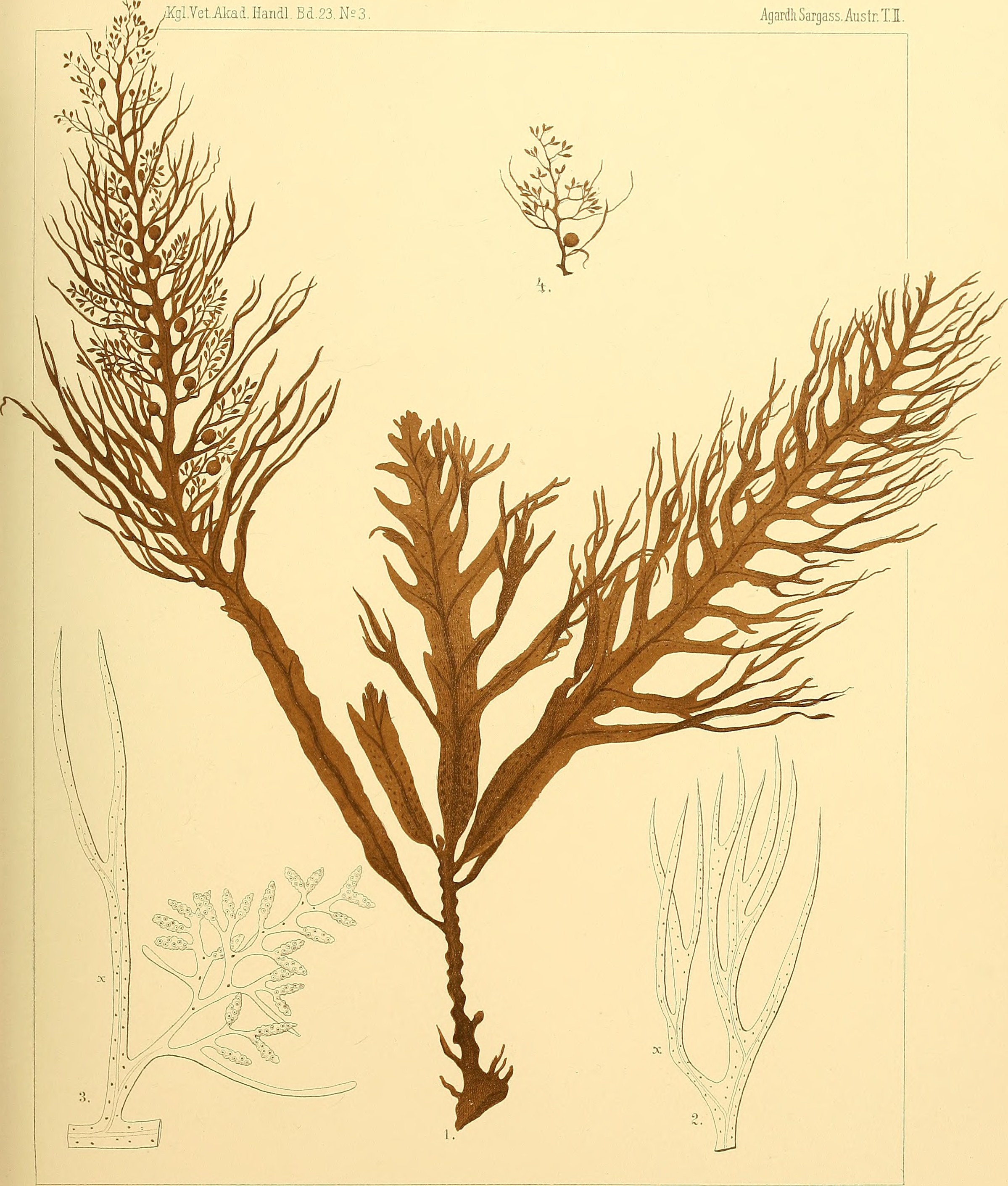

Scientific classification
- Domain: Eukaryota
- Clade: Diaphoretickes
- Clade: SAR
- Clade: Stramenopiles
- Phylum: Gyrista
- Subphylum: Ochrophytina
- Class: Phaeophyceae
- Order: Fucales
- Family: Sargassaceae
- Genus: Sargassopsis; Trevisan, 1843

= Sargassopsis =

Genus of brown algae

Sargassopsis is a genus of brown algae belonging to the family Sargassaceae.

The species of this genus are found in Australia.

Species:

- Sargassopsis decurrens (R.Brown ex Turner) Trevisan, 1843
