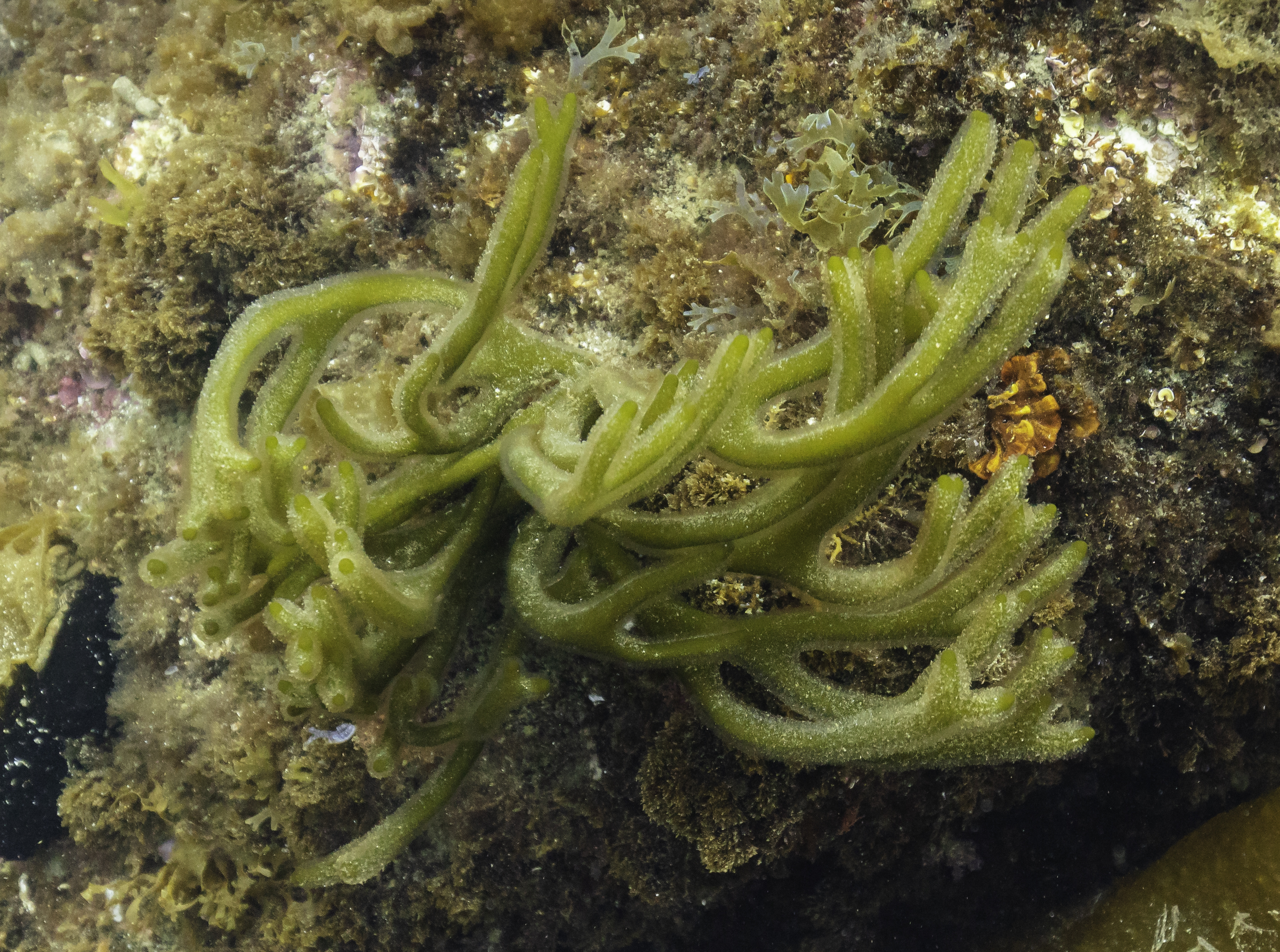

Scientific classification
- Domain: Eukaryota
- Clade: Diaphoretickes
- Clade: SAR
- Clade: Stramenopiles
- Phylum: Gyrista
- Subphylum: Ochrophytina
- Class: Phaeophyceae
- Order: Fucales
- Family: Sargassaceae
- Genus: Bifurcaria; L.

Species
- See text

= Bifurcaria =

Genus of seaweeds

Bifurcaria is a genus of brown algae seaweeds found on rocky North American and European shores and tidepools of the Atlantic Ocean. One species is also found on the shores of the Galapagos Islands in the Pacific Ocean.

== Species ==
- Bifurcaria bifurcata
- Bifurcaria galapagensis
- Bifurcaria rotunda

== Uses ==
Bifurcaria is a source of unique diterpenoids which may prove pharmaceutically beneficial. In one preliminary study, an extract of Bifurcaria bifurcata halted the proliferation of cancer cells.
