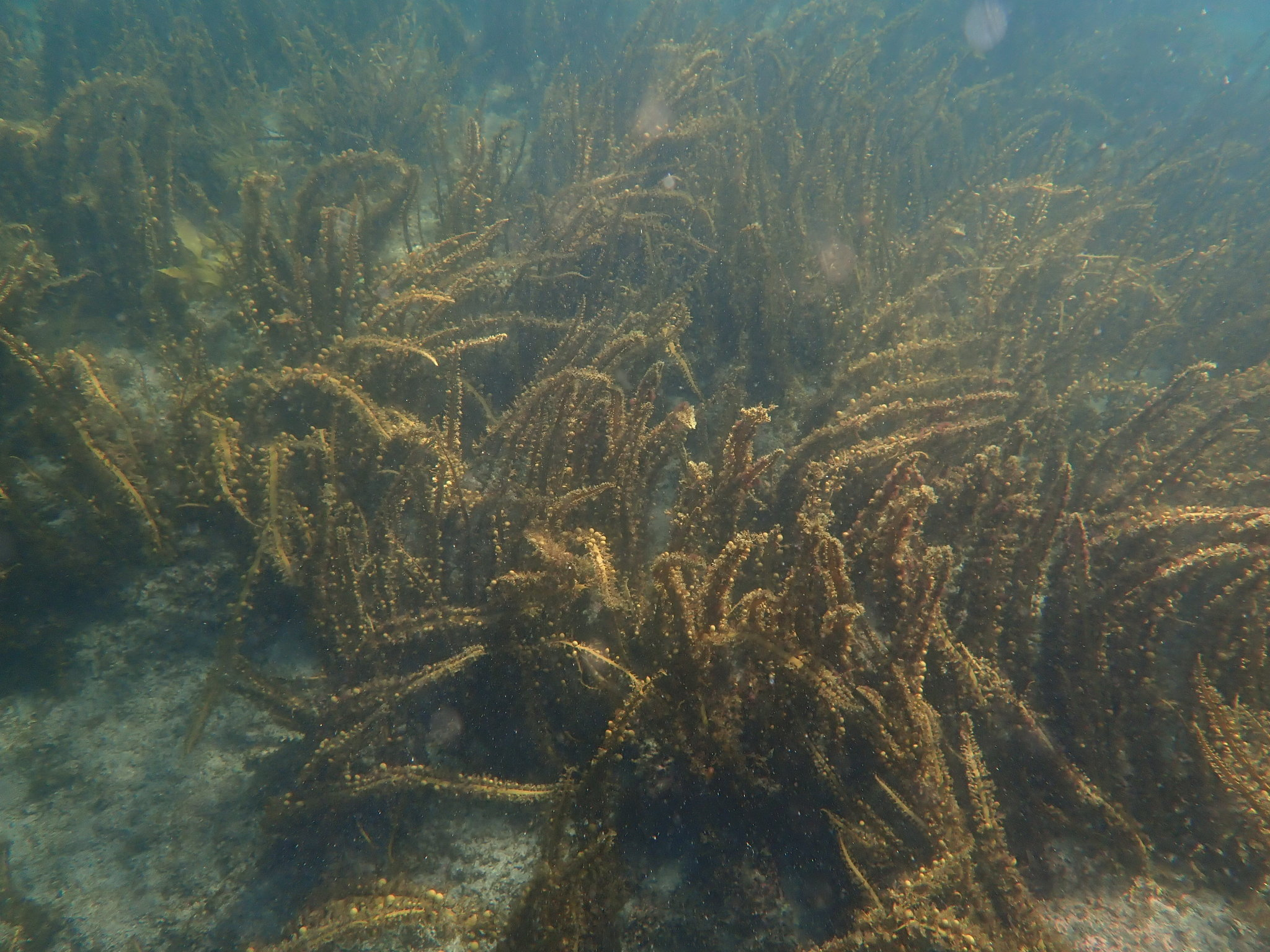
- Carpophyllum plumosum observed at the Cape Rodney-Okakari Point Marine Reserve.

Scientific classification
- Domain: Eukaryota
- Clade: Diaphoretickes
- Clade: SAR
- Clade: Stramenopiles
- Phylum: Gyrista
- Subphylum: Ochrophytina
- Class: Phaeophyceae
- Order: Fucales
- Family: Sargassaceae
- Genus: Carpophyllum; Greville, 1830

= Carpophyllum =

Genus of brown algae

Carpophyllum is a genus of brown algae belonging to the family Sargassaceae.

Species:

- Carpophyllum angustifolium J.Agardh
- Carpophyllum elongatum (Dickie) A.Gepp & E.S.Gepp
- Carpophyllum flexuosum (Esper) Greville
- Carpophyllum japonicum (G.Martens) De Toni
- Carpophyllum longifolium (Turner) De Toni
- Carpophyllum macrophyllum Montagne
- Carpophyllum maschalocarpum (Turner) Greville
- Carpophyllum phyllanthum (Turner) J.D.Hooker & Harvey
- Carpophyllum plumosum (A.Richard) J.Agardh
- Carpophyllum scalare Suhr
- Carpophyllum serratum Suhr
