= St Patrick's Bridge =

Intertidal elongated landform in Ireland

St Patrick's Bridge Droichead Pádraig (Irish)
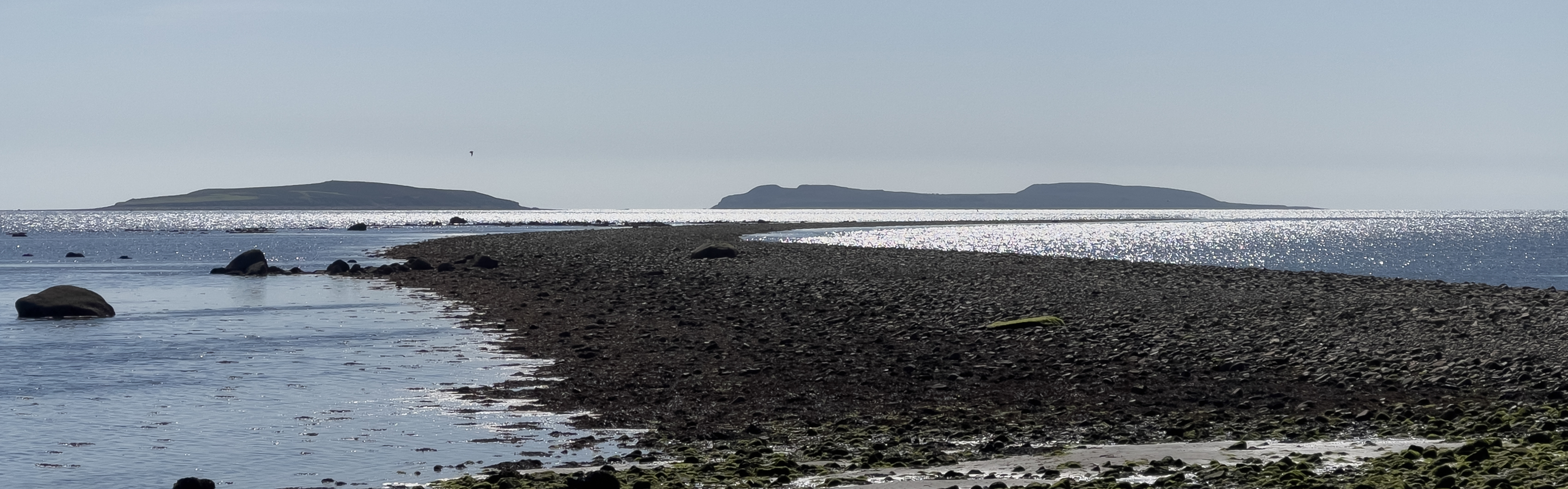
- St Patrick's Bridge in 2024

- Location within Ireland
- Interactive map of St Patrick's Bridge
- Coordinates: 52°10′20″N 6°34′30″W
- Grid position: S 97478 03039
- Location: Kilmore Quay
- Water bodies: Celtic Sea
- Age: Quaternary Age
- Formed by: Deposited glacial sediments

St Patrick's Bridge (Irish: Droichead Pádraig) is an intertidal elongated landform and moraine ridge in County Wexford in Ireland. The ridge connects Nemestown townland east of Kilmore Quay to Little Saltee in the Saltee Islands via the Celtic Sea.

== Formation and composition ==
The moraine was deposited from the British-Irish Ice Sheet during the last Ice Age. Radiocarbon dating of shells in the moraine were used to infer the maximum extent of the British-Irish Ice Sheet during the Last Glacial Maximum. It is composed of mudstone, sand, gravel and granite from the Quaternary Age.

According to an alternative explanation, St Patrick's Bridge could be the surviving remainings of a tombolo, connecting the main land to the Saltee Islands. The breach of the barrier could have been due to an easterly storm or through sea-level changes.

In August 1969, the British Phycological Society collected algae on the moraine during a visit to County Wexford. The species Halidrys siliquosa, Furcellaria fastigiata, Chorda filum, and Zostera marina were found in the area.

There is a legend that the ridge was formed when Irish patron saint Saint Patrick chased the Devil from County Tipperary down to the coast of County Wexford. The legend says that the Devil went into the water, with Patrick throwing stones as the Devil swam, (Note: In the legend, Saint Patrick does not follow the Devil into the water as he is unable to swim.) with the arc-shape of the landform being the devil's swimming route.

== St Patrick's Rock ==
St Patrick's Rock

St Patrick's Rock is a large glacial erratic in the Celtic Sea. It is composed of Carnsore granite, and lies around 250 m offshore to the east of St Patrick's Bridge.

The legend also says that St Patrick's Rock is a piece of the Forth Mountain that Saint Patrick threw into the Celtic Sea, though the Forth Mountain is quartzite while St Patrick's Rock is granite. The Geological Survey of Ireland considers the legend to be an example of geomythology.
