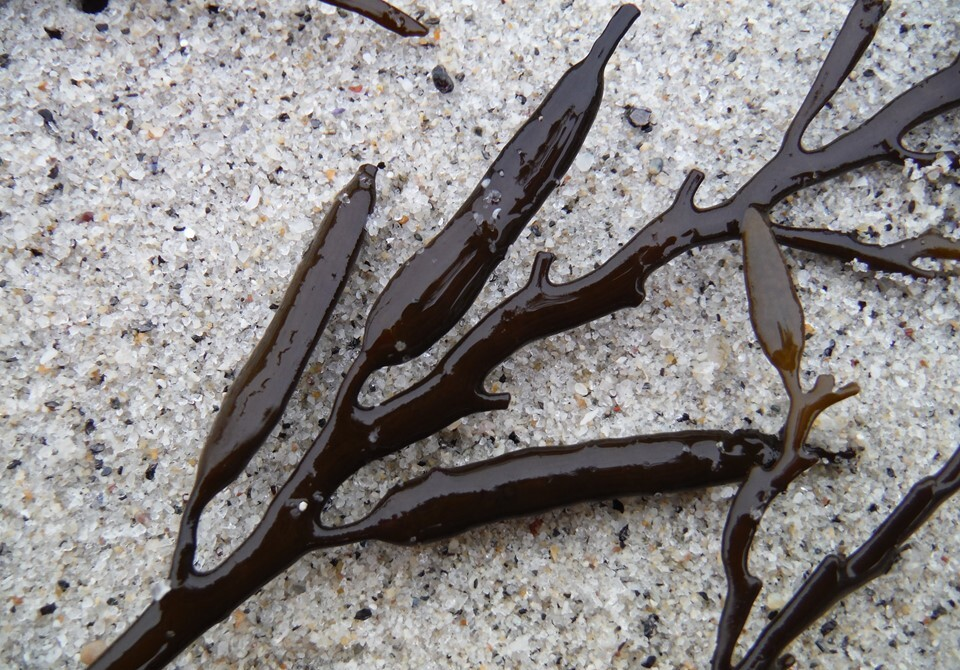
- Halidrys siliquosa

Scientific classification
- Domain: Eukaryota
- Clade: Diaphoretickes
- Clade: SAR
- Clade: Stramenopiles
- Phylum: Gyrista
- Subphylum: Ochrophytina
- Class: Phaeophyceae
- Order: Fucales
- Family: Sargassaceae
- Genus: Halidrys; Lyngbye, 1819

= Halidrys =

Genus of algae

Halidrys is a genus of brown algae belonging to the family Sargassaceae.

The species of this genus are found in Europe and Northern America.

Species:

- Halidrys dioica Gardn.
- Halidrys siliquosa (L.) Lyngb.
