= Piccone =

Piccone is an Italian surname. Notable people with the surname include:

- Carmen Piccone (1929–2005), American football coach
- Lou Piccone (born 1949), American football player
- Paul Piccone (1940–2004), Italian-American philosopher, critical theorist, intellectual historian and journal editor
