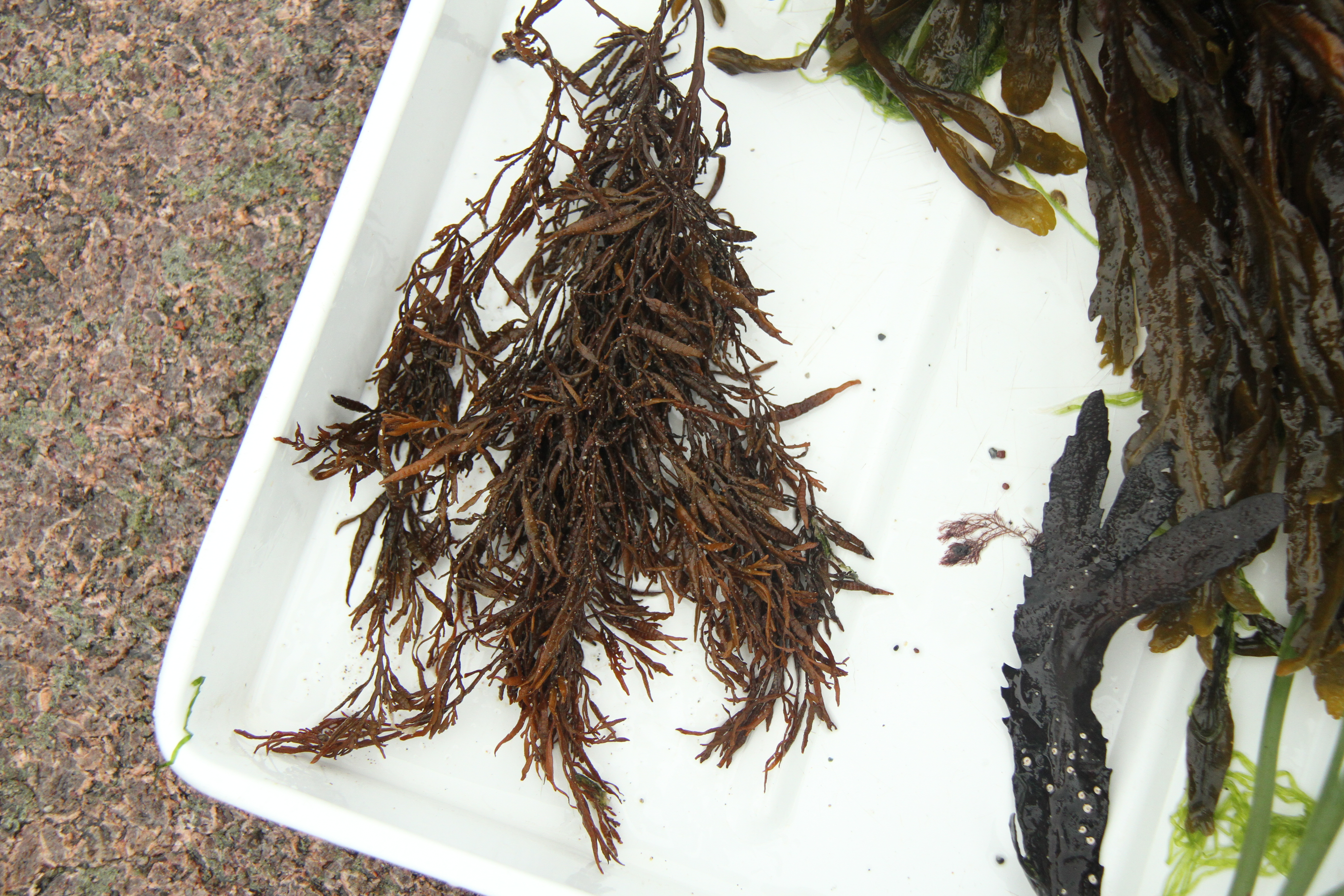
- A fresh piece of Halidrys siliquosa lying in a tray, with some other seaweeds

Scientific classification
- Domain: Eukaryota
- Clade: Sar
- Clade: Stramenopiles
- Division: Ochrophyta
- Class: Phaeophyceae
- Order: Fucales
- Family: Sargassaceae
- Genus: Halidrys
- Species: H. siliquosa

Binomial name
- Halidrys siliquosa (Linnaeus) Lyngbye

= Halidrys siliquosa =

Species of Phaeophyceae

Halidrys siliquosa is a large marine brown algae.

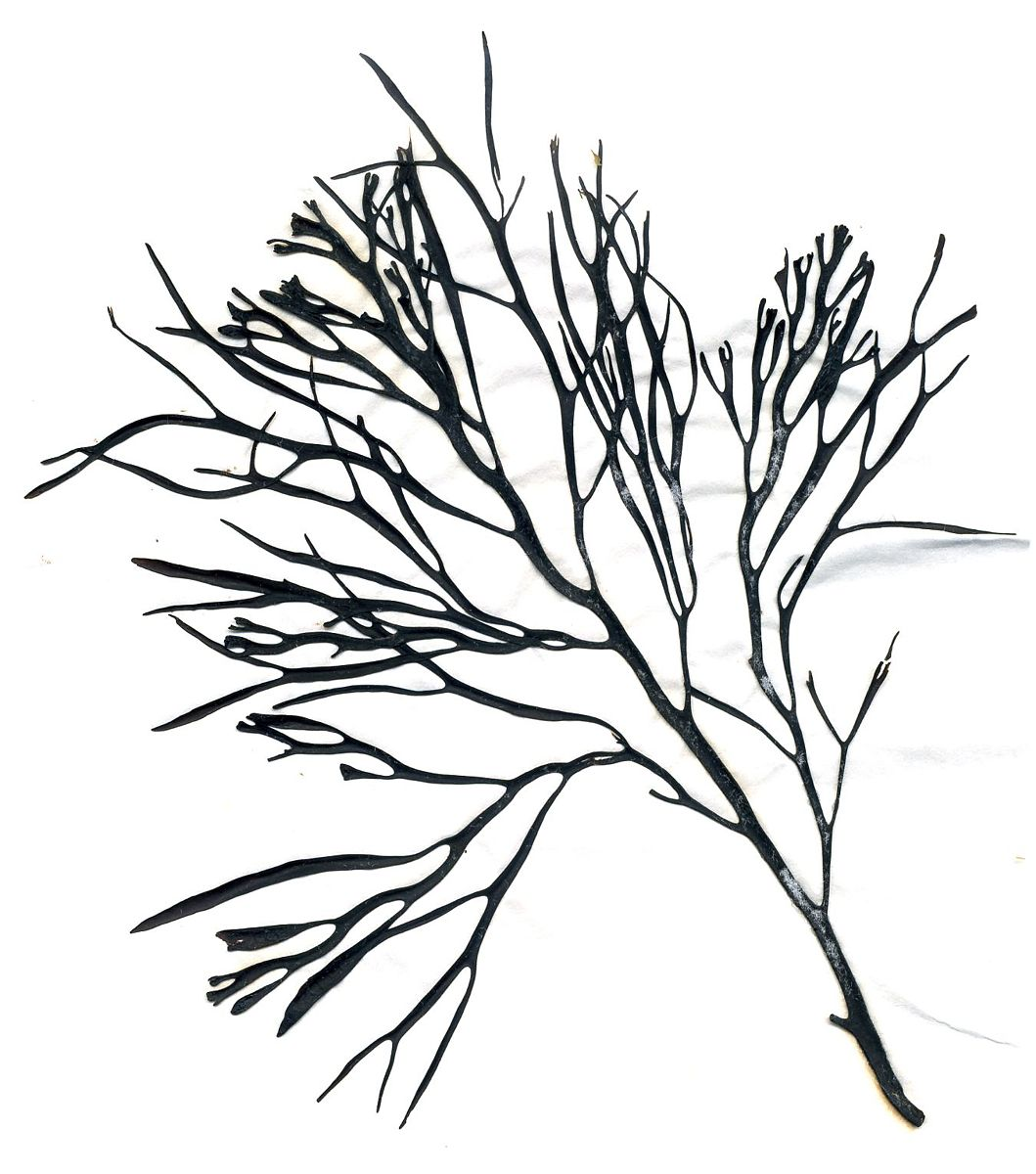
Halidrys siliquosa herbarium sheet. Collected in Heligoland, Germany

== Description ==
Halidrys siliquosa is a large brown alga growing to a length of 120 centimetres (47 in). The fronds are somewhat flattened, tough and leathery. They and less than 1 cm broad. The branches occur alternately arranged in one plane. Air bladders occur and are oblong and pointed. The plants are attached by a discoid holdfast.

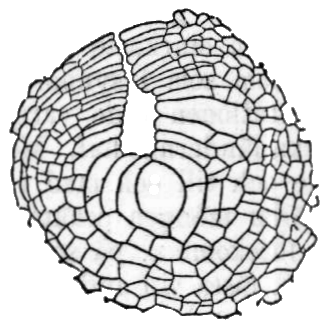
Halidrys siliquosa cross-section

== Reproduction ==
The plants are hermaphroditic, bearing bisexual conceptacles appearing as pods on stalks at the end of branches.

== Distribution ==
Generally found around Ireland, Great Britain - including Shetland and the Isle of Man.

== Habitat ==
Low level, low littoral, rock pools.
