= Friedrich Weber (entomologist) =

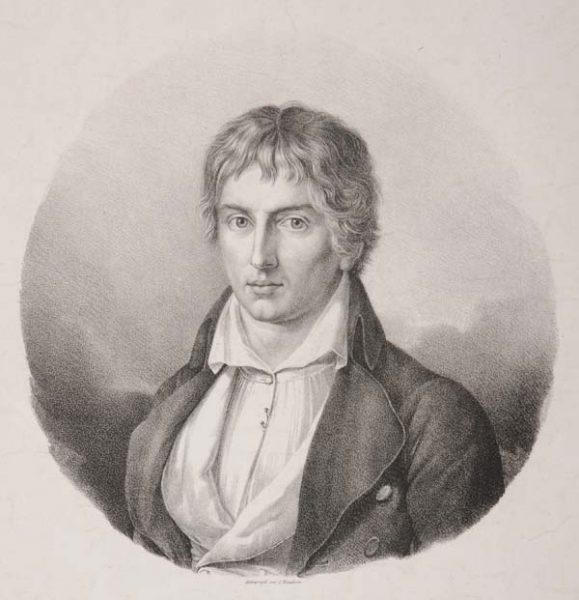
- Friedrich Weber, lithograph by Siegfried Bendixen, 1828
- Born: August 3, 1781; Kiel, Duchy of Holstein
- Died: March 21, 1823 (aged 41); Kiel, Duchy of Holstein
- Education: University of Kiel
- Known for: Nomenclator entomologicus, Observationes entomologicae and Description of the genus Homarus
- Scientific career
- Fields: Medicine, Botany and Entomology
- Institutions: University of Kiel
- Author abbrev. (botany): Weber
- Author abbrev. (zoology): Weber

Friedrich Weber (3 August 1781, Kiel – 21 March 1823, Kiel) was a German medical doctor, botanist and entomologist. He was a pupil of Johan Christian Fabricius (1745–1808), and wrote Nomenclator entomologicus in 1795 at the age of 14 and Observationes entomologicae in 1801. These two works contained the first descriptions of many new insect species and also first descriptions of other invertebrates like the lobster genus Homarus.

== Partial list of works ==
- 1795 : Nomenclator entomologicus secundum entomologian systematicam ill. Fabricii, adjectis speciebus recens detectis et varietatibus. Chiloni et Hamburgi: C.E. Bohn viii 171 pp.
- 1801. Observationes entomologicae, continentes novorum quae condidit generum characteres, et nuper detectarum specierum descriptiones. Impensis Bibliopolii Academici Novi, Kiliae, 12 + 116 pp. [xerox: 112-116]
- with M. H. Mohr 1804. Naturhistorische Reise durch einen Theil Schwedens. Göttingen.
