= Daniel Matthias Heinrich Mohr =

German botanist (1780–1808)

- Born: 8 April 1780; Quickborn, Duchy of Holstein
- Died: 26 August 1808 (aged 28); Kiel, Duchy of Holstein
- Education: University of Kiel, University of Göttingen
- Scientific career
- Fields: Botany

Daniel Matthias Heinrich Mohr (8 April 1780, Quickborn – 26 August 1808, Kiel) was a German botanist.

As a young botanist from the Duchy of Holstein, he started his career as a pupil of Johan Christian Fabricius at Kiel and Heinrich Adolf Schrader at the University of Göttingen. He later became a professor of zoology and botany, and his research projects focused on algae and bryophytes. He named many species (often together with Friedrich Weber) and was among the first to systematise algae by means of their reproduction.

In 1803 he obtained his doctorate from the University of Kiel with the dissertation Observationes Botanicae quibus plantarum cryptogamarum ordines. In the summer of 1803, with Weber, he toured southern Sweden and made the acquaintance of Erik Acharius, Olof Swartz, Carl Peter Thunberg and Adam Afzelius. As a result of the journey, Mohr and Weber published Naturhistorische Reise durch einen Theil Schwedens (1804). In 1805 he issued the exsiccata Schleswig-Holsteinische Algae aquaticae. In 1807 he became an associate professor at Kiel, but died the following year at the age of 28. In addition to the aforementioned work, he also published with Weber the following:

- Index musei plantarum cryptogamarum, 1803.
- Beiträge zur Naturkunde Erster Band, 1805.
- Beiträge zur Naturkunde 2, 1810.

In 1806 Olof Swartz named the botanical genus Mohria after him.

Specimens collected by Mohr are cared for in herbaria around the world, including the University of Oslo Herbarium (O), and the National Herbarium of Victoria (MEL), Royal Botanic Gardens Victoria.
