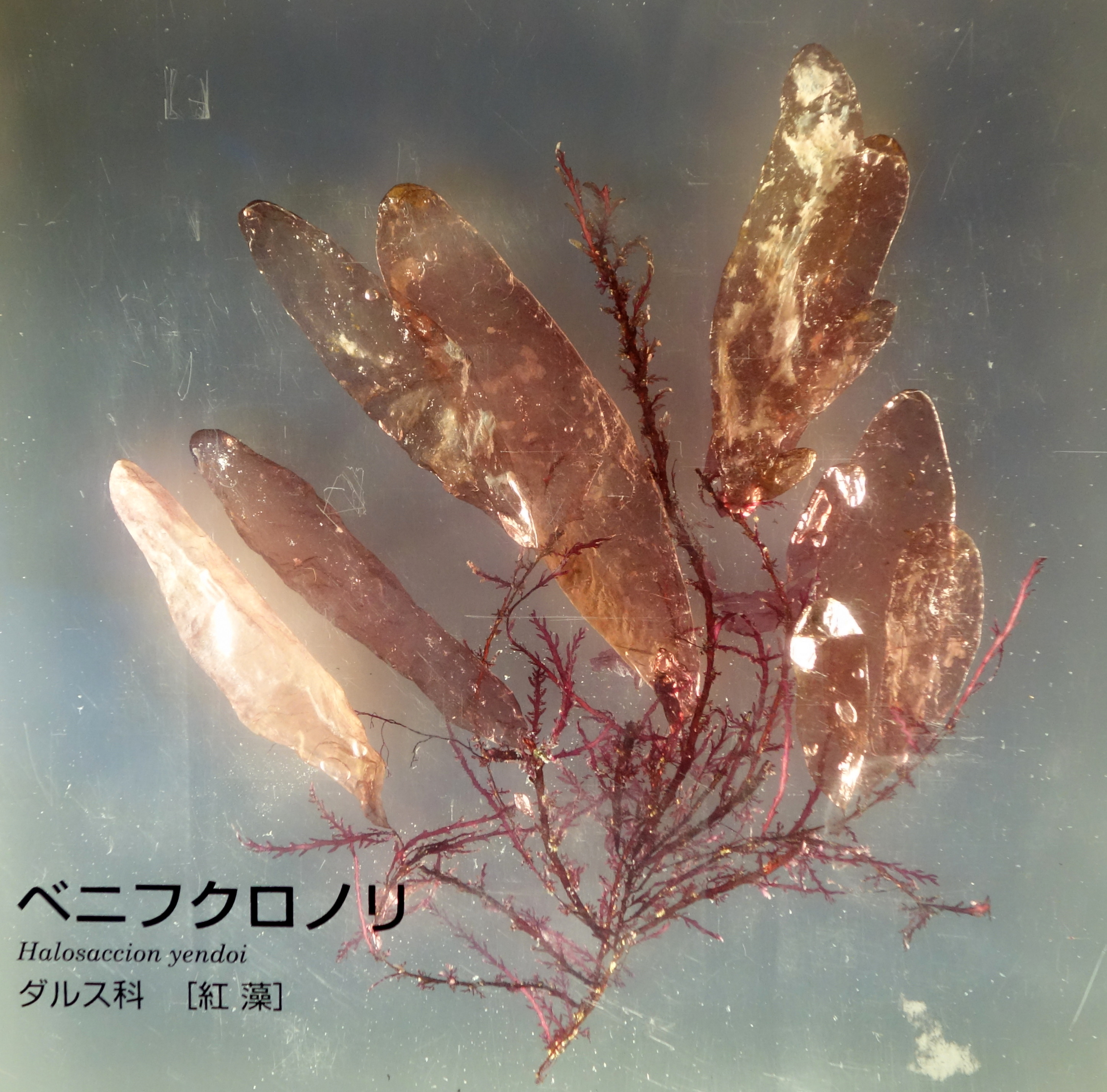
- Halosaccion yendoi on exhibit in the National Museum of Nature and Science, Tokyo

Scientific classification
- Clade: Archaeplastida
- Division: Rhodophyta
- Class: Florideophyceae
- Subclass: Nemaliophycidae
- Order: Palmariales; Guiry & D.E.G. Irvine

Families
- Meiodiscaceae S.L.Clayden & G.W.Saunders, 2010; Palmariaceae Guiry, 1974; Rhodophysemataceae G.W. Saunders & J.L. McLachlan, 1990; Rhodothamniellaceae G. W. Saunders

= Palmariales =

Order of algae

Palmariales is an order of marine algae. It includes the edible seaweed dulse (Palmaria palmata).
