= Michael D. Guiry =

Irish phycologist and founder of AlgaeBase

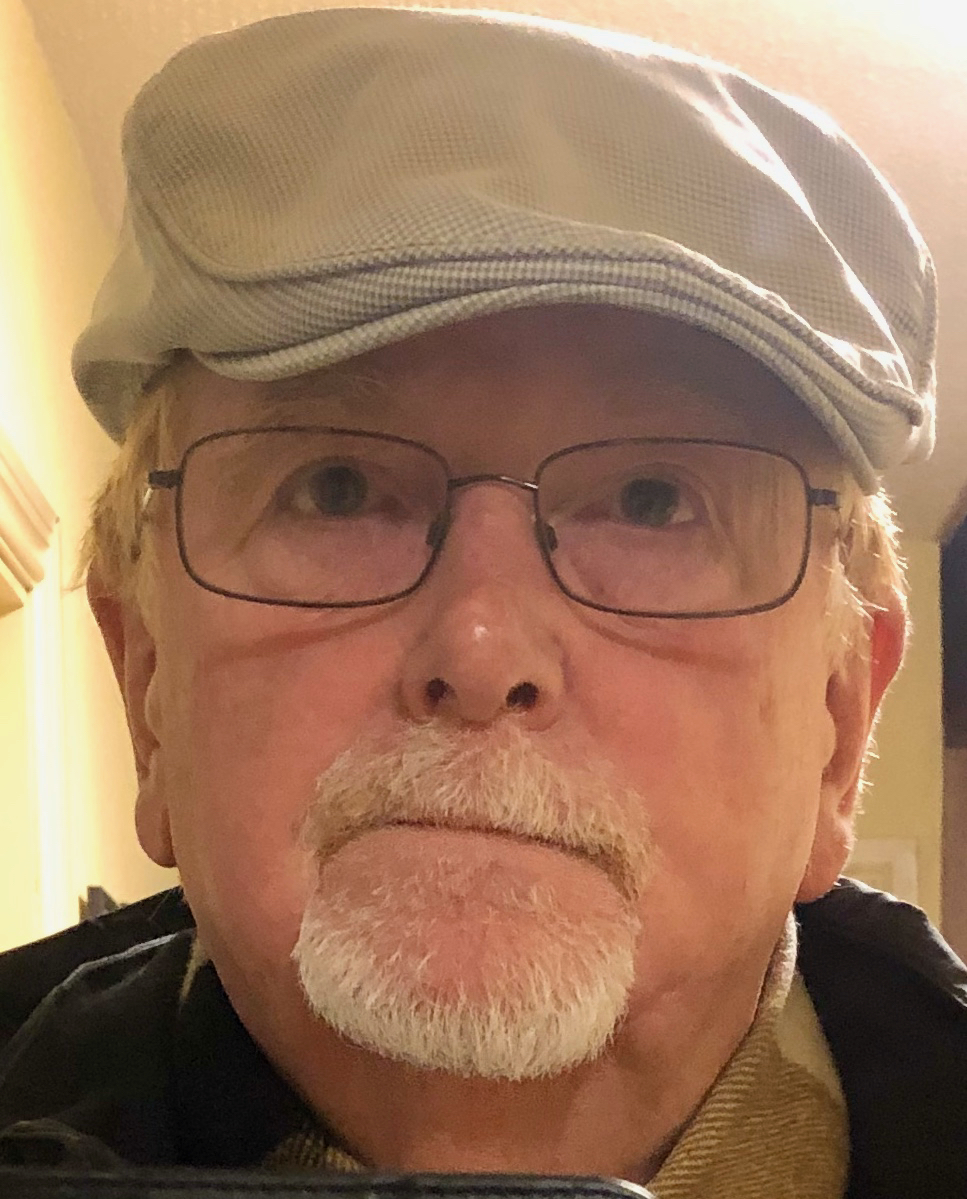
- (29 October 2019)
- Born: 1949 (age 76–77)
- Education: University College Cork; University of London
- Scientific career
- Fields: Phycology; Taxonomy databasing
- Workplaces: National University of Ireland
- Author abbrev. (botany): Guiry

Michael Dominic Richard Guiry (born 1949), is an Irish botanist, who specialises in phycology (algae). He is the founder and director of the algal database, AlgaeBase.

He is a graduate of both University College Cork and the University of London. In addition to his interest in the taxonomy and the databasing of algae, his algal site promotes the sustainable use of seaweed resources.

Since 2009, he has been an emeritus professor at the Ryan Institute, National University of Ireland, in Galway.

The standard author abbreviation Guiry is used to indicate this person as the author when citing a botanical name.

== Some published names ==
- Achnanthes armillaris (O.F.Müller) Guiry
- Aglaothamnion priceanum Maggs, Guiry & Rueness
- Capreolia implexa Guiry & Womersley
- Chondracanthus canaliculatus (Harvey) Guiry
- Chondracanthus corymbiferus (Kützing) Guiry
- Nostoc flagelliforme Harvey ex Molinari, Calvo-Pérez & Guiry

(in AlgaeBase, as Guiry, over 300 algal species listed, not all currently accepted)

== Publications ==
(incomplete)

=== Books ===
- Hardy, F.G.; Guiry, M.D. (2003). A Check-list and Atlas of the Seaweeds of Britain and Ireland (PDF). London: British Phycological Society. ISBN 978-0-9527115-1-3. Archived from the original (PDF) on 1 February 2014.

=== Articles ===
- Hommersand, M.H.; Guiry, M.D.; Fredericq, S.; Leister, G.L. (1993). "New perspectives in the taxonomy of the Gigartinaceae (Gigartinales, Rhodophyta)". Hydrobiologia. 260–261 (1): 105–120. doi:10.1007/BF00049009. S2CID 46463097.
- Maggs, C.A.; Guiry, M.D.; Rueness, J. (2007). "Aglaothamnion priceanum sp. nov. (Ceramiaceae, Rhodophyta) from the North-Eastern Atlantic: Morphology and life history of Parasporangial plants". British Phycological Journal. 26 (4): 343–352. doi:10.1080/00071619100650311. hdl:10379/9469. ISSN 0007-1617. pdf
- Masuda, Michio; Kogame, Kazuhiro; Guiry, Michael D. (2019). "Life history of Gymnogongrus griffithsiae (Phyllophoraceae, Gigartinales) from Ireland: implications for life history interpretation in the Rhodophyta". Phycologia. 35 (5): 421–434. doi:10.2216/i0031-8884-35-5-421.1. ISSN 0031-8884.
- Guiry, M.D.; Maggs, C.A. (2009). "Reproduction and life history of Meredithia microphylla (J. Ag.) J. Ag. (Kallymeniaceae, Rhodophyta) from Ireland". Giornale Botanico Italiano. 118 (3–4): 105–125. doi:10.1080/11263508409426665. ISSN 0017-0070.
- Appeltans, W.; et al. (2012). "The Magnitude of Global Marine Species Diversity" (PDF). Current Biology. 22 (23): 2189–2202. doi:10.1016/j.cub.2012.09.036. ISSN 0960-9822. PMID 23159596. S2CID 14930041.
- Masuda, Michio; Guiry, Michael D. (1995). "Reproductive morphology of Itonoa marginifera(J. Agardh) gen. et comb. nov. (Nemastomataceae, Rhodophyta)". European Journal of Phycology. 30 (1): 57–67. doi:10.1080/09670269500650801. hdl:10379/9491. ISSN 0967-0262.
- Guiry, M.D.; Hollenberg, G.J. (2007). "Schotteragen. nov. and Schottera nicaeensis(Lamour. ex Duby) comb. nov. (=Petroglossum nicaeense(Lamour. ex Duby) Schotter) in the British Isles". British Phycological Journal. 10 (2): 149–164. doi:10.1080/00071617500650141. ISSN 0007-1617.
