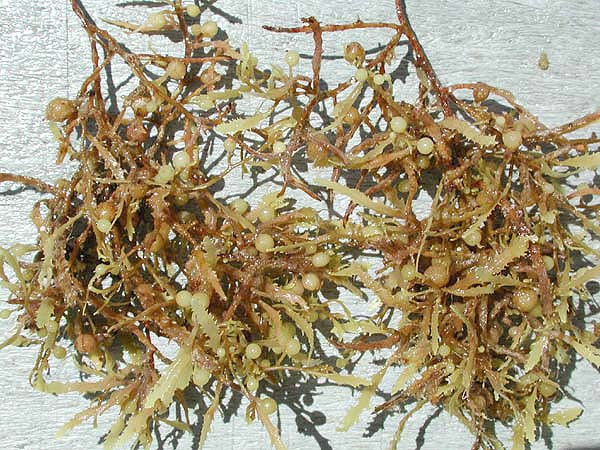

Scientific classification
- Domain: Eukaryota
- Clade: Diaphoretickes
- Clade: SAR
- Clade: Stramenopiles
- Phylum: Gyrista
- Subphylum: Ochrophytina
- Class: Phaeophyceae
- Order: Fucales
- Family: Sargassaceae; Kützing, 1843

Genera
- Acrocarpia; Anthophycus; Axillariella; Bifurcaria; Brassicophycus; Carpoglossum; Carpophyllum; Caulocystis; Cladophyllum; Coccophora; Cystophora; Cystoseira; Ericaria; Gongolaria; Halidrys; Hormophysa; Landsburgia; Myagropsis; Myriodesma; Nizamuddinia; Oerstedtia; Phyllotricha; Platythalia; Polycladia; Sargassopsis; Sargassum; Scaberia; Sirophysalis; Stephanocystis; Stolonophora; Turbinaria

= Sargassaceae =

Family of seaweeds

Sargassaceae is a family of brown algae in the order Fucales.

== See also ==
- Carpophyllum maschalocarpum
- Halidrys siliquosa
