= Laminaria abyssalis =

Scientific classification
- Domain: Eukaryota
- Clade: Sar
- Clade: Stramenopiles
- Division: Ochrophyta
- Class: Phaeophyceae
- Order: Laminariales
- Family: Laminariaceae
- Genus: Laminaria
- Species: L. abyssalis

Binomial name
- Laminaria abyssalis A.B.Joly & E.C.Oliveira

Species of plant

Laminaria abyssalis is a species of brown kelp, notable for its connection to rhodolith beds in the Brazilian coastline.

== Distribution and ecology ==
Laminaria abyssalis is native to the Atlantic Ocean, off the coast of Brazil. It resides in a habitat spanning over 33,000 km^{2} (13,000 sq mi), from upper Espírito Santo to Mid Rio de Janeiro. It thrives in the waters of the continental shelf and intertidal zone, at depths of 40 to 120 m (130 to 390 ft). The majority of these kelp take root in Rhodolith beds; substrates formed by nodules of calcareous algae.

== Morphology ==
The stipe of the Laminaria abyssalis averaged out to be 14.3 centimeters in length, with an average width of 0.7 centimeters. The stipe supports an undivided blade, averages out to a length of 241 centimeters, width of 68 centimeters, and thickness of 0.65 centimeters. The holdfast which attaches Laminaria abyssalis to the rhodolith bed it resides in has an average of 4 root-like extensions, each averaging to 13.5 centimeters in length.

== History ==
Laminaria abyssalis was first discovered in 1967 by A. B. Joly and E. C. Oliveira, who found it in the Brazilian Coastline.

A later expedition was made by Quége N in 1988 to determine the many locations in which Laminaria abyssalis grows along Brazil.

As of lately, the kelp has been in a semi-endangered state, as sand trawling has become more common in Brazilian waters. This has disrupted the rhodolith beds in which Laminaria abyssalis grows, causing the kelp to slightly die out. The RESTORESEAS project has begun collecting data and making experiments to preserve the lives of these kelps.
