= Laminaria nigripes =

Scientific classification
- Domain: Eukaryota
- Clade: Sar
- Clade: Stramenopiles
- Division: Ochrophyta
- Class: Phaeophyceae
- Order: Laminariales
- Family: Laminariaceae
- Genus: Laminaria
- Species: L. nigripes

Binomial name
- Laminaria nigripes J.Agardh, 1868

Species of seaweed

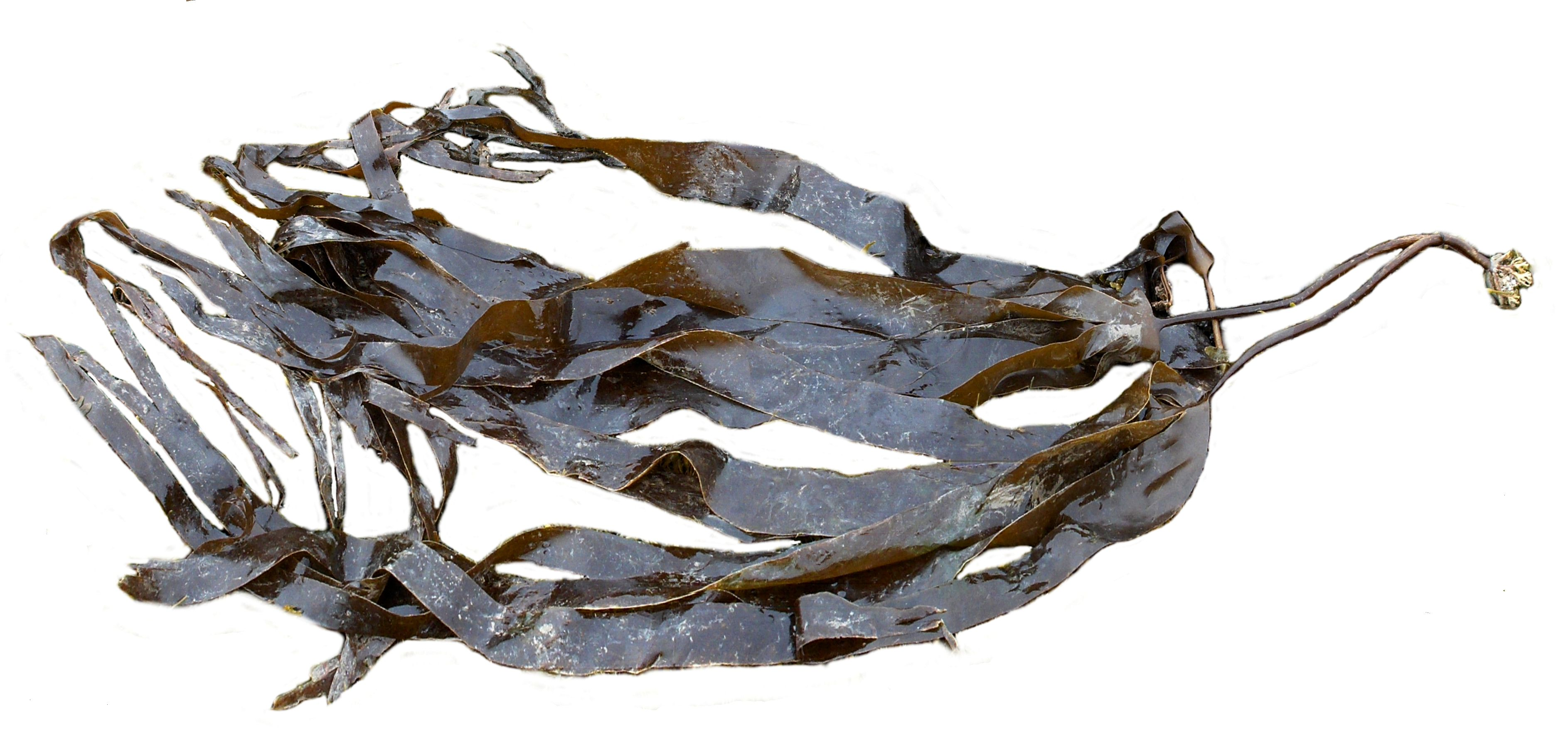
Laminaria nigripes is commonly confused with L. digitata, pictured above, in the Northwest Atlantic.

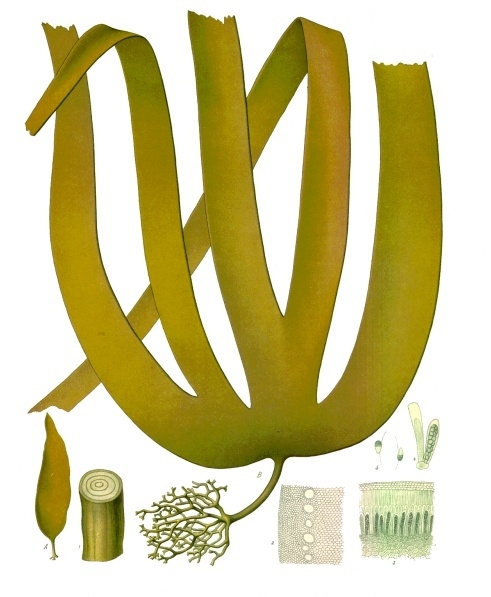
Laminaria nigripes is commonly confused with L. hyperborea, pictured above, in Europe.

Laminaria nigripes is a species of kelp found in the North Atlantic and North Pacific within Arctic and subarctic waters including Vancouver Island, Haida Gwaii, Greenland, Iceland, Norway, Downeast Maine, and the Bay of Fundy. The species may be found exclusively in the Arctic, but frequent misidentification of samples has led to speculation and debate over whether the actual range is subarctic or Arctic. The species is commonly confused with L. digitata and L. hyperborea and is at risk from climate change.

== Phylogeny ==
Laminaria nigripes is a species within the genus Laminaria in the family Laminariaceae, which is one of eight families in the order of Laminariales. Laminariales are in the class Phaeophyceae, or brown algae, which are commonly referred to as kelp. L. nigripes was first described in 1868 under the name Saccharina nigripes by Jacob Georg Agardh in Spitsbergen, Norway.

=== Saccharina ===
Recent molecular genetic insight has led some researchers to suggest that the genetic species known as L. nigripes ought to be a part of the genus Saccharina. Specifically, the genus Saccharina Stackhouse from 1809 is proposed for revival. The revived Saccharina Stackhouse would include the genera Hedophyllum and Kjellmaniella, the species Cymathaere japonica, and certain species from Laminaria. With the re-establishment of Saccharina Stackhouse, L. nigripes would be renamed Saccharina nigripes.

=== Hedophyllum ===
Additional phylogenetic and molecular genetic research has added the possibility that the genus Saccharina is actually a clade containing the genera Anthrothamnus, Hedophyllum, Kjellmaniella, and Saccharina. Under this phylogenetic model, L. nigripes would fall under the reinstated genus Hedophyllum 1901 Setchell as Hedophyllum nigripes. Part of the reasoning behind the proposed switch is bringing L. nigripes and its closest known relative, Saccharina subsessilis, together on the phylogenetic tree. Saccharina subessilis would become Hedophyllum subsessilis and be the lectotype species for L. nigripes. In addition to H. nigripes and H. subsessilis, the genus Hedophyllum would contain the species H. bongardiana, H. dentigera, H. druehlii, and H. sessilis. The species within the Hedophyllum genus have flexible stipes and lack tissue cavitation, true branching, and split branching.

=== Misidentification ===
Because the digitate blade of L. nigripes is similar to the blade of L. digitata, L. nigripes samples are commonly misidentified as L. digitata in the Maritime Provinces of Canada and the Northwest Atlantic which has contributed to fewer reportings of L. nigripes in that region. Additionally, L. nigripes is often confused with L. hyperborea in Europe. In addition to the similar blade morphology, the difficulty of correctly identifying a sample via mucilage ducts has added further confusion. Because there is confusion around the identification of L. nigripes and similar species, the genetic species of L. nigripes has been referred to by multiple names including Saccharina nigripes, Hedophyllum nigripes, Saccharina groelandica, and L. bongardiana.

== Morphology ==
=== Blades ===
Laminaria nigripes has two main phenotypes, one with a simple blade and one with a digitate blade. Both of these phenotypes are the same genetic species. The digitate bladed phenotypes is more common and can appear morphologically similar to L. digitata while the simple bladed phenotype, which is much rarer, appears morphologically similar to Saccharina latissima. The presence of these phenotypes varies between the Northeast Pacific and Northwest Atlantic with a higher prevalence of the simple bladed phenotype in the Pacific than in the Atlantic. Because of the presence of multiple phenotypes, L. nigripes is known to have phenotypic plasticity. When young, L. nigripes has a stipe and bullated blades. As an individual matures, the stipe can be lost but may remain, and the blades often become smooth and cordate with lacerations. Because the blades of L. nigripes are prone to being torn by environmental factors, the blades can be split into multiple segments, but the blades do not experience split branching or true branching.

=== Mucilage ducts ===
The presence of mucilage ducts varies between kelp species and has been used in the identification process, but pseudo mucilage ducts can be formed from infections and obscure the identification process. L. nigripes can have mucilage ducts on the stipe or blades, and the presence of mucilage ducts in the cortex of the stipe for a cross section of a sample can be used to identify L. nigripes individuals under a microscope. However, the mucilage ducts of L. nigripes can become infected and appear as pseudo mucilage ducts, and mucilage ducts are less likely to be present in individuals from more northern, colder waters.

== Habitat and distribution ==
Laminaria nigripes is distributed in the North Atlantic and North Pacific, within Arctic, subarctic, and cold temperate waters. The range of L. nigripes varies latitudinally between the Pacifica and Atlantic with records of the species in the waters around the southern end of British Columbia and a more northern distribution in the Atlantic. In the Northwest Atlantic, L. nigripes is absent in Atlantic Nova Scotia, the Northumberland Strait of New Brunswick, Southern Maine, Massachusetts, and Rhode Island. Additionally, some researches have claimed that L. nigripes has distribution in subarctic but not Arctic waters. L. nigripes is recorded in Europe in addition to the Northwest Atlantic. There is some evidence that L. nigripes plays an important ecological role in the Bay of Fundy, but researchers caution that more research needs to be done before the distribution of L. nigripes in Atlantic Canada is clear. L. nigripes is also found off of Greenland along with Saccharina latissima, L. solidungula, Alaria esculenta, Agarum clathratum, Saccharina dermatodea, and Saccharina logicruris. In the Kara Sea, L. nigripes is observed with Saccharina latissima, L. solidungula, Alaria elliptica, and Alaria oblonga.

The North Pacific has more endemic species of kelp than the North Atlantic and is believed to be where kelps as a whole began. The Saccharina clade likely began in the Northwest Pacific before moving into the Northeast Pacific and later into the Atlantic via passage through the Arctic. During the Cretaceous through Pleistocene eras, tectonic plate movements and glacial periods continually changed the seaways into and out of the Arctic. This resulted in a succession of different biotic exchanges between the Arctic and other ocean basins which resulted in the spreading of species across ocean basins and the creation of new species.

Within its range, L. nigripes is most often found in areas of rocky, intertidal zone with moderate to high wave action. L. nigripes has to cope with and adjust to sea ice cover, low temperatures, and unique light conditions. Abrasion, low light, low salinity, and low temperatures are common in areas like these which can have ice cover for part or all of the year. Ice cover is not static and creates abrasions in kelps as it moves. Ice cover also limits the light available for organisms beneath it by reflecting light, and the low availability of light affects photosynthetic activity. With the ice cover and high latitude of these areas, there is a wide range in the amount of light available at certain times for photosynthetic organisms, and there is a rapid increase of light available as the ice cover breaks up. This results in a limited season for L. nigripes to grow. L. nigripes may utilize the cold water of these areas to reproduce by spreading spores and to support early development. Because L. nigripes prefers areas with moderate to high wave action, it shares that space with L. digitata in the Bay of Fundy.

=== Distribution changes in response to climate change ===
Changes in sea temperature, salinity, ecosystem composition and sea ice cover are forecast to globally impact the distribution of kelp species. At a study site, the presence of L. nigripes decreased at the same time as sea surface temperatures in the area increased, and the decrease could not be attributed to heavy storms, increased competition, or salinity changes. When the sea surface temperatures returned to a more typical level, L. nigripes did not recover. Kelps in general are affect by increased water temperatures because it disrupts their reproduction and development which may be why L. nigripes decreased during a period of increase in sea surface temperatures. During certain life stages, L. nigripes has an upper tolerance limit for temperature similar to that of Arctic species of kelp, and L. nigripes could struggle if it is temperature sensitive and if temperatures contain to rise .
