= Laminaria agardhii =

Scientific classification
- Domain: Eukaryota
- Clade: Sar
- Clade: Stramenopiles
- Division: Ochrophyta
- Class: Phaeophyceae
- Order: Laminariales
- Family: Laminariaceae
- Genus: Laminaria
- Species: L. agardhii

Binomial name
- Laminaria agardhii Kjellman

Species of seaweed

Laminaria agardhii is a species of brown kelp, noted by a strong holdfast and finger-like blades.

== Distribution and ecology ==
This species of algae is most commonly found in the northeastern Atlantic Ocean, distribution is as southern as Massachusetts, United States, and northern as Baffin Bay of the Canadian Arctic. This kelp exists in the sublittoral zone, adapted to grow among tidal rocks of depths between 0.5 and 3 meters.

== Morphology ==
A strong stem secures the plant among sublittoral rocks, the stem can reach 0.5 meters in length, attached to a strong, fibrous holdfast. The blade of the plant is narrow and long, substantially so more than the stem. The blade of the Laminaria agardhii grows to be approximately 30 cm in width, and 3 meters in length.

== Reproduction ==
Laminaria agardhii typically reproduces between September and April, peaking in January. This species of kelp reproduces via sporangia that grow on the surface of blades. The sporangia release zoospores with flagella, allowing for a greater area of dispersal. Gametophytes of Laminaria consist of a chain-like series of cells that grow into a new organism.

== Medicinal usages ==
Laminaria agardhii has many uses, ranging from traditional medicine to nutritional intake.

Laminaria is high in iodine, a nutrient crucial for proper thyroid function. In addition to promoting thyroid health, members of the family Laminariaceae can be used to induce and aid in labor. Pieces of laminaria can be put in the cervix and water added. The laminaria absorbs the water and enlarges, making the opening of the cervix larger.
