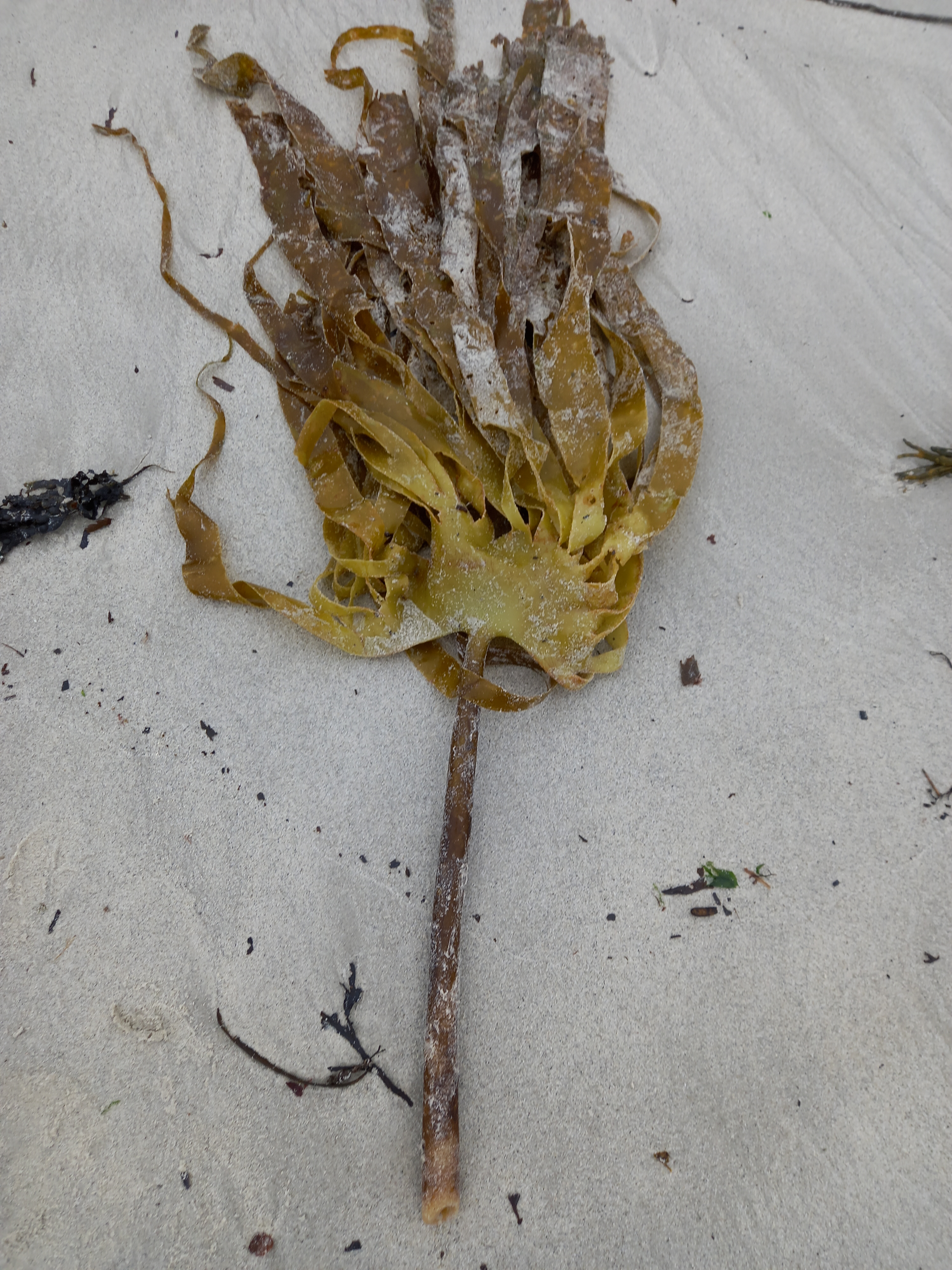

Scientific classification
- Domain: Eukaryota
- Clade: Sar
- Clade: Stramenopiles
- Division: Ochrophyta
- Class: Phaeophyceae
- Order: Laminariales
- Family: Laminariaceae
- Genus: Laminaria
- Species: L. ochroleuca

Binomial name
- Laminaria ochroleuca Bachelot de la Pylaie, 1824

= Laminaria ochroleuca =

Species of alga

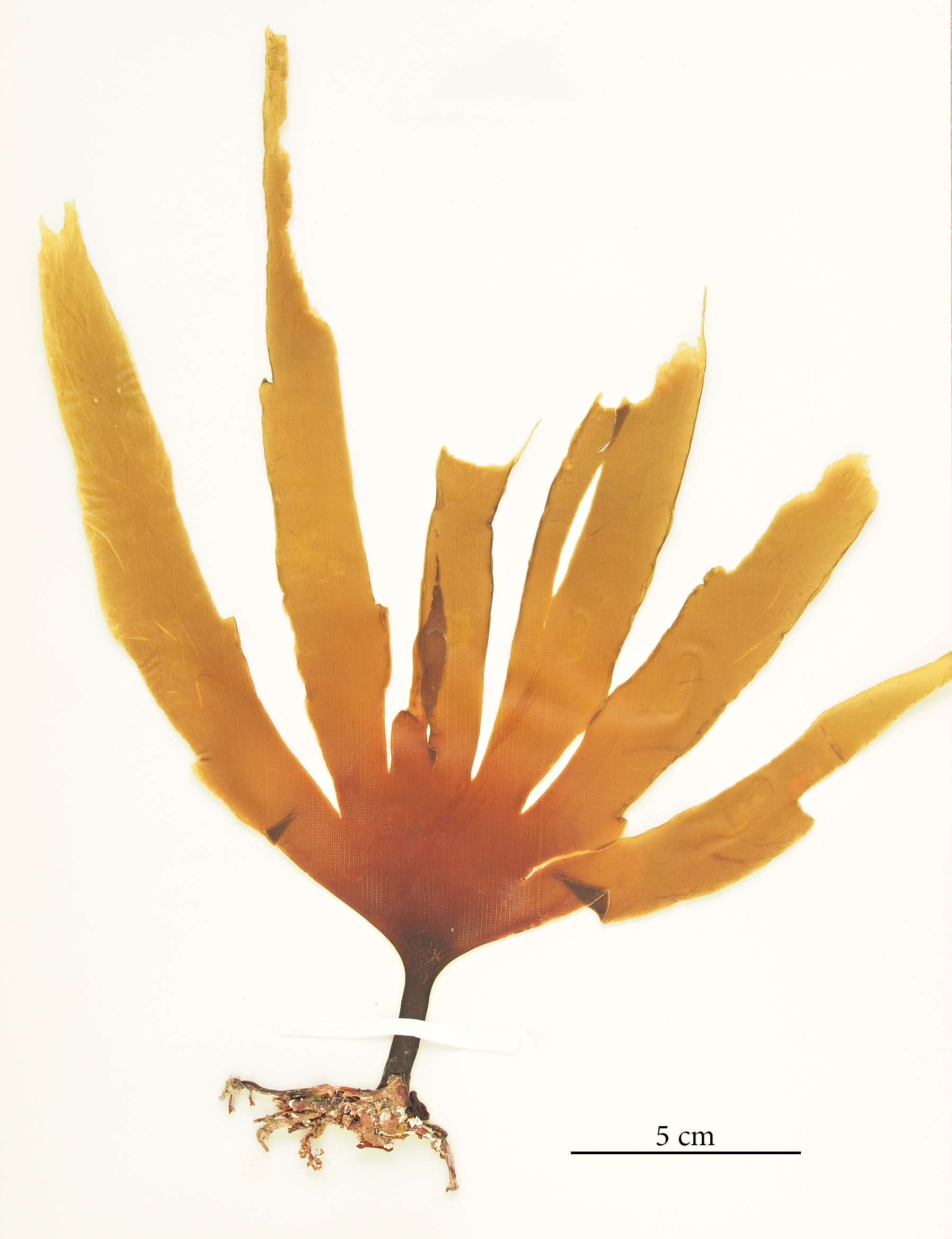
Laminaria ochroleuca

Laminaria ochroleuca is a large kelp, an alga in the order Laminariales. They are commonly known as golden kelp, due to their blade colouration, distinguishing them from Laminaria hyperborea

== Description ==
This large brown alga can grow to a length of 2 m. It has large leathery blades or fronds which grow from a stipe. The blade is without a midrib and divided into smooth linear sections. The stipe is stalk-like, stiff, smooth and attached to rocks by a claw-like holdfast. It is similar to Laminaria hyperborea but it is more yellow in colour and does not have the rough stipe of L. hyperborea.

Despite initial belief that the species was declining, investigations in 2022 and 2023 displayed recent growth and abundance of new individuals. It is suspected, however, that due to climate change, the range of Laminaria ochroleuca will shift north. The ideal temperature for the sporophyte phase is 12-22 °C, while the gametophyte has a narrower range of 15-18 °C.

== Reproduction ==
The life-cycle is of the large diploid sporophyte alternating with the microscopic haploid stages producing female gametophytes which are fertilized by male gametophytes (sperm).

== Distribution ==
This species is found in the Northern Hemisphere, from Morocco to the south of England In the UK, it was first documented in Plymouth Sound in 1946 and its range expansion continues due to climate change. It was found on the northeast coast of England beyond the Humber estuary before 1965.

== Bioactive Compounds ==
Laminaria ochroleuca has been shown to possess antimicrobial and antioxidant qualities, as well as a valuable source of nutrition. Actinobacteria strains isolated from Laminaria ochroleuca also revealed anticancer capabilities.
