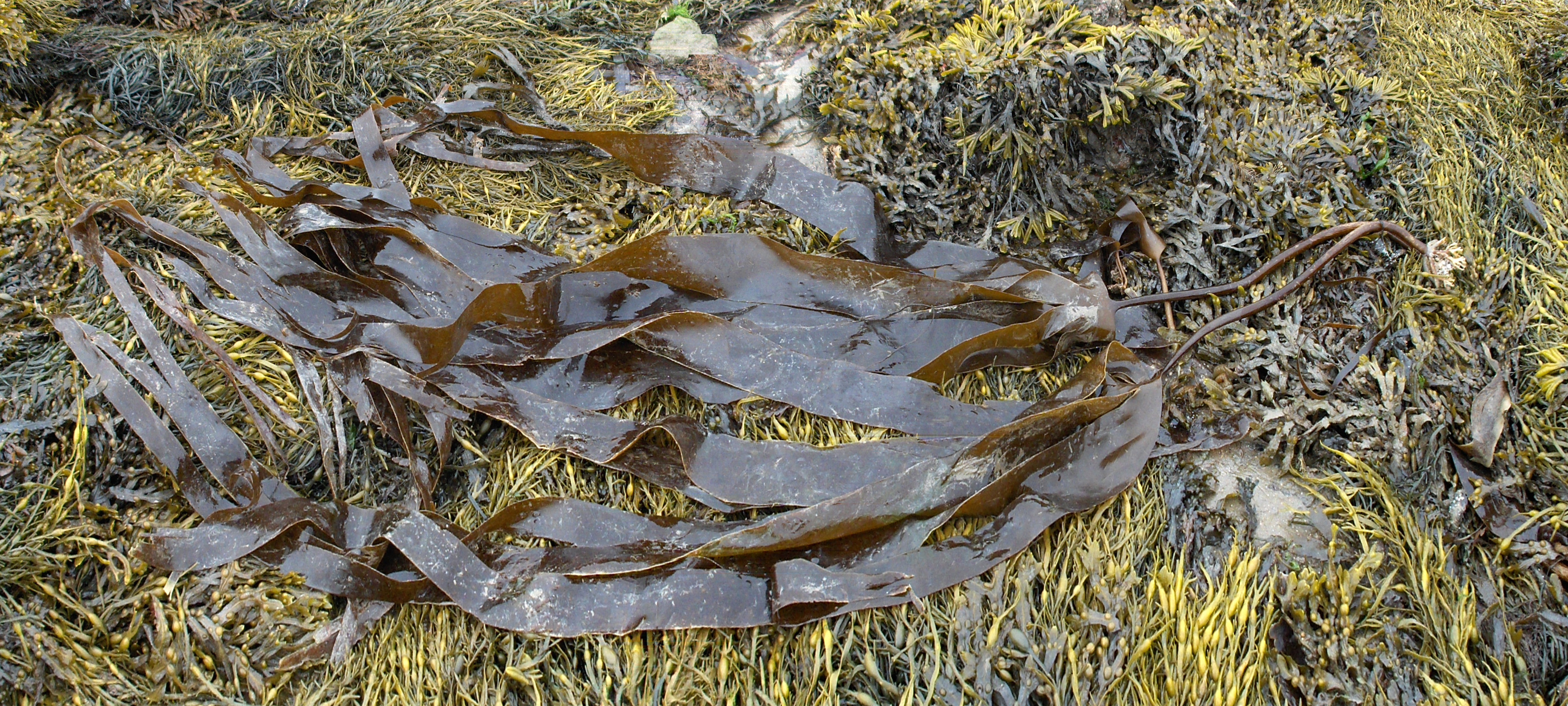

Scientific classification
- Domain: Eukaryota
- Clade: Sar
- Clade: Stramenopiles
- Division: Ochrophyta
- Class: Phaeophyceae
- Order: Laminariales
- Family: Laminariaceae
- Genus: Laminaria
- Species: L. digitata

Binomial name
- Laminaria digitata (Huds.) Lamouroux, 1813

Synonyms
- Gigantea digitata (Hudson) Stackhouse, 1816

= Laminaria digitata =

Species of alga

Laminaria digitata is a large brown alga in the family Laminariaceae, also known by the common name oarweed. It is found in the sublittoral zone of the northern Atlantic Ocean.

== Description ==
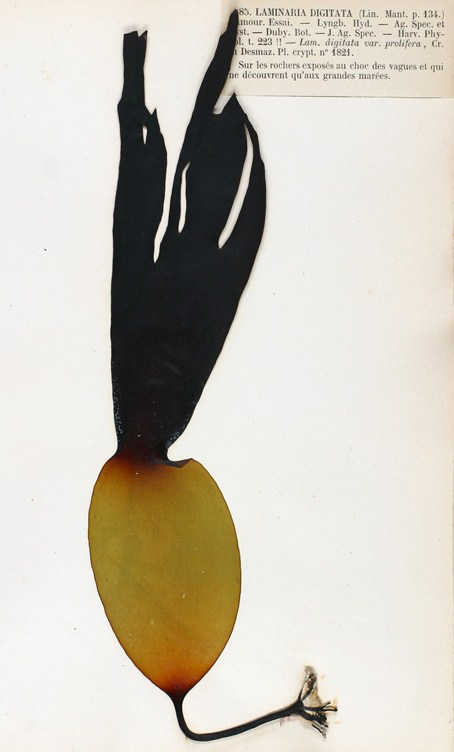
Laminaria digitata

Laminaria digitata is a tough, leathery, dark brown seaweed that grows to 2 or 3 metres (6 1/2 or 10 ft) long. The holdfast which anchors it to the rock is conical and has a number of spreading root-like protrusions called rhizoids. The stipe or stalk is flexible and oval in cross section and may be over 1 inch in diameter and grow to 1.5 metres (5 ft) in length. The blade is large and shaped like the palm of a hand with a number of more or less regular finger-like segments. This seaweed can be distinguished from the rather similar Laminaria hyperborea by being darker in colour and having a shorter stipe that does not easily snap when bent.

== Reproduction ==
The life cycle is of the large diploid sporophytes and microscopic gametophytes. Spores develop in sori which occur over the central part of the blade.

== Distribution ==
Laminaria digitata occurs in the north west Atlantic from Greenland south to Cape Cod and in the north east Atlantic from northern Russia and Iceland south to France. It is common round the coasts of the British Isles except for much of the east coast of England.

== Ecology ==
Laminaria digitata is found mostly on exposed sites on shores in the lower littoral where it may form extensive meadows and can be the dominant algal species. It has a fairly high intrinsic growth rate compared to other algae, 5.5% per day, and a carrying capacity of about 40 kg wet weight per square meter. It may reach lengths of about 4 m (13 ft). It overlaps to a small degree in distribution with Fucus serratus and Alaria esculenta. It is highly susceptible to grazing by sea urchins, among other species. It has low and high light limitation values of about 5 and 70 W per square meter respectively. Its distribution is also limited by salinity, wave exposure, temperature, desiccation and general stress. These and other attributes of the alga are summarized in the publications listed below.

It is a known host of the pathogenic fungus Phycomelaina laminariae.

== Uses ==
Laminaria digitata is harvested offshore of France, Morocco and Ireland. Mostly it is used for manufacturing alginic acid. It is used as an ingredient in some cosmetics or (such as in Northern Ireland, Rathlin island) as an ingredient for food industry.

It was traditionally used as a fertiliser and spread on the land. In the 18th century it was burnt to extract the potash it contained for use in the glass industry. In the 19th century it was used for the extraction of iodine.

Historically, the dried stalks of L. digitata, called sea-tangle tents were used in traditional medicine as an abortifacient and for mechanically inducing labour.
