= Laminarid =

Laminarid is a blend of polysaccharides, proteins and salts of alginic acid obtained from sea cabbage (Laminariae thalli). It is an osmotic laxative.
