= Divinylether fatty acids =

Class of chemical compounds

Chemical structure of colneleic acid

Divinylether fatty acids contain a fatty acid chemically combined with a doubly unsaturated carbon chain linked by an oxygen atom (ether).

Fatty acid hydroperoxides generated by plant lipoxygenases from linoleic and linolenic acids are known to serve as substrates for a divinyl ether synthase which produces divinyl ether fatty acids. Divinyl ethers were detected only within the plant kingdom.

The discovery of that class of compounds dates to 1972, when the structures of two ether C18 fatty acids generated by homogenates of the potato tuber were described. These compounds, named colneleic acid (from linoleic acid) and colnelenicacid (from linolenic acid), could be also produced in potato leaves and tomato roots by rearrangement of 9-hydroperoxides.

Isomers of colneleic acid and colnelenic acid were isolated from homogenates of leaves of Clematis vitalba (Ranunculaceae).

Similarly, 13-lipoxygenase-generated hydroperoxides serve as precursor of other divinyl ether fatty acids which are produced in bulbs of garlic or Ranunculus leaves. These compounds were named etheroleic and etherolenic acids. Etheroleic acid has systematic name 12-[1′E-hexenyloxy]-9Z,11Z-dodecadienoic acid. Etherolenic acid has systematic name (9Z,11E,1'E,3'Z)-12-(1',3'-Hexadienyloxy)-9,11-dodecadienoic acid.

The physiological significance of divinyl ethers is still not fully studied. As infection of potato leaves leads to increased levels of divinyl ether synthase, it was suggested that this pathway could be of importance in the defense of plants against attacking pathogens. Similar structures have been discovered in the brown alga Laminaria sinclairii, with 18 or 20 carbons and 4, 5 or 6 double bonds, and in the red alga Polyneura latissima, with 20 carbons and 5 double bonds.
