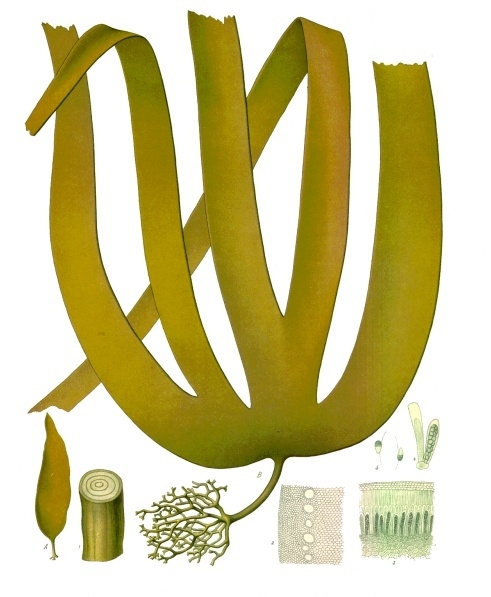
- Laminaria hyperborea

Scientific classification
- Domain: Eukaryota
- Supergroup: Stramenopiles
- Division: Ochrophyta
- Class: Phaeophyceae
- Order: Laminariales
- Family: Laminariaceae
- Genus: Laminaria; J. V. Lamouroux

Species
- ca. 30 species; see text

Synonyms
- Gigantea Stackhouse; Hafgygia Kützing

= Laminaria =

Genus of algae

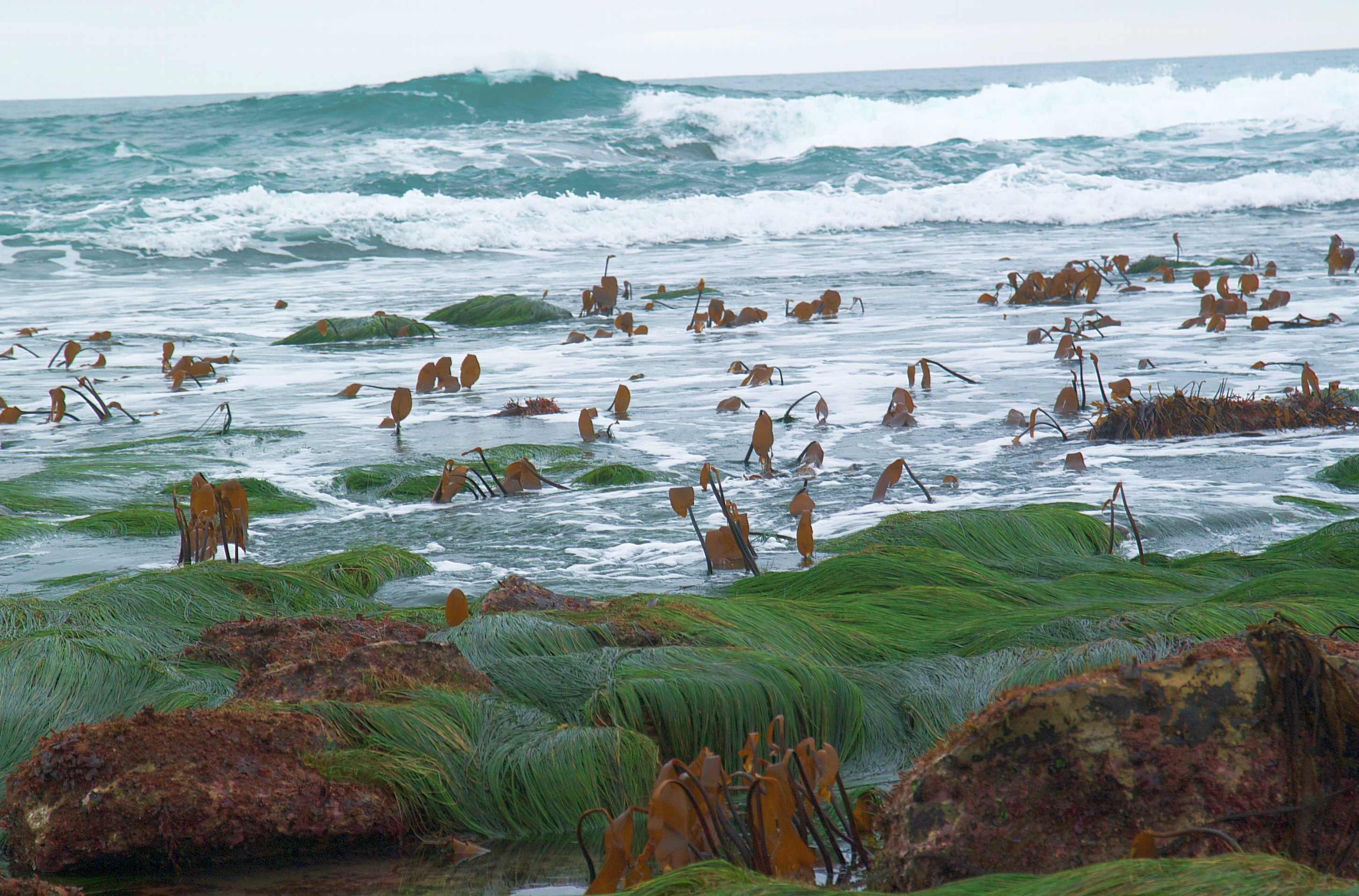
Laminaria setchellii at Montana de Oro State Park

Laminaria is a genus of brown seaweed in the order Laminariales (kelp), comprising 31 species native to the north Atlantic and northern Pacific Oceans. This economically important genus is characterized by long, leathery laminae and relatively large size. Some species are called Devil's apron, due to their shape, or sea colander, due to the perforations present on the lamina. Others are referred to as tangle. Laminaria form a habitat for many fish and invertebrates.

The life cycle of Laminaria has heteromorphic alternation of generations which differs from Fucus. At meiosis the male and female zoospores are produced separately, then germinate into male and female gametophytes. The female egg matures in the oogonium until the male sperm fertilizes it. Life-Cycle: The most apparent form of Laminaria is its sporophyte phase, a structure composed of the holdfast, the stipe, and the blades. While it spends its time predominately in the sporophyte phase, it alternates between the sporophyte and its microscopic gametophyte phase.

Laminaria japonica (J. E. Areschoug – Japón) is now regarded as a synonym of Saccharina japonica and Laminaria saccharina is now classified as Saccharina latissima.

== History ==
Laminaria arrived in China from Hokkaido, Japan in the late 1920s. Once in China, Laminaria was cultivated on a much larger industrial scale. The rocky shores at Dalian, the northern coast of the Yellow Sea, along with its cold waters provided excellent growing conditions for these species. Laminaria was harvested for food and 1949 yielded 40.3 metric tons of dry weight. Laminaria need cold water to survive and can only live above 36° N latitude.

In 1949, the Chinese started to commercially grow laminaria as a crop. This increased the production of dry weight to 6,200 metric tons. Farming laminaria is still a large production for China. However, since the 1980s production has dropped due to new mariculture technology .

== Farming practices ==
Laminaria is generally farmed using the floating raft method, in which young laminaria sporophytes are attached to submerged ropes. These ropes are then attached to floating rafts.

== Ecology ==
Laminaria is found in colder ocean waters, such as arctic regions. Preferring to stay in regions where there are rocky shores, this allows the laminaria to attach. Due to the height of the Laminaria, they provide protection for creatures that the open ocean does not often give. Invertebrates are just one of the organisms that live among the algae. Sea snails and other invertebrates feed on the blades (leaves) of the laminaria. Other organisms, such as sea urchins, feed on the holdfasts, which can kill the algae. Red sea urchins, found on the North America Pacific Coast, can decimate kelp, including Laminaria, if the urchins are not managed by sea otters. Species such as Coelopa pilipes feed and lay eggs on Laminaria when it is washed up on beaches.

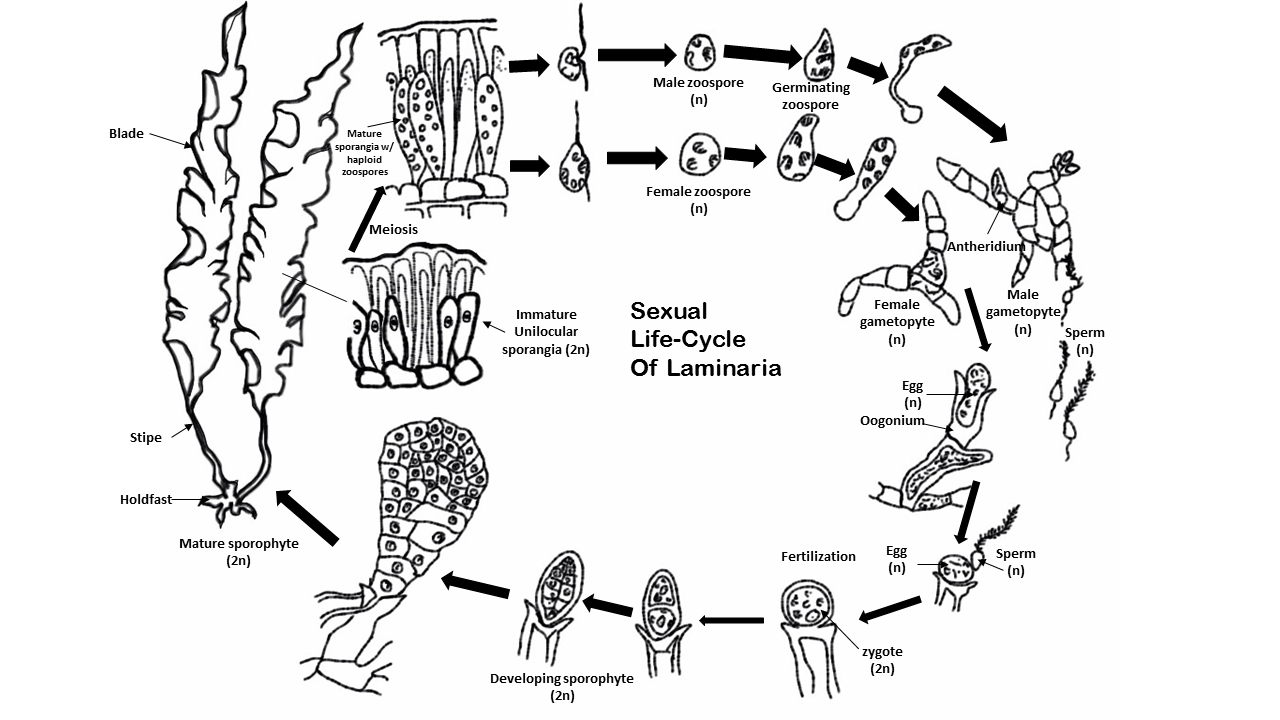
The sexual life cycle of Laminaria

== Life cycle ==
Laminaria expresses a haplo-diplophasic life history, in which it alternates from a macroscopic thallic sporophyte structure, consisting of the holdfast, a stipe, and the blades, to a filamentous, microscopic gametophyte. The sporophyte structure of laminaria can grow to 7 metres (23 ft), which is large in comparison to other algae, but still smaller than the giant kelps such as Macrocystis and Nereocystis, which can grow up to 40–50 metres (130–160 ft). On the other hand, the gametophyte structure is no more than a few millimeters in length. In opposition to the gametophyte phase, which only consists of one type of tissue, the more complex sporophyte phase is made up of different types of tissue. One of these tissues includes a sieve-like element which translocates photoassimilates. These structures are very similar to mesophyll cells found in higher plant leaves.

== Uses ==
=== Medical ===
A laminaria stick may be used to slowly dilate the cervix to induce labor, or for surgical procedures including abortions or to facilitate the placement of an intrauterine device. The stick is made up of a bundle of dried and compressed laminaria that expands as water is absorbed.

Laminaria is a source of iodine, which is commonly used to promote thyroid health.

=== Food ===
Various species of Laminaria have been used for food purposes since ancient times wherever humans have encountered them. Typically, the prepared parts, usually the blade, are consumed either immediately after boiling in broth or water, or consumed after drying. The greater proportion of commercial cultivation is for algin, iodine, and mannitol, which are used in a range of industrial applications. In South Korea it is processed into a sweetmeat known as laminaria jelly, in other countries it is also used in fresh salad form, which is also canned for preservation for deliverу and selling purposes in other regions. Many countries produce and consume laminaria products, the largest being China.

=== Energy ===
Due to their ability to grow underwater and in salt water, algae are being looked into as a source of biofuel. Laminaria is one of the five macroalgae farmed for products such as food, chemicals and power. Those five genera contribute to 76% of the total tonnage for farmed macroalgae. Laminaria is less desired as a renewable energy source due to its high ash content when burned. Laminaria has an ash content of 33%, while wood has about a 2% ash content when burned. Algae have a high water content requiring much energy to dry the algae before being able to properly use it.

More research is being done with anaerobic digestion, which is the most promising practice to extract energy from Laminaria. There are still barriers to overcome before moving forward with anaerobic digestion, such as its cost per kwh.

=== Metal absorption ===
The ability of laminaria, along with other brown algae, to absorb heavy metals is a current area of interest regarding their use to remove heavy metals from wastewater. Laminaria has been shown by recent research to have a favorable mannuronic/guluronic acid residues ratio (M/G ratio) for heavy metal absorption in its alginate. This M/G ratio is the ratio between the L-guluronate (G) and D-mannuronate (M) in the alginate, a natural anionic polymer that is found in all brown algae. This alginate is able to form a gel that contains carboxyl groups that can bind heavy metal cations such as Cu^{2+}, Cd^{2+}, and Pb^{2+}, thereby allowing these metals to be removed from wastewater.

== Predator ==
Coelopa frigida and related flies from the genus Coelopa are known to feed, mate, and create habitats out of different species of Laminaria. This is of particular notice when the Laminaria is stranded on the beach and not when it is submerged under seawater. With increasing amounts of seaweed washing up on shores, there is an increasing recognition of Laminaria and their close pairing with Coelopa.

== Species ==
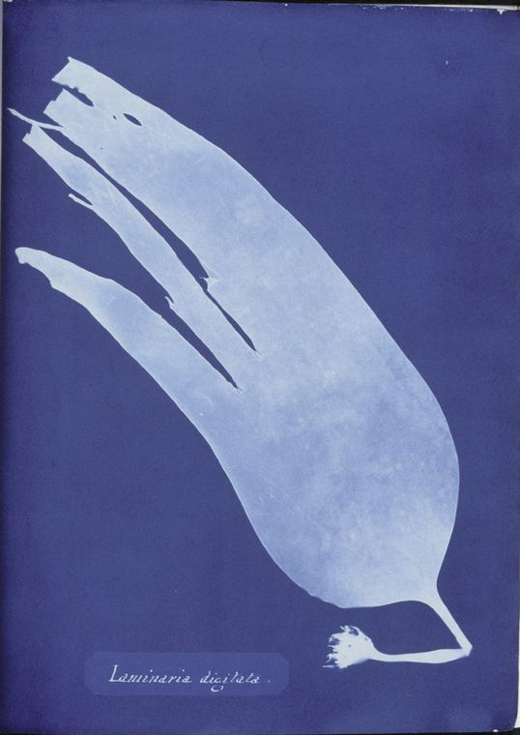
Laminaria digitata, Cyanotype by Anna Atkins, 1843

- Laminaria abyssalis A.B. Joly & E.C. Oliveira – South American Atlantic
- Laminaria agardhii Kjellman – North American Atlantic
- Laminaria appressirhiza J. E. Petrov & V. B. Vozzhinskaya
- Laminaria brasiliensis A. B. Loly & E. C. Oliveira
- Laminaria brongardiana Postels & Ruprecht
- Laminaria bulbosa J. V. Lamouroux
- Laminaria bullata Kjellman
- Laminaria complanata (Setchell & N. L. Garder) Muenscher
- Laminaria digitata (Hudson) J. V. Lamouroux
- Laminaria ephemera Setchell – Pacific of North America: From Vancouver to California
- Laminaria farlowii Setchell – Coast of the North American Pacific
- Laminaria groenlandica – British Columbia
- Laminaria hyperborea (Gunnerus) Foslie – Northeast Atlantic, Baltic Sea and North Sea.
- Laminaria inclinatorhiza J. Petrov & V. Vozzhinskaya
- Laminaria longipes Bory de Saint-Vincent, 1826
- Laminaria multiplicata J. Petrov & M. Suchovejeva
- Laminaria nigripes J. Agardh
- Laminaria ochroleuca Bachelot de la Pylaie
- Laminaria pallida Greville – South Africa, Indian Ocean, Canary Islands and Tristán da Cunha
- Laminaria platymeris Bachelot de la Pylaie
- Laminaria rodriguezii Barnet
- Laminaria ruprechtii (Areschoug) Setchell
- Laminaria sachalinensis (Miyabe) Miyabe
- Laminaria setchellii P. C. Silva
- Laminaria sinclairii (Harvey ex J. D. Hooker & Harvey) Farlow, Anderson & Eaton – North American Pacific coast
- Laminaria solidungula J. Agardh
- Laminaria yezoensis Miyabe
