= Pleurophycus gardneri =

Scientific classification
- Domain: Eukaryota
- Clade: Diaphoretickes
- Clade: SAR
- Clade: Stramenopiles
- Phylum: Gyrista
- Subphylum: Ochrophytina
- Class: Phaeophyceae
- Order: Laminariales
- Family: Alariaceae
- Genus: Pleurophycus
- Species: P. gardneri

Binomial name
- Pleurophycus gardneri Setchell & Saunders ex Tilden

Species of brown alga

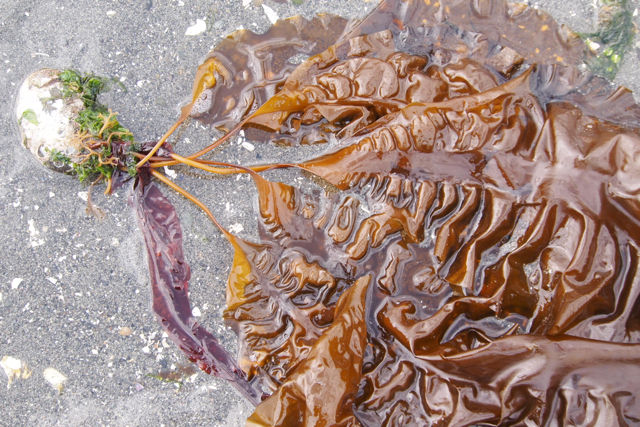

Pleurophycus gardneri is a species of brown alga. It is a deciduous kelp, primarily found in lower, rocky inter-tidal and shallow, rocky sub-tidal locations and is one of the most abundant kelps found within the Pleurophycus Zone (roughly 30-45m depth). It is not commonly present deeper in the ocean than 30m and is considered a stipitate kelp. P. gardneri forms aggregates of densities up to 10m^{−2} . These kelp beds reside below giant kelp forests, and were therefore often overlooked by researchers for many years. This kelp has a range from Central California to British Columbia, Canada, with a lifespan of only 3 – 6 years.

The family of P. gardneri was previously believed to be Laminariaceae and not Alariaceae, but molecular data supports this particular kelp to be of the family Alariaceae. P. gardneri has been referred to as Tender Kelp (1980) or Sea spatula (1985).

== Interactions with other species ==
Pleurophycus gardneri is a habitat to many species of amphipod, and most commonly supports species specific to stipe burrowing. Amphipods decrease the lifespan of this kelp due to damages caused by burrowing; any breaks in the plants' holdfast up to its stipe will kill the plant, hence its heightened mortality rate due to stipe burrowing amphipods. Breaks above the abscission zone of the plants' frond will not kill the plant, but may still decrease fitness.

== Reproduction ==
Pleurophycus gardneri reproduces in the same way as all other kelp. It has diploid sporophytes and a microscopic haploid gametophyte stage. Mature algal blades have a thick mid-rib which contain sori for reproduction. A sorus is able to produce gametes for the kelp.

== Perennial characteristics ==
Mature algal blades have a length of roughly 150 cm. Annual banding can be found in the stipe of the plant due to its deciduous nature, which researchers often use to identify plant age. P. gardneri loses all foliage by late fall and then soon thereafter (after a roughly two-week dormancy) begins to grow new blades. For new blades to begin growing, light must be present. Premature blade deterioration and breakages were seen as a direct result of warmed ocean temperatures. It is believed that temperatures around 14-15 C trigger blade deterioration. Following an El Niño, this kelp was recorded to have prematurely dropped blades.
