= Lamina (algae) =

Macroscopic algae

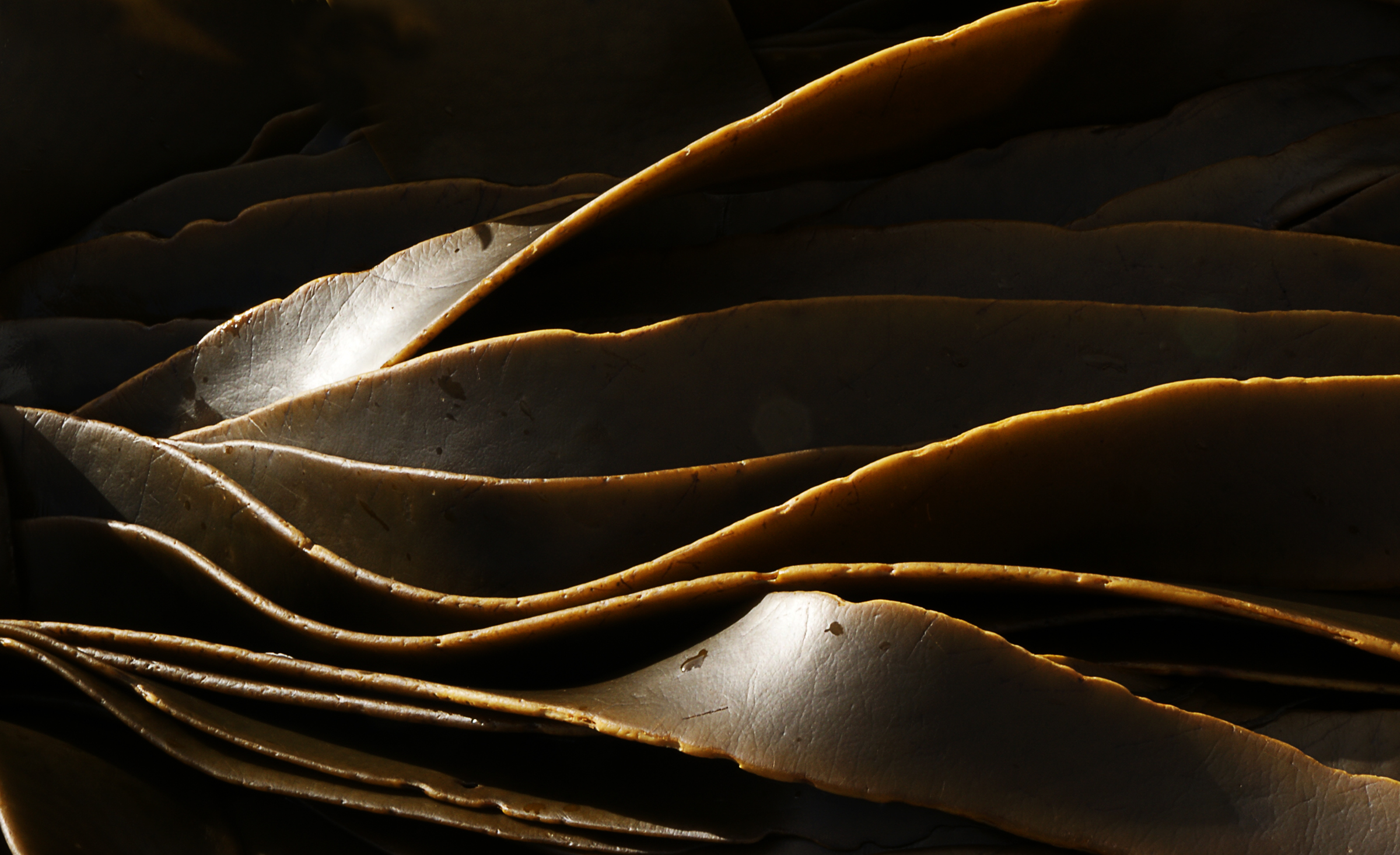
Several kelp laminae

The lamina or blade in macroscopic algae, like seaweed, is a generally flattened structure that typically forms the principal bulk of the thallus. It is often developed into specialised organs such as flotation bladders and reproductive organs.

The lamina is typically an expansion of the stipe which in term is attached to the substrate by the holdfast.
