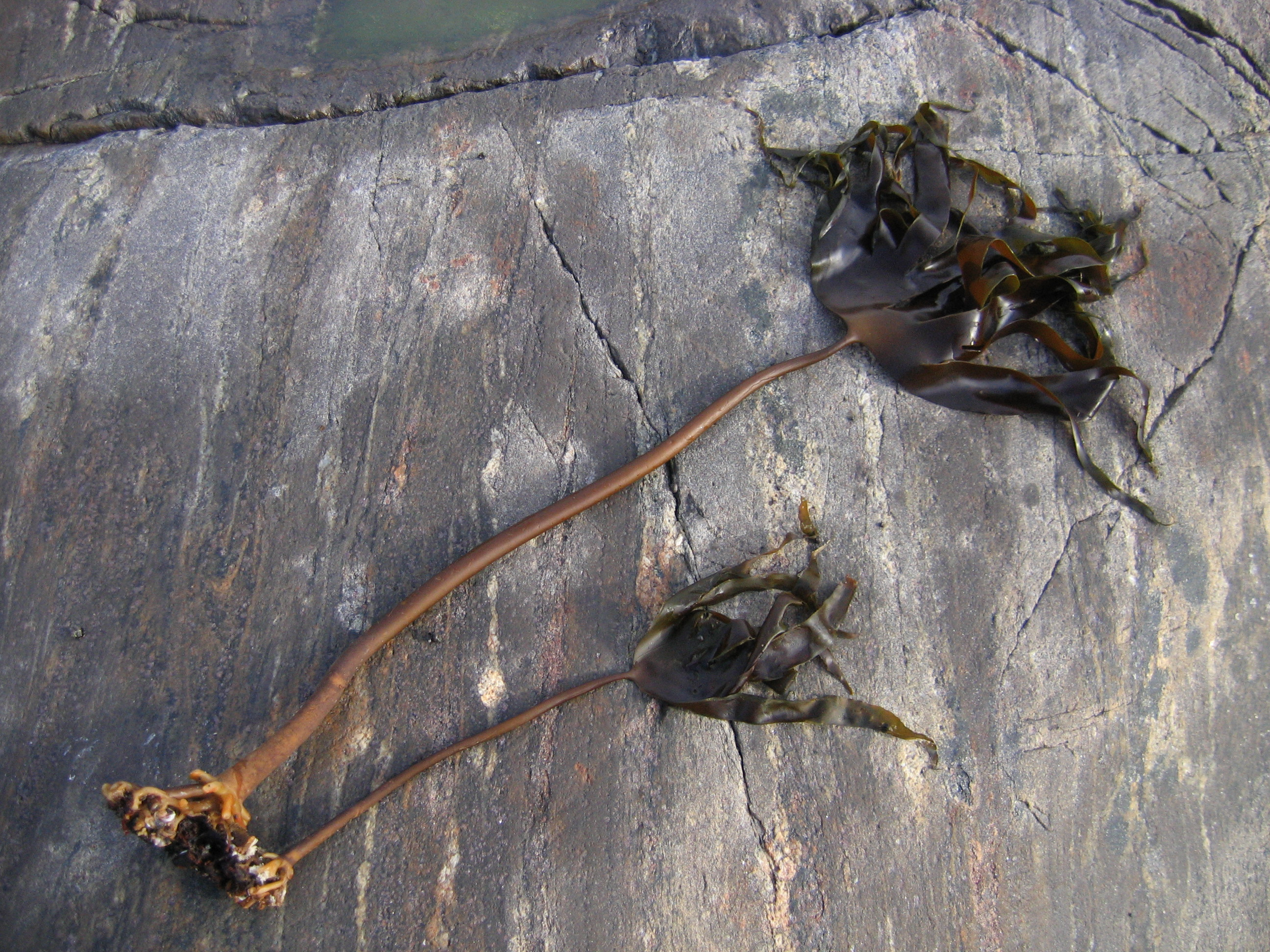

Scientific classification
- Domain: Eukaryota
- Supergroup: Stramenopiles
- Division: Ochrophyta
- Class: Phaeophyceae
- Order: Laminariales
- Family: Laminariaceae
- Genus: Laminaria
- Species: L. hyperborea

Binomial name
- Laminaria hyperborea (Gunnerus) Foslie, 1884

Synonyms
- Fucus hyperboreus Gunnerus, 1766; Laminaria cloustonii Edmondston, 1845; Laminaria hyperborea f. compressa Foslie, 1884

= Laminaria hyperborea =

Species of alga

Laminaria hyperborea is a species of large brown alga, a kelp in the family Laminariaceae, also known by the common names of tangle and cuvie. It is found in the sublittoral zone of the northern Atlantic Ocean. A variety, Laminaria hyperborea f. cucullata (P.Svensden & J.M.Kain, 1971) is known from more wave sheltered areas in Scandinavia.

== Description ==
Laminaria hyperborea is a massive, leathery seaweed, up to 360 cm long. The holdfast is large and cone-shaped, with branched rhizoids, looking rather like a bird's foot. The stipe is circular in cross section, rough, thick at the base and tapering upwards. Older stipes are often covered with epiphytic red algae. The laminate blade is deeply divided into linear segments and is yellowish brown with large digitate segments. It is a long-lived species and has been recorded as surviving for 15 years.

Laminaria hyperborea can be distinguished from the rather similar L. digitata by being paler in colour and having a longer stipe which snaps when it is bent sharply. Laminaria ochroleuca is also similar but is more yellow in colour and does not have the rough stipe found in L. hyperborea.

== Distribution and habitat ==
The range is the northeast Atlantic Ocean (including the Baltic and North Seas), from the North Cape, Norway and the Kola Peninsula south to central Portugal.

Laminaria hyperborea grows on rocks in the sublittoral zone at depths down to about 10 m (35 ft) in turbid waters and down to 30 m (100 ft) where the water is clear. It tends to be the dominant species in a narrow zone near low-water at spring tides. It also predominates in deeper waters on stable substrates in eave exposed areas while Saccharina latissima tends to be dominant in sheltered areas or those with less stable substrates. Down to about 15 m (50 ft) the growth may be very dense and may be referred to as a "kelp forest" but at greater depths there is a more open community and these areas have been referred to as "parks".

== Biology ==
In young individuals of L. hyperborea, the annual growth consists mainly of the enlargement of the blade. This maximises the photosynthetic opportunity while the plant's low stature causes it to be overshadowed. In later years, more growth takes place in the stipe and holdfast. A new frond grows annually in the spring from the top of the stipe. The old frond is sloughed off later after much of its nutrient content has been transferred to the new growth.

Laminaria hyperborea can liberate upward of a million zoospores from sori on the surface of the blade during the course of a few weeks during the winter. These have flagella and settle after about 24 hours before developing into microscopic gametophytes which become fertile in about 10 days. Male gametophytes release large quantities of motile sperm, apparently stimulated to do so by the release of female gametes by the female gametophytes in the vicinity. The fertilised zygotes germinate into young sporophytes which will grow into the mature seaweed. Sexual reproduction is dependent on a minimum quantity of blue light; under less than optimal conditions, the gametophytes may develop vegetatively instead.

== Ecology ==
Kelp beds provide a nursery area for many marine species and a biodiverse habitat. The grazing behaviour of sea urchins, particularly the green sea urchin, Strongylocentrotus droebachiensis, restricts the development of new growth of L. hyperborea. If the urchins become too numerous, whole areas normally dominated by kelp may become "urchin barrens", denuded of kelp and supporting a much less biodiverse community based on encrusting coralline algae.

Laminaria hyperborea is host to a large and diverse community of invertebrates. In one study in Norway, up to 238 species of benthic macrofauna were found associated with it, with a density of 8000 individuals per kelp plant. The blades were the part of the plant least populated by invertebrates. They were however covered by a bacterial biofilm in which Planctomycetota and Alphaproteobacteria were found all year long and other bacteria occurred seasonally. The stipes, being rough, provided good anchor points for Palmaria palmata and several other species of red algae. The resulting epiphytic growth was home to a range of species of gastropods, amphipods and other invertebrates. Depending upon the season and density of the L. hyperborea bed, the total number of these animals varied; at one location, it ranged from a small number to over 80,000 individuals living on a single stipe. The holdfasts offered a sheltered refuge and housed a large number of mobile macrofauna, a community that was quite different from that on the stipes.

In a study undertaken on the north east coast of Britain, 61 different species of nematode were found living in the holdfasts of L. hyperborea. The majority of these were omnivores feeding on deposits or herbivores feeding on the epiphytic algae growing on the kelp.

In another study comparing the macrofauna resident in the holfasts of L. hyperborea round the coasts of Britain, it was found that, except for the suspension feeders, there was an inverse relationship between the richness of the flora and the pollution, as measured by the heavy metal content of the water, and its clarity.

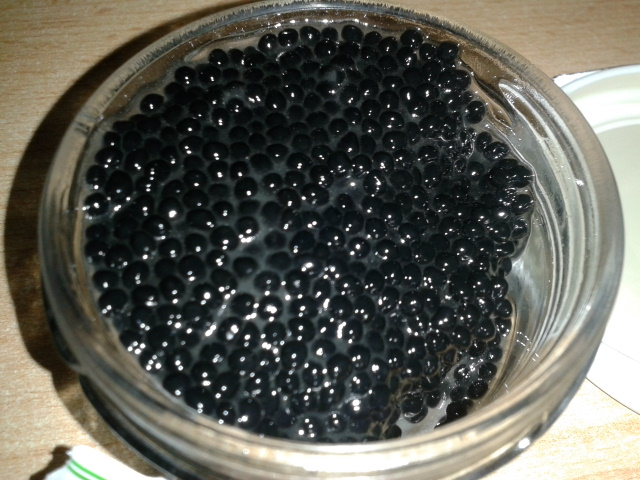
A jar of vegetarian imitation caviar made from L. hyperborea.

== Uses ==
The calorific values and biomass of L. hyperborea have been studied with regard to its possible use as a fuel. A study found that it could produce annual increases in biomass of 16.5 and 8.0 metric tons of organic matter per hectare at depths of 3 and 9 metres respectively.

Alginates can be extracted from L. hyperborea. In France, Ireland, Scotland and Norway, stipes cast up on beaches are collected for this purpose and in Norway some kelp is harvested by trawling.

Because of its ability to absorb and retain water, L. hyperborea has been used in wound dressings to prevent adhesions. It has also been used to help dilate the cervix during childbirth.

Laminaria hyperborea can also be used for human consumption. For example, it is used to make vegetarian (vegan) imitation caviar.
