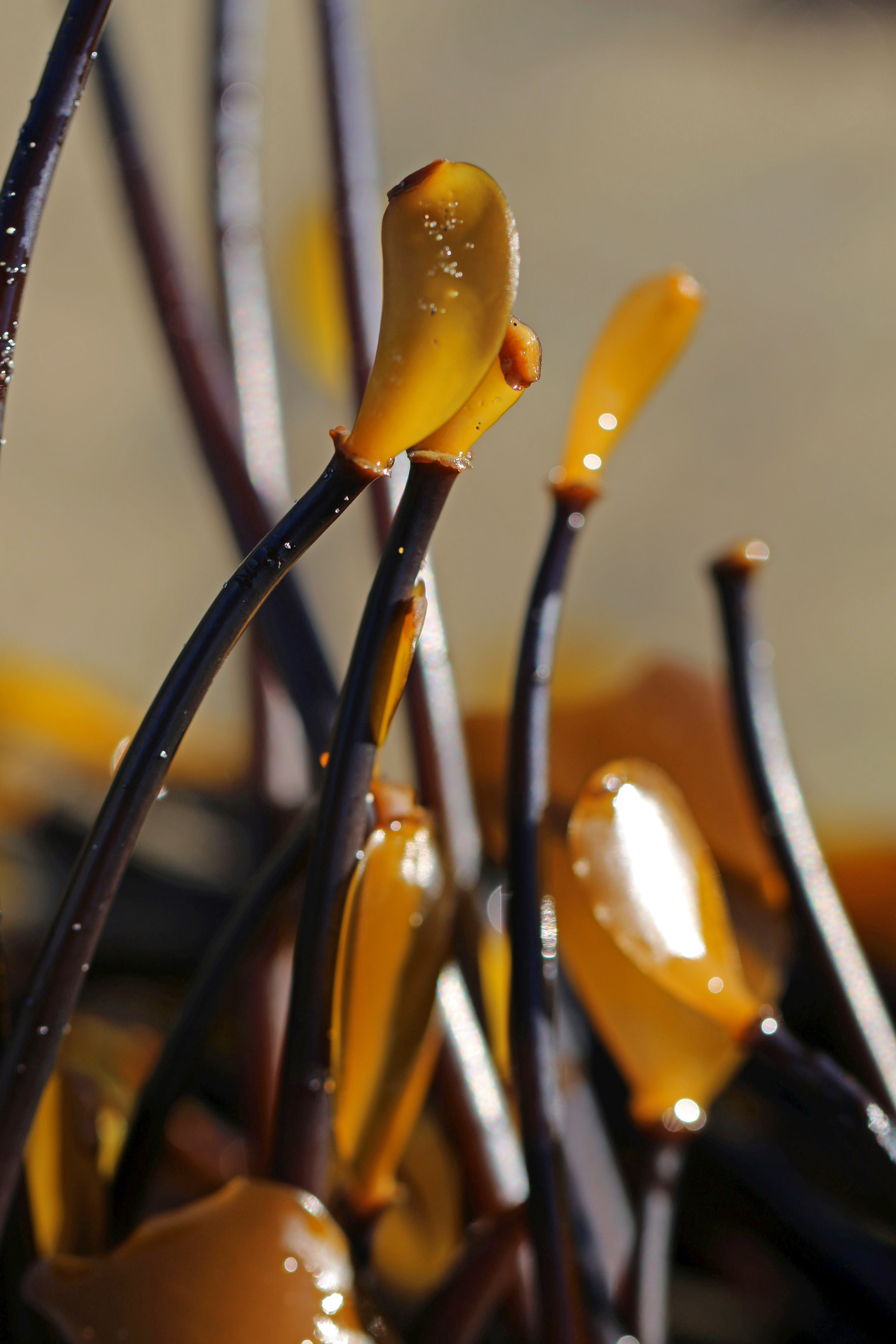

Scientific classification
- Domain: Eukaryota
- Clade: Sar
- Clade: Stramenopiles
- Division: Ochrophyta
- Class: Phaeophyceae
- Order: Laminariales
- Family: Laminariaceae
- Genus: Laminaria
- Species: L. sinclairii

Binomial name
- Laminaria sinclairii (Harvey ex J.D.Hooker & Harvey) Farlow, Anderson & Eaton, 1878

Synonyms
- Laminaria andersonii Eaton ex Hervey, 1881; Lessonia sinclairii Harvey ex J.D.Hooker & Harvey, 1847

= Laminaria sinclairii =

Species of seaweed

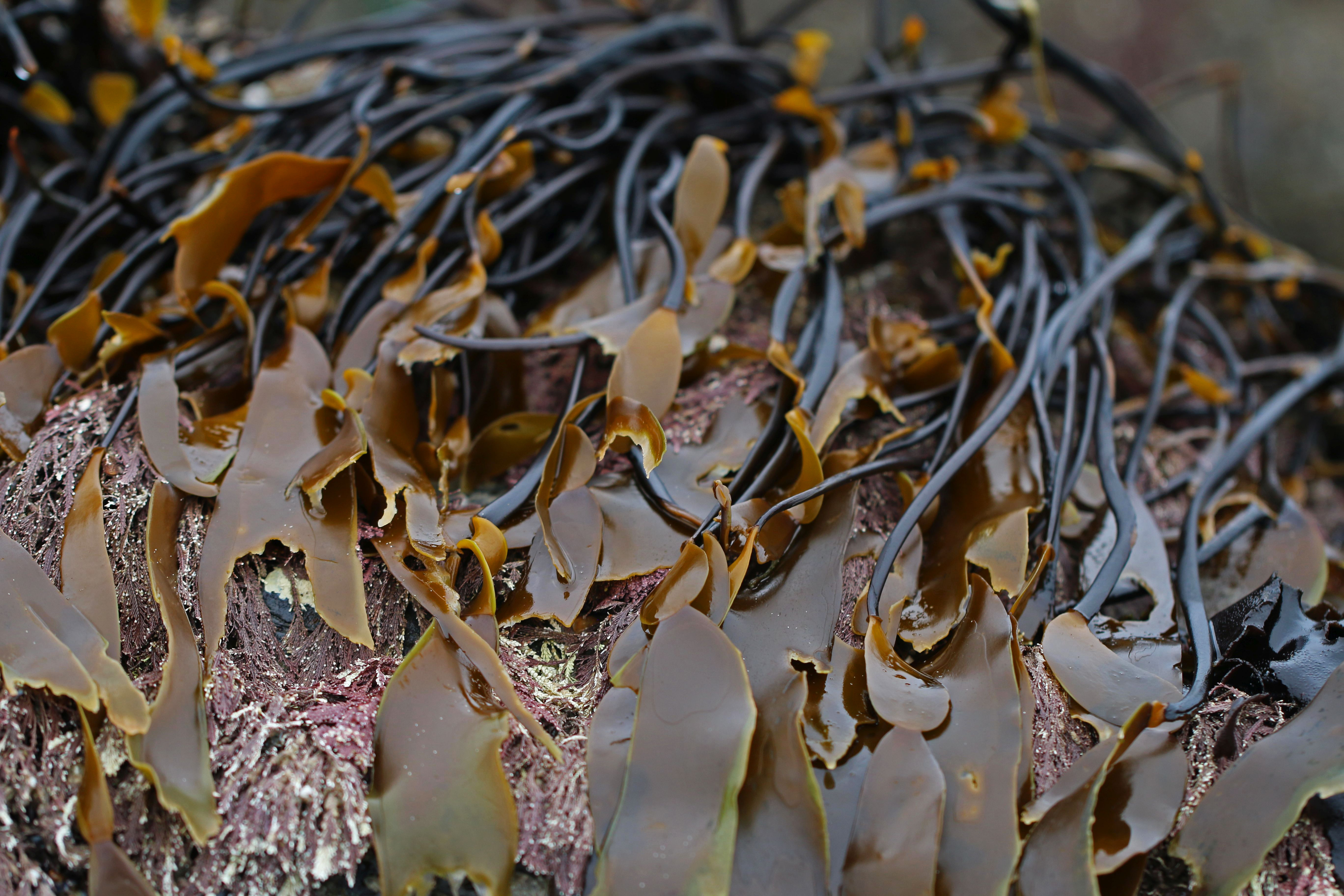
Laminaria sinclairii

Laminaria sinclairii is a species of brown algae (the class Phaeophyceae), in the family Laminariaceae, commonly referred to as "seaweed". It is native to the lower intertidal zone of the northeastern Pacific Ocean from British Columbia southwards to California.

== Description ==
This dark brown, perennial kelp grows from a creeping, branching rhizome which sends up thalli at intervals. The thalli are ribbon-like and grow to a length of about 1 m (3 ft) and width of 3 cm (1.2 in) with a smooth surface and entire edges. They grow on short, cylindrical stipes some 10 cm (4 in) long and 5 mm (0.2 in) wide containing many mucilage ducts. It is very similar in appearance to Laminaria longipes but that species does not have mucilage glands in the stipes. In 1972, the American phycologist James W. Markham did some transplanting experiments to try to determine whether the presence of mucilage glands is a distinctive feature or the two species were identical. He found that they were indeed distinct and that there were some other differences between the two related to the width of blades, the shedding of the blades, the morphology of the reproductive structures, temperature tolerance and habitat preference.

== Distribution and habitat ==
Laminaria sinclairii is found in the northeastern Pacific Ocean, its range extending from Vancouver Island in British Columbia, southwards to Ventura County, California. It occurs on rocky substrates, sometimes partially covered in sand, in the lower part of the intertidal zone.

== Ecology ==
This is the dominant seaweed on rocks in the lower part of the intertidal zone in Oregon on beaches where sand levels fluctuate dramatically at different times of year. In March and April new thalli appear from the rhizomes but these blades are progressively buried by rising sand levels which results in the complete burial of the plants over the summer. With the arrival of storms in the fall, the sand is scoured away and the thalli reappear. Reproductive sori are produced on the old blades before they are shed in December and on the new blades that grow in the spring.
