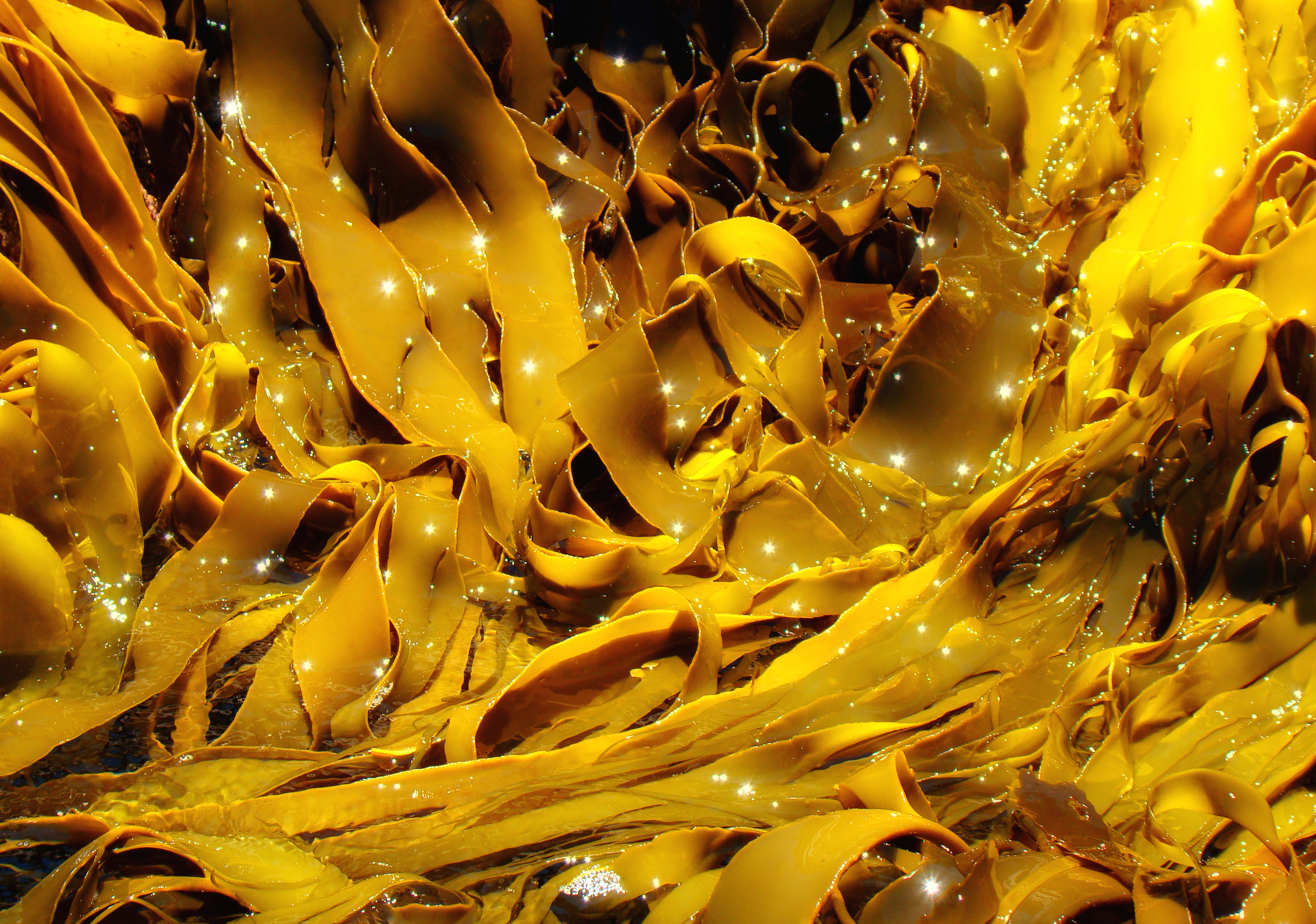

Scientific classification
- Domain: Eukaryota
- Supergroup: Stramenopiles
- Division: Ochrophyta
- Class: Phaeophyceae
- Order: Laminariales; Migula, 1909

Families
- Agaraceae; Akkesiphycaceae; Alariaceae; Aureophycaceae; Chordaceae; Laminariaceae; Lessoniaceae; Pseudochordaceae

= Kelp =

Kelp Temporal range: Lutetian–Present

Large brown seaweeds in the order Laminariales

Kelps are large brown algae or seaweeds that make up the order Laminariales. There are about 30 genera. Despite its appearance and use of photosynthesis in chloroplasts, kelp is not a plant but a stramenopile.

Kelp grows from stalks close together in very dense, forest-like areas under shallow temperate and Arctic oceans. They were previously thought to have appeared in the Miocene, 5 to 23 million years ago based on fossils from California. Kelps were present in the northeastern Pacific Ocean by at least 32 million years ago. These organisms require nutrient-rich water with temperatures between 6 and 14 °C (43 and 57 °F). They are known for their fast growth —the genera Macrocystis and Nereocystis can grow as fast as half a metre a day (that is, about 20 inches a day), ultimately reaching 30 to 80 metres (100 to 260 ft).

Through the 19th century, the word "kelp" was closely associated with seaweeds that could be burned to obtain soda ash (primarily sodium carbonate). The seaweeds used included species from both the orders Laminariales and Fucales. The word "kelp" was also used directly to refer to these processed ashes.

== Description ==
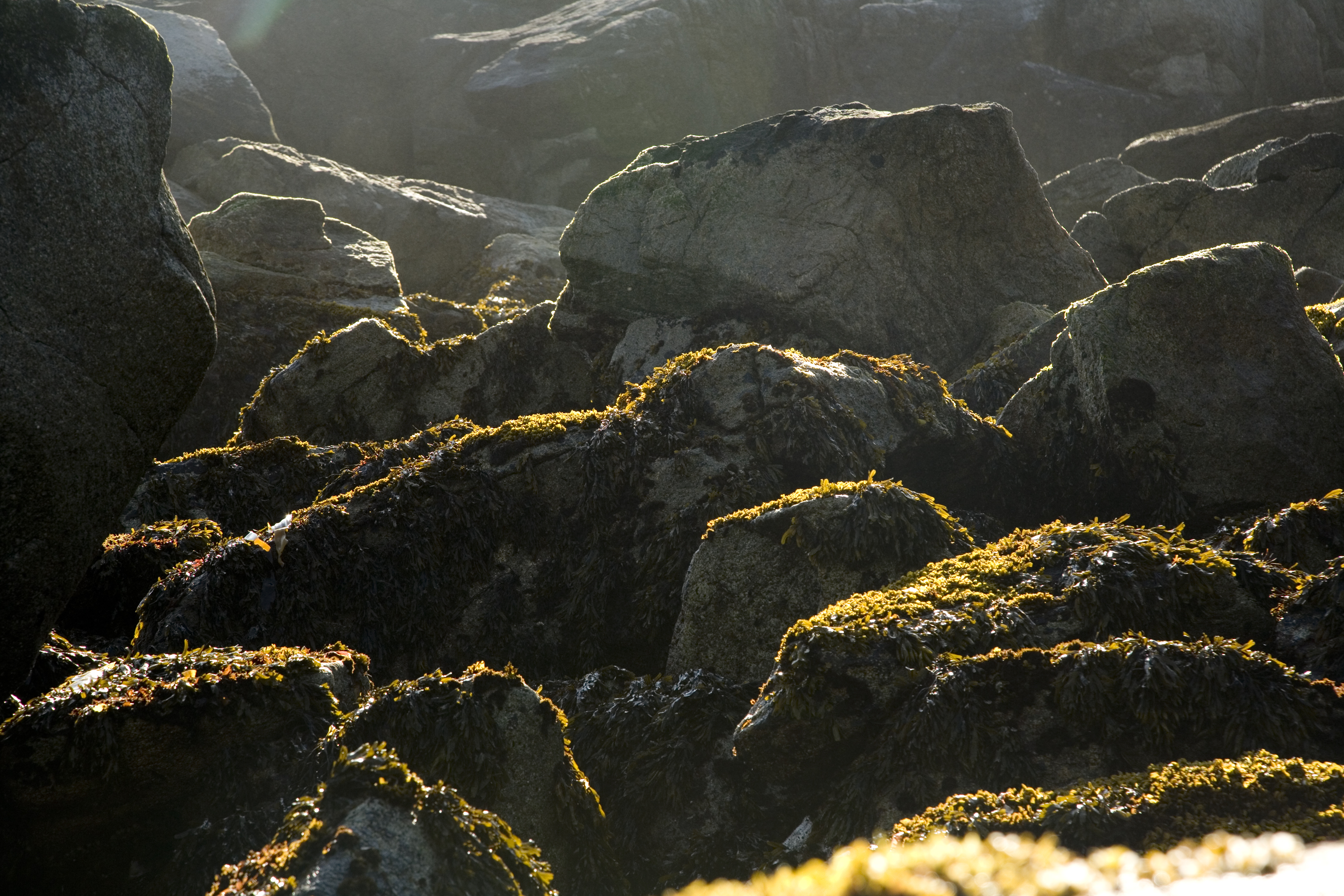
Alaskan beach kelp

The thallus (or body) consists of flat or leaf-like structures known as lamina (or blades) that originate from elongated stem-like structures, referred to as the stipes. A root-like structure (called the holdfast) anchors the kelp to the substrate of the ocean. Gas-filled bladders (pneumatocysts) form at the base of blades of American species, such as Nereocystis lueteana, to hold the kelp blades close to the surface to access light for photosynthesis. (Mert. & Post & Rupr.) The stipes are generally covered with a slimy mucilage layer, rather than a waxy cuticle.

=== Growth and reproduction ===
Growth occurs at the base of the meristem, where the blades and stipe meet. Growth may be limited by grazing. Sea urchins, for example, can reduce entire ecosystems to kelp-less wastelands known as urchin barrens. The kelp life cycle involves a diploid sporophyte and haploid gametophyte stage. The haploid phase begins when the mature organism releases many spores, which then germinate to become male or female gametophytes. Sexual reproduction then results in the beginning of the diploid sporophyte stage, which will develop into a mature individual.

== Taxonomy ==
=== Phylogeny ===
Seaweed were once considered homologues of terrestrial plants, but are only very distantly related to plants, and have evolved plant-like structures through convergent evolution. Where plants have leaves, stems, and reproductive organs, kelp have independently evolved blades, stipes, and sporangia. With radiometric dating and the measure Ma "unequivocal minimum constraint for total group Pinaceae" vascular plants have been measured as having evolved around 419–454 Ma while the ancestors of Laminariales are much younger at 189 Ma. Although these groups are distantly related as well as different in evolutionary age, there are still comparisons that can be made between the structures of terrestrial plants and kelp but in terms of evolutionary history, most of these similarities come from convergent evolution.

Some kelp species including giant kelp, have evolved transport mechanisms for organic as well as inorganic compounds, similar to mechanisms of transport in trees and other vascular plants. In kelp this transportation network uses trumpet-shaped sieve elements (SEs). A 2015 study aimed to evaluate the efficiency of giant kelp (Macrocystis pyrifera) transport anatomy looked at 6 different laminariales species to see if they had typical vascular plant allometric relationships (if SEs had a correlation with the size of an organism). Researchers expected to find the kelp's phloem to work similarly to a plant's xylem and therefore display similar allometric trends to minimize pressure gradient. The study found no universal allometric scaling between all tested structures of the laminariales species which implies that the transport network of brown algae is only just beginning to evolve to efficiently fit their current niches.

Apart from undergoing convergent evolution with plants, species of kelp have undergone convergent evolution within their own phylogeny that has led to niche conservatism. This niche conservatism means that some species of kelp have convergently evolved to share similar niches, as opposed to all species diverging into distinct niches through adaptive radiation. A 2020 study looked at functional traits (blade mass per area, stiffness, strength, etc.) of 14 species of kelp and found that many of these traits evolved convergently across kelp phylogeny. With different species of kelp filling slightly different environmental niches, specifically along a wave disturbance gradient, many of these convergently evolved traits for structural reinforcement also correlate with distribution along that gradient. The wave disturbance gradient that this study refers to is the environments that this kelp inhabit have a varied level of perturbation from the tide and waves that pull at the kelp. It can be assumed from these results that niche partitioning along wave disturbance gradients is a key driver of divergence between closely related kelp.

Due to the often varied and turbulent habitat that kelp populate, plasticity of certain structural traits has been a key for the evolutionary history of the phyla. Plasticity helps with a very important aspect of kelp adaptations to ocean environments, and that is the unusually high levels of morphological homoplasy between lineages. This in fact has made classifying brown algae difficult. Kelp often have similar morphological features to other species within its own area since the roughness of the wave disturbance regime, but can look fairly different from other members of its own species that are found in different wave disturbance regimes. Plasticity in kelps most often involves blade morphology such as the width, ruffle, and thickness of blades. Just one example is the giant bull kelp Nereocystis luetkeana, which have evolved to change blade shape in order to increase drag in water and interception of light when exposed to certain environments. Bull kelp are not unique in this adaptation; many kelp species have evolved a genetic plasticity for blade shapes for different water flow habitats. So individuals of the same species will have differences to other individuals of the same species due to what habitat they grow in. Many species have different morphologies for different wave disturbance regimes but giant kelp Macrocystis integrifolia has been found to have plasticity allowing for 4 distinct types of blade morphology depending on habitat. Where many species only have two or three different blade shapes for maximizing efficiency in only two or three habitats. These different blade shapes were found to decrease breakage and increase ability to photosynthesize. Blade adaptations like these are how kelp have evolved for efficiency in structure in a turbulent ocean environment, to the point where their stability can shape entire habitats. Apart from these structural adaptations, the evolution of dispersal methods relating to structure have been important for the success of kelp as well.

Kelp have had to adapt dispersal methods that can make successful use of ocean currents. Buoyancy of certain kelp structures allows for species to disperse with the flow of water. Certain kelp form kelp rafts, which can travel great distances away from the source population and colonize other areas. The bull kelp genus Durvillaea includes six species, some that have adapted buoyancy and others that have not. Those that have adapted buoyancy have done so thanks to the evolution of a gas filled structure called the pneumatocysts which is an adaptation that allows the kelp to float higher towards the surface to photosynthesize and also aids in dispersal by floating kelp rafts. For Macrocystis pyrifera, adaptation of pneumatocysts and raft forming have made the species dispersal method so successful that the immense spread of coast in which the species can be found has been found to actually be very recently colonized. This can be observed by the low genetic diversity in the subantarctic region. Dispersal by rafts from buoyant species also explains some evolutionary history for non-buoyant species of kelp. Since these rafts commonly have hitchhikers of other diverse species, they provide a mechanism for dispersal for species that lack buoyancy. This mechanism has been recently confirmed to be the cause of some dispersal and evolutionary history for kelp species in a study done with genomic analysis. Studies of kelp structure evolution have helped in the understanding of the adaptations that have allowed for kelp to not only be extremely successful as a group of organisms but also successful as an ecosystem engineer of kelp forests, some of the most diverse and dynamic ecosystems on earth.

=== Prominent species ===
- Bull kelp Nereocystis luetkeana, a northwestern American species. Used by coastal indigenous peoples to create fishing nets.
- Giant kelp Macrocystis pyrifera, the largest seaweed. Found in the Pacific coast of North America and South America, and the Atlantic coast of South Africa (formerly Macrocystis angustifolia).
- Kombu Saccharina japonica (formerly Laminaria japonica) and others, several edible species of kelp found in Japan.
- Golden V kelp Aureophycus aleuticus of the Aleutian Islands.

Species of Laminaria in the British Isles;

- Laminaria digitata (Hudson) J.V. Lamouroux (Oarweed; Tangle)
- Laminaria hyperborea (Gunnerus) Foslie (Curvie)
- Laminaria ochroleuca Bachelot de la Pylaie
- Saccharina latissima (Linnaeus) J.V.Lamouroux (sea belt; sugar kelp; sugarwack)

Species of Laminaria worldwide, listing of species at AlgaeBase:

- Laminaria agardhii (NE. America)
- Laminaria bongardina Postels et Ruprecht (Bering Sea to California)
- Laminaria cuneifolia (NE. America)
- Laminaria dentigera Klellm. (California - America)
- Laminaria digitata (NE. America)
- Laminaria ephemera Setchell (Sitka, Alaska, to Monterey County, California - America)
- Laminaria farlowii Setchell (Santa Cruz, California, to Baja California - America)
- Laminaria groenlandica (NE. America)
- Laminaria longicruris (NE. America)
- Laminaria nigripes (NE. America)
- Laminaria ontermedia (NE. America)
- Laminaria pallida Greville ex J. Agardh (South Africa)
- Laminaria platymeris (NE. America)
- Laminaria saccharina (Linnaeus) Lamouroux, synonym of Saccharina latissima (north east Atlantic Ocean, Barents Sea south to Galicia - Spain)
- Laminaria setchellii Silva (Aleutian Islands, Alaska to Baja California America)
- Laminaria sinclairii (Harvey ex Hooker f. ex Harvey) Farlow, Anderson et Eaton (Hope Island, British Columbia to Los Angeles, California - America)
- Laminaria solidungula (NE. America)
- Laminaria stenophylla (NE. America)

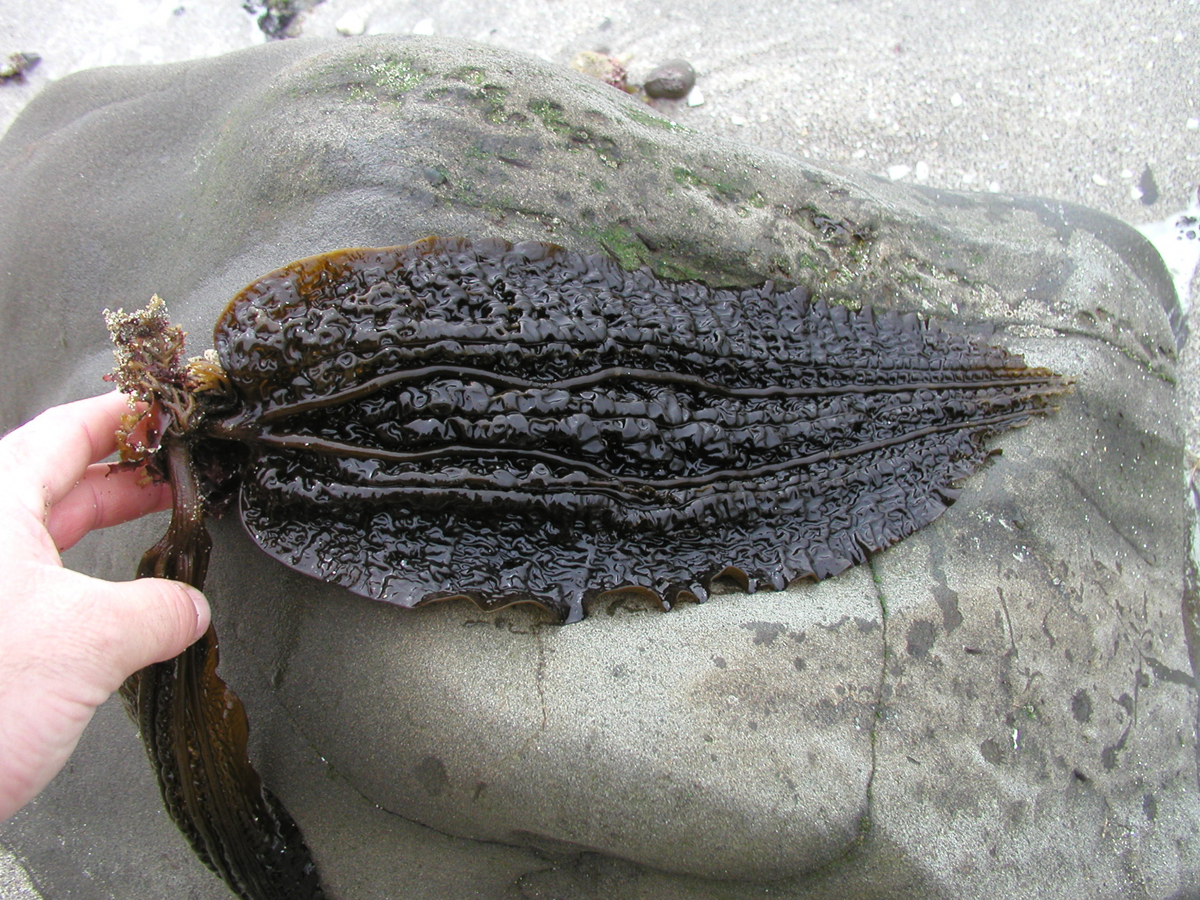
Costaria costata, five-ribbed kelp

Other species in the Laminariales that may be considered as kelp:

- Alaria esculenta (North Atlantic)
- Alaria marginata Post. & Rupr. (Alaska and California - America)
- Costaria costata (C.Ag.) Saunders (Japan; Alaska, California - America)
- Ecklonia brevipes J. Agardh (Australia; New Zealand)
- Ecklonia maxima (Osbeck) Papenfuss (South Africa)
- Ecklonia radiata (C.Agardh) J. Agardh (Australia; Tasmania; New Zealand; South Africa)
- Eisenia arborea Aresch. (Vancouver Island, British Columbia, Montrey, Santa Catalina Island, California - America)
- Egregia menziesii (Turn.) Aresch.
- Hedophyllum sessile (C.Ag.) Setch (Alaska, California - America)
- Macrocystis pyrifera (Linnaeus, C.Agardh) (Australia; Tasmania and South Africa)
- Pleurophycus gardneri Setch. & Saund. (Alaska, California - America)
- Pterygophora californica Rupr. (Vancouver Island, British Columbia to Bahia del Ropsario, Baja California and California - America)

Non-Laminariales species that may be considered as kelp:

- Durvillea antarctica, Fucales (New Zealand, South America, and Australia)
- Durvillea willana, Fucales (New Zealand)
- Durvillaea potatorum (Labillardière) Areschoug, Fucales (Tasmania; Australia)

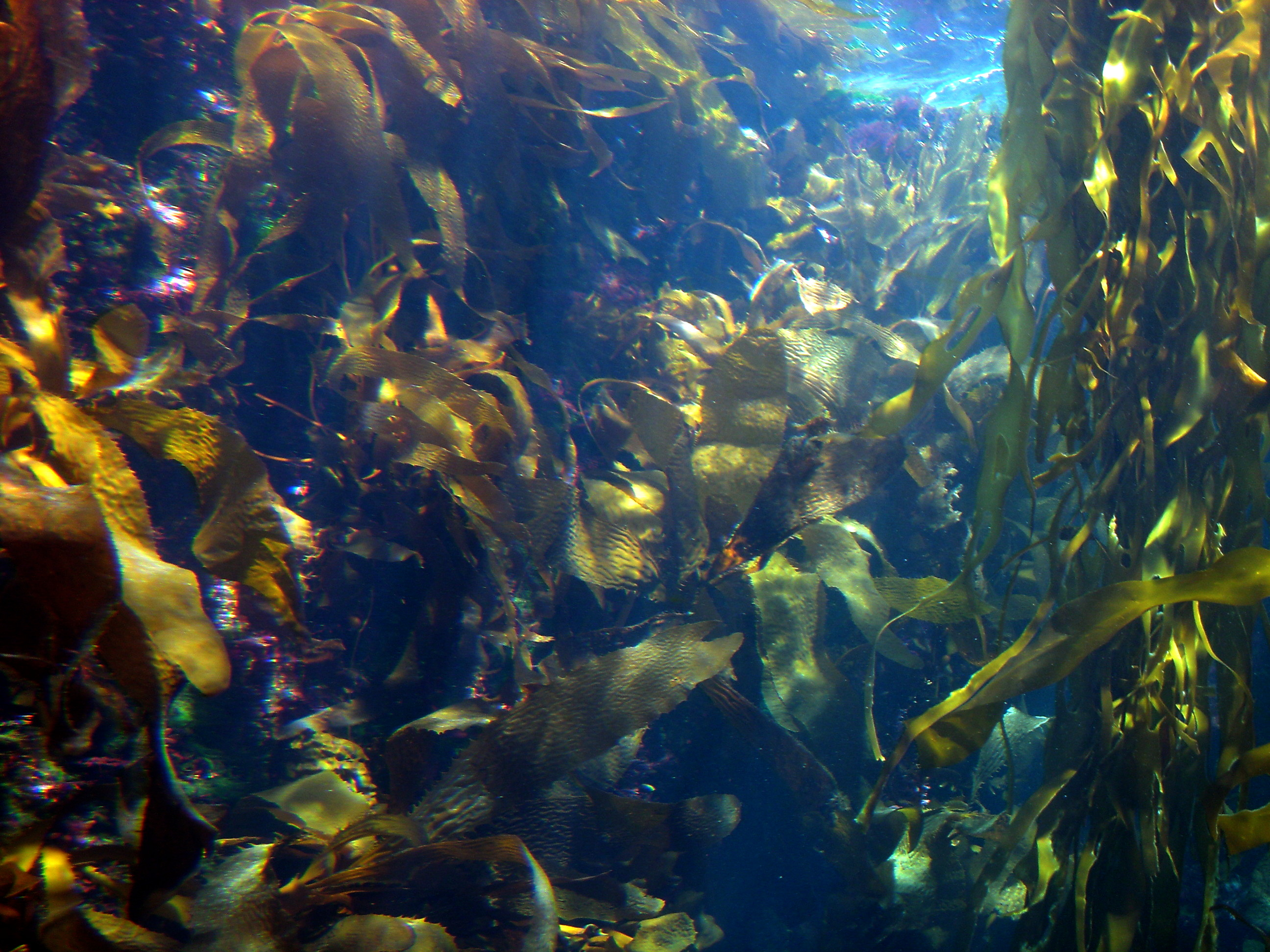
A kelp forest

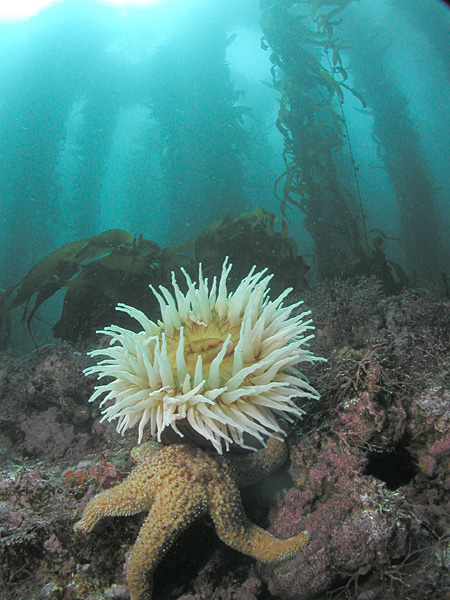
Anemone and seastar in kelp forest

== Ecology ==
=== Kelp forests ===
Kelp may develop dense forests with high production, biodiversity and ecological function. Along the Norwegian coast these forests cover 5,800 km^{2}, and they support large numbers of animals. Numerous sessile animals (sponges, bryozoans and ascidians) are found on kelp stipes and mobile invertebrate fauna are found in high densities on epiphytic algae on the kelp stipes and on kelp holdfasts. More than 100,000 mobile invertebrates per square meter are found on kelp stipes and holdfasts in well-developed kelp forests. While larger invertebrates and in particular sea urchins (Strongylocentrotus droebachiensis) are important secondary consumers controlling large barren ground areas on the Norwegian coast, they are scarce inside dense kelp forests.

=== Interactions ===
Some animals are named after the kelp, either because they inhabit the same habitat as kelp or because they feed on kelp. These include:

- Northern kelp crab (Pugettia producta) and graceful kelp crab (Pugettia gracilis), Pacific coast of North America.
- Kelp crab (Pilumnoides rubus), South Africa.
- Kelpfish (blenny) (e.g., Heterosticbus rostratus, genus Gibbonsia), Pacific coast of North America.
- Kelp goose (kelp hen) (Chloephaga hybrida), South America and the Falkland Islands
- Kelp pigeon (sheathbill) (Chionis alba and Chionis minor), Antarctic
- Reticulate kelp louse Paridotea reticulata Barnard 1914, South Africa.

== Conservation ==
Overfishing nearshore ecosystems leads to the degradation of kelp forests. Herbivores are released from their usual population regulation, leading to over-grazing of kelp and other algae. This can quickly result in barren landscapes where only a small number of species can thrive. Other major factors which threaten kelp include marine pollution and the quality of water, climate changes and certain invasive species.

Kelp forests are some of the most productive ecosystems in the world - they are home to a great diversity of species. Many groups, like those at the Seattle Aquarium, are studying the health, habitat, and population trends in order to understand why certain kelp (like bull kelp) thrives in some areas and not others. Remotely Operated Vehicles are used in the surveying of sites and the data extracted is used to learn about which conditions are best suited for kelp restoration.

== Uses ==
Seaweed, kelp, raw
Nutritional value per 100 g (3.5 oz)
- Energy: 180 kJ (43 kcal)
- Carbohydrates: 9.57 g
- Sugars: 0.6
- Dietary fiber: 1.3 g
- Fat: 0.56 g
- Protein: 1.68 g
Vitamins and minerals
Vitamins	Quantity %DV^{†}
Thiamine (B1)	4% 0.05 mg
Riboflavin (B2)	12% 0.15 mg
Niacin (B3)	3% 0.47 mg
Pantothenic acid (B5)	13% 0.642 mg
Folate (B9)	45% 180 μg
Vitamin C	3% 3 mg
Vitamin E	6% 0.87 mg
Vitamin K	55% 66 μg
Minerals	Quantity %DV^{†}
Calcium	13% 168 mg
Iron	16% 2.85 mg
Magnesium	29% 121 mg
Manganese	9% 0.2 mg
Phosphorus	3% 42 mg
Potassium	3% 89 mg
Sodium	10% 233 mg
Zinc	11% 1.23 mg
- Link to USDA Database entry
- ^{†}Percentages estimated using US recommendations for adults, except for potassium, which is estimated based on expert recommendation from the National Academies.

Giant kelp can be harvested fairly easily because of its surface canopy and growth habit of staying in deeper water.

Kelp ash is rich in iodine and alkali. In great amount, kelp ash can be used in soap and glass production. Until the Leblanc process was commercialized in the early 19th century, burning of kelp in Scotland was one of the principal industrial sources of soda ash (predominantly sodium carbonate). Around 23 tons of seaweed was required to produce 1 ton of kelp ash. The kelp ash would consist of around 5% sodium carbonate.

Once the Leblanc Process became commercially viable in Britain during the 1820s, common salt replaced kelp ash as raw material for sodium carbonate. Though the price of kelp ash went into steep decline, seaweed remained the only commercial source of iodine. To supply the new industry in iodine synthesis, kelp ash production continued in some parts of West and North Scotland, North West Ireland and Guernsey. The species Saccharina latissima yielded the greatest amount of iodine (between 10 and 15 lbs per ton) and was most abundant in Guernsey. Iodine was extracted from kelp ash using a lixiviation process. As with sodium carbonate however, mineral sources eventually supplanted seaweed in iodine production.

Alginate, a kelp-derived carbohydrate, is used to thicken products such as ice cream, jelly, salad dressing, and toothpaste, as well as an ingredient in exotic dog food and in manufactured goods. Alginate powder is also used frequently in general dentistry and orthodontics for making impressions of the upper and lower arches. Kelp polysaccharides are used in skin care as gelling ingredients and because of claimed, but unproven, benefits provided by fucoidan.

Kombu (昆布 in Japanese, and 海带 in Chinese, Saccharina japonica and others), several Pacific species of kelp, is a very important ingredient in Chinese, Japanese, and Korean cuisines. Kombu is used to flavor broths and stews (especially dashi), as a savory garnish (tororo konbu) for rice and other dishes, as a vegetable, and a primary ingredient in popular snacks (such as tsukudani). Transparent sheets of kelp (oboro konbu) are used as an edible decorative wrapping for rice and other foods.

Kombu can be used to soften beans during cooking, and to help convert indigestible sugars and thus reduce flatulence.

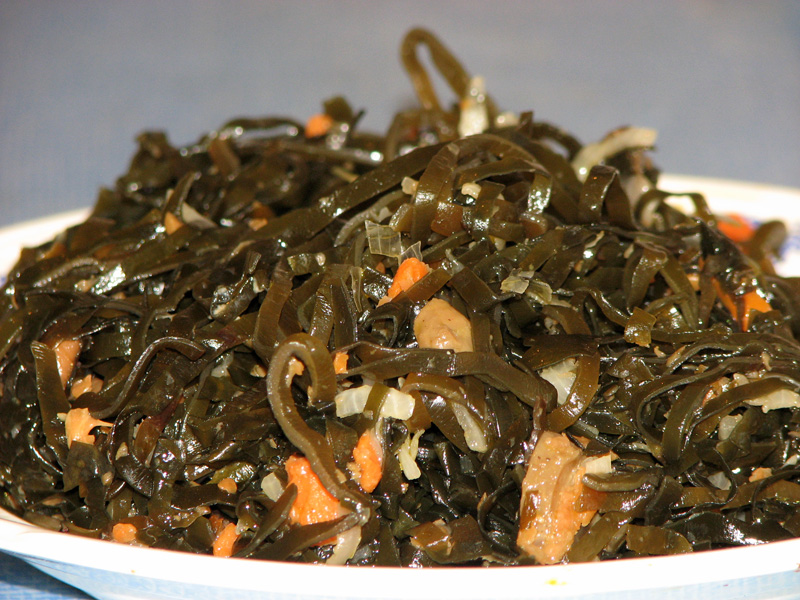
Saccharina latissima in canned salad form

In Russia (especially in the Russian Far East and the White Sea region) and other former Soviet Union countries, several types of kelp are of commercial importance: Saccharina latissima, Laminaria digitata, and Saccharina japonica. Known locally as 'Sea Cabbage' (Russian: морская капуста, tr. morskaya kapusta), they are available in retail trade in dried, frozen, or canned forms. They are used as an ingredient in various salads and soups, as a filling for pastries, and even as an additive in confectionery, such as chocolate with sea salt and kelp particles.

Because of its high concentration of iodine, brown kelp (Laminaria) has been used to treat goiter, an enlargement of the thyroid gland caused by a lack of iodine, since medieval times. An intake of roughly 150 micrograms of iodine per day is beneficial for preventing hypothyroidism. Overconsumption can lead to kelp-induced thyrotoxicosis.

In 2010, researchers found that alginate, the soluble fibre substance in sea kelp, was better at preventing fat absorption than most over-the-counter slimming treatments in laboratory trials. As a food additive, it may be used to reduce fat absorption and thus obesity. Kelp in its natural form has not yet been demonstrated to have such effects.

Kelp's rich iron content can help prevent iron deficiency.

=== Commercial production ===
Commercial production of kelp harvested from its natural habitat has taken place in Japan for over a century. Many countries today produce and consume laminaria products; the largest producer is China. Laminaria japonica, the important commercial seaweed, was first introduced into China in the late 1920s from Hokkaido, Japan. Yet mariculture of this alga on a very large commercial scale was realized in China only in the 1950s. Between the 1950s and the 1980s, kelp production in China increased from about 60 to over 250,000 dry weight metric tons annually.

== In culture ==
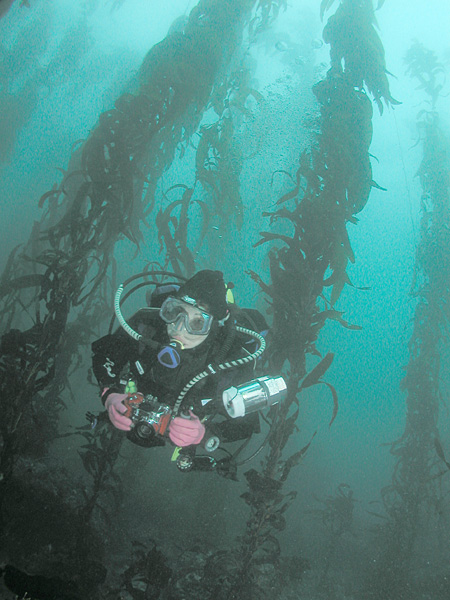
Scuba diver in kelp forest

Some of the earliest evidence for human use of marine resources, coming from Middle Stone Age sites in South Africa, includes the harvesting of foods such as abalone, limpets, and mussels associated with kelp forest habitats.

In 2007, Erlandson et al. suggested that kelp forests around the Pacific Rim may have facilitated the dispersal of anatomically modern humans following a coastal route from Northeast Asia to the Americas. This "kelp highway hypothesis" suggested that highly productive kelp forests supported rich and diverse marine food webs in nearshore waters, including many types of fish, shellfish, birds, marine mammals, and seaweeds that were similar from Japan to California, Erlandson and his colleagues also argued that coastal kelp forests reduced wave energy and provided a linear dispersal corridor entirely at sea level, with few obstacles to maritime peoples. Archaeological evidence from California's Channel Islands confirms that islanders were harvesting kelp forest shellfish and fish, beginning as much as 12,000 years ago.

During the Highland Clearances, many Scottish Highlanders were moved on to areas of estates known as crofts, and went to industries such as fishing and kelping (producing soda ash from the ashes of kelp). At least until the 1840s, when there were steep falls in the price of kelp, landlords wanted to create pools of cheap or virtually free labour, supplied by families subsisting in new crofting townships. Kelp collection and processing was a very profitable way of using this labour, and landlords petitioned successfully for legislation designed to stop emigration. The profitability of kelp harvesting meant that landlords began to subdivide their land for small tenant kelpers, who could now afford higher rent than their gentleman farmer counterparts. But the economic collapse of the kelp industry in northern Scotland during the 1820s led to further emigration, especially to North America.

Natives of the Falkland Islands are sometimes nicknamed "Kelpers". This designation is primarily applied by outsiders rather than the natives themselves.

In Chinese slang, "kelp" (simplified Chinese: 海带; traditional Chinese: 海帶; pinyin: hǎi dài), is used to describe an unemployed returnee. It has negative overtones, implying the person is drifting aimlessly, and is also a homophonic expression (Chinese: 海待; pinyin: hǎidài, literally "sea waiting"). This expression is contrasted with the employed returnee, having a dynamic ability to travel across the ocean: the "sea turtle" (simplified Chinese: 海龟; traditional Chinese: 海龜; pinyin: hǎi gūi) and is also homophonic with another word (simplified Chinese: 海归; traditional Chinese: 海歸; pinyin: hǎi gūi, literally "sea return").

== Gallery ==
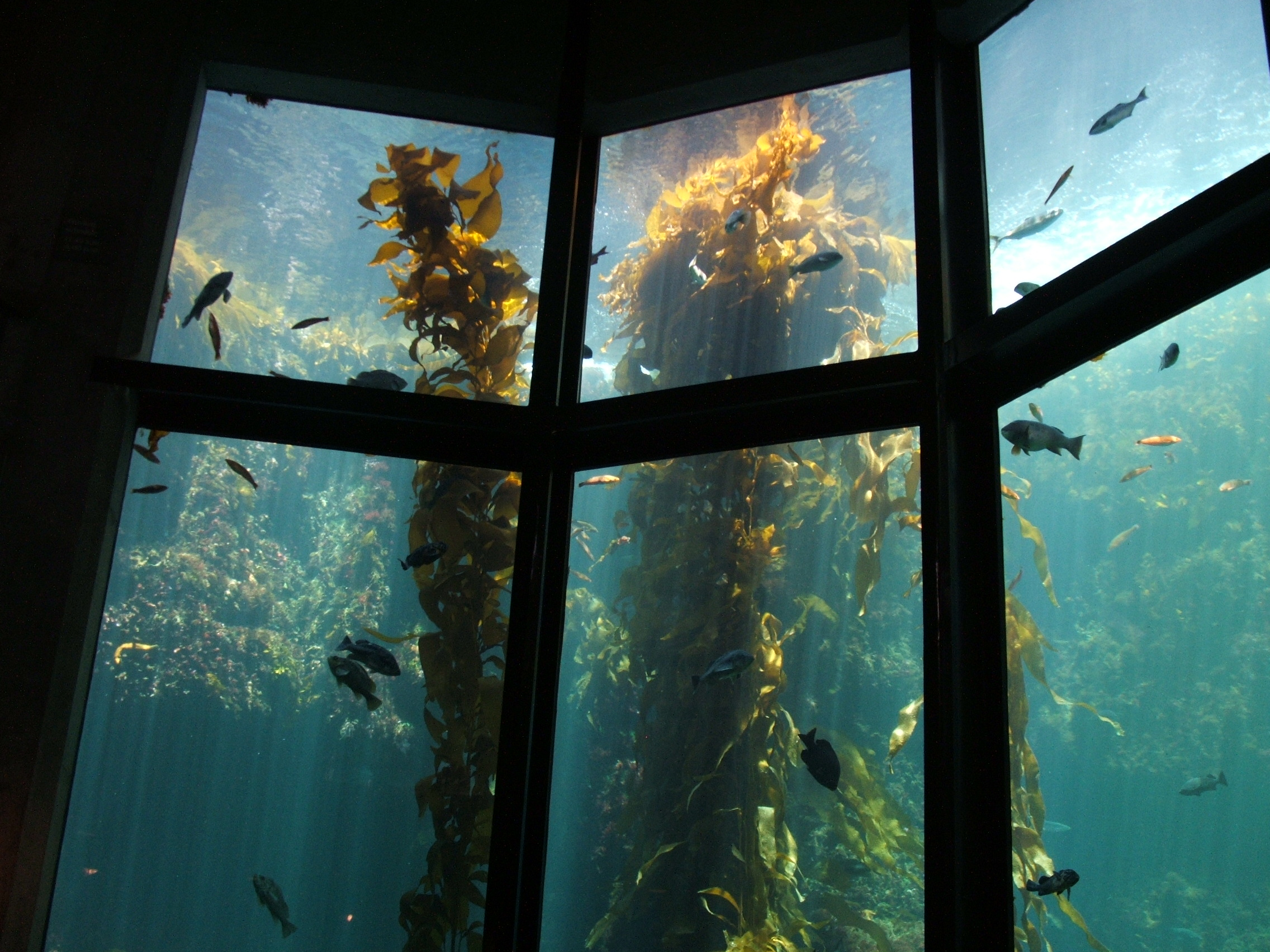
Giant kelp in Monterey Bay Aquarium's Kelp Forest exhibit

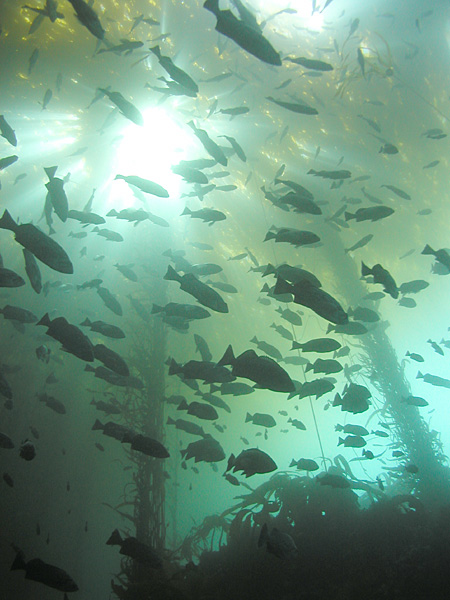
Blue rockfish in kelp forest

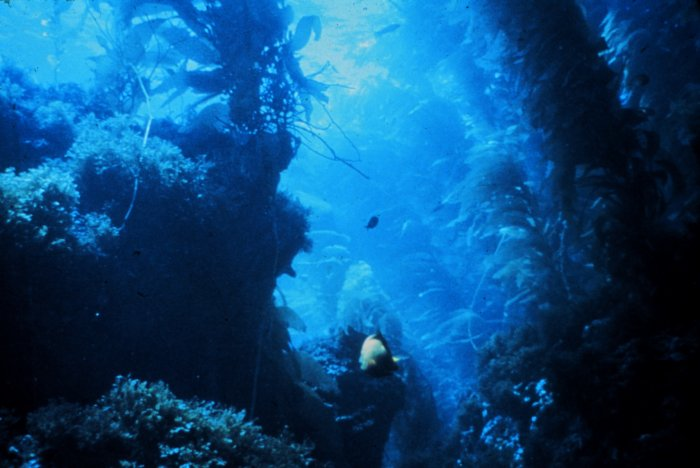
An underwater shot of a kelp forest

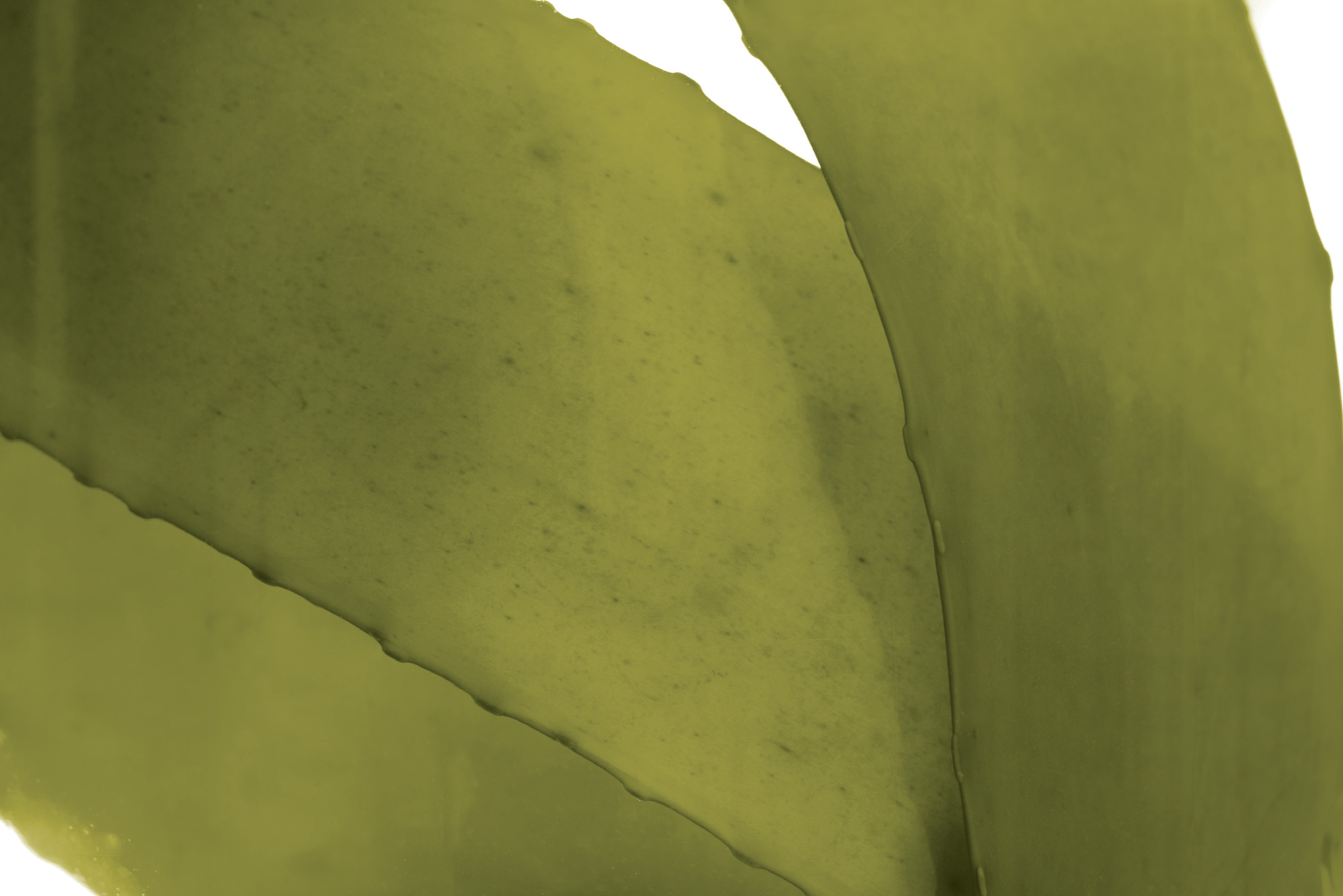
A close up view of Ecklonia maxima, giant brown kelp

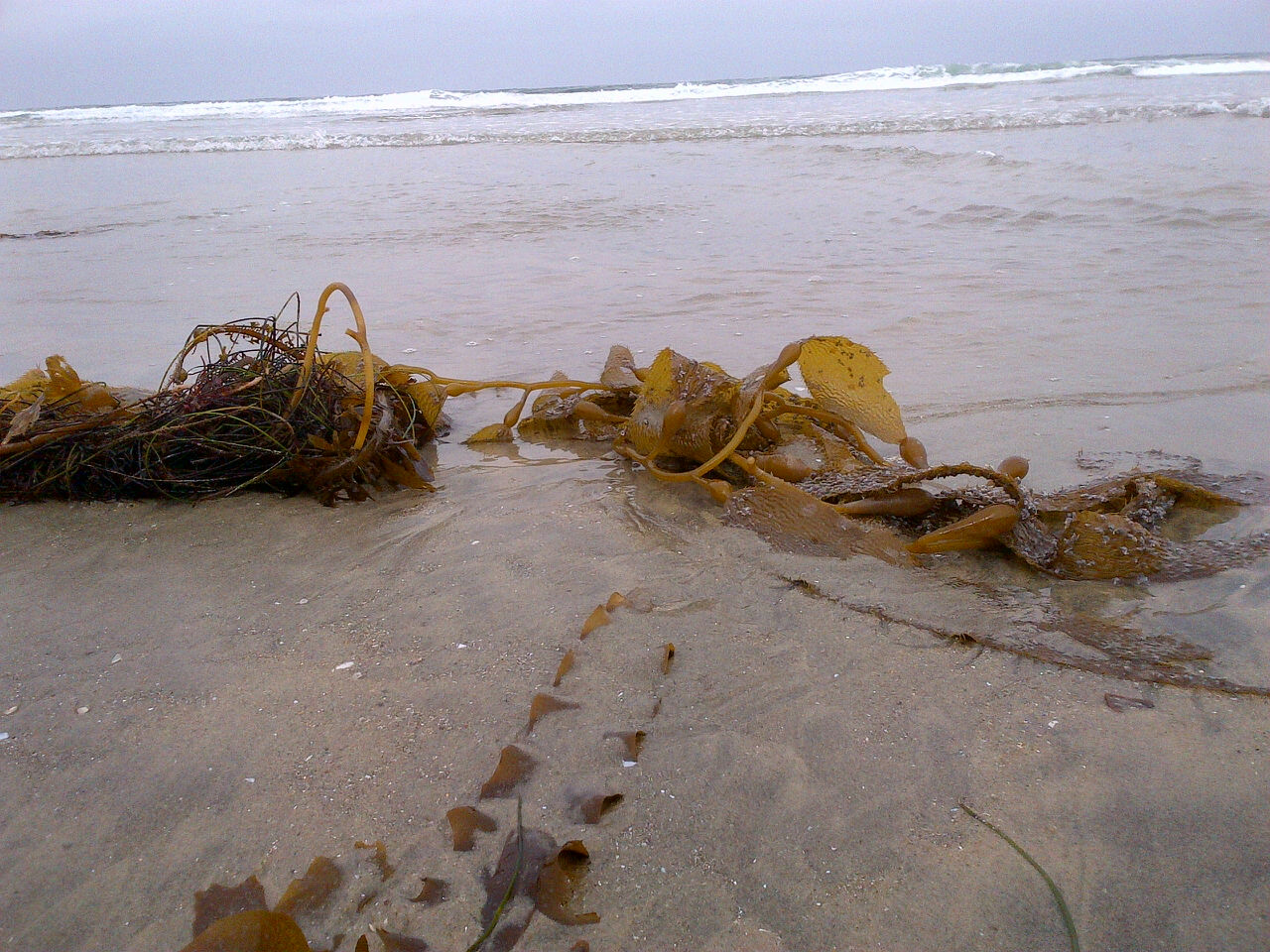
Washed-up kelp found along the coast of La Jolla Shores

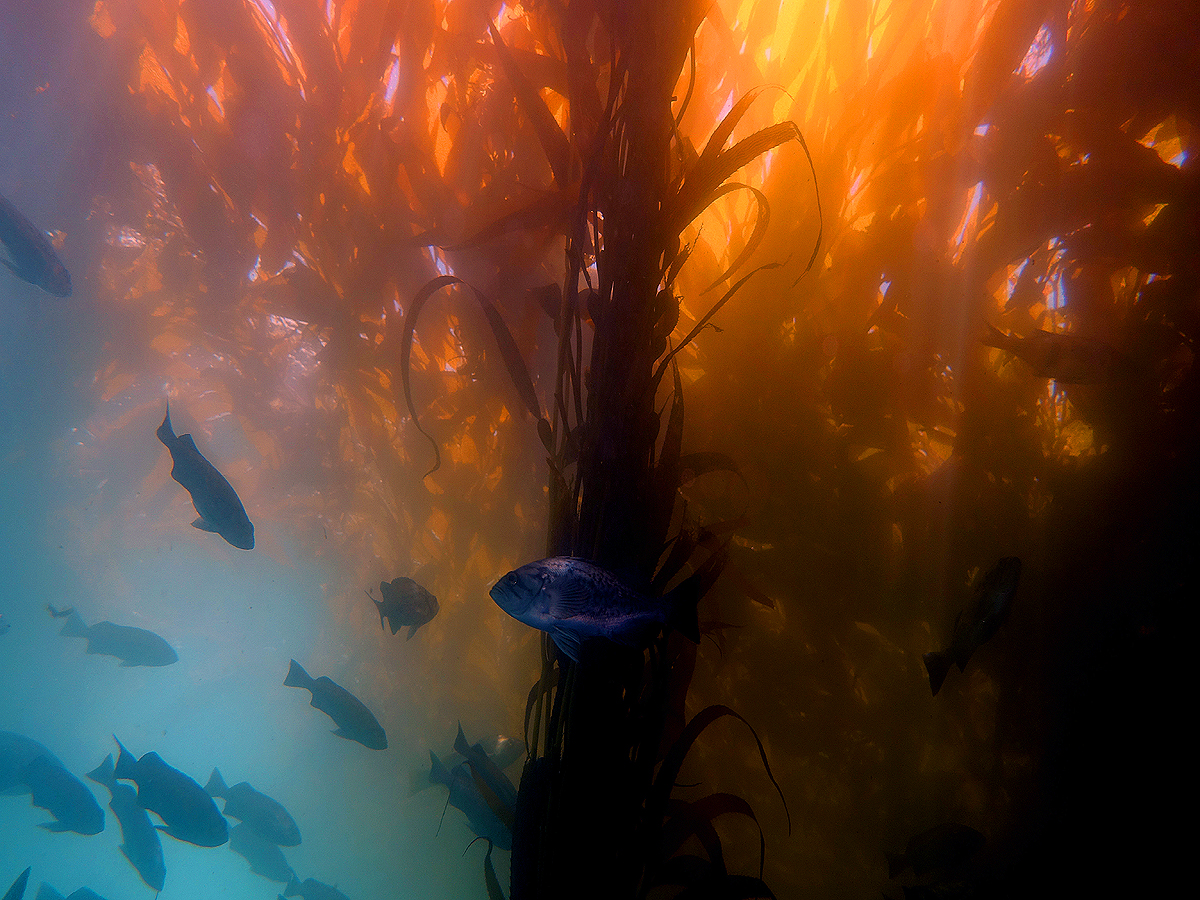
Scuba diving in a kelp forest in California

== See also ==
- Bladder wrack – Species of seaweed
- Blue carbon – Carbon stored in coastal and marine ecosystems
- Durvillaea, also known as southern bull kelps – Genus of seaweeds
- Beach wrack – Organic material deposited at high tide on beaches and other coastal areas
- Sea lettuce – Genus of seaweeds
- Aquaculture of giant kelp – Cultivation of seaweed
