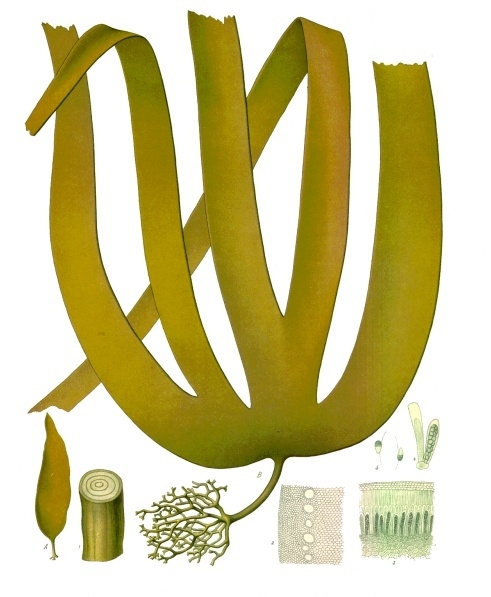
- Laminaria hyperborea

Scientific classification
- Domain: Eukaryota
- Clade: Sar
- Clade: Stramenopiles
- Division: Ochrophyta
- Class: Phaeophyceae
- Order: Laminariales
- Family: Laminariaceae; Bory

Genera
- See text

= Laminariaceae =

Family of brown algal seaweeds, many genera of which are popularly called "kelp"

Laminariaceae is a family of brown algal seaweeds, many genera of which are popularly called "kelp". The table indicates the genera within this family. The family includes the largest known seaweeds: Nereocystis and Macrocystis.

Laminariaceae genera
Genus	Authority	Species
Arthrothamnus	Ruprecht	2
Cymathere	J. Agardh	2
Kjellmaniella	Miyabe	1
Laminaria	J.V. Lamouroux	29
Macrocystis	C. Agardh	1
Nereocystis	Postels & Ruprecht	1
Pelagophycus	Areschoug	1
Postelsia	Ruprecht	1
Pseudolessonia	G.Y. Cho, N.G. Klochkova, T.N. Krupnova & Boo	1
Saccharina	Stackhouse	24
Streptophyllopsis	Kajimura	1
