= Holdfast (biology) =

Root-like structure that anchors aquatic sessile organisms, such as seaweed

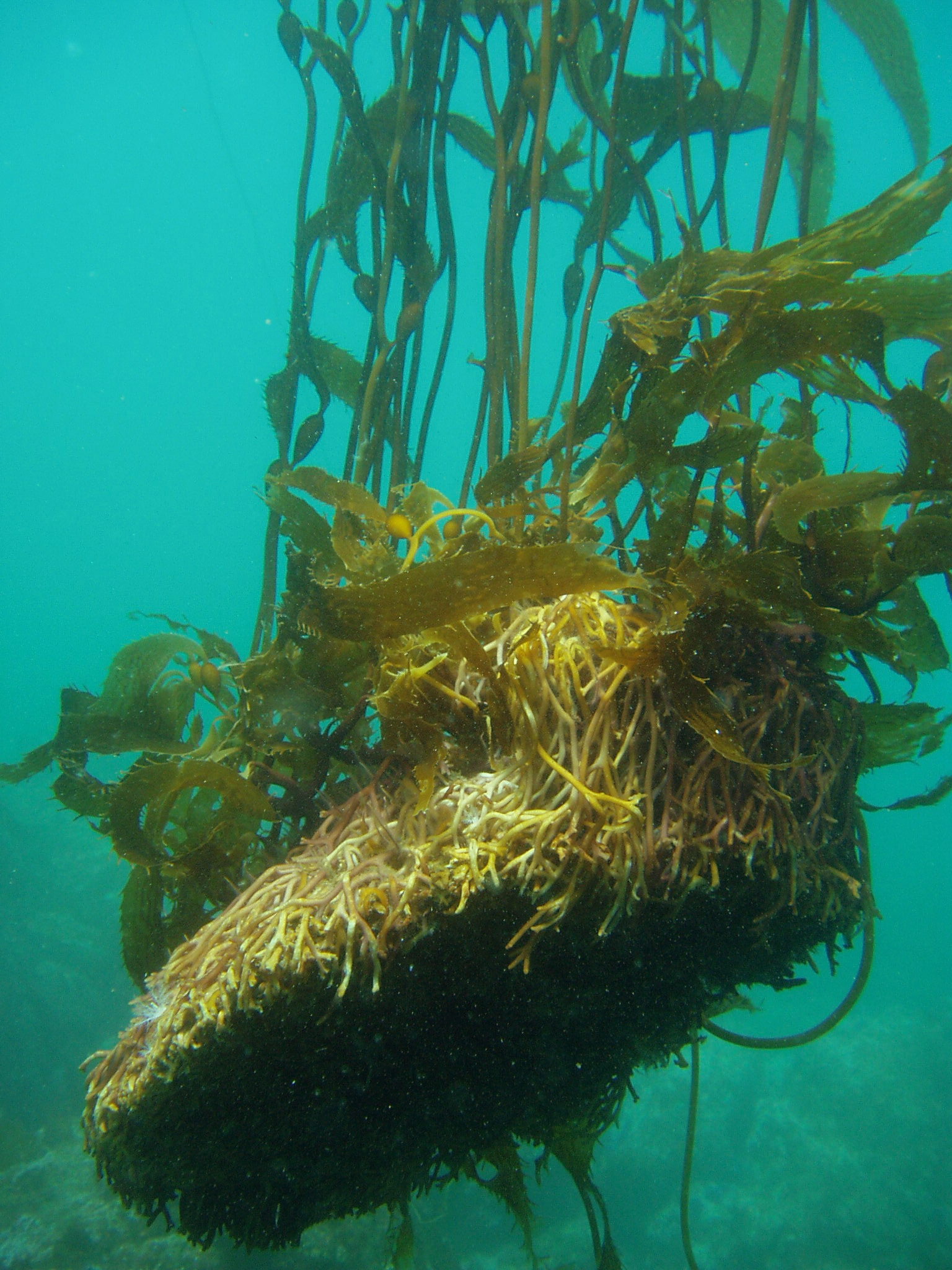
Holdfast torn from the sea floor by a storm

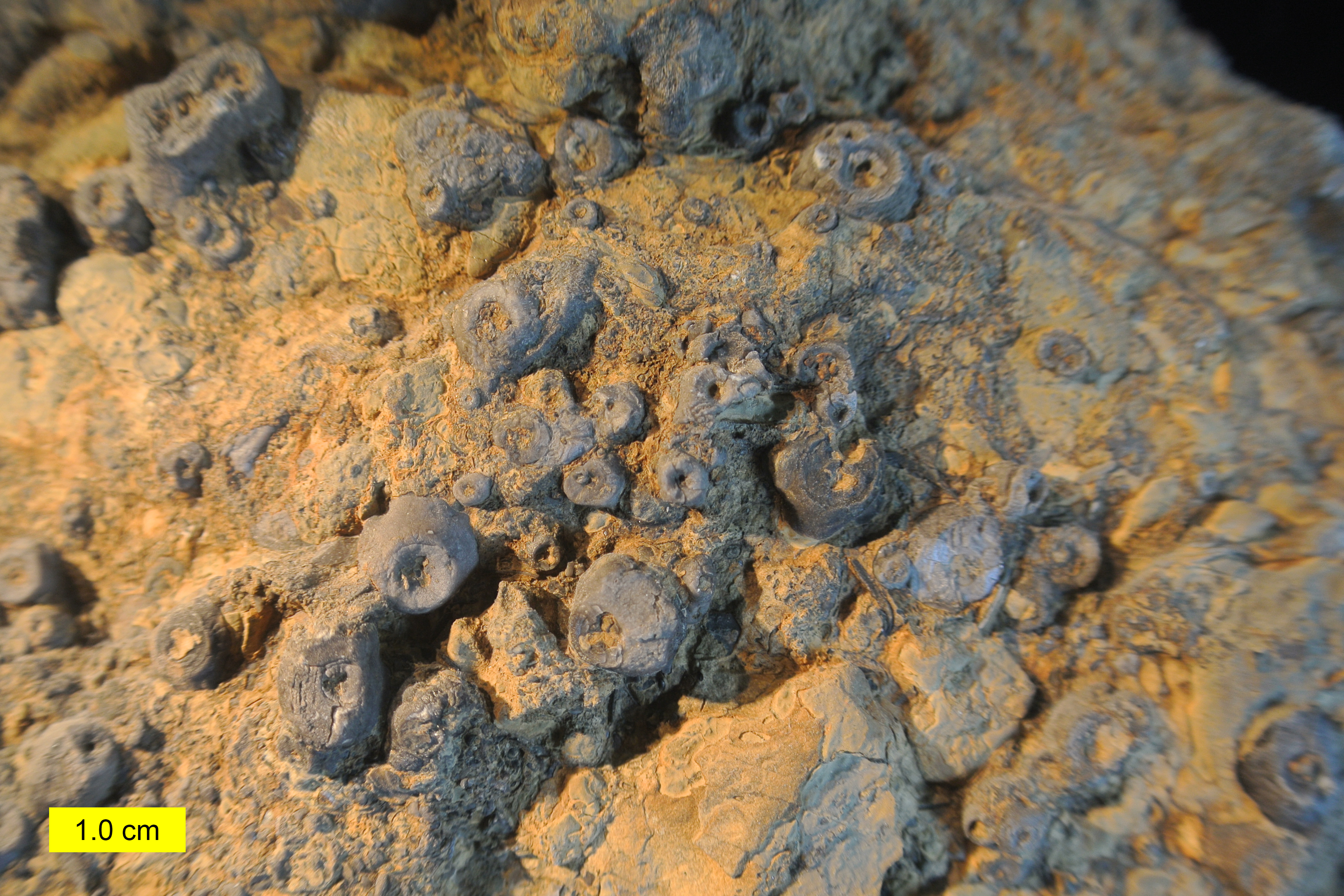
Eocrinoid holdfasts on an Ordovician hardground in Utah

A holdfast is a root-like structure that anchors aquatic sessile organisms, such as seaweed, other sessile algae, stalked crinoids, benthic cnidarians, and sponges, to the substrate.

Holdfasts vary in shape and form depending on both the species and the substrate type. The holdfasts of organisms that live in muddy substrates often have complex tangles of root-like growths. These projections are called haptera and similar structures of the same name are found on lichens. The holdfasts of organisms that live in sandy substrates are bulb-like and very flexible, such as those of sea pens, thus permitting the organism to pull the entire body into the substrate when the holdfast is contracted. The holdfasts of organisms that live on smooth surfaces (such as the surface of a boulder) have flattened bases which adhere to the surface. The organism derives no nutrition from this intimate contact with the substrate, as the process of liberating nutrients from the substrate requires enzymatically eroding the substrate away, thereby increasing the risk of the organism falling off the substrate.

The claw-like holdfasts of kelps and other algae differ from the roots of land plants, in that they have no absorbent function, instead serving only as an anchor.
