= Kazunoko =

Herring roe

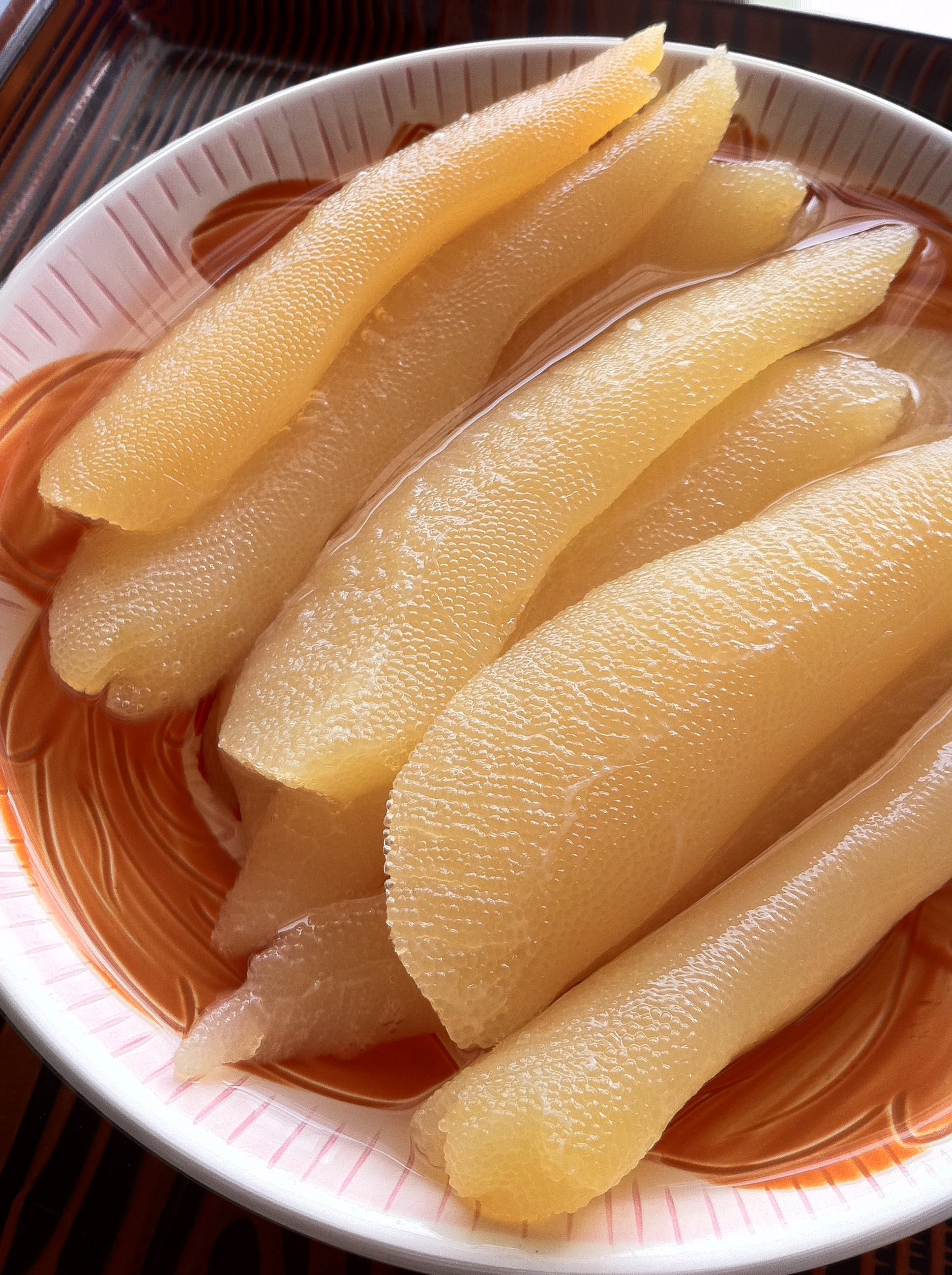
Dish of kazunoko prepared ready to serve.

Kazunoko (数の子), in Japanese cuisine, (Note: Although one source gives the Korean equivalent in hangul only, the term Korean: 청어속; Hanja: 靑魚屬; RR: cheonggeosok; lit. ''blue fish genus'' refers to Clupea genus of herring, not specifically the roe.) are the eggs or the ovaries (egg skeins) of the Pacific herring (Japanese: kazunoko nishin) that have been salted or dried.

== Overview ==
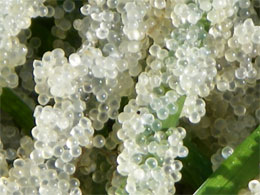
komochi kombu or herring "spawn on kelp".

Kazunoko is a product processed by removing the roe sacs (or "egg skeins") from female herrings intact in its shape, then preserving by sun-drying (hoshi kazunoko) or by salting or brining (shio kazunoko). The eggs are individually tiny, but together they form oblong clusters measuring approximately 8 centimetres (3.1 in) long and 3 centimetres (1.2 in) wide.

The kazunoko, symbolizing fertility, has been a staple of the osechi assortment of food for the New Year. From around 1955, domestic herring catches fell sharply for Japan (mostly only caught around Hokkaido in the north), and nearly all supplies now depend on imports, mostly from the Pacific coasts of Canada and Alaska but also including the use of Atlantic herring. A technique for bleaching into uniform gold color was established, and the lucrative commodity earned the nickname of "yellow dia[mond]".

A subtype is the komochi kombu (子持ち昆布) or "spawn on kelp", which are Pacific herring eggs laid on various seaweed regarded as "kelp", now harvested mostly in British Columbia, Canada.

Historically, the oldest records of kazunoko in Japan date back to the 15th and 16th centuries, and they were served, for example to Toyotomi Hideyoshi, during the spring season (Cf. § history below). The harvest of kazunoko from herring occurs in the spring, but the dried product was being sold as a New Year's season item by the end of the 17th century. (Note: Attested in the Honchō shokkan published 1697, cf. below.) The history of its production overlaps with the history of producing dried migaki nishin for food, which came into full force around Kyōho (1716–36) with the availability of salt up north, and later the production of kasu or fishmeal from early 19th century (Note: Howell writes that "herring-meal fertilizer nishin shimekasu was known for a long while in the Tohoku region, "but did not become a major commodity until cultivators of cotton [etc.] in Ōmi [Province] began using it in the Kyōho era (1716–1736). Godefroy places shimekasu (prematurely) in the 1730s. Mizuhara concludes herring shimekasu etc. began to be sold around Tenmei era (1780s) to merchants of Tsuruga and Obama (Echizen Province) and Osaka.) onwards.

The traditional harvesting of spores on kelp by natives, including the use of hemlock branches for the purpose, is surveyed (Cf. § First Nations food source).

There are various socio-economic issues which concerns Pacific herring fishing overall, with regards to native fishing grounds being overtaken by modern mass commercialized production, But aspects particular to herring roe have been taken up below, e.g., the "kazukono ledger" to record the debts to be worked off by Ainu women. Also, North American herring fishing since the 1960s have has principally been aimed at harvesting the kazunoko for the Japanese market, waste/sustainability issues have been raised (cf. also Pacific herring § Roe fishery).

== Etymology ==
Both "kazunoko" and the archaic kadonoko occur in medieval or post-medieval writings and also written in Sinitic forms such as 鯟子, 鰊子, 鯡子, 鯑. or 䱧.

There are two or three etymological hypotheses that have been presented.

The derivation of kazunoko as the corrupted form of kado no ko, where kado is the old name for herring, is the generally accepted etymology according to some sources. This explanation is already attested in the Honchō shokkan published 1697. (Note: "誤って數子を以って鯟子と爲す") The entry under 鯟 kado in the Honchō shokkan clarifies the pronunciation of the character by the supply the phonetic reading as kato/kado (加登). It goes on to state that kazunoko (數子) has been phonetically written as ka-to-no-ko (加登乃古/加豆乃古). (Note: Here to instead of do. The dakuon or voiced sound shift, indicated by dakuten (゛) symbol is routinely eschewed in archaic texts.) Even beyond the Edo Period, kado or kado iwashi still survives in dialect as local name for herring, even though nishin is the standard Japanese term.

The alternate etymological theory holds that kazunoko may well have derived from the literal verbatim meaning of 'child of numbers/numerousness', as had been suggested by Ōishi Chibiki's Gengentei (言元梯) (1830/1834), and in fact, early usage writes the word as kazunoko (cf. § History below).

A third theory is discernible in the Edo Period essay Kiyū shōran (1830), (Note: Note that this essay Kiyū shōran writes the kado fish as 靑魚(カド), which can be construed as the class of 'blue fish' (discussed under § Nutritional value) rather than herring.) which mentions that kazunoko was known by the alias kazukazu (かずかず) in contemporary women's language (onna kotoba), juxtaposed with the information that Muromachi period literature wrote of kozukozu (cod organ (Note: Probably the soft roe (milt) of cod, still often used in Japanese cuisine.)) as a New Year's dish. The connection between these two (similarly sounding) terms as synonymous (cognates?) are made in the Daigenkai dictionary.

There is speculation that Japanese kado must have derived from some Ainu word, (Note: Dr. Ōtsuki who edited the Daigenkai dictionary proposed this, according to Umegaki.) but the known Ainu word for "herring" is heroki, (with variant spellings), and linguist Minoru Umegaki rejects this hypothesis.

== Japanese cuisine ==
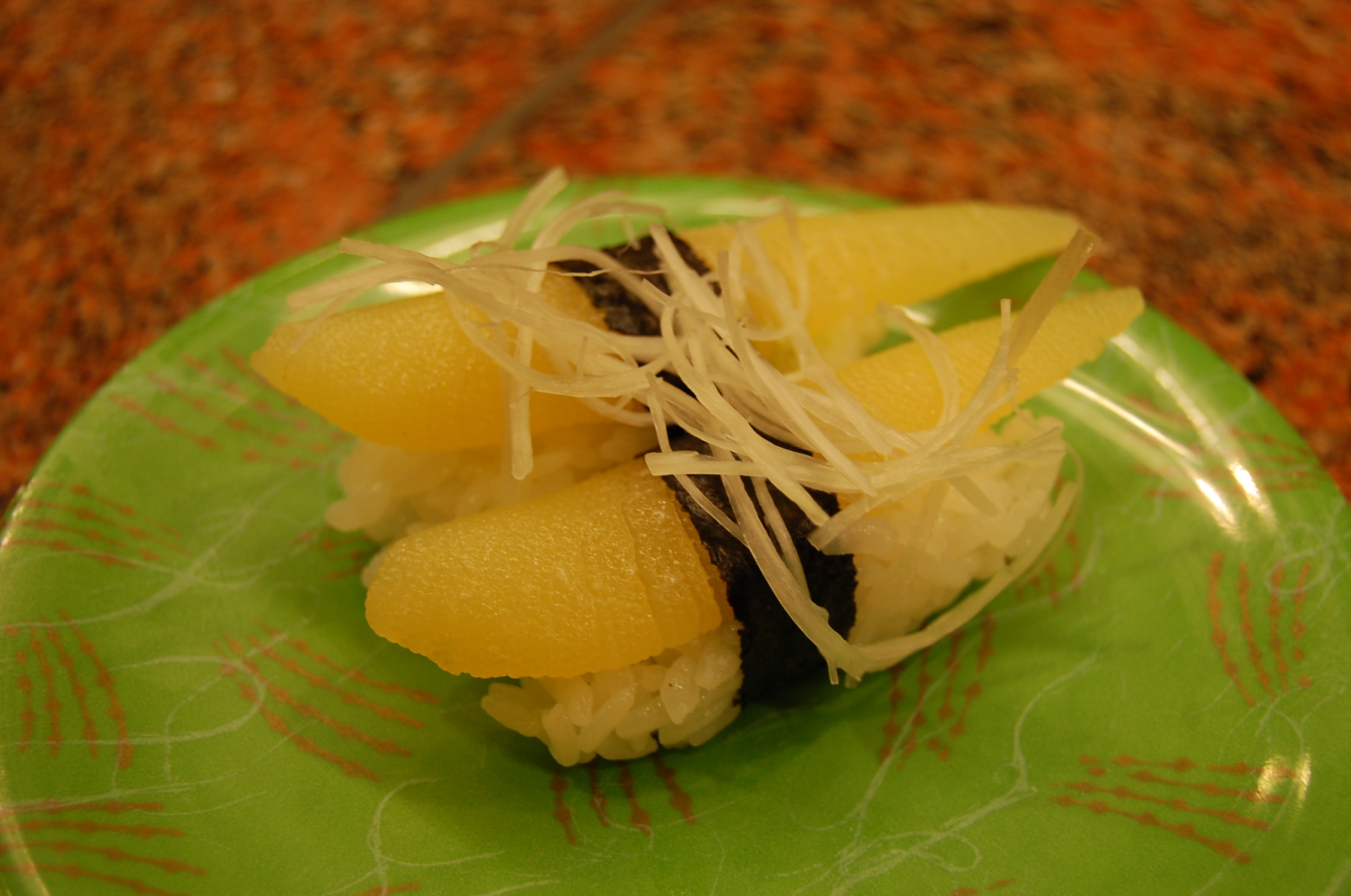
Kazunoko on sushi

Kazunoko marketed in Japan fall into these groups: hoshi kazunoko (干し数の子; 'dried herring roe'), shio kazunoko (塩数の子; lit. 'salt herring roe') and ajitsuke kazunoko (味付け数の子; lit. 'flavored herring roe'). (Note: The ajitsuke type may be soy sauce, wasabi, or chili-pepper flavored, etc.)

Only limited supplies of the dried are now manufactured. (Note: On the question of whether dried kazunoko is now a higher quality item than salted, it has certainly become a pricey luxury item in short supply, commanding prices in the 40,000 yen per kilo range by the 2000s. Note that a brand developed under the name Marehibiki (稀響) fetched a record price of 100,000 per kilo, and this was reported by press as salted kazunoko, but the product, developed by Ihara Suisan, is actually sun-dried prime herring roe.) The flavored type using Atlantic roe have been characterized as "secondary market", or even "substitute" products by American sources (but see further discussion below).

Kazunoko a standard part of New Year's fare called osechi, and are soy-sauce marinaded to keep for days (or made into kasuzuke). (Note: The Honchō shokkan (1697) attests that already by the late 17th century the kazunoko was an item commodity that appeared in the market around the lunar 12th month and 1st month. The source describes the dried kazunoko as resembling sōkyō/saikachi (皂莢; Japanese locust seedpods), and states that by this period (Genroku era), kazunoko was eaten pickled in soy sauce, irizake (umeboshi reduced in sake), or sakekasu. (Note: Pickling (tsuke[ru]) in sakekasu makes it a kasuzuke dish.))

Kitaōji Rosanjin, eminent gourmet connoisseur and restaurateur, commented in his time that although raw or salted kazunoko was becoming available, dried kazunoko reconstituted with water was the best, taste-wise (essay, loosely translated "Kazunoko is about eating the sound", 1930). (Note: That is, the crunchy sounding texture is important.) While it is typically served topped with bonito flakes and splashed with soy sauce, Rosanjin insists on not letting the sauce seep in too much; his rule also opposes introducing other flavors such as miso or sakekasu, or pickling/marinating in soy sauce. However, there is also the opposite opinion, that the dried kazunoko is "more delicious after letting the soy sauce soak in well"". (Note: Co-author Tekishū Motoyama。) (Note: Dried type must be reconstituted in water, sometime for a number of days. Pre-soaking in rice-wash water (togi jiru) is an old cooking tip for removing harsh tasted, and also applied to salted (as of Motoyama 1965), but soaking in plain water suffices for now available salted products, for two days, but not to desalinate too much.)

Matsumaezuke is a soy-pickled dish that typically contains chunks of kazunoko in the mix of julienned dried squid (surume) and kombu seaweed. (Note: Here too, some express opinion that extraneous seasoning should not be used.) The addition of kazunoko allegedly only dates back to 1929, as an arrangement on what was originally a squid and kelp recipe. (Note: According to a government (Ministry of Trade and Industry) research group.)

The kazunoko is known for its texture or mouthfeel (crunchiness), the sound of biting into it described onomatopoeically as puchi puchi (cf. § Quality assessment by region) The Atlantic herring is deemed overall to have less crunchiness, so that they are largely consigned to becoming "flavored kazunoko" or a side dish (sōzai, equivalent to okazu). But Atlantic herring of some regions are made into the normal salted/brined variety (Cf. § Quality assessment by region).

The "komochi kombu" (aka kazunoko kombu) or "spawn on kelp" may be eaten on its own as a delicacy, or sliced up and used for sushi. and can command very high prices.

=== Quality assessment by region ===
Of the diminished Japanese herring catch in Hokkaido, only a minuscule fraction now gets used for exploiting the eggs. According to one comparative study, the Canada Pacific herring roe taken in British Columbia, or Alaskan roe harvested in Sitka or Kah Shakes Cove (Note: aka Kah Shakes Lagoon, at the southern tip of the state, in Ketchikan Gateway Borough, Alaska.) produce quality eggs, suited for salted (or even dried).

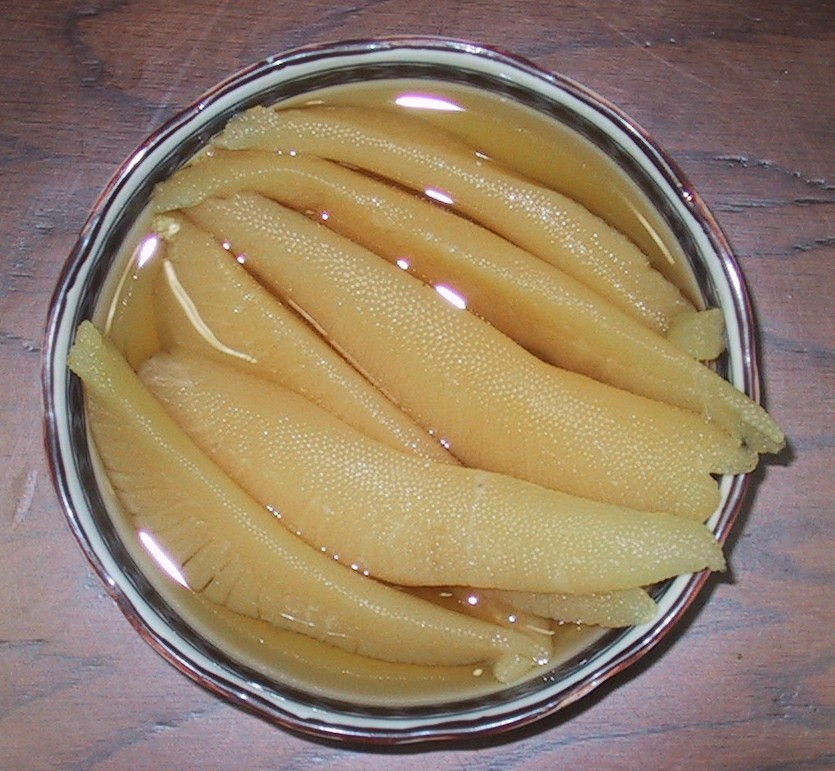
Raw kazunoko

Atlantic herring roe according to some sources are considered to be limper. (Note: Alaskan source claims "smaller and softer", while the Japanese says "size is bigger but lacks crunchiness".) But they are not always being downgraded as "flavored kazunoko" quality, and some are considered fit for making into regular salted/brined kazunoko, particularly roes from Baltic and North Sea area fish. Thus the Baltic group (subspecies C. harengus menbrus) has been rated best among Atlantic species (Note: Sasaki's Table 7 describes Baltic as quality midway between Pacific and Atlantic.) fit to be made into salted (shio kazunoko), as are the roes originating in Scotland (Shetlands), Ireland, and Netherlands have been Other than texture, viscosity (ability to bind together into a lump) is another criterion for quality, and eggs that fall apart easily is a disqualifying factor for manufacturing whole salted kazunoko. (Note: The Canadian Atlantic coast caught herrings are assessed by Sasaki's study as low viscosity and brittle/crumbly, making them unfit for salted.)

The Atlantic herring, with the crunchiness (hagotae) somewhat wanting. And one study does concur the Atlantic types do not solidify as firmly, and are mostly processed as flavored kazunoko, but generalizations aside, the same study assesses the Baltic Sea Baltic catches (subspecies C. harengus menbrus) to be superlative in Atlantic, (Note: Described as "midway between Pacific and [other] Atlantic" in Table 7.) and these do get used for making salted kazunoko, even though the individual egg size is smaller (half by weight) according to other studies. (Note: The data for Hokkaido shows significant variance by region, and the fertilized egg measures from about 1.3–1.4 millimters, with dry mass of about 0.13–0.30 mg. Meanwhile the "Norwegian spring-spawning herring [group].. [laid] eggs with average dry mass of 0.29–0.35 mg" while the Baltic sea egg at "0.12–0.14 mg.. was short of half [that] weight".)

=== Nutritional value ===
A basic nutritional value and energy assessment has been made in a study of Edo Period foods, including kazunoko.

While kazunoko is high in cholesterol (as are fish roe in general), it also contains a high concentration of EPA and DHA fatty acids, known to reduce cholesterol levels. (Note: The Shokuzai kenkō dictionary under "Pacific herring" writes of EPA content and blood-clot prevention in boldface, and mentions the fish having EPA and DHA content, with cholesterol lowering effects; and under "Kazunoko" states "since fish lipid prevent arteriosclerosis and blood clots, it effectively 'makes the blood [flow] all smoothy-like' or ketsueki sarasara, in colloquial parlance.". Herring roe is richer in EPA or DHA than herring flesh. (Kasuga, Ogiwara & Aoyagi (2007), p. 329, citing Suzuki (1994).)) While herring is classed as an aozakana (lit. 'blue fish') consisting of fish considered good sources of omega-3 fatty acids, herring (or 'blue fish' in general) had been blacklisted as food to avoid for gout (gouty arthritis) patients due to purine content, though recent studies and guideline (Note: Guideline for the management of hyperuricemia and gout (『高尿酸血症・痛風の治療ガイドライン』, Kōnyōsankesshō・tsūfū chiryō gaidoraine), published by the Japanese Society of Gout and Uric & Nucleic Acids. Oka cites 1st edition; Dr. Taniguchi cites the 3rd edition in the newspaper article. The paper and article each print its own excerpted table of high/low purine foods. Oka's table lists kazunoko as low.) have muted the warning against 'blue fish', unless it is the dried or semi-dried himono type. (Note: Rheumatoid specialist Dr. Taniguchi states that overeating seafoods, dried himono fish, and fish roe may be harmful, though "it has been reported that 'blue fish' containing EPA and DHA are not a problem".) (Note: Oka's table, excerpted from Guideline, lists about a dozen items as very high (300mg+ per 100g) or high (200–300mg), including semi-dried himono of maiwashi (sardine/prichard, S. s. melanostictus), maaji (jack mackerel), and sanma (saury); bonito and bonito flakes, and niboshi, which may fall into 'blue fish' category. About thirty very low (<50mg) listed, including kazunoko.) But even though fish roe are generally to be avoided by gout sufferers, kazunoko is listed as containing very low concentrations of purine (<50 mg per 100g). Similar dieteary cautions and recommendations apply to those diagnosed with hyperuricemia, which is considered a preliminary stage towards gout.

== History ==
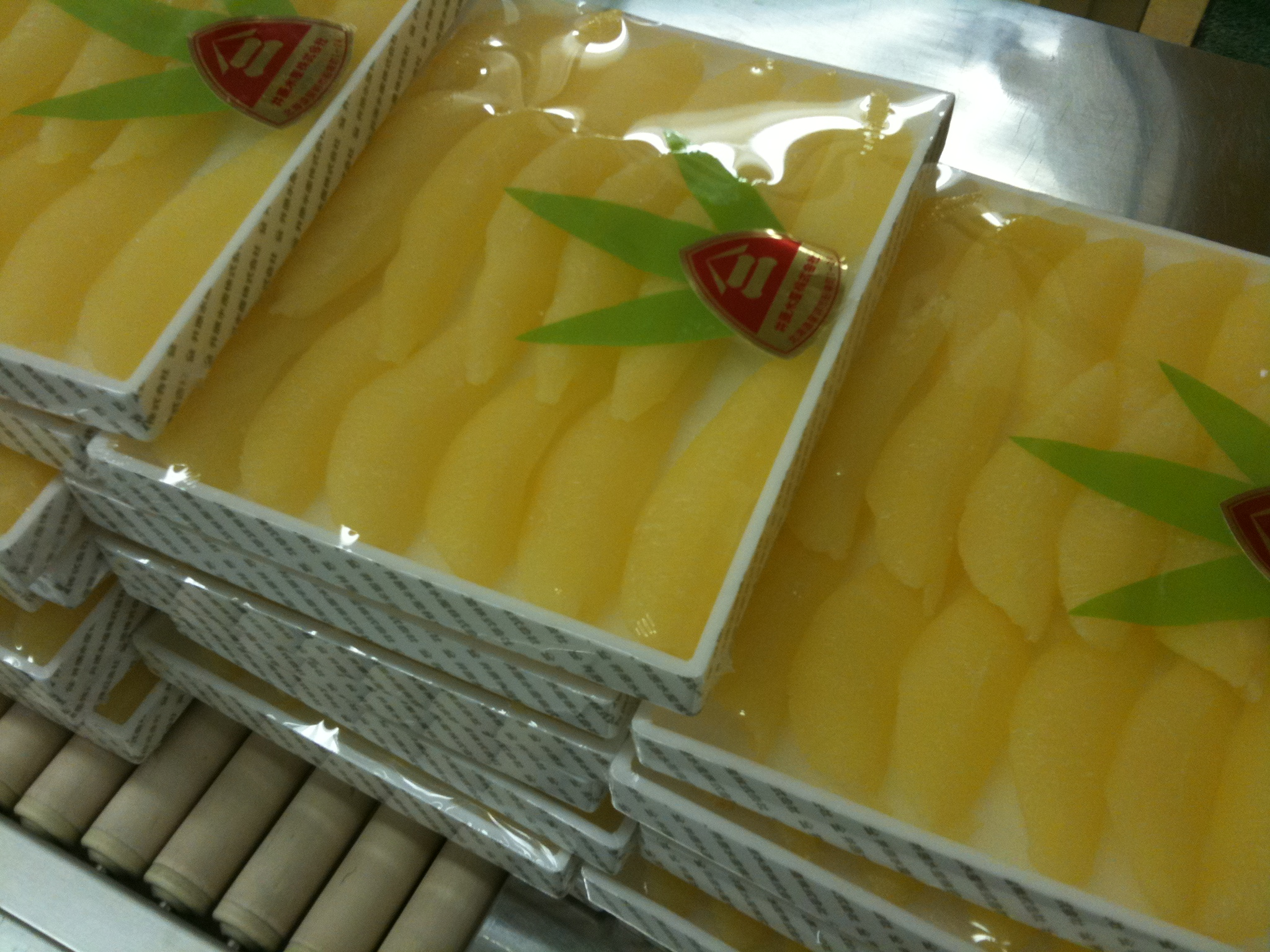
Boxes of kazunoko for sale

In Japan, the custom of serving kazunoko for the New Year's season may date back to the Muromachi Period, according to some sources. As aforementioned, there is the record of kozukozu (不来々々) being served for the New Year according to the mid-Muromachi Period Diary of Ninagawa Chikamoto (親元日記, Chikamoto nikki) (Kanshō 6/1465), but this was actually cod's innards, probably the male cod's milt; howbeit, kozukozu has been treated as an alias for kazunoko by some dictionaries. The kazunoko (かずの子) is attested to be the offspring(eggs) of the kado fish in an even earlier source Satsujōshū (撮壌集) (1454) which names it alongside the kurukuru (alias of kozukozu) (Note: Iinoo Tametane Satsujōshū (撮壌集) (1454): "魚名の内に来々とみえたり。かずの子はかどの子にてこともなきを").

The name kazunoko also appears on the menus in later Muromachi period and Azuchi–Momoyama period documents.

It was offered as menu item during a visit by the Ashikaga shogunate to Echizen Province in 1568 (Eiroku 11), recorded in Asakura-tei onariki (朝倉亭御成記). (Note: The date of the visit was 17th day of 5th lunar month (which converts to 12 June 1568), when the 14th shogun Ashikaga Yoshiharu was still in office, but the actual person hosted was Ashikaga Yoshiaki who would become the 15th shogun. That it was "Yoshiaki" being hosted by Echizen's ruler Asakura Yoshikage is explicit in the primary source. However, a number of sources confound the Ashikaga guest (as Yoshiharu or Yoshiteru).) (Note: This was brought as the 三献。三 (sankon san; '3rd part of the 3rd sake cup') with kazunoko in hiragana, transcribed かずのこ or かづのこ A huge number of dishes are brought just for sidedish or snack to go with the alcohol. Some source implicity assumes the Ashikaga certainly ate the kazunoko.)

Later Toyotomi Hideyoshi was offered kazunoko on the menu when he was hosted by the Maeda clan of Kaga Province, as recorded in the Kaga no chūnagon dono e onari no koto (加賀之中納言殿江御成之事) of the 4th lunar month of Bunroku 3 (1594). (Note: Japanese: 二献。かずの子・かいあはび・さしみ・たい) (Note: Also styled Bunroku sannen Maeda-tei onariki (文禄三年前田亭御成記).Aramata (1989), p. 68 The date was 8th day of ugetsu (lunar 4th month), converted to 17 May 1594.)

=== Edo Period ===
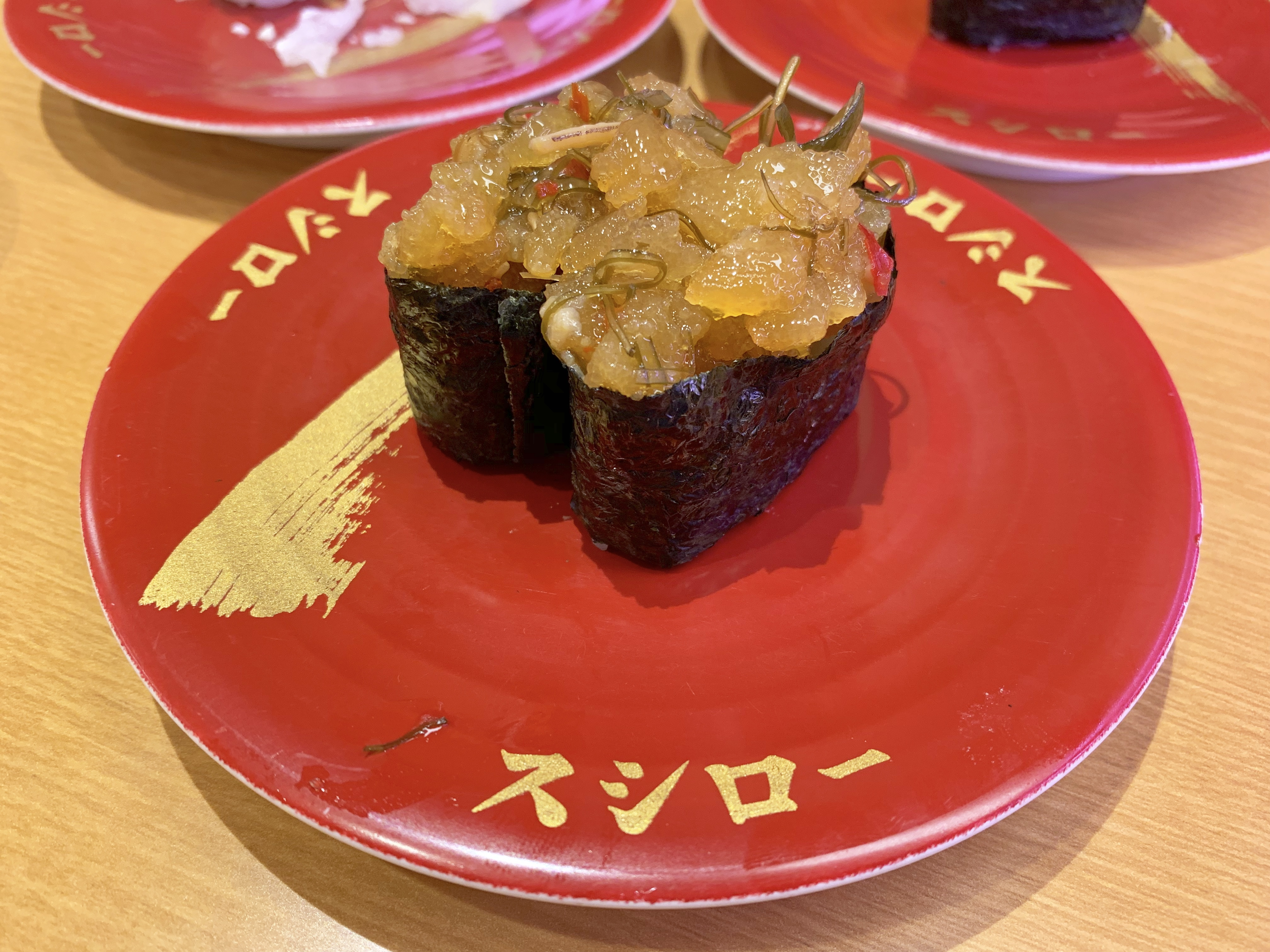
Kazunoko gunkanmaki

In the Edo Period, documents from the Kanbun era (1661–1673) for instance indicate shipments of dried herring and kazunoko occurring out of Ezo (Hokkaido).

The work Honchō shokkan (本朝食鑑) (published 1697) attests that kazunoko was an item that circulated in the market during the lunar 12th and 1st month. (Note: Since Hokkaido's Pacific herring spawn in spring, the harvest must preserved and held in storage until winter.)

The repertoire of herring products was limited until salt became readily available locally and products such as migaki nishin appeared, around the Kyōho] Period. Production of the migaki nishin and kazunoko (for food), as well as dried milt, gills (and guts) for fertilizer are depicted in an 18th-century series of folding screen pictures entitled Esashi-hama nishin no zu (江指浜鰊之図; 'Picture of herring[s] at Esashi beach'). (Note: More fully, the second half(坤/乾坤) of 福田アジオ Esashi Hiyama byō} (江差檜山屏; Esashi Hiyama folding screen'), cf. Fukuda, Ajio, "Foreword まえがき".) Damaged (crumbled) kazunoko pieces were also relegated to becoming fertilizer material. Note that kasu or shimekasu (herring meal squeezed of oil) was not manufactured at this time, and would not commence until several decades later in the early 19th century, or perhaps earlier.

Matsumae clan records from Kyōho 2/1717 show that kazunoko was being loaded on ships from various provinces, while the dried milt and herring for fertilizer headed particularly to the Chūgoku region provinces and Ōmi Province. (Note: Matsumae Ezo ki (『松前蝦夷記』): "Nishin narabi ni kazunoko shirako tomo Easahi mura Matsumaechō ni shikashite shokoku yori fune ki tumi noboru yoshi, toriwake nishin narabini shirako Chūgoku Ōmiji e tsuminobori, ta&hatasaku koyashi ni itashi mōshiyoshi (鯡并鰊子白子共江指村松前町ニ而諸国より船来積登ルよし、取分ケ鯡并白子中国近江路江[へ]積登、田畑作こやしニいたし申よし)" (（『"鯡"+"鰊子" Matsumaechō shi: shiryōhen 松前町史: 史料編』, vol. 1, 1974, p. 382)) (Note: The fertilizer merchants of Ōmi Province received privileged treatment by the Matsumae clan who governed the herring production, Ōmihachiman merchants are the model case in Mizuhara's paper.)

The kazunoko was all part of the fertilizer trade according to some commentators, (Note: Mizuhara also counts kazunoko together as a fertilizer commodity, but in the context of Tenmei era (1780s).) though other sources regard the kazunoko as food item. (Note: Yakumochō yakuba [Municipal office] 八雲町役場 ed. Kumaishichō shi 熊石町史 [History of Kumaishi]: "しかし、これら鰯の干（ほ）し鰯（か）が享保年間頃からあまり獲れなくなり、その代用として近江商人らが、捨てられて省みられなかった胴鯡や白子をその代用として利用し始めた。享保2年の"松前蝦夷記"では「鯡並鯡子とも..", namely, the Ōmi merchants began using the milt and dōnishin which were being discarded as a substitute for the anchovy/sardine hoshika whose supply was falling from the Kyōho period onwards. The dōnishin (胴鰊) here mentioned (also as hanishin (端鰊)) are the carcass and belly part after migaki nishin is removed).『熊石町史』では胴鰊=肥料（端鰊）、数の子=食用、寄席数の子=主に幕府献上のため、と位置付ける。) The document also records that yose kazunoko (寄鰊子) (eggs that were pried apart, re-gathered and molded into rectangles, cf. below) was being sent as kenjōhin or tribute to the Shogunate. The kazunoko during the Tokugawa period were packed in straw tawara (俵), (Note: Hokkai zuihitsu (北海随筆; 'An essay on the Northern Sea', 1739).) then at Osaka unpacked and re-boxed. (Note: Ezokoku shiki/Ezo no kuni shiki (蝦夷国私記; 'Private records of the Ezo', c. Hōreki era, 1750s))

A Kyōho 2/1719 memorandum from the hamayaku ("beach official") also lists kazunoko and yose kazunko as tribute items to the bakufu (shogunate). yosekazunoko (寄数子), aka yoseko (寄せ子) is described as a kazunoko broken up into individual eggs, with stringy tissue removed, then molded into a square shape (or disc-shape), and cut up into smaller rectangular logs to be used. Other sources say yose kazunoko were shaped into squares.

The kazunoko became the byproduct of a much more intensely traded commodity once herring meal (Note: Also "herring guano", "herring manure" in English language sources.) or ニシン粕/〆粕 (nishin kasu/shimekasu; lit 'herring-pressed residue') (Note: The term kasu refers to "residue", referring to what remains after the fish are "boiled, pressed [to extract herring oil] and dried into a mealy state".) began to be manufactured in the 19th century according to one study though some commentators place the date earlier by some decades, as afore stated.

This herring meal (oil residue) grew to become increasingly sought after as a replacement solution to the price-hiking, diminishing supplies of hoshika (干鰯; dried sardine, actually anchovy) fertilizer. (Note: The term hoshika is written as dried iwashi (イワシ) conventionally literally translated as "dried sardine", but somewhat inaccurate, insofar anchovy was the ingredient used more often, The hoshika used as fertilizer was really no different from niboshi used in cuisine, and the aforementioned New Year's dish tazukuri (lit. 'rice-paddy making') was so-named because it used fertilizer fish as ingredient (anchovies, accord. Koizumi, etc.) The hoshika subtype using Japanese sardines/pilchards (maiwashi) was referred by some as "shiro hoshika" or the 'white' variety.)

The 8th Tokugawa shogun Yoshimune, known for his Kyōhō Reforms promoting frugality, allegedly devised a 3-item sake snacks (三つ肴, mitsu zakana) menu: kazunoko, gomame (aka tazukuri, an anchovy dish), and black soybeans to accompany New Year's sake drinking, (Note: The three sakana (肴) or shukō (酒肴; 'sake snack'), namely, the side dishes to accompany the toso imbibed on New Year's occasion.) (Note: The three sake snacks are illustrated with English commentary in a book by "Doctor" Yukio Hattori) (Note: A variant, consisting of kazunoko, tazukuri, and uchimame (flattened soy), served on a sanpō is illustrated in the Edo Period Hirosaki Domain document entitled Nenchū gyōji oiwai kondate narabini sanpō nado okazari (年中行事御祝献立並三方等御飾; roughly tr. 'Menu and arrangement on sanpō for annual events/festivities') (created after 1825/Bunsei 6).) so that the common folk and the shogun alike could celebrate the holiday season in similar fashion.

The salted herring roe (鹽數子（塩数の子, shio kazunoko) was available by the 19th century, and recorded as a tribute item (for the 12th month) to the shogunate either in the Bunka (1804–1818) or Tenpō (1831–1845) eras, supplied by the Matsumae and also Ise-Kameyama Domain. Anecdotal evidence of its being a prized delicacy is that the Ichiriki Chaya restaurant of Kyoto charged 2 shu gold (minted 1824, 1 shu = 1/16 ryō) per dish. (Note: Sasaki (2002), p. 18, citing Nihon suisan seihin shizen 日本水産製品誌全(1935)、pp. 319–320)

== Processing methods ==
Domestically caught kazunoko in Japan were principally the dried type, and though some roe were eaten fresh locally, most were roe harvested and sundried as byproducts of dried herring (migaki nishin) . The "salted" (or brined) type did not overtake the supply until 1954–1955, just when the domestic herring fishery collapsed.

=== Dried ===
There are different grades of dried kazunoko. According to Taishō era government literature, production of hokawari nishin (外割り鰊; subtype of migaki, with the spine removed) entailed the removal of hararago (鮞; roe skein) which were then cleansed in a pool of water, sundried on top of straw mats, then graded for size and quality.

However older (formerly conventional) methods dried the roe without rinsing, so that the adhering blood tissues would cause darkening of the roe as it dried, leading to the method being called kokkan hō (黒乾法; 'black-drying method'). This method was long abandoned by the Showa era. There were subsequently the "modified" and "semi-modified" methods (kairyōhō, hankairyōhō) . Although both involved dousing the roe in saltwater (with water changes) until the blood leeched out sufficiently, the former method was significantly labor-intensive, since it prescribed using precisely measured concentrations of saltwater (4%), and arranging the roe individually. The semi-modified method substituted seawater, and dumping the cleansed roe onto a su (bamboo-braided drip trays).。

=== Salted ===
Salted or shio kazunoko was already mentioned above as tribute to the shogunate, though some seafood processors claim manufacture did not begin until the 1900s (Meiji 30s). According to sources around this time (Meiji 27=1894) a shio kazunoko was made by first "flushing" the roe by submerging in water (changing water several times), then salting the roe in a tub. However (Note: Already there is some brining involved by the time of the Department of Fisheries at the Ministry of Agriculture and Commerce document(1935): salted in barrels, but if the liquid level falls, discoloring occurs rendering the product inedible, so saltwater (saline) needs to be added.) in later years, the method was to cure the roe in saline solution or saturated saline solution.

The "salted" kazunoko intensified in the 1960s and thereafter (Note: Tekishū Motoyama writing at the time says as much,) and according to statistics, the primary fishing ground around Hokkaido (Note: That is to say, the Hokkaido-Sakhalin herring group on the Sea of Japan side.) had little catch beyond 1954, and from that point on, dried kazunoko began to disappear, ceding the market share to salted types.

While still often referred to as "salted" or "salt preserved" by Japanese writers, the product of modern processing methods is probably better characterized as "brined". In fact, sodium chloride solution is used in three steps: first, the egg-bearing (gravid) herring itself is brined in order to stiffen the roe for extraction, second, washed in weak solution, and third, cured in saturated brine.

==== Bleaching ====
After domestic Japanese herring could not be procured, there were ex-Soviet (Russian) frozen herring being imported during the transitional period, (Note: Alaskan herring fishery aimed at harvesting roe did not become a substantial commercially operation until 1964.) and in the narrow margin of time c. 1960 shio kazunoko developed a reputation for gamy odor and inferior quality to dried. However, in 1963, a seafood processing company based in Rumoi, Hokkaido established a technique of bleaching the kazunoko using hydrogen peroxide (Note: Ihara (seafood company) is credited. According to Ihara's website under History (Eng. vers.), "black as night roe from frozen Russian herring" underwent "remov[al of] blood from the roe" at the company's operation at the time. And according to the history (Japanese vers., with timeline) it was in June 1963 (Showa 38) that they conducted research and development on the thawing and peroxide use on frozen egg-bearing herring. And "seeking superior quality, we ventured to Canada and Alaska". Timeline gives April 1967 (Showa 42) as the beginning of the company giving technical advice at Bristol Bay.) The technique also effectively mitigated odor, according to lab results, and the color turned uniformly golden yellow, earning the moniker "yellow dia[mond]" turning it into a high-priced commodity. (Note: According to a collection of newspaper columns written by an ex-worker at Hokkaido during the Showa era, the salted kazunoko became even higher quality than dried, fetching a high price.)

Bleaching is still used in the manufacture of kazunoko. Although excess residue was already being removed from product using enzymes, concern levels rose when studies found that for rats deficient in the specific enzyme catalase, it posed a minor carcinogen risk. In 1980, the Ministry of Health and Welfare did not ban, but mandated zero-level tolerance for residual peroxides in food, and as a result, all the other industries abandoned its use, except for kazunoko operators.

=== Roe-stripping ===
Extracting the egg sacs from fresh (unfrozen) herring, as done in the past was a delicate operation. According to the description of pre-industrial herring processing at Esashi in Ezo country, it is observed that even the removal of the fish from gillnets without scarring the eggs inside involved recruiting inveterate fishermen. Removal of egg sac, milt, etc. was known as nishin tsubushi (鰊潰し; 'herring crushing, squeezing'), (Note: "herring squeezer" is Alaskan English vernacular for gutters or roe-strippers.) and was considered women's work, (Note: Done by fishwives (漁婦) and female day laborers called onna-demen (女出面（でめん）).) and the fish were gutted without a knife, using just the fingers outfitted with finger cots. The roe was dried and made into hoshi kazunoko, but some crumbled pieces wound up as fertilizer, together with the dried milt and gills which were entirely sold as fertilizer.

Herring-squeezing (roe stripping) was not just women's work, but often depended largely on the recruitment of Ainu women. At Sōya (northern tip of Hokkaido), it is explicitly stated, herring-squeezing was the work for menoko (メノコ; 'adult Ainu woman'), according to the work Igen zokuwa (夷諺俗話; 'Tales of Ezo Customs', Kansei 4/1792) concerning the bakufu government's otameshi kōeki (御試交易; 'experimental trade') post there. (Note: Igen zokuwa (夷諺俗話; Kansei4/1792). Also identified merely as a "record" of the Sōya basho experimental trade<"--ソウヤ場所御試交易の記録--> of this date.) (Note: This 1792 document defines tsubushi as gutting, but eleaborates that when this is done, kazunoko, milt, and sasame (gills) are sorted.) Merchants peddled Japanese-made goods to the Ainu on maegashi (前貸し; 'advance loan'), then collect any remaining balance in the form of providing labor for seafood production. At the Aniva Bay operation (southern tip of Sakhalin), there has been found a loan ledger for "sudare", whereby the Ainu made repayments by crafting and delivering the surdare grass screens after the winter season. Any outstanding balance was then copied onto the kazunokocho (数子帳; or presumably read as such), indicating how much debt was still owed, to be discharged by service to kazunoko, etc. production.

According to the 1792 work, removed milt can be handled right away to be dried, but kazunoko are fragile and will break apart unless they are first "rested" for 2 or 3 days in boxes or barrels before manipulating them to be sun-dried.

Later, during the heyday of the earlier Showa era, when domestic production did not depend on freezing technologies, the roe-stripping was done manually from fresh herring.

Early Alaska roe stripping operation from around 1960 employed the coarse method of heaping herring and shoveling salt over it, allowing the fish to "age" for 4, 5 days, after which "herring squeezer" could easily "pop" the roe skein, without need of any skill. (Note: Afterwards, Japanese technicians would grade the kazunoko and pack them in brine in 5 to 6 US gallons (19 to 23 L) plastic buckets.) Though the crude method persisted until the mid-1970s, it was superseded by the practice (since c. 1970) of shipping frozen egg-bearing herring whole to Japan. Freezing firms the roe partially making them more easily removable, and this avoids the problem of industrial waste-management when high concentration salt is used, however, freezing improperly could lead to sponginess of texture.

=== Mold-shaped kazunoko ===
There were kazunoko remolded into disks or squares after being dissembled, called yose kazunoko, which used to be presented to the shogun, as aforementioned. In more recent times, stray eggs gathered were salvaged and solidified together, then cut out into flower-shapes, to be sold as hana kazunoko. Also imitation kazunoko have been made using capelin eggs as substitute (though stray herring eggs may also be added).

== Fishing grounds ==
The main fishing grounds for herring were in Hokkaido (formerly Ezochi), targeting the particular schools that feed and spawn on the Sea of Japan side. Thus the main production center administrated by the Matsumae clan was at Esashi (or Matsumae), on the southwestern coast. Later, the clan extended control over the fisheries north and eastward, as far as Southern Sakhalin (Minami Karafuto), and opened Hakodate port on the east coast.

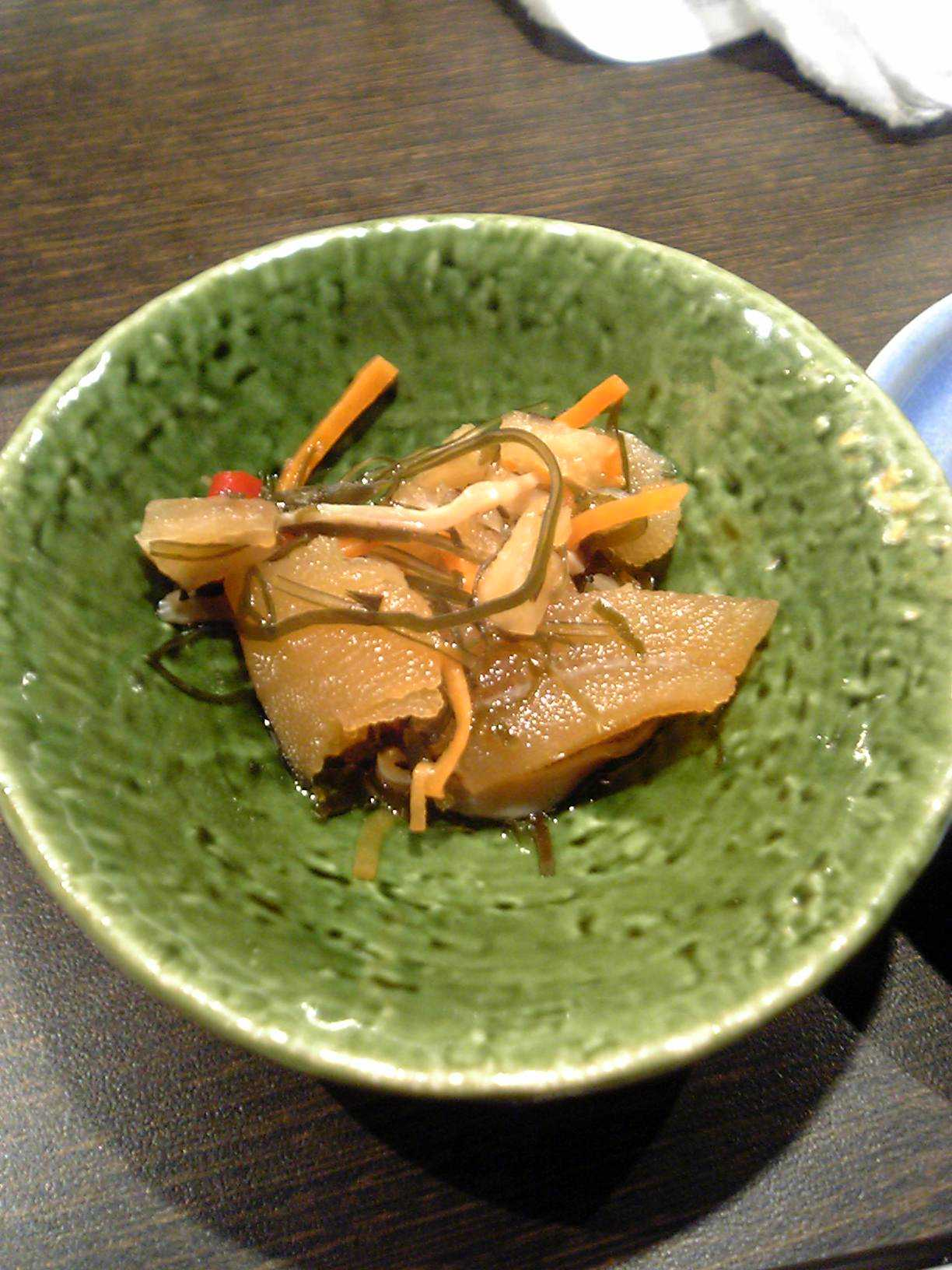
Matsumaezuke, pickles with herring roe

The Matsumae clan was outsourcing the seafood fishing and trade to merchants basho or akinaiba trading posts, (Note: Though originally meant for retainers to conduct the trade, the shift happened within a few years.) in a contracting system (basho ukeoi-sei). The clan lost control of the territory and fishing trade in Ezo to the central government (shogunate) for certain periods. (Note: Howell summaries as "between 1799 and 1821 and again from 1854 until the collapse of the Tokugawa regime in 1858".) responding to a perceived Russian threat. The herring production in Sakhalin thus shifted between Japanese control (Tokugawa period, Meiji to Showa) and Russia (postwar).including kazunoko. (Note: Trade in Sakhalin was conducted already during the Tokugawa period, and in later years Ansei Era (1854–1860), the Hakodate Magistrate establish the Kita Ezo Kaisho nearby to conduct the Sakhalin trade, via bidding, however, the magistrate also published a standard normal price list for kazunoko and other goods: kazunoko 1300 mon for 8 kanme or 30 kilograms (66 lb); milt 1500 mon for 20 kanme; herring oil 3400 mon per chō (挺) barrel; herring kasu meal 1 ryō per 60 kanme) (Note: According to Russian statistics before war in 1905, the Ainu received for a bag of herring roe 4 rubles, dried milt 3 rubles, 100 pieces of salted herring 50–80 copecks.) (Note: Cf. Thornton & Moss (2021), p. 25: Russian Far East in the post- 1970s, shifted focus on "gravid herring (those with females rich with eggs".)

After the principal fishing grounds on the Seas of Japan side collapsed c. 1955 (Showa 30), as aforementioned, and for a few years thereafter, Japanese herring ships had to operate in greatly scaled-down fashion seeking regional herring groups, or at Gulf of Patience and Aniva Bay in Southern Sakhalin The egg-bearing (or "gravid") herring were being imported from Russia in the 1960s and 1970s, and also in increasingly large volumes from Alaska from c. 1960 onward, as aforementioned (§ Imports into Japan). In the year 1980 (Showa 55) the "bubble burst" for the herring roe industry. Prices soared, with rumors of speculative hoarding. The government stiffened regulation on peroxide bleaching agents. The market reacted by not buying, and companies were left with a huge dead inventories of overpaid herring roe.

=== Imports into Japan ===
As already discussed, Japan largely imports Pacific herring roe from British Columbia, Canada and Alaska, USA, as well as Atlantic herring roe from Europe.

Alaska has been known for having some of the shortest seasons for the catch, sometimes counted in hours. Alaska's allotted quotas at the main fisheries (mostly targeting roe herring) in 2022 were: Sitka Sound, late March,45,164 short tons (41,000 t; 90 million pounds), Kodiak Island, April, 8,075 short tons (7,000 t; 16 million pounds), and Togiak (Note: Both purse seine and gillnet fishing here.), May, 65,107 short tons (59,000 t; 130 million pounds). However, there was no prospect of catching full quotas. Japanese taste had changed, and the price fallen since the $1000 per ton in the heyday of the 1990s, and the gross receipt of $60 million for the fishermen has fallen to $5 million by 2020. In 2023, Togjk's last processing plant indicate it would not be buying for the coming year, and the fishing season was cancelled.

There has also been criticism regarding the harvesting of herring in Alaska primarily for the herring roe cash value, since all the male and rest of the female fish, about 90% in weight of the catch, were discarded up to the 1990s, minced into liquid sludge. Though this was replaced with using the residue as meal for petfood or fertilizer, issues have been raised regarding this non-optimal use of resources from a bioenergetics standpoint. The problem of sludge waste has been also discussed in the literature concerning Canadian processing plants (cf. "stickwater").

== First Nations food source ==
The native peoples of the Pacific coast of Canada and Alaska (current major producing regions of kazunoko) have had a tradition of gathering herring eggs on seafood or wood branches during the spring herring runs when the fish come to spawn.

The Sitka, Alaska area was one of the oldest Tlingit village settlements, and had been collecting eggs on seaweed or hemlock branches since time immemorial, according to descendant testimony. These are the spawn on kelp (Tlingit: daaw) or on hemlock (haaw). One seaweed type used is called "hair kelp" or "hair seaweed" though not a "kelp" in a strict sense, identified as Desmarestia sp. or more precisely Desmarestia viridis, belonging to a non-kelp ordo. There are a number of testimonies from European explorers during the 18th and 19th centuries. (Note: French explorer Étienne Marchand during his expedition aboard the Solide (1790–92) witnessed the "Tchinkitanay" (Sitka Tlingit) eating lumps of dried fish eggs, assumed to be herring roe. The German Aurel Krause during his 1881–82 voyage reached Sitaka on 25 April 1882, reported that "Everywhere along the beach I see fisheggs {herring eggs} being dried on strings hung up between poles. Some fisheggs are spread on rocks and cloths". Jefferson Franklin Moser (1899) also said that various tribes came to Sitka Sound in April when the "herring.. deposit [their: eggs in the sea grass, rockweed", and the "Indians [place] hemlock twigs at the low-water mark..after which they are gathered in canoe loads". He claims the name "Alask grapes" had been conferred on the edible egg clusters. And that the natives eat it with "rancid oil" (cf. candlefish oil).) (Note: Sitka Tlingits before commercial operations (before the 1950s?) still harvested herring roe on small rowboats.)

The Haida who inhabit Haida Gwaii (formerly Queen Charlotte Islands) in Canada as a base point (Note: But disparate populations occur in Alaska also.) also traditionally gather k'aaw (Note: "k'aaw (S, M)" i.e. Skidegate or Masset dialects. It is k'áaw (A) in Alaskan dialect. While "kelp" is variously called ngall, ng, aal (S, M) or k'aay (S, M).) These may be eaten fresh on site, or may be sun-dried, and the dried may be eaten as is, or reconstituted in water then blanched or fried. (Note: eulachon (candlefish) oil often is used as a sauce.)

A seaweed known in Haida as "raven's moustache" (x̱uya sg̱yuug̱a") in Haida folklore is said to be usable, but inferior to hemlock as a medium for gathering eggs. Probably a Desmarestia species is meant here also. (Note: Turner (2004), pp. 95, 207, 264 notes that John James Enrico (doctorate in 1980) theorized Desmarestia intermedia.) Again Western Hemlock (Tsuga heterophylla) is the species of the branch used to lure egg-laying. The attached Haida origin myth holds that when the Raven stuck his beak in the dancing hall of the Herring People, the eggs stuck on his mustache were not so appetizing, so he discarded the mustache, which became seaweed. He then stuck a sprig of hemlock in the hall, which grew thick with egg and was good-tasting. Hence the lesson to mankind that hemlock is the better implement to use. (Note: The tale was collected by Swanton from Walter McGregor member of the Qā'ial lā'nas clan) (Note: There are variants to the origin myth, differing in the characters involved, etc.; two examples are given in a paper.)

On the opposite from the Haida dwell the Tsimshian of Lax Kwʼalaams (formerly Port Simpson), who also engaged in the egg-gathering practices. In the Tsimshian languages, the spawn on hemlock branches are called xs'waanx (Note: Though according to dictionary, xs'waanx refers to herring spawn on either kelp or branches, while the kazunoko inside the herring are called {lang). And spawn-on-kelp are also locally referred to as gyoos meaning "kelp". (Note: Dunn's dictionary identifies gyoos as kelp with the Latin name Grinella, which is obsolete taxon, and the online version supplements this to be Macrocystis (i.e. giant kelp).)

In the Bristol Bay (east extreme of Bering Sea) area including Togiak and nearby communities, (Note: Wright & Chythlook (1985) employs the term "Togiak district".) the Yup'ik also traditionally engaged in fishing herring and gathering their eggs. The spawn on kelp (Central Alaskan Yupʼik: qaryaq, (Note: Wright & Chythlook (1985), p. 31 writes that "herring spawn-on-kelp" is melucuaq, but according to the Yup'ik dictionary, the herring egg in singular is melucuaq or qaarsaq whereas the plural or the egg skein (kazunoko) collectively would be elquaq, and "herring egg on kelp" is qaryaq.)) are preserved frozen, salted, or dried, and customarily eaten with seal oil. (Note: The Wright & Chythlook (1985) paper survey concentrates on residents of "Togiak district" (Togiak, Twin Hills, Manokotak, Aleknagik, Dillingham, Clark's Point).) Yup'ik communities on Nelson Island (Alaska) (Note: Tununak, Newtok, Toksook Bay, Nightmute.) also go out to sea to collect spawn on kelp. Although residents say they usually consume these quickly, they may preserve spawn on kelp packed in seal oil, inside a sealskin poke (puuq), as they do with preserve herrings. (Note: Storing herring in seal oil inside pokes is common also to Iñupiat interviewed in Shishmaref, Alaska.) The Bering Strait zone is generally Iñupiat country, but an informant from Stebbins (which was settled by Nelson Islanders) stated that the collection of spawn on kelp (Yup'ik, Neson-Stebbins subdialect: ellquat) is a time honored tradition. (Note: In this dialect, dried herring roe is called imlaat. Cf. glossary.) The Iñupiat of the region also gather and consume herring egg.

== Ainu cuisine ==
In Ainu cuisine there is a dish named after the cow parsnip Heracleum lanatum (syn. Heracleum maximum. Japanese: hanaudo, actually ōhanaudo) (Note: Although Chiri's dictionary gives the species Heracleum lanatum and Japanese: hanaudo, this scientific name is now matched with ōhanaudo, whereas hanaudo is Heracleum sphondylium only distributed further south than Hokkaido. Heracleum dulce given by Williams is another synonym for H. lanatum.) that adds herring roe as ingredient. The foraged vegetable is called pittok (ピットㇰ) or siturukina (シト゜ルキナ) and the stems, or more precisely the stalks of the radical leaves which have been peeled and preserved are reconstituted and sliced up. Dried herring roe (Ainu: pere (ペレ/ぺレー) and seal fat are pounded until milky white, and mixed with the vegetable and diatomaceous earth (added to counteract the acerbity. The liquid squeezed from this dish was used as ersatz milk for infants.). (Note: Williams instead writes the "gruel" is "given to a mother whose milk supply had ceased", but such attributes are noted for tsuru ninjin (ツルニンジン; Codonopsis lanceolata).)

== In poetry ==
In haiku poetry, kazunoko is a kigo (季語; 'season word') for the New Year season and jinji (human affairs). An example Kazunoko ni itokenaki ha wo narashi keri (数の子にいとけなき歯を鳴らしけり; "Herring roe, upon which the young 'uns teeth resound") read by Mokkoku Tamura.

== See also ==
- roe
- Matsumaezuke
- Surströmming – Swedish femented herring which sometimes contain roe, but should be avoided from consumption.
- Polish cuisine – śledź po japońsku or "Japanese-style herring". Allegedly originated after Japanese use of "herring eggs" was garbled with "herring and [chicken] eggs".
