= Carrier molecules =

Carrier molecules may refer to:

- Carrier proteins – Membrane protein involved in transportation
- Carrier DNA – Inert DNA used to improve the efficiency of nucleic acid precipitation and purification
- Carrier RNA, which is used in a similar manner to carrier DNA
