= Matsumaezuke =

Pickled dish from Matsumae, Hokkaidō, Japan

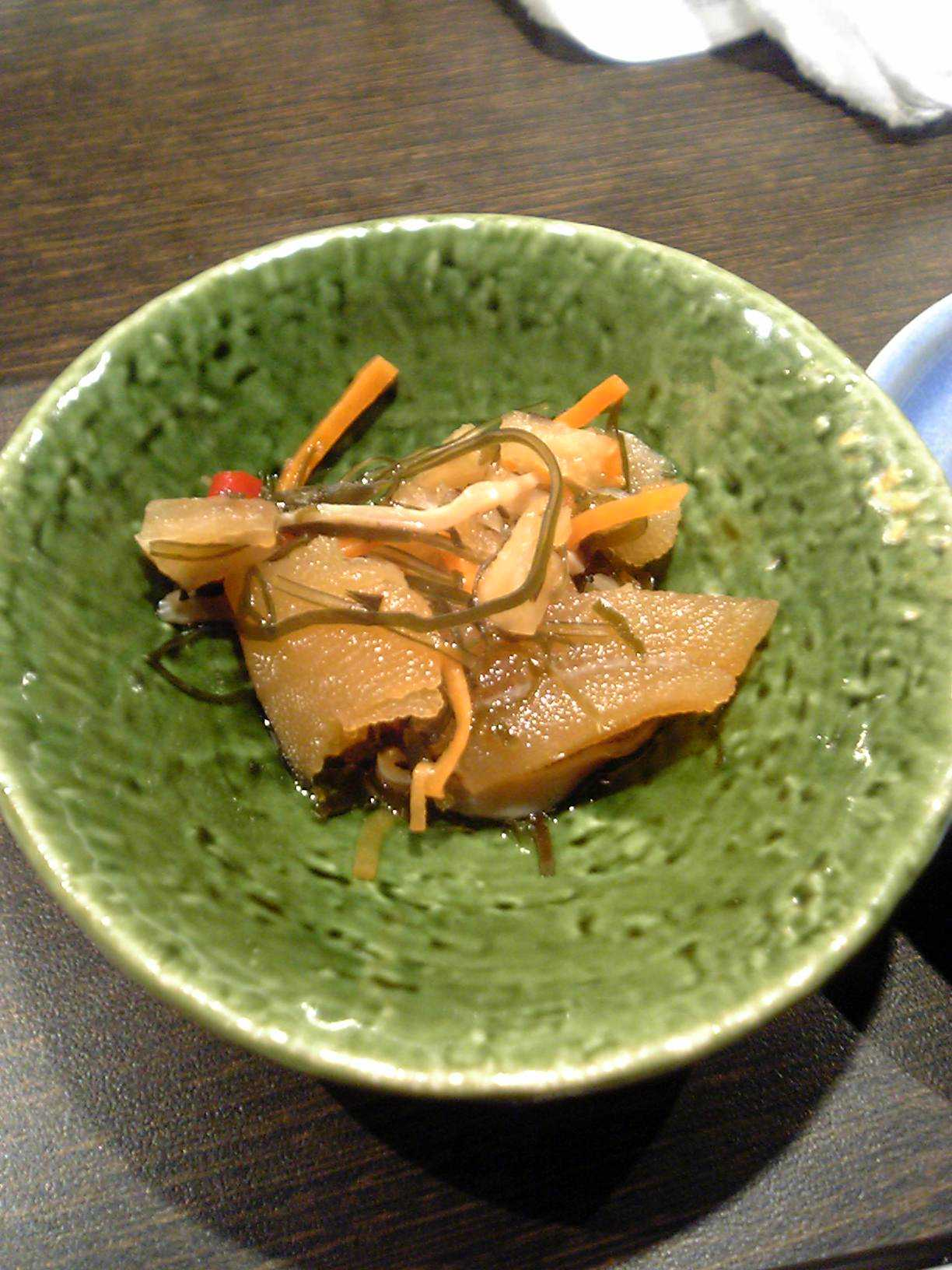
Matsumaezuke

Matsumaezuke (松前漬け) is a pickled dish of dried squid and kelp, native to Hokkaidō, Japan, named in reference to the Matsumae clan which once governed the region, then known as Ezo.

It is made from dried and preserved seafood products from Hokkaidō. Surume (dried squid) and konbu are cut into thin strips with scissors, Kazunoko (herring roe) are broken up into small bits, with other ingredients added depending on recipe. The ingredients are cured in sweet soy sauce, or marinade of sake, soy sauce and mirin, for several days.

== History ==
There are conflicting claims as to the evolution of the dish.

According to the publication from the ex-MITI governmental research body Tsūsan kikaku chōsakai (1987), matsumaezuke developed naturally within the Matsumae domain in Ezo (Ainu country), among the immigrating wajin populace (non-native mainland Japanese), using dried squid (surume) and kombu kelp, which were the locally abundant trade commodities. It can probably be dated to around the Kansei era (1789-1801), (Note: Corrected from the publication which states Kansei (寛永), since that falls within 1624–1644, and is prior to Matsumae-shi (clan) becoming a han (feudal clan) in 1719 (Kyoho era), and for other reasons.) when kitamae ships began to bring readily available supplies of soy sauce, etc., into the area. The name "Matsumae zuke" did not originate then, and the dish was simply called kobuika (こぶいか; 'kelp-squid') or ika no shōyu zuke (いかの醤油漬; 'squid-soy sauce-pickle'). The "Matsumaezuke" nickname was coined in the Shōwa era, and though originally a squid and kelp only preserve, a type adding kazunoko (herring roe) began to circulate around Showa 4 (1929).

The same government research body in earlier published books provided a different account, stating that the matsumaezuke, "as a chinmi whose recipe was held as secret 'not to leave its gates', was endeared to the successive daimyo lords of the Matsumae feudal clan".

Alternately, Yamagata-ya of Hakodate, which lays claim to being the ganso (元祖; 'the original') matsumae zuke, explains that this was something "made at home in the southern Hokkaido region, as a salted pickle overnight", but the company founder changed it to a soy sauce pickling recipe and marketed as a product in Showa 13 (1938). The item would eventually gain name recognition nationwide.

In the 1950s, Japan's herring fisheries collapsed, and by the mid 1960s and thereafter, kazunoko became more of an "expensive delicacy" item nicknamed "yellow diamond", though it continues to be used.

As for the naming, it has been observed that the Hokkaido produce which is ma-kombu (sweet kelp) went by the nickname Matsumae kombu (松前昆布) (or simply Matsumae (まつまえ)) and consequently this and other dishes which used kelp often had "Matsumae~" prefixed upon its name (e.g. Matsumaezushi, Matumaeni, Matsumaemushi, Matsumaemaki).

== Recipe ==
A soy sauce on the sweet-side, or a marinade blending soy sauce with (sweet) mirin are said to be used.

Nowadays, there a Matsumae zuke sets or kits (precut squid and kelp) available for easy preparation, but to create from scratch, below is a home-cooking recipe published in newspaper:

- The kazunoko must be soaked in dilute saltwater beforehand, overnight.
- The dried squid and kombu should be cleaned by sponging off any debris using wet cloth (paper towel dampened with sake), then cut into fine ribbons using kitchen scissors. The kazunoko are broken up into bits before adding. If carrots are used they should be julienned.
- Moisten and soften the cut squid, and blend with other ingredients in a marinade made from sake, soy sauce, and mirin heated to boil and cooled off.
- Keep refrigerated, stirring several times per day. Ready to serve after about 3 days.

Although use of carrots is not universal, some dictionary references list carrot or daikon radish. (Note: Okuyma lists "kelp, dried squid, daikon, kazunoko, yuzu peel" as an ingredient.) A tai (sea bream, in sashimi form) is sometimes blended.

In addition to the flavor and texture, the kombu adds a slimy viscosity considered desirable and healthy, and though traditionally high quality ma-kombu is to be used a suggested trending alternative is to admix a more mucusy species of kelp known as gagome. (Note: This is also sold precut as kizami kombu (gagome type), or under such trade names as natto kombu.)

== See also ==
- chinmi – Japanese term referring to rare food delicacies
- ikaninjin - Squid and carrots. Alternative claim is that this was the original recipe which later became matsumaezuke
- Namasu (Food) - kōhaku namasu (紅白なます), a carrots and daikon osechi
