= Kjellmaniella =

Scientific classification
- Domain: Eukaryota
- Clade: Sar
- Clade: Stramenopiles
- Division: Ochrophyta
- Class: Phaeophyceae
- Order: Laminariales
- Family: Laminariaceae
- Genus: Kjellmaniella; Miyabe, 1902
- Species: K. crassifolia

Binomial name
- Kjellmaniella crassifolia Miyabe, 1902

Synonyms
- Saccharina sculpera C.E. Lane, C. Mayes, Druehl & G.W. Saunders 2006

Species of brown algae

Kjellmaniella is a monotypic genus of kelp (large brown algae) comprising the species Kjellmaniella crassifolia, known as kagome (カゴメ/籠目) in Japanese. The species has received attention in recent years for fucoidan content and its multilateral profile of fucoidan chemicals compared to other seaweeds. It is now used in dietary supplements, cosmetics, and various processed foods (Cf. § Uses for the particulars).

It is characterized by textures appearing on the frond, described as dekoboko (凸凹; paraphrasable as 'bumps and dimples') or "gyrations".

== Taxonomy ==
The compounded name kagome kombu (カゴメコンブ/籠目昆布; 'kagome kelp') was proposed as standard Japanese common name in 2007. (Note: Yotsukura (2007).) This was prompted by reclassification under the Saccharina genus by Lane et al., 2006, though this was later reversed back to Kjellmaniella by Starko et al., 2019, cowritten by Yotsukura. The algae is also known informally as gamo in the seafood market.

== Distribution and habitat ==
Kjellmaniella is found growing in the waters of Japan, Korea and Russian Far East (and Sakhalin). In the waters around Japan, the seaweed grows from southern Hokkaido down to the northern coasts of Shimokita Peninsula in Aomori Prefecture. They also grow in south Sakhalin, the vicinity of Strait of Tartary and the northern east coasts of the Korean Peninsula.

It occupies subtidal or sublittoral habitats similar to kombu but in deeper waters, found anchored to rocky substrates by its holdfast connected to the stipe. The latter bears undivided blades, as typical for kelp species.

== Uses ==
=== Culinary ===
The seaweed is edible. Among its use as processed foods include tororo kombu or oboro kombu (machine- or hand-shaved shavings), Matsumae-zuke, and shio kombu (simmered in soy sauce).

A rice dish called kagome meshi (かごめ飯) was developed in a collaborative effort for Hakodate city, as a new signature food item. As the name may suggest, this is rice mixed with chopped gagome seaweed, topped with various seafood.

The gagome (개다지마[?], gaedajima[?]) is also amongst the seaweed harvested as "foodstuff" in parts of Korea also.

=== Other ===
In Hakodate, during the COVID-19 scare, gagome-kombu candy drops were freely distributed, with a costumed person dressed up as yuru-chara mascot Kagomeman (カゴメマン), designed by Prof. Hajime Yasui of Hokkaido U., participating in the handing-out.

== See also ==
- Edible seaweed – Algae that can be used for culinary purposes
- Fucoidan – Sulfated polysaccharides
- Kelp – Large brown seaweeds in the order Laminariales
