= Milt =

Fish seminal fluid and sacs

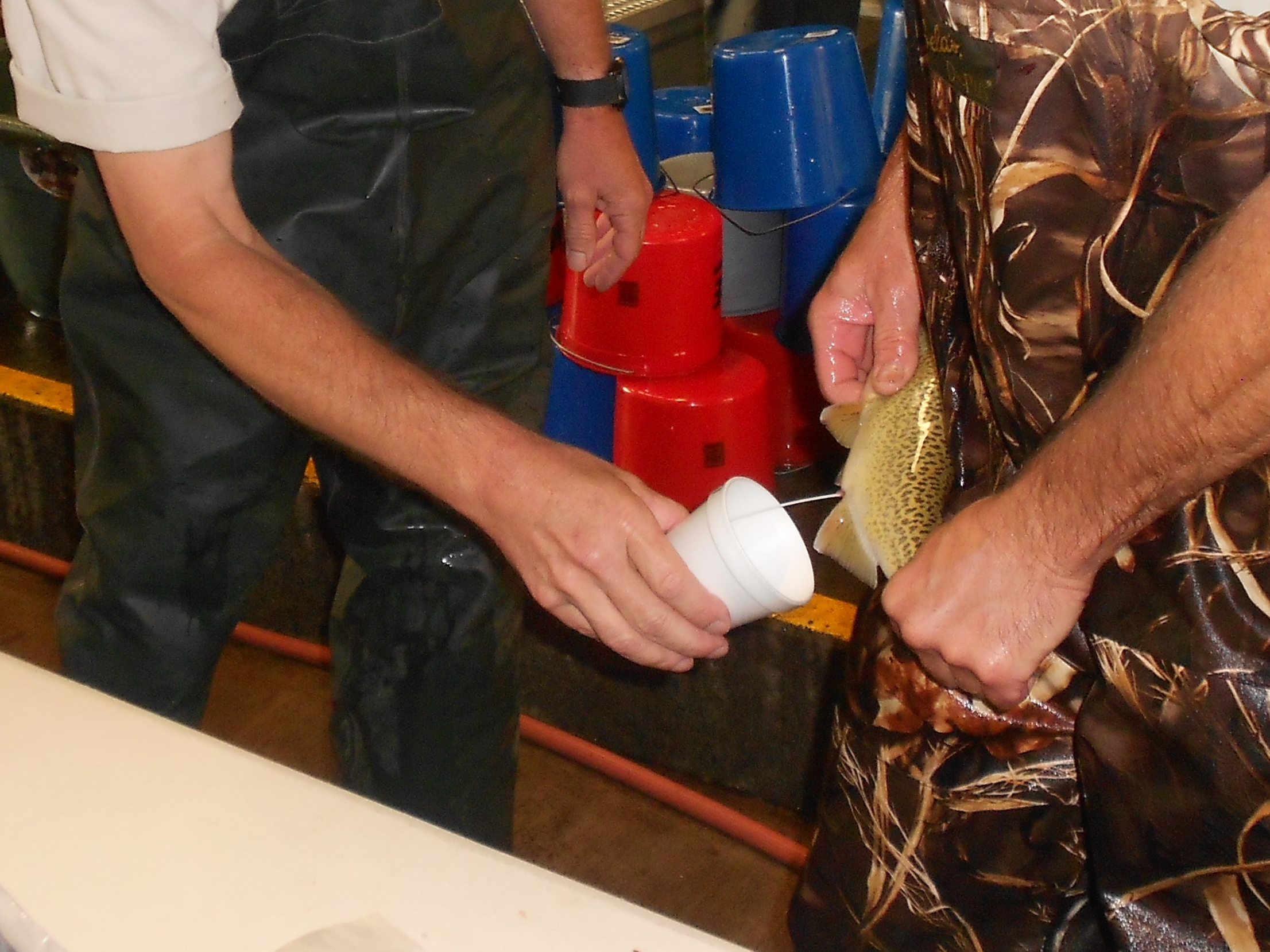
Collecting Chinook salmon milt at a USFWS hatchery

Milt is the seminal fluid of fish, mollusks, and certain other water-dwelling animals. They reproduce by spraying this fluid, which contains the sperm, onto roe (fish eggs). It can also refer to the sperm sacs or testes that contain the semen.

Milt (sometimes spelled melt) also refers to soft roe, the male genitalia of fish when they contain sperm, used as food. Many cultures eat milt, often fried, though not usually as a dish by itself. As a food item, milt is farmed year-round in nitrogen tanks, through hormone induction or photoperiod control.

== Production ==
Production of milt may be affected by external stimuli. Goldfish are known to produce more milt when isolated from other males in their group, but will continue to produce high levels even when exposed to the scent of an unfamiliar male, suggesting that milt production is affected by close contact to rival males. Milt production is also stimulated by the scent of a female fish. Milt itself may contain pheromones that attract ovulating females.

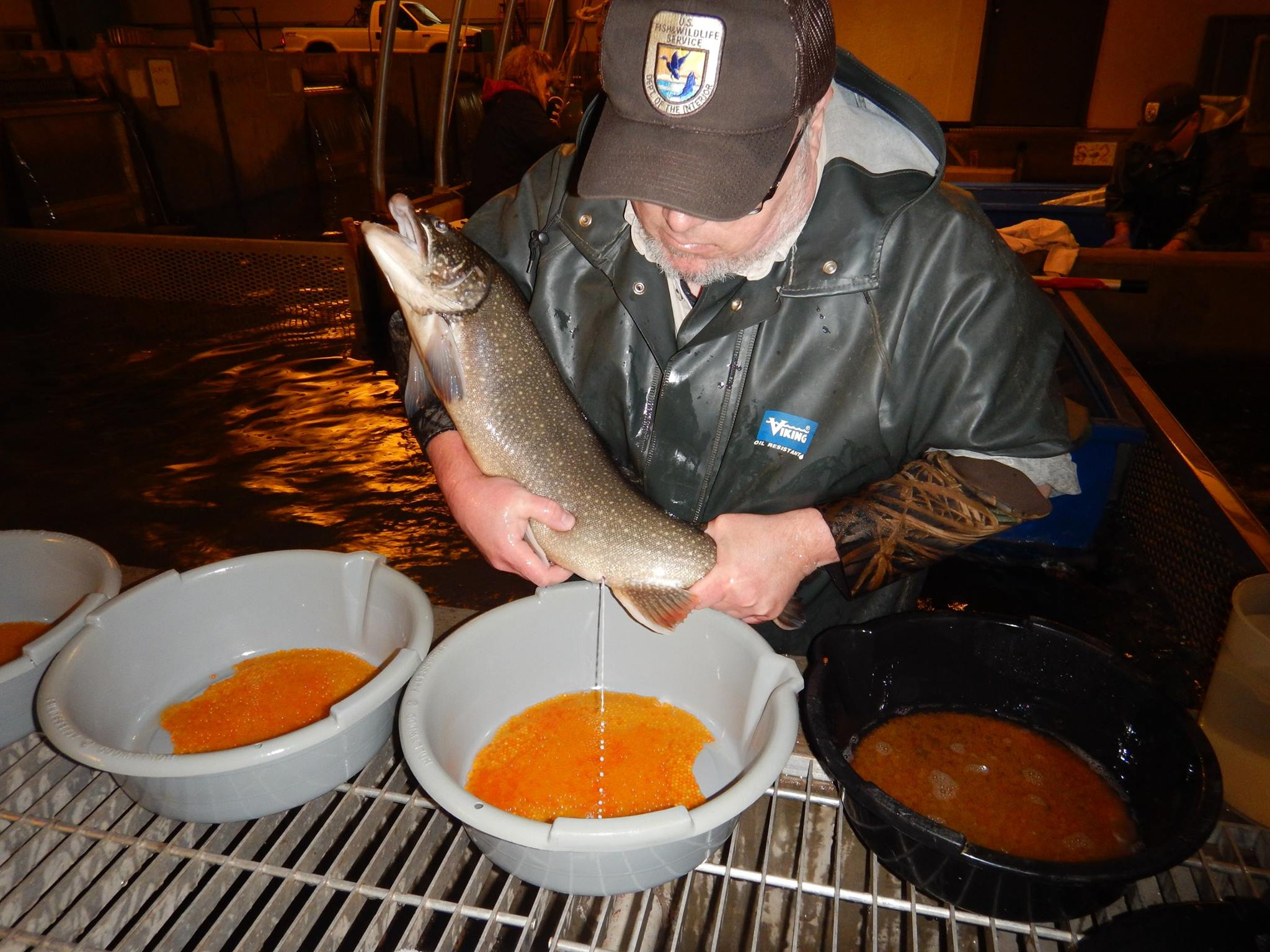
Milt from a lake trout being used to fertilize eggs

Intersex fish are less likely to release milt, or may fail to produce milt at all, due to their sperm ducts being blocked. Even when intersex fish do produce milt, the sperm density is lower than normal, and the sperm that is present typically has less motility than normal. Triploid fish can sire offspring, but said offspring have low hatch rates and high mortality rates. For this reason, some hatcheries may intentionally produce triploid fish to keep them from hybridizing or competing with native fish.

Chemical composition of milt varies slightly by species. Herring milt is 82.5% water, 2% fat, 16.7% protein, and 2% ash for fish with 21% milt. Cod milt is 82% water, 1.1% fat, 14.5% protein, and 1.8% ash.

== Use in captive breeding ==
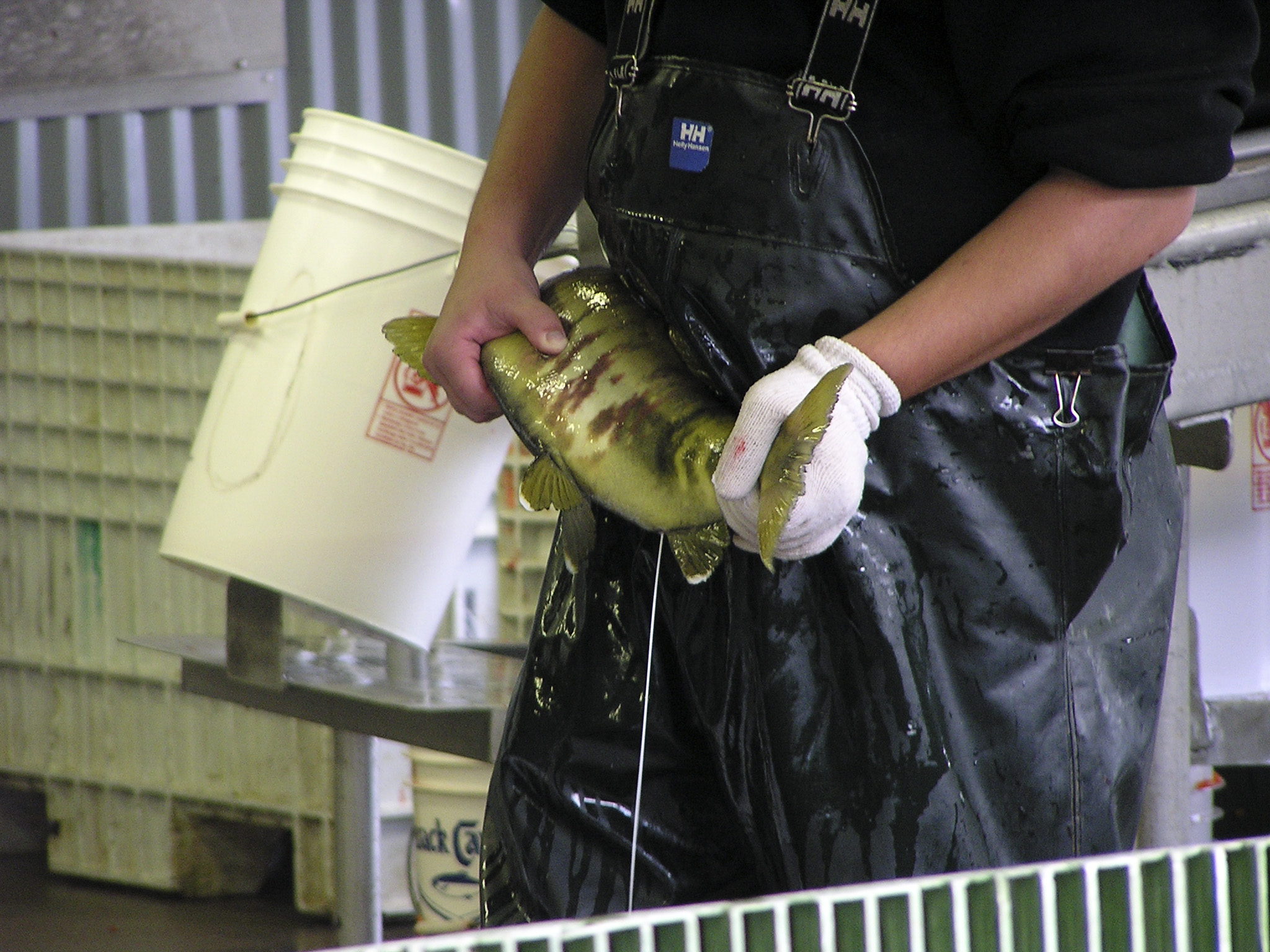
Milt collection at an Alaskan hatchery

At fish hatcheries, workers manually squeeze milt out of male fish, then use the milt to fertilize harvested eggs. This can be done to many fish while alive, and afterwards the fish can be released. Pacific salmon hatcheries are an exception; the fish, returning from migration, are killed via a guillotine and then the milt is poured over eggs, either by squeezing the male over them or by putting the milt in a dropper and squeezing it in.

After collection, milt may be refrigerated for brief periods of time to increase sperm motility. Pacu milt, for example, will still have live sperm after 8 hours, and the motility will be higher compared to milt stored at room temperature. This is not true of all species, however; the longer the milt of the steelhead trout is stored, the higher the mortality rate of the hatchlings it produces.

Milt removed from dead fish can still be fertile hours after the fish's death. A blacktail redhorse's milt, for one, is still fertile an hour after the fish has died; chinook salmon milt, for another, is still fertile up to five hours after the fish has died. Milt is still fertile even if the fish it came from was killed by piscicide.

== Milt as food ==
Though many North Americans find the consumption of milt taboo, it is popular in many Asian and European cuisines, and has been called "the male counterpart to caviar".

=== Asian cuisine ===
- In Indonesian cuisine, the milt (called telur ikan 'fish egg') of snakehead and snapper is usually made into kari or woku.
- In Japanese cuisine, the testes (白子 shirako 'white children') of cod (tara), anglerfish (ankō), salmon (sake), squid (ika) and pufferfish (fugu) are eaten.
- In Korean cuisine, the milt (이리 iri) of Alaska pollock, cod, blackmouth angler, bogeo, and sea bream are eaten.

=== European cuisine ===
- In Romanian cuisine, the milt of carp and other fresh water fish is called lapți (from the Latin word lactes) and is usually fried.
- In Russian cuisine, herring milt (молока, moloka) is pickled the same way as the rest of the fish, but eaten separately, sometimes combined with pickled herring roe. Various whitefish soft roes are usually consumed fried and it is an inexpensive everyday dish.
- In Sicilian cuisine, the milt of tuna is called lattume and is used as a typical pasta topping.
- In British cuisine, cod soft roes are a traditional dish, usually fried in butter and spread on toast.
- In Czech cuisine, the milt of common carp called mlíčí (from the Czech word mléko – "milk") is often used in a fish soup served on Christmas Eve.
- In Ashkenazi Jewish cuisine, kratsborscht is a sauce made from milt.
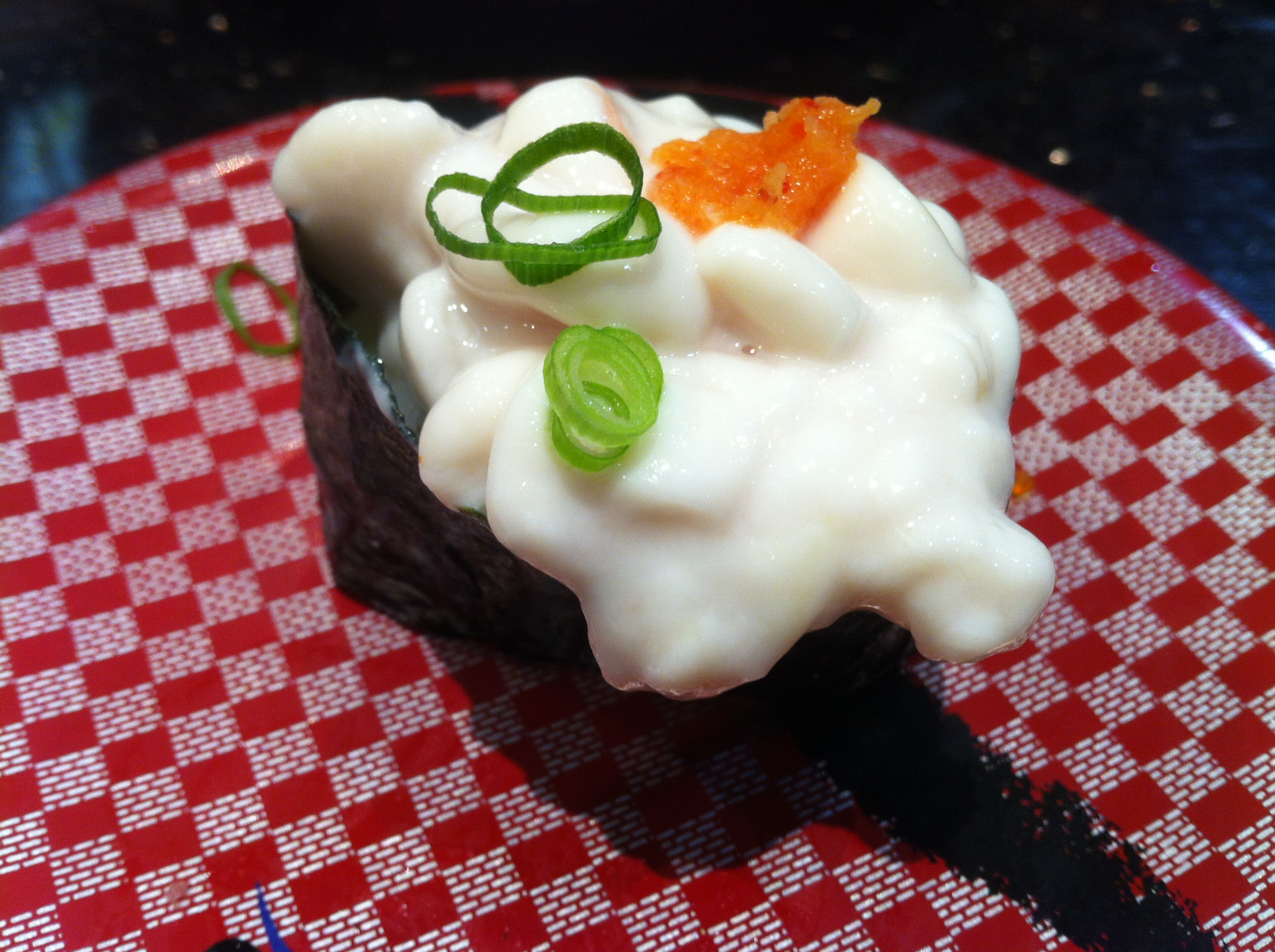
Japanese shirako (cod milt) gunkanmaki

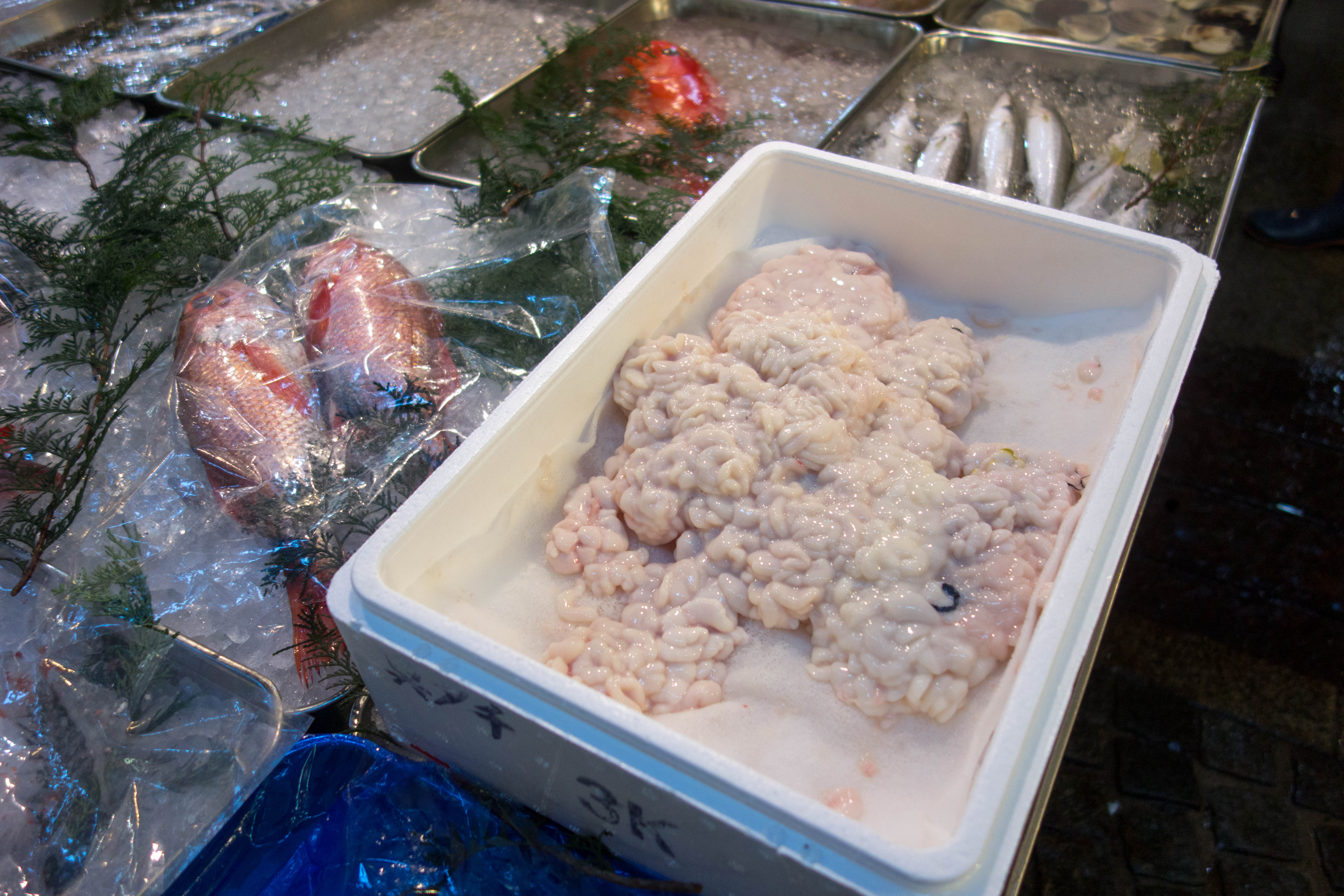
Smelt milt

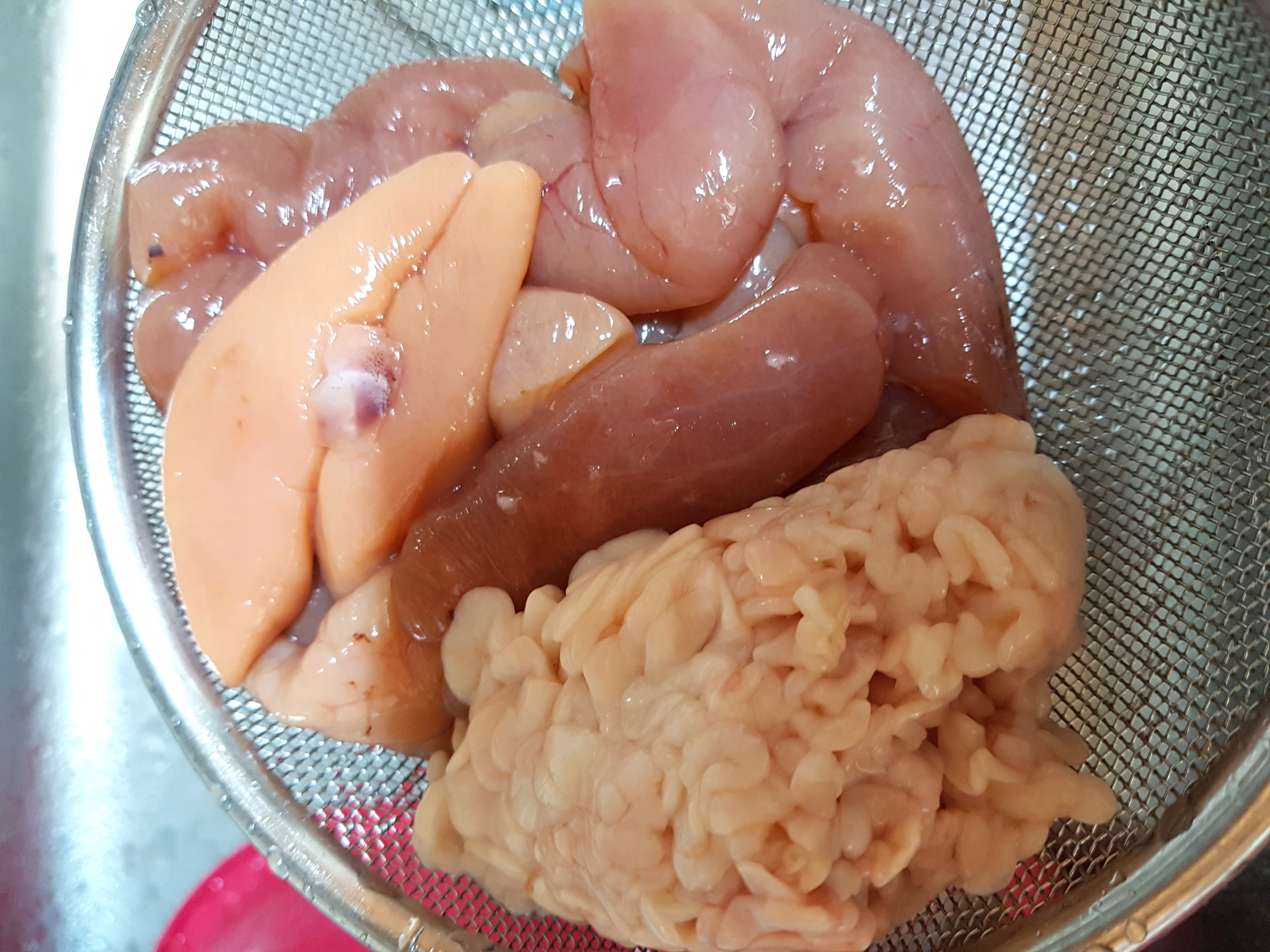
Alaska pollock's liver, roe, and milt

== Other uses ==
Milt is highly absorbent of rare earth elements such as neodymium and iron. The heavier the rare earth element, the higher its affinity for milt. Because of this, it has been proposed as an environmentally-friendly way to recover rare earth elements from waste.

Salmon sperm is commonly used as carrier DNA in various scientific procedures due to its abundance and cost-effectiveness.

== See also ==
- List of delicacies
