= Blue-backed fish =

Category of fish in Japanese cuisine

Blue-backed fish (背の青い魚 se no aoi sakana); also referred to as Blue-fish (青魚 aozakana) is a category of fish used in Japanese cuisine that have a rich and fatty taste, and are distinguished from another category of white meat fish that tend to have a lighter and more delicate flavor. It is not a scientific categorization, but refers to commonness in outer appearance, fleshiness and oiliness and include such species of fish as sardine, mackerel, herring, perch and anchovy. Blue-backed fish tend to be high in the essential amino acid, histidine, as well as the omega-3 fatty acids, eicosapentaenoic acid (EPA) and docosahexaenoic acid (DHA), and are generally said to have health benefits when included in a balanced diet, including such effects as reducing cholesterol.

Almost without exception, blue-backed fish are salt water fish that travel in schools close to the surface of the water, have wide migratory patterns and are relatively low on the food chain so feed on plankton, etc. Their appearance, as is indicated by their name, is a dark blue dorsal with a nearly white under belly. Further, blue-fish are generally fairly small in size and caught in large quantities resulting in low market price, so are thought of as mass-market fish for general consumption and are distinguished from larger, specialty fish caught in smaller quantities, even if they share other qualities.

== Examples ==
Blue-backed fish include:

- Clupeiformes: the order of ray-finned fish that includes Clupeidae (the herring family) and Engraulidae (the anchovy family)
- Beloniformes: the order of ray-finned fish that includes Adrianichthyidae (ricefish and medakas); Belonidae (needlefish); Exocoetidae (flyingfishes); Hemiramphidae (halfbeaks): and the Scomberesocidae (sauries).
- Perciformes: the perch-like order of ray-finned fish comprising over 7000 different species.
