= Solide expedition =

Map of the expedition : 1. Marseille, 2. Cape Verde, 3. Marquesas Islands, 4. Alexander Archipelago, Queen Charlotte Islands, Vancouver Island, 5. Hawaii, 6. Macao, 7. Mauritius

The Solide expedition was the second successful circumnavigation by the French, after that by Bougainville. It occurred from 1790 to 1792 but remains little known due to its mainly commercial aims, in the fur trade between the northwest American coast and China. It was led by the French navigator Étienne Marchand (1755–1793).

== See also ==
- European and American voyages of scientific exploration
