= Jefferson Franklin Moser =

American naval officer

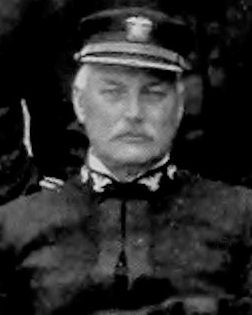
Capt. Moser in 1904

Jefferson Franklin Moser (3 May 1848 – 11 October 1934) was a career officer in the United States Navy. His career spanned the American Civil War and the Spanish–American War. He is noteworthy because he was promoted to the rank of rear admiral twenty years after his retirement from the Navy by a ruling of the Supreme Court of the United States.

== Biography ==
Jefferson Franklin Moser was born in Allentown, Pennsylvania. He was appointed to the United States Naval Academy in September 1864 during the American Civil War. He graduated and was promoted to passed midshipman in June 1868.

In November 1890, Moser was assigned to the newly commissioned protected cruiser USS San Francisco. At that time, San Francisco was commanded by Captain William T. Sampson, who would rise to fame for commanding the fleet operating near Cuba during the Spanish–American War.

In 1893, Moser was assigned as a hydrographic inspector with the United States Coast Survey. He was promoted to lieutenant commander in September 1894 and to commander in May 1899.

=== Command of Albatross ===
On May 19, 1896, Moser was given command of the United States Fish Commission steamer Albatross. Albatross was a San Francisco-based research vessel with a US Navy crew. It was recommissioned in the navy in 1898 for service in the Spanish–American War.

Following repairs and alterations, Albatross sailed from San Francisco on 23 August 1899, bound by a most circuitous route for the Far East. Over the next few months, again with famed marine biologist Alexander Agassiz embarked, she ranged into the South and Central Pacific, visiting the Marquesas, Paumotu, Society Islands, Cook Islands, Tonga, Fiji, Ellice, Gilbert, Marshall Islands, Caroline Islands and the Ladrone Islands. During the course of this cruise over a vast ocean basin, which Alexander Agassiz named "Moser Deep" in honor of Albatross' captain, her distinguished passenger made thousands of dredgings, and soundings of the sea yielded siliceous sponges from 4,173 fathoms. During this voyage Harry Clifford Fassett,[4] captain's clerk and photographer, recorded people, communities and scenes during this voyage using a glass-plate camera.[5]

In January 1902, Moser was given command of the screw steamer USS Pensacola, which had served in the Civil War and was then serving as a training ship at the Yerba Buena Training Station in San Francisco, California.

=== Retirement ===
Moser retired at his own request in September 1904 with the rank of captain. In retirement, he lived in San Francisco.

During World War I Moser was recalled to active duty and served on the staff of the 12th Naval District, which was headquartered at the Mare Island Navy Yard near San Francisco. Moser's active service during World War I made him one of the very few individuals who served on active duty with the United States Armed Forces in the Civil War, Spanish–American War and World War I.

In 1899, Congress passed a new navy retirement law which allowed officers who were veterans of the Civil War to retire in the next higher rank. The navy did not consider Moser's service as a midshipman at the Naval Academy as qualifying service. After years of litigation, the United States Court of Claims ruled that Moser was eligible to retire with the rank of rear admiral. The Navy Department appealed the ruling, and the US Supreme Court decided the case (United States v. Moser, 266 U.S. 236 (1924)) on November 17, 1924, in Moser's favor.

On November 7, 1923, Moser was elected as a Veteran Companion of the District of Columbia Commandery of the Military Order of the Loyal Legion of the United States, a military society of officers who had served in the Union Armed Forces during the American Civil War and their male descendants. He was assigned the Order's insignia number 18353 and was one of the last Civil War Veterans to join the Order. He was also a member of the Grand Army of the Republic and the Society of American Wars.

Moser died in Alameda, California in 1934 at the age of 86.

== Dates of rank ==
- Midshipman - 20 September 1864
- Passed Midshipman - 2 June 1868
- Ensign - 19 April 1869
- Master - 12 July 1870
- Lieutenant - 19 August 1872
- Lieutenant Commander - 16 September 1894
- Commander - 3 March 1899
- Captain - 10 August 1903
- Retired - 29 September 1904
- Rear Admiral on the Retired List - November 17, 1924 (retroactive to 29 September 1904)
