= Carrier DNA =

Inert DNA used to improve the efficiency of nucleic acid precipitation and purification

Carrier DNA is chemically inert, fragmented DNA used in molecular biology during extraction and precipitation procedures to improve the recovery of trace amounts of specific DNA or RNA sequences. It is typically added to a solution containing the target nucleic acid before precipitation. The carrier DNA acts as a co-precipitant, adding bulk to the sample and forming a visible pellet that helps to trap the desired, low-concentration nucleic acid molecules, thus preventing their loss. Since carrier DNA is used as a reagent, it is not intended to be replicated or expressed by a cell.

Carrier DNA applications include the extraction of DNA from forensic samples like hair or trace evidence; the purification of viral DNA or RNA from clinical samples with low viral titers, such as plasma; the isolation of cell-free DNA from blood; and the purification of DNA from laser capture microdissection samples.

== Mechanism of action ==
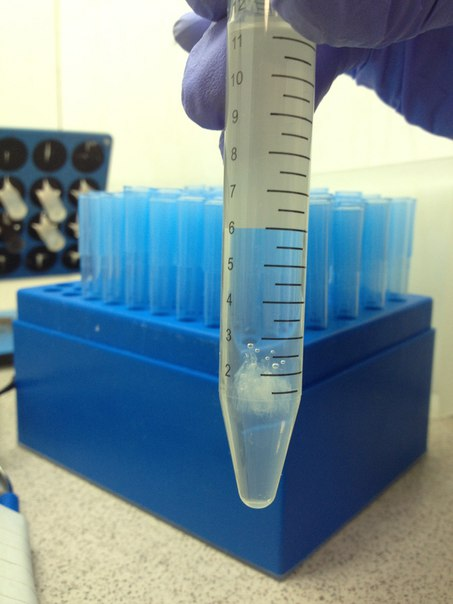
DNA precipitate in 96% ethanol solution.

Carrier DNA functions through several mechanisms to enhance the purification of nucleic acids, especially from dilute solutions or small samples.

=== Co-precipitation ===
The primary function of carrier DNA is to act as a co-precipitant. When alcohol is added to an aqueous solution containing nucleic acids and salt, the nucleic acids lose their hydration shell and aggregate, falling out of solution. If the target nucleic acid is present in very small quantities (picogram or nanogram amounts), it may not form a large enough aggregate to be effectively pelleted by centrifugation. It can also be lost through adherence to the walls of the microfuge tube. Carrier DNA, being present at a much higher concentration (typically 10–20 μg per reaction), precipitates readily and forms a macroscopic lattice that physically traps the smaller amounts of target DNA or RNA, ensuring they form a visible pellet.

=== Surface blocking ===
In methods that use silica membranes or magnetic beads for nucleic acid purification, carrier DNA can prevent the loss of the target sequence by acting as a surface-blocking agent. The high concentration of carrier DNA saturates the non-specific binding sites on the silica or bead surface. This prevents the low-concentration target nucleic acid from binding irreversibly to these sites, thereby maximizing its elution and recovery.

== Considerations ==
Several different types of molecules are used as carriers, with the choice depending on the starting material and the intended downstream applications. Traditionally, sheared herring or salmon sperm DNA is used, as it is inexpensive and effective. This DNA is typically fragmented to reduce its viscosity. However, being a biological source of DNA, it can interfere with enzymatic processes like the polymerase chain reaction (PCR) if primers non-specifically bind to the carrier sequences. Synthetic polynucleotides, such as poly(dA) or poly(dT), offer an alternative with a defined sequence, though they can also interfere with certain applications, like the use of an oligo(dT) primer in reverse transcription.

To avoid any potential for interference, inert, non-nucleic acid polymers are often the preferred choice. Glycogen, derived from oysters, is an effective co-precipitant that does not interfere with spectrophotometric quantification. Another common inert carrier is linear polyacrylamide (LPA), a synthetic polymer that is highly effective and completely inert in most enzymatic reactions, making it suitable for recovering nucleic acids intended for PCR or sequencing. LPA also has the advantage of not precipitating unincorporated nucleotides or very short primers.

== See also ==
- Ethanol precipitation
- DNA extraction
- Molecular cloning
