= Gulf of Maine =

Large gulf of the Atlantic Ocean on the east coast of North America

- French: Golfe du Maine
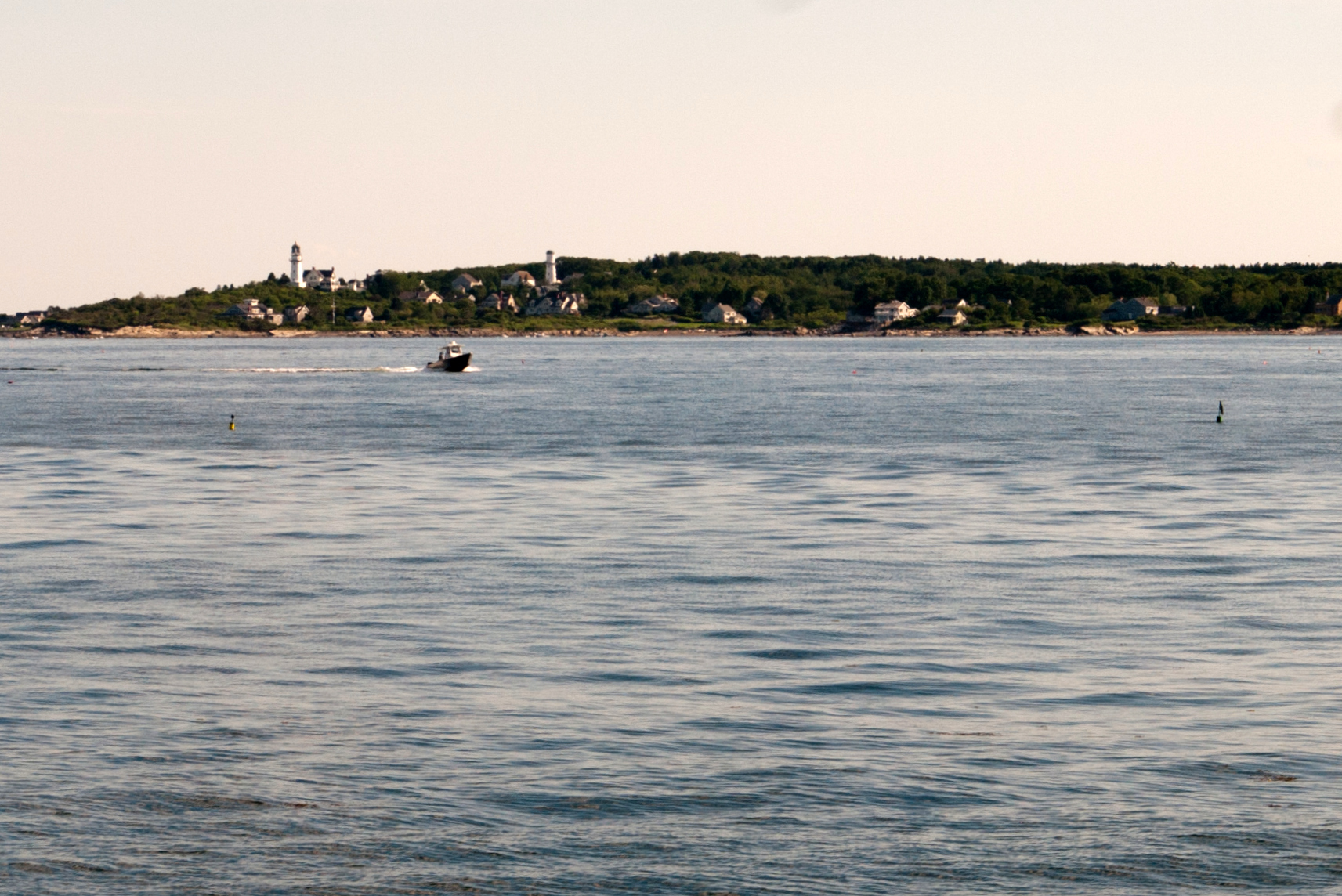
- Gulf of Maine

- Location within North Atlantic

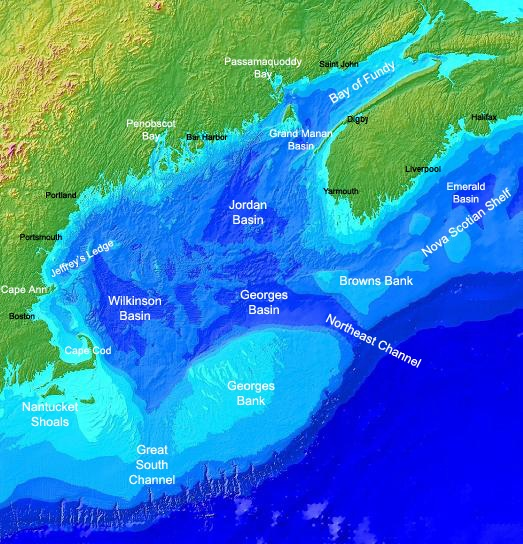
- Major features of the Gulf of Maine
- Location: Northeast coast of the United States and southeast coast of Canada
- Coordinates: 43°N 68°W
- Type: Gulf
- Part of: North Atlantic Ocean
- River sources: Saint John River, Penobscot River
- Catchment area: 69,000 square miles (180,000 km^{2})
- Basin countries: Canada and the United States
- Surface area: 36,000 square miles (93,000 km^{2})
- Islands: Mount Desert Island, Fox Islands (North Haven and Vinalhaven), Isle au Haut, Grand Manan
- Settlements: Boston, Portsmouth, Portland, Saint John

The Gulf of Maine is a large gulf of the Atlantic Ocean on the east coast of North America. It is bounded by Cape Cod at the eastern tip of Massachusetts in the southwest and by Cape Sable Island at the southern tip of Nova Scotia in the northeast. The gulf includes the entire coastlines of the U.S. states of New Hampshire and Maine, as well as Massachusetts north of Cape Cod, and the southern and western coastlines of the Canadian provinces of New Brunswick and Nova Scotia, respectively.

The gulf was named for the adjoining English colonial Province of Maine, which was in turn likely named by early explorers after the province of Maine in France. Massachusetts Bay, Penobscot Bay, Passamaquoddy Bay, and the Bay of Fundy are all arms of the Gulf of Maine.

== Geography and hydrography ==
The Gulf of Maine is a roughly rectangular depression with a surface area of around 36,000 square miles (93,000 km^{2}), enclosed to the west and north by the North American mainland and communicating with the Atlantic Ocean to the southeast. The region's glaciation by the Laurentide Ice Sheet stripped sedimentary soil away from the coastline, leaving a shore that is predominantly rocky and scenic, lacking the sandy beaches found to the south along the Eastern Seaboard. The only significant coastal developments are located in the Boston, Portsmouth, Portland and Saint John metropolitan areas.

The underwater features of the seabed sculpted during the lower sea levels of the ice ages make the gulf a semi-enclosed sea bounded to the south and east by underwater banks. Georges Bank in particular, on its southern end, shelters the gulf from the Gulf Stream. Gulf of Maine waters are more strongly influenced by the Labrador Current, making the gulf waters significantly colder and more nutrient-rich than those found to the south. Undersea valleys in the central basin can reach depths of 1,500 feet (500 m), while undersea mountains rise up 800 feet (240 m) from the sea floor, almost reaching the surface in some locations, or even exceeding it, creating islands.

There are three major basins contained within the Gulf of Maine: Wilkinson Basin to the west, Jordan Basin in the northeast, and Georges Basin in the south, which are isolated from each other beneath the 650-foot (200 m) isobath. Georges Basin, just north of Georges Bank, is the deepest of the three at just over 1,200 feet (370 m) and generates a pocket at the end of the Northeast Channel, a deep fissure between Georges Bank and Browns Bank, the southwestern edge of the Scotian Shelf. The Northeast Channel is the major channel between the Gulf and the rest of the Northwest Atlantic. A secondary, shallower connection to the rest of the Atlantic is the Great South Channel, located between Georges Bank and the Nantucket Shoals.

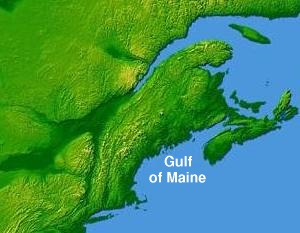
A number of states and provinces along the North American coast drain into the Gulf of Maine. Much of that region is depicted here.

The watershed of the gulf encompasses an area of 69,000 square miles (180,000 km^{2}), including all of Maine, 70% of New Hampshire, 56% of New Brunswick, 41% of Massachusetts, and 36% of Nova Scotia. The watershed also includes a small southern portion of the Canadian province of Quebec, which is less than 1% of the province's area. Significant rivers that drain into the Gulf include, from east to west, the Annapolis, Shubenacadie, Salmon, Petitcodiac, Saint John, Magaguadavic, St. Croix, Penobscot, Kennebec, Saco, Piscataqua, Merrimack and Charles rivers; the Saint John and Penobscot have the greatest discharge.

== Ecology ==
The cold waters, extreme tidal mixing, and diverse bottom of the gulf make it one of the most productive marine environments in the North Atlantic, and it furnishes habitat for more than 3,000 marine species and birds, including most notably large marine species such as haddock, pinnipeds, the Acadian redfish (Sebastes fasciatus), the Atlantic herring (Clupea harengus), and the American lobster (Homarus americanus), which grows to famously large sizes in the gulf. The biodiversity and productivity of the area are supported by kelp forest habitats that are found along the coastal zones of the gulf.

In the Gulf of Maine, different kelp macroalgae species are found at various depths. At depths less than 5 meters, Alaria esculenta is most abundant, while the Saccharina species such as S. latissima and S. digita are the species primarily seen at depths of 5–15 meters. In the deeper waters, Agarum clathratum are more abundant in the rocky subtidal zone.

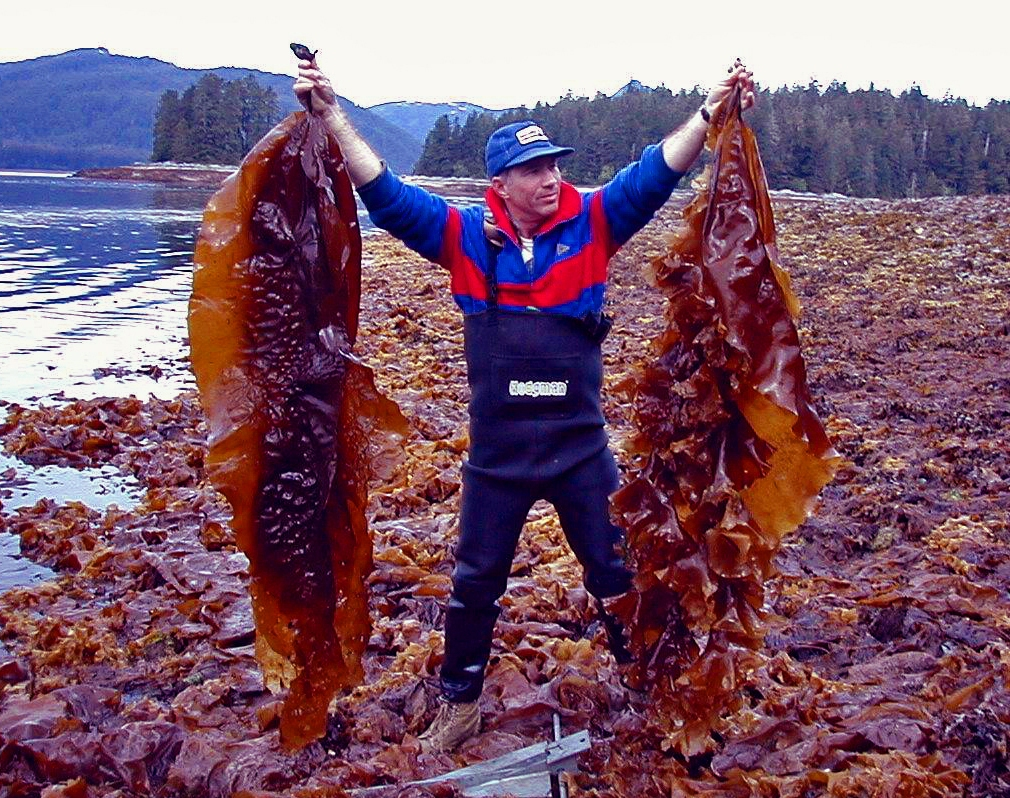
S. latissima, one of the most abundant of the Saccharina species in the Gulf of Maine

The waters of the Gulf of Maine system, particularly at the boundary with the Bay of Fundy, are also home to the summering grounds for many different bird and whale species, most notably the highly endangered North Atlantic right whale. The gulf was home to the sea mink until its extinction in the late 1800s.

Water temperatures in the Gulf of Maine are rapidly rising due to human-induced climate change. Both the Labrador Current and Gulf Stream are warming, and the Gulf Stream is spreading out and delivering more water to the Gulf of Maine. As a result, it has become too warm for cod as well as kelp forests. Studies found that some areas, such as Ammen Rock Site 1, witnessed a 36.2% decrease in kelp between 1987 and 2015, while nearby shallow coastal kelp populations have been declining since the 1970s. Alongside this decline, the kelp beds have been replaced by invasive turf, defined as macroalgae that provide little three-dimensional structure but form on the bottom layers as filaments, branches, or plumes. In southwestern areas, turf is now covering 50–60% of the ocean floor. This, along with past overfishing, has helped push stocks towards collapse and hampered its recovery despite deep reductions in the number of fish caught, according to a study conducted by the Gulf of Maine Research Institute. Traditional calculations "consistently over-estimated the abundance of cod." From 2004, temperatures rose by more than 0.4 °F (0.22 °C) per year, culminating in an ocean heat wave in the northwest Atlantic in 2012–13.

Starting in the early 1990's, to prevent further degradation of the ecosystem, a number of closed areas have been created in which certain activities are banned for some or all parts of the year.

== History and political significance ==
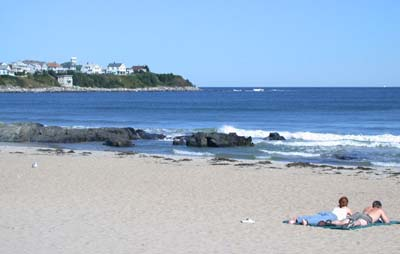
Hampton Beach, New Hampshire, in mid-September 2004

The gulf's relative proximity to Europe compared to other locations on the opposite side of the Atlantic made it an early destination for European colonization. French settlers founded a settlement on St. Croix Island in 1604. English settlers founded the Popham Colony on an island in the Kennebec River in 1607, the same year as the Jamestown settlement, followed by the Plymouth Colony on the shores of Massachusetts Bay in 1620. The cod fisheries that flourished in this ecosystem were able to support the Industrial Revolution occurring in Europe as well as playing a role during the 17th through early 19th century's trade routes between Africa, the Caribbean, North America and Europe.

In the 1960s and 1970s, there was a dispute between Canada and the United States over fishing and other resource rights in the Gulf of Maine, specifically in the Georges Bank region. This dispute was taken to the International Court of Justice, which delineated a maritime boundary through the gulf in 1984. The two nations continue to disagree on the sovereignty of Machias Seal Island and the waters surrounding it in the northeastern part of the gulf. In recognition of the gulf's importance to marine habitat, both nations currently maintain complementary embargoes against offshore oil and gas exploration activities on Georges Bank in the southern part of the gulf.

As of the past twenty years, however, traditional maritime fisheries focused on large fish species such as cod experienced a stock depletion that hurt commercial fishing. In response, harvesting of lobsters and other invertebrates rose. These changes can largely be attributed to anthropogenic factors. There has also been a rise in marine aquaculture in the area, following global trends. Such aquaculture species include Atlantic salmon, oysters, clams, mussels, and more.

== See also ==
- British colonization of the Americas
- French colonization of the Americas
- Gulf of Maine Research Institute
- Maritime Peninsula
