= Kelp noodles =

Noodles made from kelp extract

- Alternative names: Cheon Sa Chae, Angel threads, Angel noodles
- Type: Noodles
- Region or state: East Asia
- Main ingredients: Alginic acid from kelp
- Food energy (per 4 ounces (110 g) serving): 6
Nutritional value
(per 4 ounces (110 g) serving)
- Protein: 0 g
- Fat: 0 g
- Carbohydrate: 1 g

Kelp noodles or cheon sa chae (Korean: 천사채), are semi-transparent noodles made from the jelly-like extract left after steaming edible kelp. They are made without the addition of grain flour or starch. Kelp noodles have a crunchy texture and are low in calories. They can be eaten raw, in salads, but for added taste, some prefer to cook them in water with spices added for flavoring. Many restaurants serve kelp noodles in stir fry dishes. The noodles usually require rinsing before being added to a stir-fry dish towards the end of cooking time.

== Nutrition ==
Along with their low caloric content, kelp noodles also contain minimal nutrients.

== Dishes ==
Kelp noodles are mostly prepared in various Asian cuisines as a low-carbohydrate substitute for rice and pasta. They are commonly used in soups, salads, stir-fries, and vegetable side dishes. Since they have a neutral taste, they take on the flavors of the dishes to which they are added. The noodles can be purchased online or in health food supermarkets, and restaurants are beginning to offer kelp noodles as an alternative to more traditional noodles or rice in their dishes.

== Potential economic impact ==
The popularity of kelp noodles among health-conscious consumers is growing because of the rising demand for gluten-free food products.
