= Suguo =

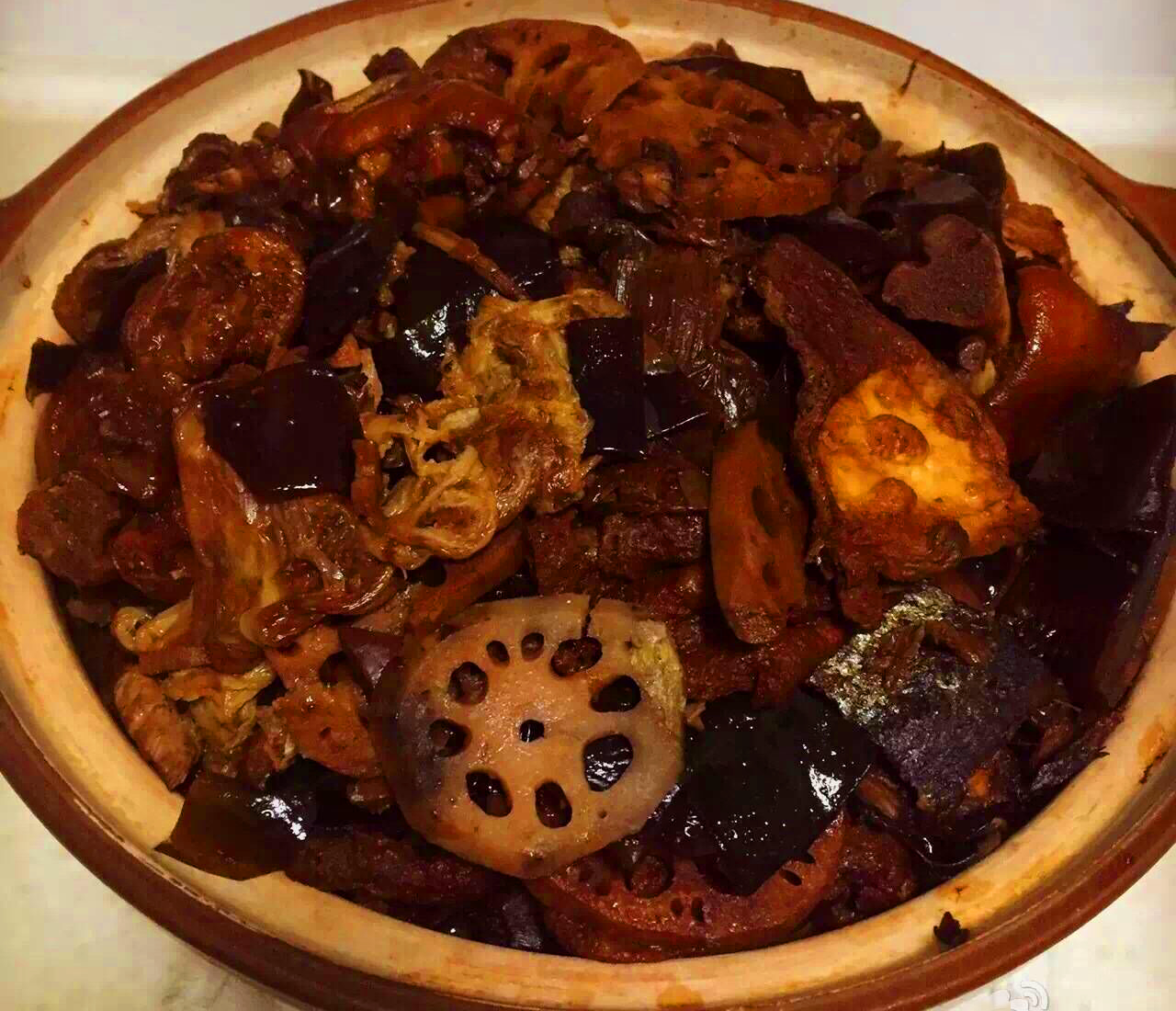

Suguo (simplified Chinese: 酥锅; traditional Chinese: 酥鍋) is a traditional dish in Zibo, Shandong province for the Spring Festival (Chinese New Year). The inventor Su Xiaomei is the younger sister of Su Shi-a famous poet in the Song dynasty.

== Cooking method and nutritional value ==
The dish can be cooked using pork, Saccharina japonica, lotus root, tofu and so on.
