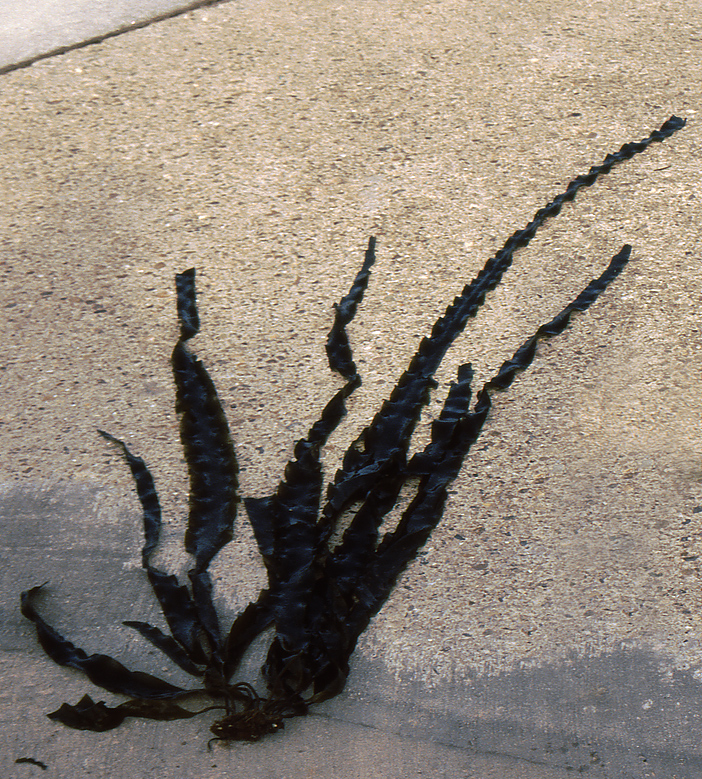
- Saccharina latissima

Scientific classification
- Domain: Eukaryota
- Clade: Sar
- Clade: Stramenopiles
- Phylum: Ochrophyta
- Class: Phaeophyceae
- Order: Laminariales
- Family: Laminariaceae
- Genus: Saccharina; Stackh.

Type species
- Saccharina plana Stackh. = Saccharina latissima (L.) C.E. Lane et al.

Species
- 24 species; see text

= Saccharina =

Genus of seaweeds

Saccharina is a genus of 24 species of Phaeophyceae (brown algae). It is found in the north Atlantic Ocean and the northern Pacific Ocean at depths from 8 m to 30 m (exceptionally to 120 m in the warmer waters of the Mediterranean Sea and off Brazil).

The commercially important species Saccharina japonica (Laminaria japonica) is cultivated as kombu, a popular food in Japan.

== Species ==
The following is a list of the 24 species of Saccharina:

- Saccharina angustata (Kjellman) C.E. Lane, C. Mayes, Druehl & G.W. Saunders
- Saccharina angustissima (Collins) Augyte, Yarish & Neefus
- Saccharina bongardiana (Postels & Ruprecht) Selivanova, Zhigadlova & G.I. Hansen
- Saccharina cichorioides (Miyabe) C.E. Lane, C. Mayes, Druehl & G.W. Saunders
- Saccharina coriacea (Miyabe) C.E. Lane, C. Mayes, Druehl & G.W. Saunders
- Saccharina complanata (Setchell & N.L.Gardner) Gabrielson, Lindstrom & O'Kelly
- Saccharina crassifolia (Postels & Ruprecht) Kuntze
- Saccharina dentigera (Kjellman) C.E. Lane, C. Mayes, Druehl & G.W. Saunders
- Saccharina groenlandica (Rosenvinge) C.E. Lane, C. Mayes, Druehl & G.W. Saunders
- Saccharina gurjanovae (A.D. Zinova) Selivanova, Zhigadlova & G.I. Hansen
- Saccharina gyrata (Kjellman) C.E. Lane, C. Mayes, Druehl & G.W. Saunders
- Saccharina japonica (J.E. Areschoug) C.E. Lane, C. Mayes, Druehl & G.W. Saunders
- Saccharina kurilensis C.E. Lane, C. Mayes, Druehl & G.W. Saunders
- Saccharina lanciformis (Petrov) N.G.Klockova & Beliyi
- Saccharina latissima (Linnaeus) C.E. Lane, C. Mayes, Druehl & G.W. Saunders
- Saccharina longicruris (Bachelot de la Pylaie) Kuntze
- Saccharina longipedales (Okamura) C.E. Lane, C. Maves, Druehl & G.W. Saunders
- Saccharina longissima (Miyabe) C.E. Lane, C. Mayes, Druehl & G.W. Saunders
- Saccharina ochotensis (Miyabe) C.E. Lane, C. Mayes, Druehl & G.W. Saunders
- Saccharina religiosa (Miyabe) C.E. Lane, C. Mayes, Druehl & G.W. Saunders
- Saccharina sachalinensis (Miyabe) N.Yotsukura & L.D.Druehl
- Saccharina sculpera (Miyabe) C.E. Lane, C. Mayes, Druehl & G.W. Saunders
- Saccharina sessilis (C. Agardh) Kuntze
- Saccharina yendoana (Miyabe) C.E. Lane, C. Mayes, Druehl & G.W. Saunders
