= Korean temple cuisine =

Korean Buddhist cuisine

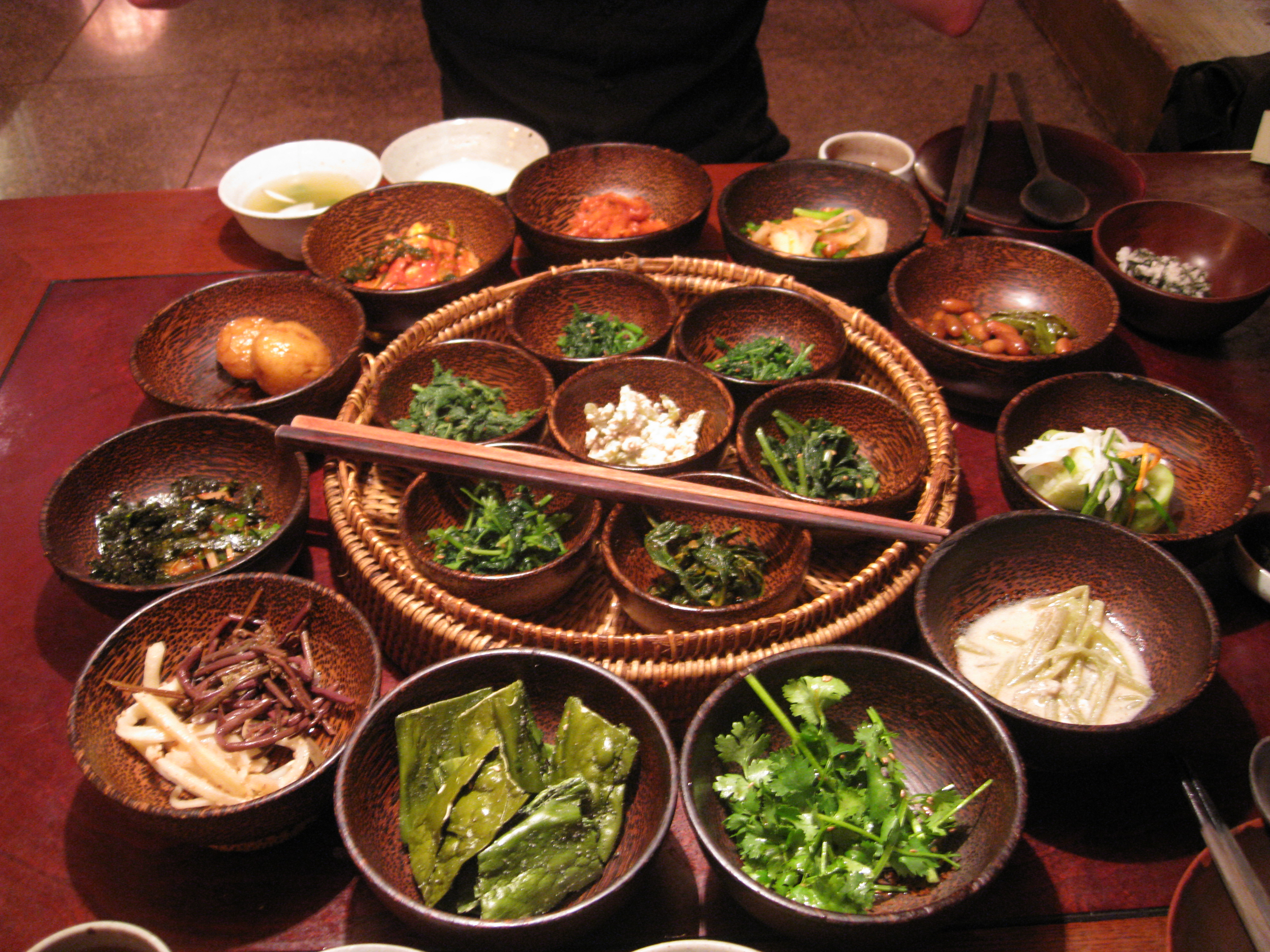
- Korean temple cuisine at Sanchon, a restaurant located in Insadong, Seoul.

Korean name
- Hangul: 사찰음식
- Hanja: 寺刹飮食
- RR: sachal eumsik
- MR: sach'al ŭmsik

Korean temple cuisine (Korean: 사찰음식) refers to a type of cuisine that originated in Buddhist temples of Korea. Since Buddhism was introduced into Korea, Buddhist traditions have strongly influenced Korean cuisine as well. During the Silla period (57 BC – 935 AD), chalbap (찰밥, a bowl of cooked glutinous rice) yakgwa (약과, a fried dessert) and yumilgwa (a fried and puffed rice snack) were served for Buddhist altars and have been developed into types of hangwa, Korean traditional confectionery. During the Goryeo period, sangchu ssam (wraps made with lettuce), yaksik, and yakgwa were developed, so spread to China and other countries. Since the Joseon Dynasty, Buddhist cuisine has been established in Korea according to regions and temples.

On the other hand, royal court cuisine is closely related to Korean temple cuisine. In the past, when the royal court maids called sanggung, who were assigned to Suragan (수라간; 水剌間; the name of the royal kitchen), where they prepared the king's meals, became old, they had to leave the royal palace. Therefore, many of them entered Buddhist temples to become nuns. As the result, culinary techniques and recipes of the royal cuisine were integrated into Buddhist cuisine.

== Dishes by region ==
Baek kimchi (white kimchi) to which pine nuts have been added, bossam kimchi (보쌈김치), and gosu kimchi (고수김치, coriander kimchi) are famous in Buddhist temples of Gyeonggi and Chungcheong Province. In Jeolla Province, godeulppagi kimchi (고들빼기김치, kimchi made with Youngia sonchifolia), gat kimchi (갓김치, kimchi made with Brassica juncea var. integrifolia), and juksun kimchi (죽순김치, bamboo shoot kimchi), all of which include deulkkaejuk (perilla congee) as an ingredient, are famous. None of these varieties of kimchi contain garlic, scallions, or jeotgal (salted fermented seafood), as foods in the genus Allium are generally avoided by traditional Buddhist monks and nuns of China, Korea, Vietnam, Japan, and India.

== Dishes by temple ==
Tongdosa located in Yangsan, South Gyeongsang Province is known for its dureup muchim (두릅무침, sauteed shoots of Aralia elata), pyeogobap (표고밥, shiitake rice), nokdu chalpyeon (녹두찰편, steamed tteok, a rice cake made with mung beans) are well-known dishes as well as kimchi, saengchae (생채, cold salad), twigak (튀각, a fried dish with without coating), and jeon (pancake) made with young shoots of Toona sinensis. The species is called chamjuk, literally meaning "true bamboo" in Korean because its shoots can be eaten like bamboo shoots. However, the dishes are prefixed with either chanmjuk or "gajuk" (가죽; lit. 'false bamboo') according to region.

Haeinsa, located in Hapcheon, South Gyeongsang Province, is not only famous for the Tripitaka Koreana but also specialty of the temple cuisine such as sangchu bulttuk kimchi (상추불뚝김치, lettuce kimchi), gaji jijim (가지지짐, pan-fried sliced eggplant), gosu muchim (고수무침, sauteed coriander leaves), sandongbaekip bugak (산동백잎부각, fried leaves of Lindera obtusiloba), meouitang (머위탕 Petasites japonicus soup), songibap (송이밥, rice dish made with matsutake), solipcha (솔잎차, tea made with leaves of Pinus densiflora).

== See also ==
- Buddhist cuisine
- Jeong Kwan, Buddhist nun and temple cuisine chef
- Korean Buddhism
- Korean cuisine
- List of Buddhist temples in South Korea
- Templestay

== Bibliography ==
- "Significance of Temple Food". Korea Temple. Archived from the original on 2007-03-15.
- "History of Temple Food". Korea Temple. Archived from the original on 2007-03-15.
- Kim Yeon-sik (김연식) (1999). 한국사찰음식 (in Korean). Uri Publishing (우리출판사). ISBN 89-7561-086-1.
- Seonjae (2005-05-25). Kim Su-kyeong (김수경) (ed.). 선재 스님의 사찰음식 (in Korean). Design House. ISBN 89-7041-917-9.
- Seono (2008-04-21). 선오 스님의 백련으로 만드는 사찰음식 (in Korean). Unjusa (운주사). ISBN 978-89-5746-208-9.
- Jeokmun (적문) (2000-06-01). 전통 사찰음식 (in Korean). Uri Publishing (우리출판사). ISBN 89-7561-128-0.
- 사찰음식. Cultural Institute of Traditional Food. Archived from the original on 2007-08-06.
- Seungsook Moon. "Buddhist Temple Food in South Korea". Winter. 2008. Korea Journal. Archived from the original on 2011-06-14.
