= Korean Food Promotion Institution =

Korean Food Promotion Institute
- Formation: 2010
- Type: Not-for-profit
- Legal status: Active
- Purpose: Improve on the quality life of people and development of the national economy by globalized the Korean cuisine
- Headquarters: Korea
- Location: aT Center, room 601, Yangjae-dong 232, Seoch-gu, Seoul, Republic of Korea
- Region served: Worldwide
- Official language: English and Korean
- Website: www.hansik.or.kr

The Korean Food Promotion Institution (Korean: 한식진흥원) or previously Korean Food Foundation (한식재단) is a nonprofit organization established in March 2010 to enhance the overall well-being of Korean people and the economic status of South Korea by promoting Korean cuisine globally. It aspires to improve competitiveness within the Korean food industries locally and overseas. The organization was established as a public domain with the support of the Ministry of Agriculture, Food and Rural Affairs. The organization has put in efforts to draw publicity and globalize its brand; it has partnerships with several countries to promote Korean cuisine.

== History ==
In 2009 the Korean Food Foundation Establishment Preparation Committee and Korean Food Globalization Task Force were established. The Korean Food Foundation was established in 2010, with Jeong Wun-cheon selected as its first president. In 2011 Yang Il-sun became the next president and a website with the aim of marketing Korean cuisine around the world was officially launched.

In 2012 the organization received an award from WEBAWARD KOREA. It was also appointed by Ministry for Food, Agriculture, Forestry and Fisheries to take the initiatives of the "Korean Food Globalization" and it supervises the project which involves training related to Korean food from aT

In 2013 the organization took over "Korean culinary school support project" and "Overseas Korean restaurant support project" from aT. In 2014 Kang Min-su became the third president of the organization

In 2015 it is appointed as the organization the runs on the public domain. In 2016 Yun Suk-ja became the foundation's fourth president. The Korean Food Cultural Center has been established to promote the Korean cuisine industry around the world and the culinary tourism. In 2017 the Korean Food Foundation was renamed to Korean Food Promotion Institution and tasked with the "Overseas Korean restaurant consulting project".

In August 2021, Yim Kyeong-sook was appointed by the Ministry of Agriculture, Food and Rural Affairs as the sixth president of the Korean Food Promotion Institute. She replaces Seonjae who was inaugurated in April 2018.

== Activities ==
Korean Food Promotion Institution is involved in efficiently marketing and advertising its brand in different regions of the world, as well as to keep the origin of Korean cuisine. The R&D was one of the ways that the organization used to modify as well as to keep the origin of Korean cuisine. The organization collaborates with various entities to improve Korean restaurants around the world.

Its vision is to be the organization that brings the values to Korean cuisine in the anticipated periods.

=== Purpose of establishment ===
There are three roles that the Korean Food Promotion Institution focuses on. The first one was the official authority for the establishment of Korean cuisine. It involved with the careful examination of the historical aspects of Korean food as well as its culture in a different timeline. The database system was one of the methods which the original form of Korean cuisine stored in it. Various history documents can be used to trace back to the origin of Korean food. The organization has worked to redevelop its Korean Cuisine through modification in order to comply with the modern eating style of the people. The second one was the advertising of Korean cuisine. It involved careful investigation and development of the ways that the Korean cuisine was cooked as well as reaching a consensus of how the ingredients were to be kept and stored. Also, the researches would investigate of the ingredients used in the cooking of Korean cuisine to improve the overall taste of Korean cuisine. The last point was to advertise Korean cuisine all over the world with the redevelopment of Korean cuisine. It involves advertising through different channels as well as an official network for contributing of the information to the Korean restaurant located overseas.

=== The primary role of the organization ===
- The overall foundation of Korean cuisine
  - Development of the system with the statistical data of the Korean food
  - Investigate Korean food in the globalized context
  - Development of database system that stores the information of the Korean food
  - To make significant advancement on the usability of the information of the Korean food
- Improve the overall position of the Korean restaurants in the restaurant industry
  - Management of "Korean restaurants consulting group" in foreign countries
  - The exportation of food ingredients
  - "private group support system."
- Talent sourcing
  - Provision of jobs as well as training for specialists
  - Offer help to the institution that focuses on Korean food
- Globalization of the Korean cuisine
  - Development of the advertising system online
  - Promoting "Korean food cultural center model."
  - "Industrialization of culinary tourism."

== Achievements ==
2010–2011

- With the objectives of increasing the publicity of Korean cuisine in Japan, the organization has signed an agreement with the Japanese Hattori Academy.
- On G-20 Summit, the organization has advertised the Korean cuisine
- Several sponsorships for significant international events and television shows - Cooking competition in the event of experience the difference in culture between China and Korea as well as a television show "Delicious Korea"
- A TV program section - "The Globalization of Korean Food" was produced by the organization
- The guidebooks were issued across the five foreign countries (Denmark, the Netherlands, Switzerland, Austria, and Belgium)

2012–2013

- Issued guidebooks of 'specifically selected Korean restaurants' in foreign editions (Western Europe and Tokyo)
- “The Ministry of Agriculture, Food, and Rural Affairs” has appointed the organization to be in charge of Korean food globalization
- Issued the 2012 Korean food menu guidebooks that share Korean food in a variety of languages
- Published 'the Hidden Taste: Tradition North Korean Food'
- The newsletters of "global Korean Food" were published and the number of publications totalled 24

2014–2015

- Issued a guidebook and a mobile app that tells people of the recommended Korean restaurants in China (Beijing, Qingdao, and Shanghai)
- Developed an online platform for all the Korean restaurants located in overseas
- Issued a guidebook of the highly recommended Korean restaurants and a mobile app in Southeast Asia (Vietnam, Thailand, Malaysia, and Indonesia)
- An agreement with regards to the Korean cuisine was signed with "private organization" and "Korean Food Forum"
- The organization has produced a TV show aired in Vietnam at the VTV3

Documentary featured on Arirang TV

2016–2017

- The organization has published the guidebook that features the Korean restaurants with HALAL
- Guidebooks of recommended Korean restaurants were published in Hong Kong and Singapore
- A presentation was taken for the introduction of the ten popular menus of the Korean restaurants
- A documentary explicitly produced for Korean cuisine on Arirang TV

== Globalization of Korean Food Promotion Institute ==
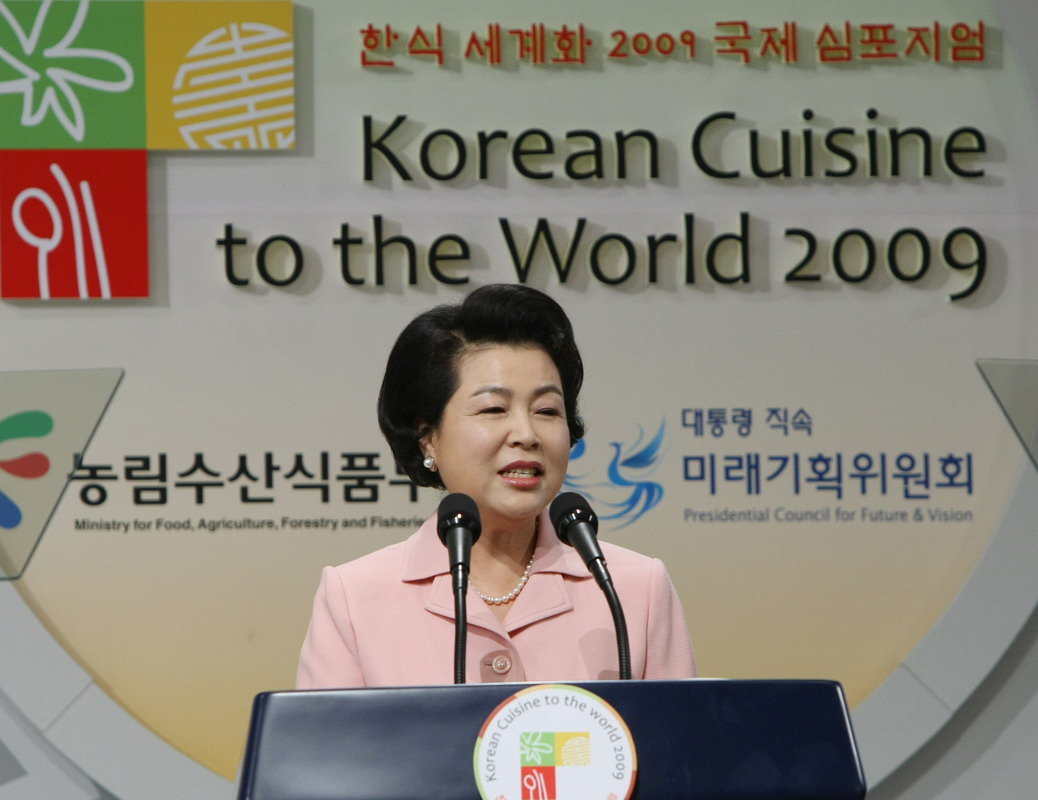
First Lady of South Korea Kim Yoon-ok giving a speech at the "Korean Cuisine to the World" symposium in 2009

The goal of globalization is to allow people around the world to have a taste of Korean cuisine and to make an improvement. By broadening the Korean food industries in local and overseas would enhance the different industries on the aspect of the business, such as food, tourism, and farming. These enhancements would show the excellence of Korea by globalizing its cuisine around the world.

=== Branding ===
For the Korean Food brand, it has shown appreciation for the people and the environment, and there is a connection between them. The definition behind its brand is that there is a strong relationship between the people as well as the natural environment, and they would live together in peace. Additionally, the Korean Food brand allows the building of the "business models", the instruction for different ways of communication, and a continued following of the goal of the Korean Food Brand would boost the value of its brand.

The logo of the Korean Food Foundation has shown two aspects of the meanings. Firstly, it represents the harmony of the people and the natural environment and secondly, the "trigrams: geon, gon gam and ri” shows spirits of keeping up with the time. The trigrams also denote "air, water, earth, and fire," and it has shown a representation of the harmony environment in Korea. The meaning behind the trigrams also represent characteristics of Korean cuisine.

The colors used in the Korean Food Foundation's logo represent different ingredients associated with Korean cuisine and the natural environment. The design incorporates traditional Korean colors to reflect the relationship between food, culture, and nature.

=== Planning ===
Many Korean restaurants hope to expand overseas to publicize Korean food. The opportunities for broadening its business around the world is the only way for agricultural and fishing industries to prosper and to efficiently operate. With the healthy ingredients used in Korean cuisine, it has gained an increasing acceptance from the people in foreign countries as well as the global market. Those ingredients for making the Korean food are usually shipped to the East Asian markets, and the reason is that the people in the East Asian countries have the same taste of the food as well as the personal backgrounds which allows the convenient and effective marketing of the Korean food. Those entrepreneurs based in Korean are searching for the global market that ranges from Asian regions to the Eastern regions. The Korean government would collaborate with privately held companies to explore as many global markets as possible, and the international food exhibition gives those Korean companies opportunities to introduce their unique food products. In the exportation process, the Korean government also take part in the overall packaging of Korean food products to meet the standards of the customs clearing process.

The Korean government collaborates with Korean trading companies as well as those privately listed companies with the aim of increasing exportation of Korean food products. Nowadays, many overseas markets have little focus on traditional Korean food products and therefore, extensive advertising is required. However, some Korean food corporations are not able to achieve it. To enter the global market, those corporations have to understand Korea and its food products. The only efficient way to publicise Korean cuisine worldwide is to make enhancements to the food products and ensure the quality of the food meets the specific standard.

=== Korean cuisine globalization activities ===
==== Korean restaurant in New York ====
It was reported that a well-known chef who has won the contestant two times and he had opened a Korean restaurant in New York with a partnership of Korean food foundation. The reason behind it was that he wanted more people living in America to appreciate Korean cuisine. This event credits the Korean Food Foundation as well as its "parent organisation" for the effort in advertising Korean cuisine in a foreign country.

==== Free Korean Lunch Sweepstakes ====
Korean food foundation gave out over 1600 free lunches to the people who participated in online sweepstakes and involved in the program against hunger. Every person who participated in the program would voluntarily donate $1.00 for the campaign with the aim of fighting against hunger. Through the program, the organization hopes to promote Korean cuisine as a healthy substitute for the food people in New York eat every day.

==== Participation in the New York Wine and Food Festival ====
The Korean Food Foundation has participated in the "New York Wine and Food Festival" with the objective of the fight against poverty and hunger and globalizes Korean food in a foreign country. In this event, it demonstrated the "art of fermentation" in South Korea to bring more attention to the problems of hunger and poverty. The Korean food industry has gained a global reputation as the government-funded projects "Hansik Globalization" boost the overall development of Korean cuisine. By participating in the event, the Korean Food Foundation increased its public exposure, and the revenue of the Korean restaurant in New York City has increased significantly.
