= Sunjae =

South Korean Buddhist nun and chef (born 1956)

Sunjae (Korean: 선재; born 1956) is a Jogye Order Buddhist nun and chef of Korean cuisine. Sunjae, who is known as Korea's "first master of temple cuisine", promotes Korean cuisine internationally. She appeared on numerous television programs, including as a competitor on the second season of Culinary Class Wars.

== Early life and education ==
Sunjae was born in Suwon, the capital of Gyeonggi Province, in 1956. Raised as an Anglican, she converted to Buddhism at 18 after hearing a monk speak at a temple. After working as a civil servant for several years, she left home in 1980 to join the Sinheungsa temple and to focus on temple cuisine. She was ordained as a nun in 1981.

In 1994 Sunjae earned a bachelors degree from the Buddhist Joong-ang Sangha University with a thesis entitled "A Cultural Review of Temple Food".

== Career ==
She is known professionally as Sunjae Sunim, often translated as Venerable Sunjae (or Seonjae). As a writer, she has adopted the pen name "Mayul", meaning "to become the basis".

Sunjae describes food as medicine, and credits her temple diet for curing her liver cirrhosis.

In 2018 she was selected to lead the Korean Food Promotion Institution, and she travels around the world speaking about Korean cuisine. Sunjae emphasizes similarities between Buddhist food traditions and Europe's Slow Food movement. She stepped down from the institution in 2021.

In 2025–2026 she appeared as a "white spoon" in the second season of the Netflix cooking competition, Culinary Class Wars. In 2026 she also appeared in The Chefs of the Temple Kitchen, which streamed on Wavve.

== Works ==
- Venerable Sunjae's Temple Food (Korean: 선재 스님의 사찰음식), 2005, ISBN 9788970419176
- Temple Cuisine Seasoned with the Stories of Venerable Sunjae (Korean: 선재 스님의 이야기로 버무린 사찰음식), 2011, ISBN 9788974795962
- What Do You Eat to Live? (Korean: 당신은 무엇을 먹고 사십니까), 2016, ISBN 9788974793357
