= Bugak =

Deep-fried Korean vegetable snack

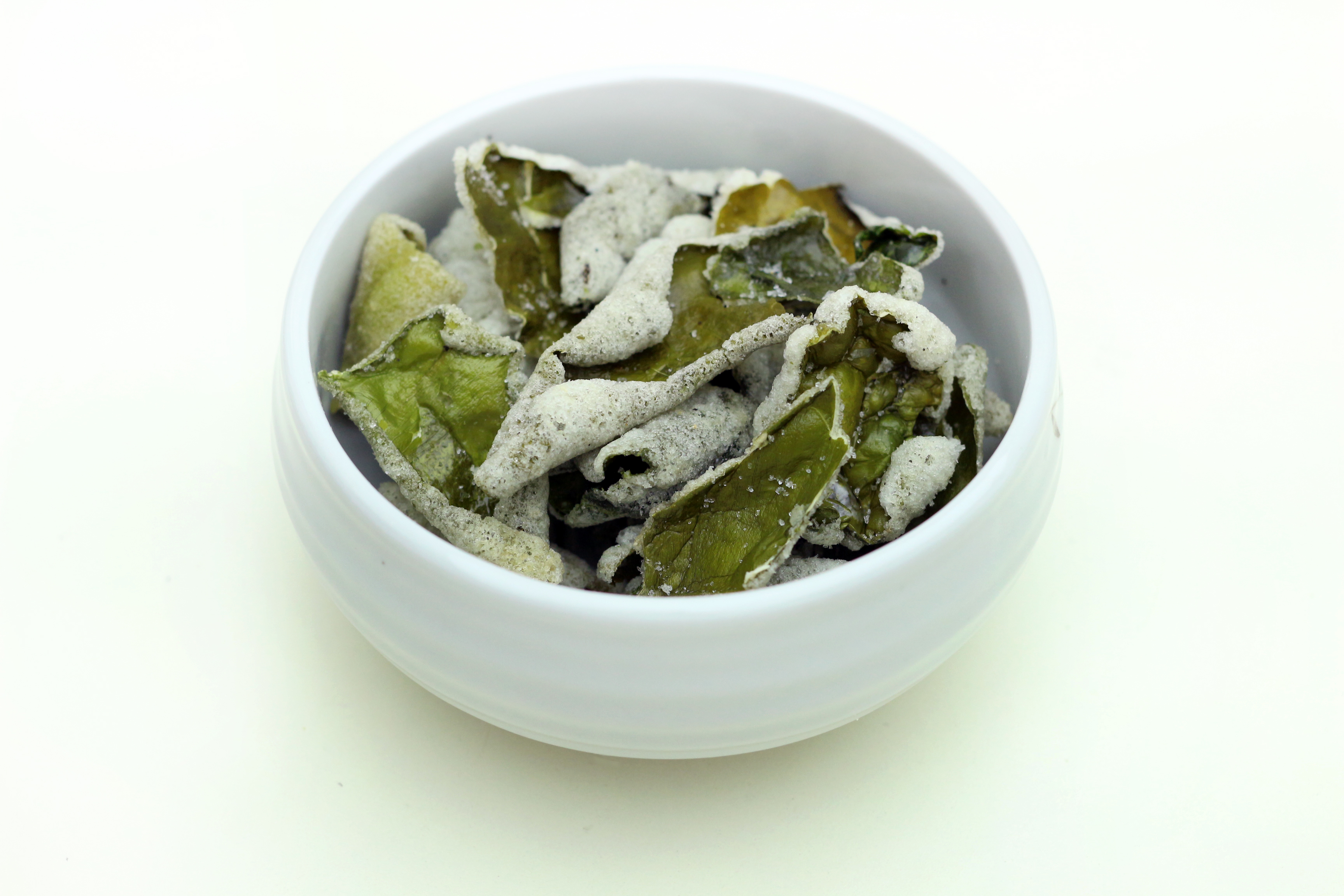
- Dasima-bugak (deep-fried kelp)
- Type: Fritter
- Place of origin: Korea
- Associated cuisine: Korean cuisine

Korean name
- Hangul: 부각
- RR: bugak
- MR: pugak
- IPA: pu.ɡak̚

Bugak (부각) is a variety of vegetarian twigim (deep-fried dish) in Korean cuisine. It is made by deep frying dried vegetables or seaweed coated with chapssal-pul (찹쌀풀; glutinous rice paste) and then drying them again. It is eaten as banchan (accompaniment to cooked rice) or anju (accompaniment to alcoholic beverages). Common ingredients are green chili peppers, perilla leaves, perilla inflorescence, camellia leaves, chrysanthemum leaves, burdock leaves, tree of heaven shoots, potatoes, gim (laver), and dasima (kelp). Vegetable oils such as perilla oil or soybean oil are typically used for frying.

Bugak is a relatively rare culinary technique in Korean cuisine, along with dasima twigak (튀각; deep fried vegetables without coating). It is often associated with Korean temple cuisine.

== Varieties ==
- dangeun-bugak (당근부각) – made with carrots
- dasima-bugak (다시마부각) – made with kelp
- deulkkae-songi-bugak (들깨송이부각) – made with perilla inflorescence
- dongbaek-ip-bugak (동백잎부각) – made with camellia leaves
- dureup-bugak (두릅부각) – made with angelica tree shoots
- eumnamu-sun-bugak (음나무순부각) – made with castor aralia shoots
- gajuk-bugak (가죽부각) – made with tree of heaven shoots
- gamja-bugak (감자부각) – made with potatoes
- gamnnip-bugak (감잎부각) – made with persimmon leaves
- gim-bugak (김부각) – made with laver
- gochu-bugak (고추부각) – made with green chili peppers
- gukhwa-ip-bugak (국화잎부각) – made with chrysanthemum leaves
- kkaennip-bugak (깻잎부각) – made with perilla leaves
- mosi-ip-bugak (모시잎부각) – made with ramie leaves
- ogapi-ip-bugak (오가피잎부각) – made with eleuthero leaves
- parae-bugak (파래부각) – made with green laver
- ssuk-bugak (쑥부각) – made with Korean mugwort
- ueong-ip-bugak (우엉잎부각) – made with burdock

== Gallery ==
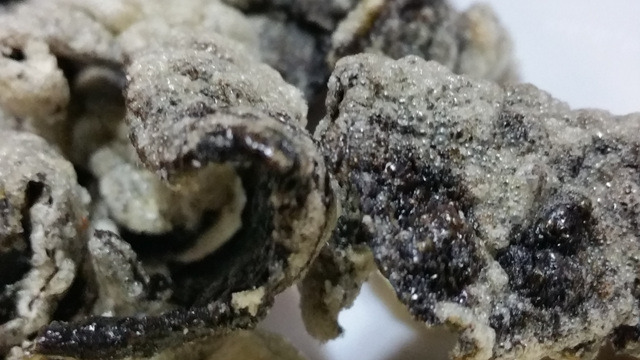
Gim-bugak (deep fried seaweed)

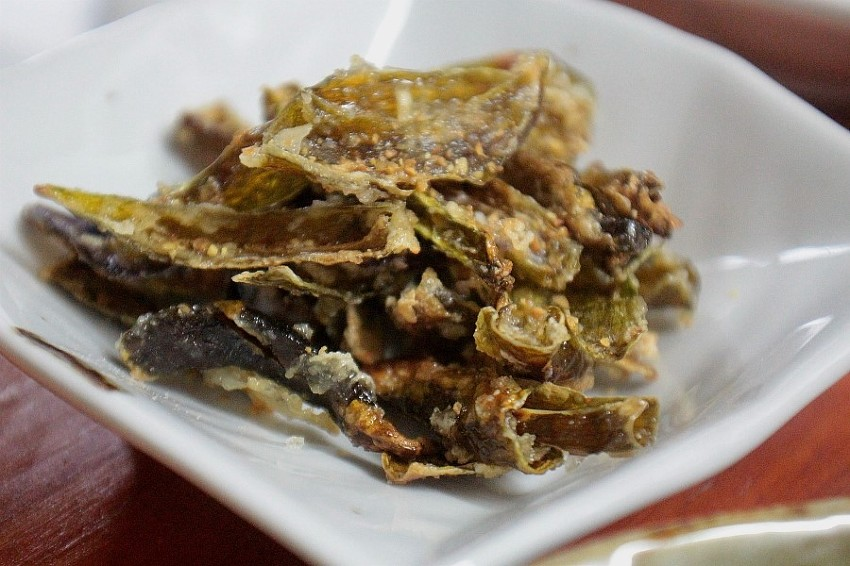
Gochu-bugak (deep fried chili peppers)

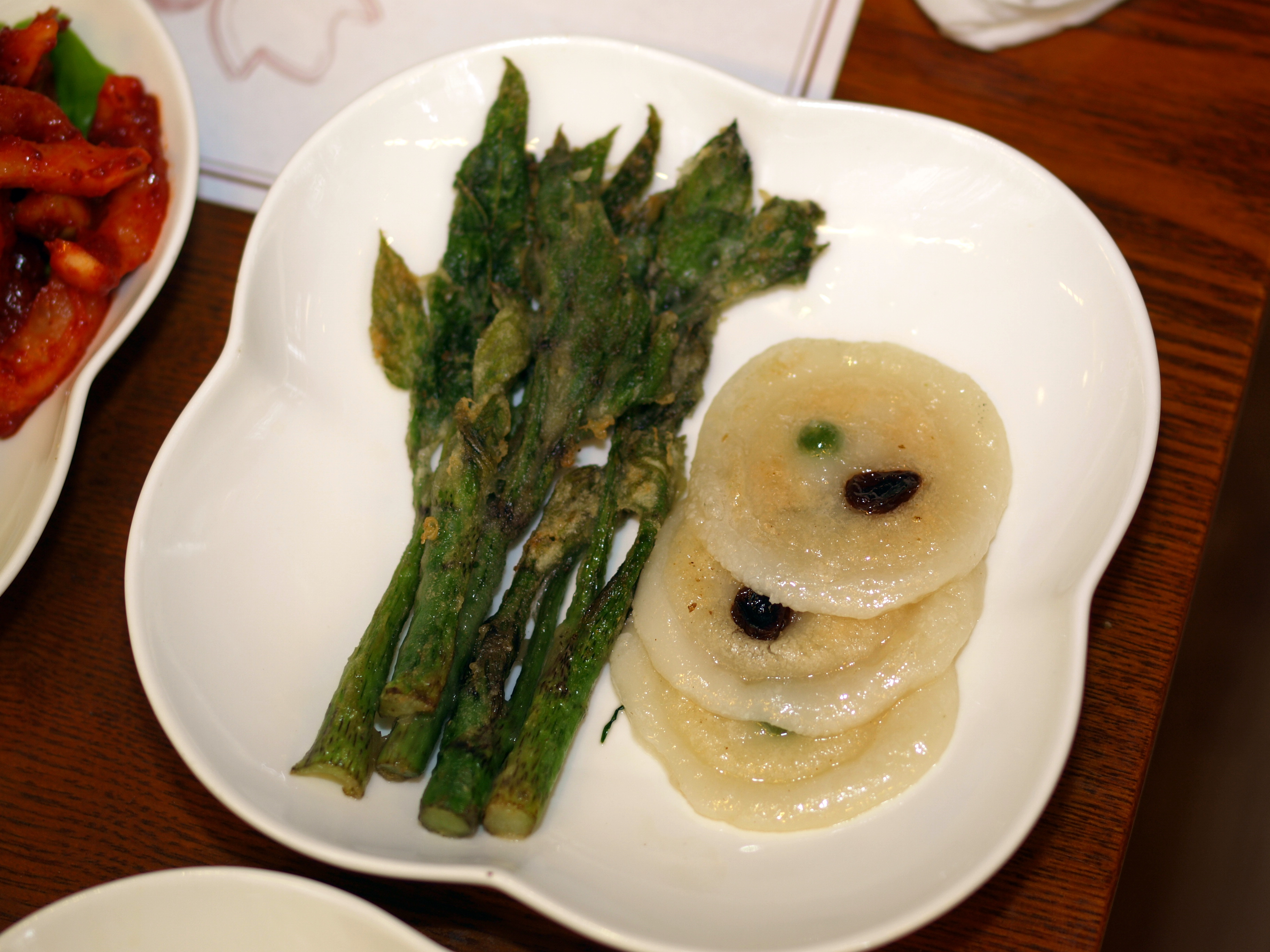
Dureup-bugak (deep fried angelica tree shoots) with chal-jeonbyeong (glutinous rice pancakes)

== See also ==
- Twigak
- Korean temple cuisine
