= Gulf of Maine Research Institute =

American nonprofit organization

- Abbreviation: GMRI
- Formation: 1968
- Purpose: research, education, environmental stewardship
- Location: Union Wharf, Portland, Maine
- Region served: United States
- Official language: English
- CEO: Don Perkins
- Main organ: Board of directors
- Website: GMRI.org
- Formerly called: Gulf of Maine Aquarium; Research Institute of the Gulf of Maine (RIGOM)

The Gulf of Maine Research Institute (GMRI) is a non-profit marine science center and research institute located in Portland, Maine. The institute promotes ecosystem stewardship, supports sustainable seafood, cultivates science literacy, and strengthens coastal communities.

== History ==
Originally established as the Research Institute of the Gulf of Maine (RIGOM) in 1968, the organization aimed to educate young learners about Maine’s fresh- and saltwater resources while conducting research on the Gulf of Maine and its watershed.

In 1988, the organization initiated efforts to establish a public aquarium. However, after extensive market research, an aquarium was deemed unfeasible. Instead, the organization focused on developing a marine research laboratory that would also serve as a hub for science education. The 44,000 sq ft (4,100 m^{2}) marine research and education facility opened in 2005. Additionally, the institute launched Vital Signs, an online education program for Maine schoolchildren.

Today, the endowed institute continues to advance ocean stewardship and economic growth within the Gulf of Maine bioregion. Its Science, Education, and Community programs are primarily funded through federal grants and charitable contributions.

In December 2022, the institute acquired Portland's Union Wharf, marking the end of five generations of family ownership.

== Recent accomplishments ==
- Launched a virtual climate center to address the critical issue of climate change in the oceans
- Renovated the Cohen Center for Interactive Learning and developed new climate-focused content for 5th and 6th grade students
- Published the reports: "Preparing for Emerging Fisheries: An Overview of Mid-Atlantic Stocks on the Move" and "An Independent Evaluation of the Maine Limited Entry Licensing System for Lobster and Crab"
- created the Gulf of Maine Responsibly Harvested brand
- Expanded the Marine Resource Education Program whose goal is to:
  - bring fishermen, scientists and managers together in a neutral setting outside the regulatory process
  - increase the number of people at work in New England fisheries who are comfortable working with the fishery data and management systems.
