= Gulf of Maine Closed Areas =

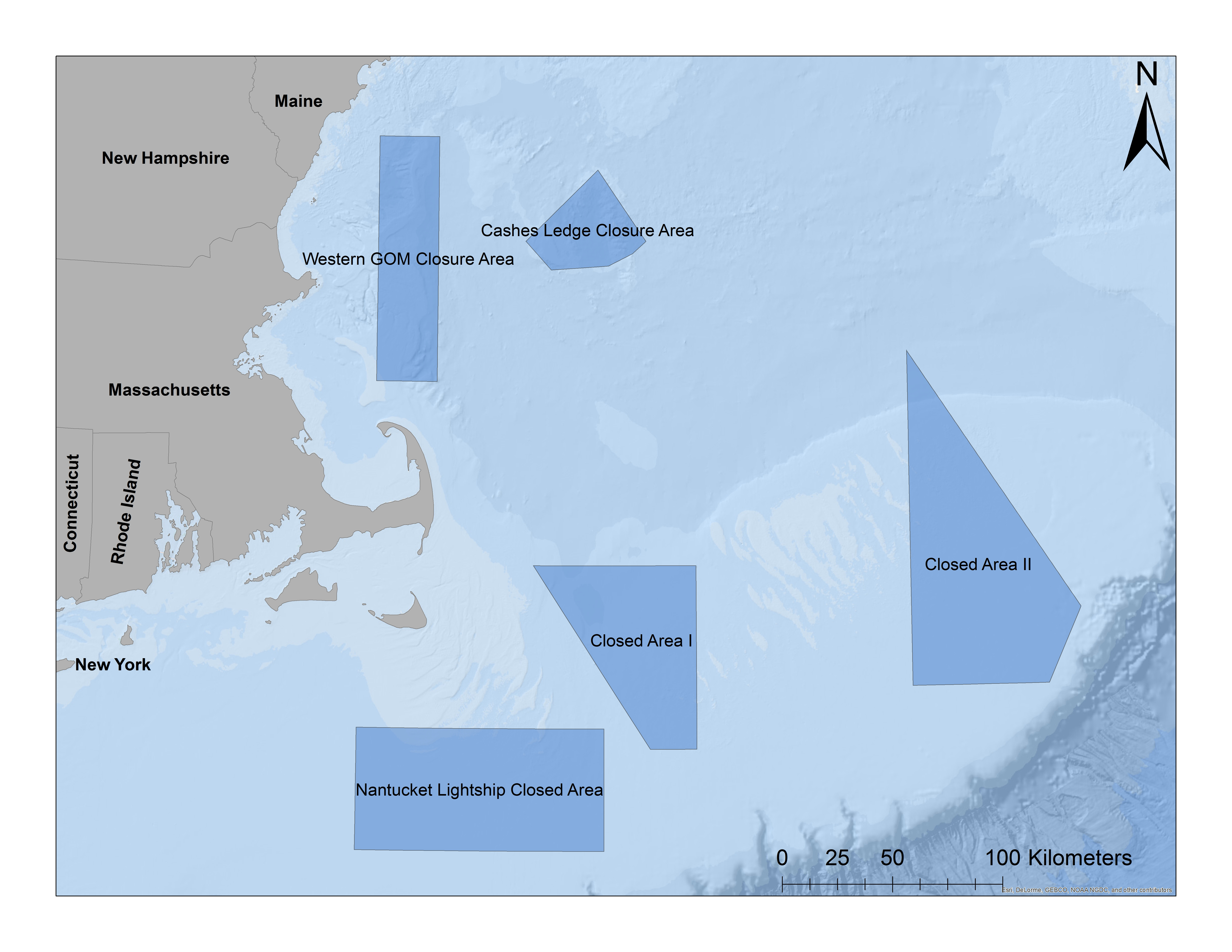
Gulf of Maine Closed Areas

The Gulf of Maine has been fished since the 1700s, and has been a historic fishing area since. Climate change is having significant impacts on this ecosystem; between 2004 and 2013, the Gulf of Maine has warmed faster than 99.9% of the global oceans, increasing average temperature by 2 °C (3.6 °F). Having seen the depletion of groundfish stocks starting in the early 1990s, managers took care to create five closure areas in the Gulf of Maine.

These closed areas do not prohibit all fishing, rather they prevent the further degradation of benthic habitat and groundfish species. Closed areas are different than Marine Protected Areas (MPA) because they allow some forms of fishing and other activities to occur that would normally not be allowed in MPA.

== Western Gulf of Maine Closure Area ==
=== Background ===
The Western Gulf of Maine Closure Area (WGoMAC) was established in 1998 in response to the decreasing Atlantic Cod (Gadus morhua) stock. WGoMAC is located off the shores of Massachusetts, New Hampshire, and Maine and is approximately 3,100 km^{2} (1,200 sq mi). It is rectangular and runs in straight lines from 42° 15' to 43° 15' North, and 69° 55' to 70° 15' West.

It is a year long closed area that prevents groundfish fishing. Fishing vessels that are using exempted gear (pelagic trawls and nets) are allowed. Charter and recreational vessels are allowed and may fish with a Letter of Authorization (LOA) from a Regional Administrator.

== Cashes Ledge Closure Area ==
=== Background ===
Cashes Ledge Closure Area (CL) was permanently closed in 1998, in response to overfished groundfish resources. The area boundaries of the five sided polygon that is CL run from 42° 42.5' to 43° 0.7' North, and 68° 46' to 69° 26' West.

Cashes Ledge is a shallow habitat (30–33 m (98–108 ft)) known for being rocky bottom habitat, located 130 km (81 mi) off the Northeastern US shore. It is a year long closed area that prevents groundfish fishing. Fishing vessels that are using exempted gear (pelagic trawls and nets) are allowed. Charter and recreational vessels are allowed and may fish with a Letter of Authorization (LOA) from a Regional Administrator.

=== Impact on fisheries ===
This area serves as habitat for fish such as cod and pollock, and cod found in these areas have a higher mean age and gut fullness. This indicates that the closed area is working, and the fish are living longer and have access to more food. With cod stock having been decreased steadily since the early 1990s, having healthier and more robust fish will positively impact the ecosystem.

== Closed Area I ==
=== Background ===
Closed Area I (CA-I) was established in 1994 in an effort to protect benthic habitat and groundfish species. The area boundaries of the four sided polygon run from 40° 45' to 41° 30' North and 68° 30' to 69° 23' West.

It is a year long closed area that prevents groundfish fishing. Fishing vessels that are suing exempted gear (pelagic trawls and nets) are allowed. Vessels using a midwater trawl are allowed and may fish with a LOA from a Regional Administrator. Because of the success of the scalloping industry, scallop fishing is allowed, as well as vessels in the multispecies Special Access Program (SAP).

=== Impact on fisheries ===
CA-I is known for high aggregations of haddock, with 73% of the US catch being within 5 km (3.1 mi) of the closed area. It is an area also known for winter flounder and yellowtail flounder, suggesting these closed areas are aiding unsustainable populations. The northern edge of CA-I is fished intensely.

== Closed Area II ==
=== Background ===
Closed Area II (CA-II) was established in 1994 in an effort to protect benthic habitat and groundfish species. The area boundaries of the four sided polygon run from 41° 00' to 42° 22' North and 66° 35.8' to 67° 20' West.

It is a year long closed area that prevents groundfish fishing. Fishing vessels that are suing exempted gear (pelagic trawls and nets) are allowed. Vessels using a midwater trawl are allowed and may fish with a LOA from a Regional Administrator. Because of the success of the scalloping industry, scallop fishing is allowed, as well as vessels in the groundfish Special Access Program (SAP).

=== Impact on fisheries ===
This area serves as habitat for fish such as cod and pollock, and cod found in these areas have a higher mean age and gut fullness. This indicates that the closed area is working, and the fish are living longer and have access to more food. With cod stock having been decreased steadily since the early 1990s, having healthier and more robust fish will positively impact the ecosystem. The southern edge of CA-II is fished intensely.

== Nantucket Lightship Closed Area ==
=== Background ===
Nantucket Lightship Closed Area (NLCA) was established in 1994 in an effort to protect benthic habitat and groundfish species. It is rectangular and runs in straight lines from 40° 20' to 40° 50' North, and 69° 00' to 70° 20' West.

It is a year long closed area that prevents groundfish fishing. Fishing vessels that are using exempted gear (pelagic trawls and nets) are allowed. Vessels using a midwater trawl are allowed and may fish with a LOA from a Regional Administrator. Because of the success of the scalloping industry, scallop fishing is allowed, as well as vessels using surf clam or quahog dredging gear. Charter and recreational vessels are also allowed and may fish with a LOA from a Regional Administrator.
