= Union Wharf (Portland, Maine) =

Historic wharf in Portland, Maine, U.S.

Coordinates: 43°39′12″N 70°15′10″W

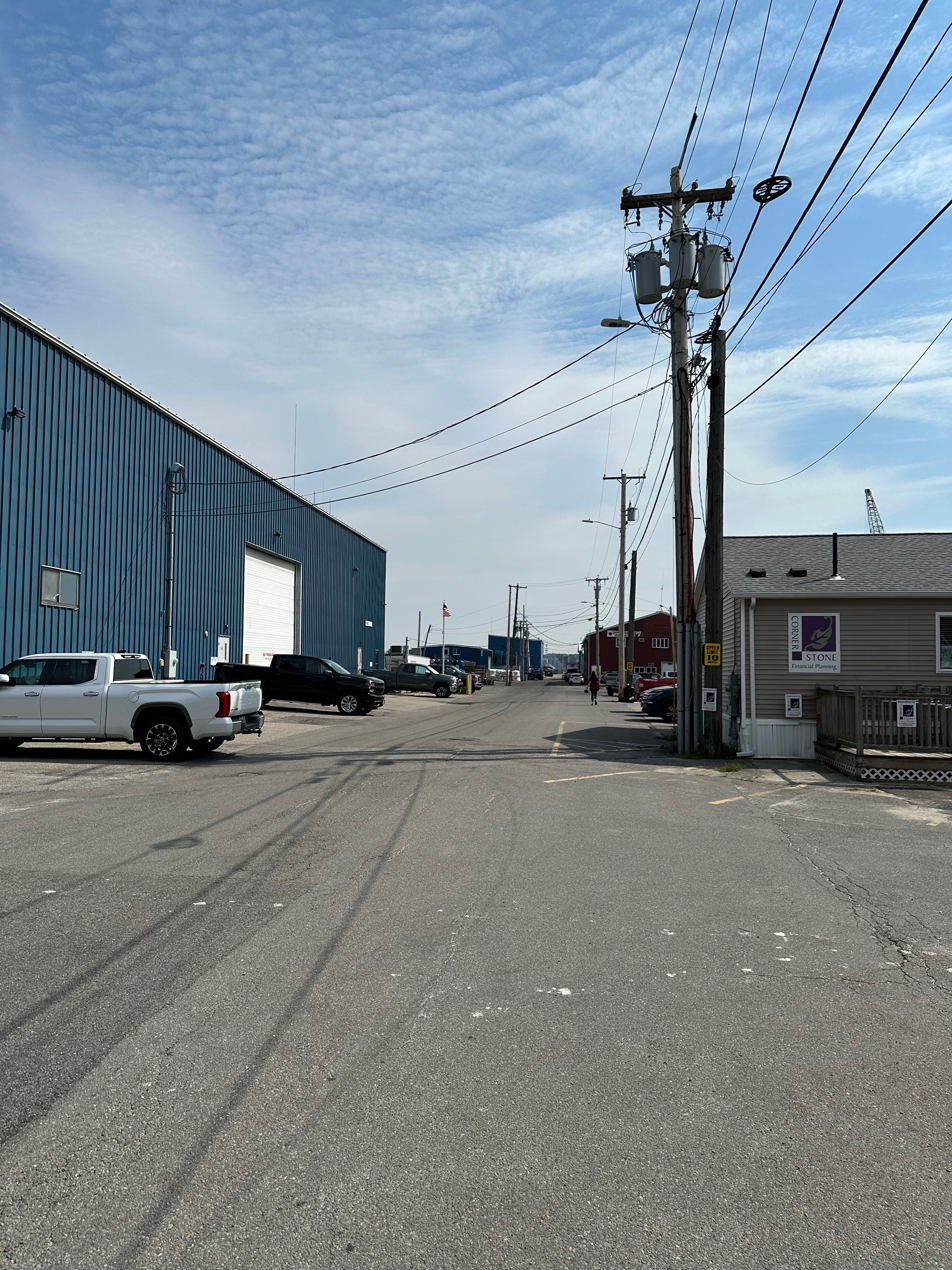
- The wharf in 2023
- Location: Commercial Street, Portland, Maine, U.S.

Construction
- Construction start: 1793 (233 years ago)

Union Wharf is a historic wharf in Portland, Maine. It stands across Commercial Street from Union Street and, on the waterfront side, between Widgery Wharf (to the north) and Merrill's Wharf (to the south), on the edge of the Fore River.

Dating to 1793, it is the city's oldest continuously used wharf. In December 2021, five generations of family ownership ended when the wharf was sold to the Gulf of Maine Research Institute.
