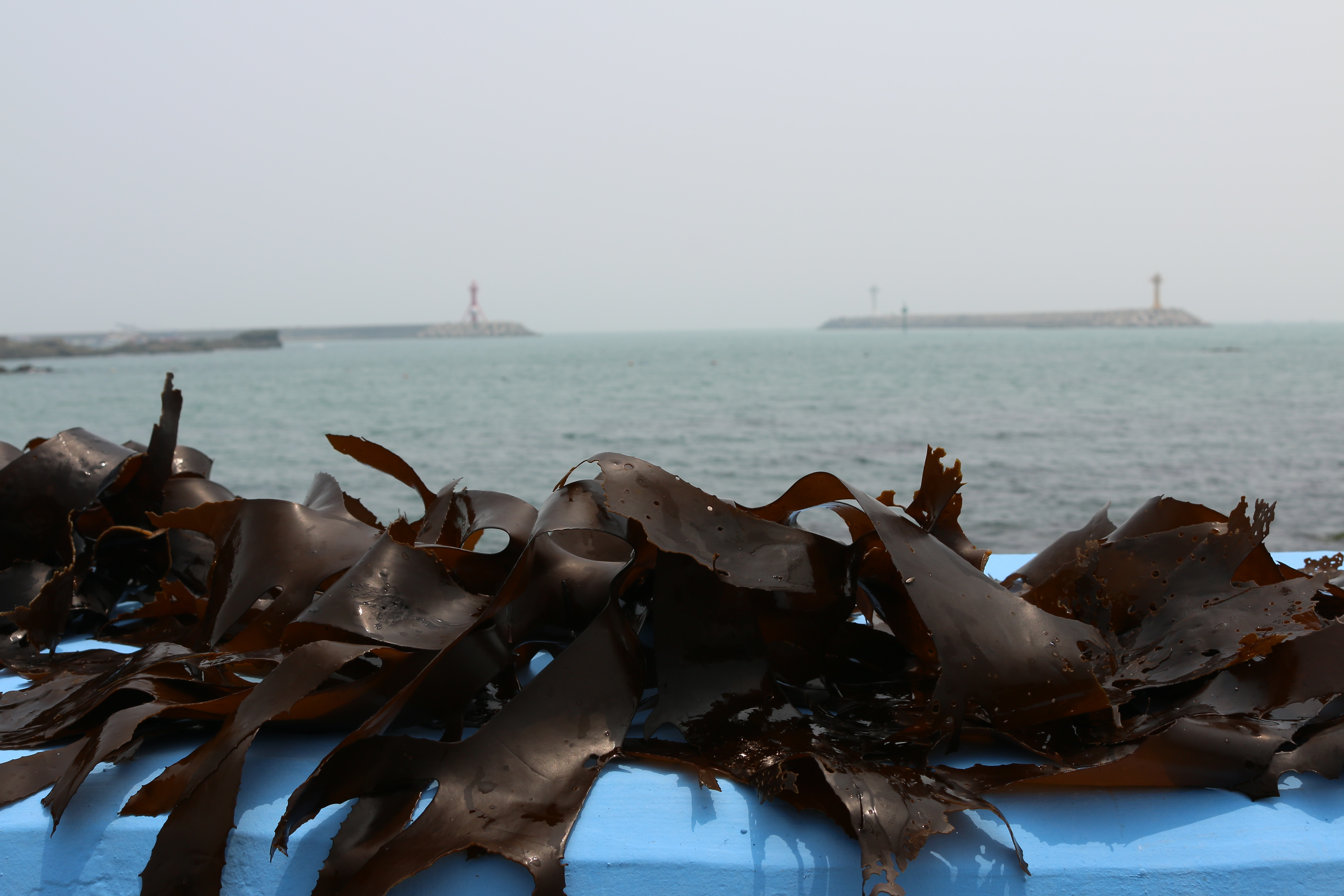

Scientific classification
- Domain: Eukaryota
- Clade: Sar
- Clade: Stramenopiles
- Division: Ochrophyta
- Class: Phaeophyceae
- Order: Laminariales
- Family: Laminariaceae
- Genus: Saccharina
- Species: S. japonica

Binomial name
- Saccharina japonica (J.E. Areschoug) C.E. Lane, C. Mayes, Druehl & G.W. Saunders

Synonyms
- Laminaria japonica J.E. Areschoug; Laminaria fragilis Miyabe, 1902; Laminaria ochotensis Miyabe, 1902; Laminaria diabolica Miyabe, 1902; Saccharina religiosa Miyabe, 1902

= Saccharina japonica =

Species of seaweed

Saccharina japonica is a marine species of the Phaeophyceae (brown algae) class, a type of kelp or seaweed, which is extensively cultivated on ropes between the seas of China, Japan and Korea. It has the common name sweet kelp. It is widely eaten in East Asia. A commercially important species, S. japonica is also called ma-konbu (真昆布) in Japanese, dasima (다시마) in Korean and hǎidài (海带) in Chinese. Large harvests are produced by rope cultivation which is a simple method of growing seaweeds by attaching them to floating ropes in the ocean.

The species has been cultivated in China, Japan, Korea, Russia and France. It is one of the two most consumed species of kelp in China and Japan. Saccharina japonica is also used for the production of alginates, with China producing up to ten thousand tons of the product each year.

S. japonica contains very high amounts of iodine. Excessive consumption (15 g/day, containing 35 mg iodine) suppresses thyroid function, though thyroid hormone levels remain within normal limits.

== Nomenclature ==
The species was transferred to Saccharina in 2006. Three synonyms for this species name are Laminaria japonica (J. E. Areschoug 1851), its variety Laminaria japonica var. ochotensis (Miyabe & Okamura 1936) and Laminaria ochotensis (Miyabe 1902). In addition, a 2026 study considered that S. diabolicha and S. religiosa are also synonymous.

== Cultivation ==
Over 90% of Japanese kombu is cultivated in Hokkaidō. With the development of cultivation technology, production can also be found as far as south of the Seto Inland Sea.

Capture (blue) and aquaculture (green) production of Saccharina japonica in million tonnes from 1950 to 2022, as reported by the FAO

== Culinary use ==
=== China ===
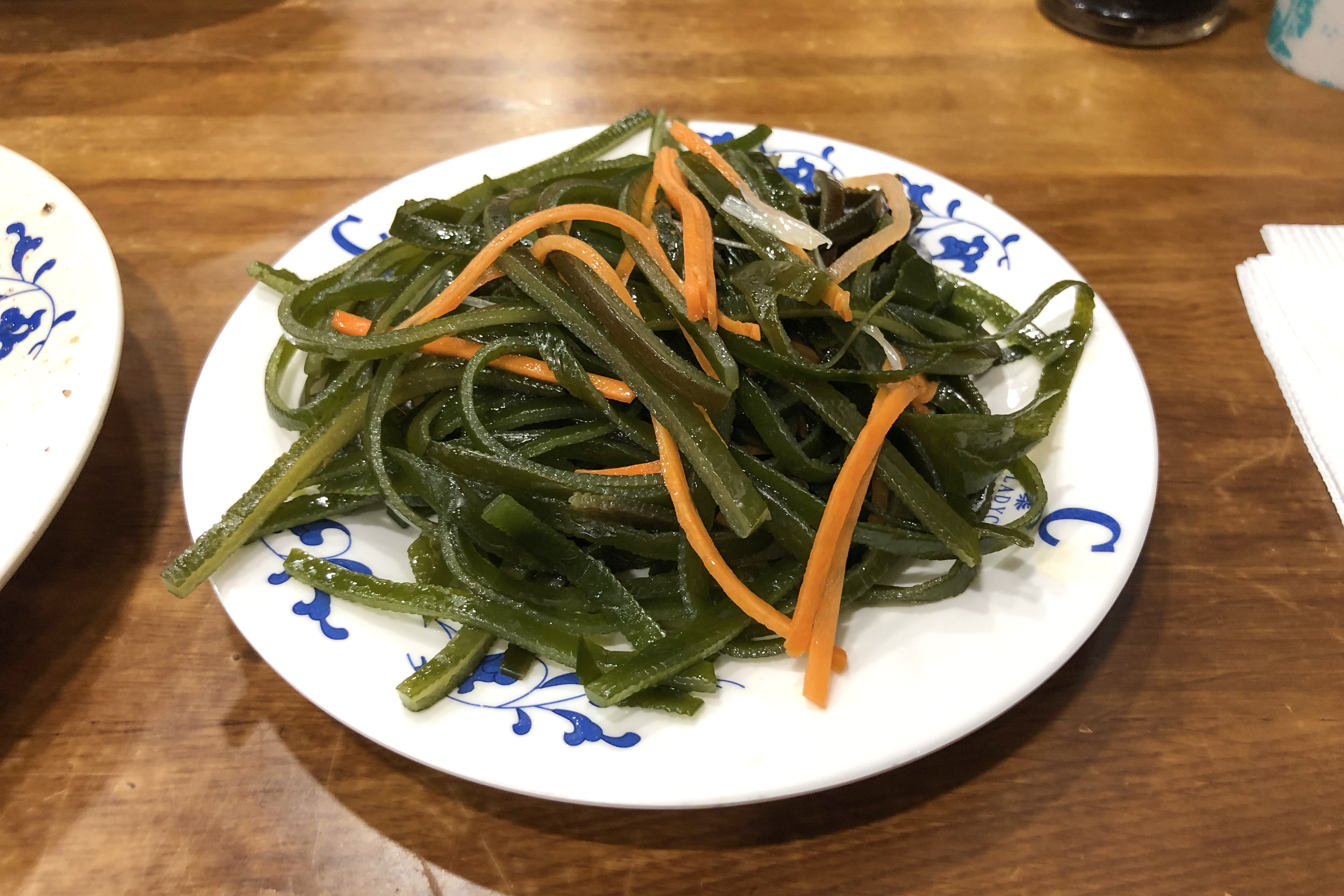
Cold sliced kelp at a restaurant in Beijing, China

In Chinese cuisine, sliced kelp is a common hors d'oeuvre which is often consumed with alcohol.

=== Korea ===
In Korean cuisine, dasima is used to make broth, deep-fried into bugak or twigak (coated and uncoated fries), pickled in soy sauce as jangajji, and eaten raw as a sea vegetable for ssam (wraps).

It is also used to make dasima-cha (kelp tea).

Cheonsa-chae (kelp noodles) is made from the alginic acid from dasima.

One of Nongshim's instant noodle, the Korean original versions of Neoguri, contains one (or rarely more) big piece of dasima in every package. Odongtong Myon, Ottogi's copy of Neoguri, also has big piece of dasima in every package - Ottogi uses 2 dasimas since 2020.

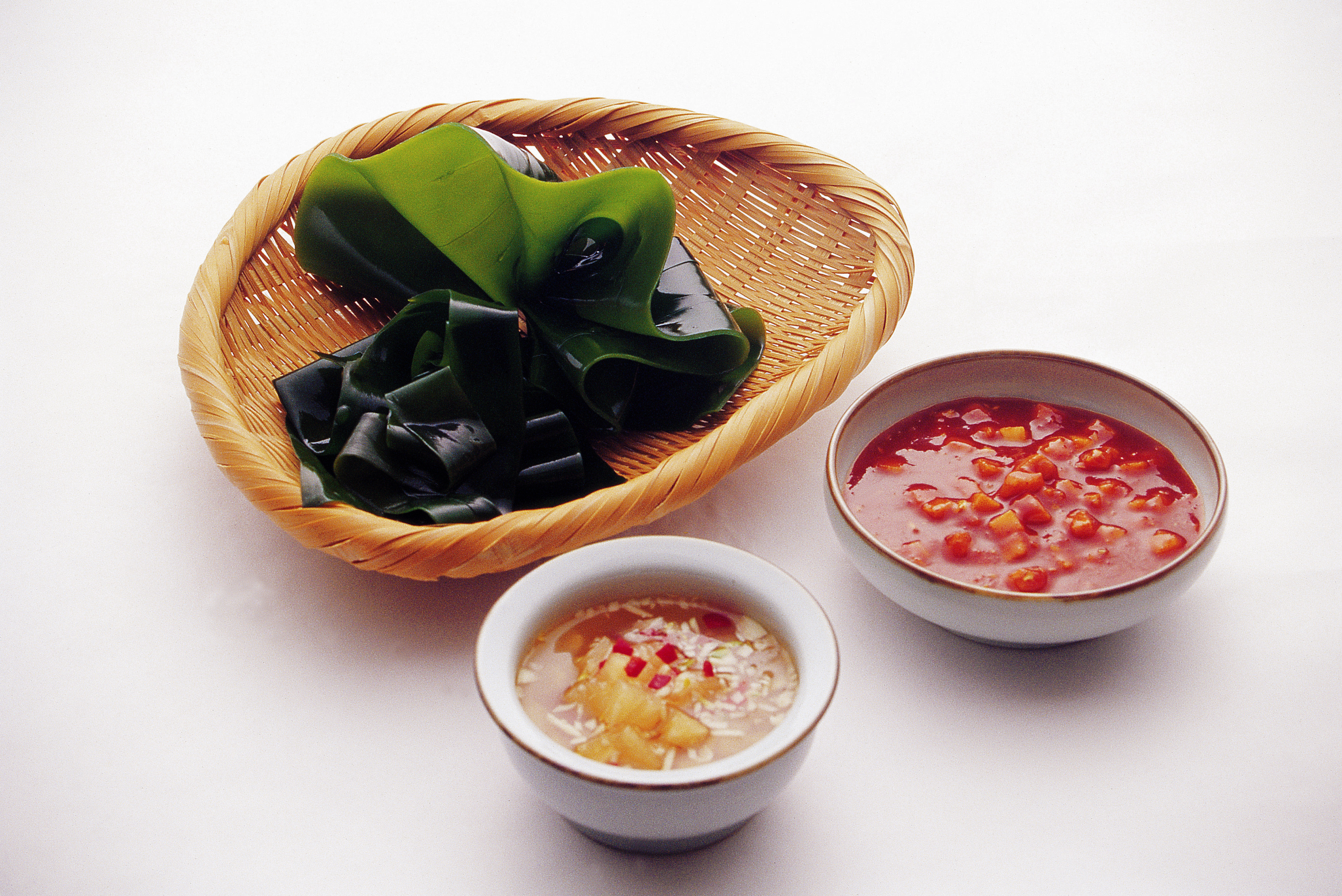
Raw dasima served as a ssam vegetable, with dipping sauces

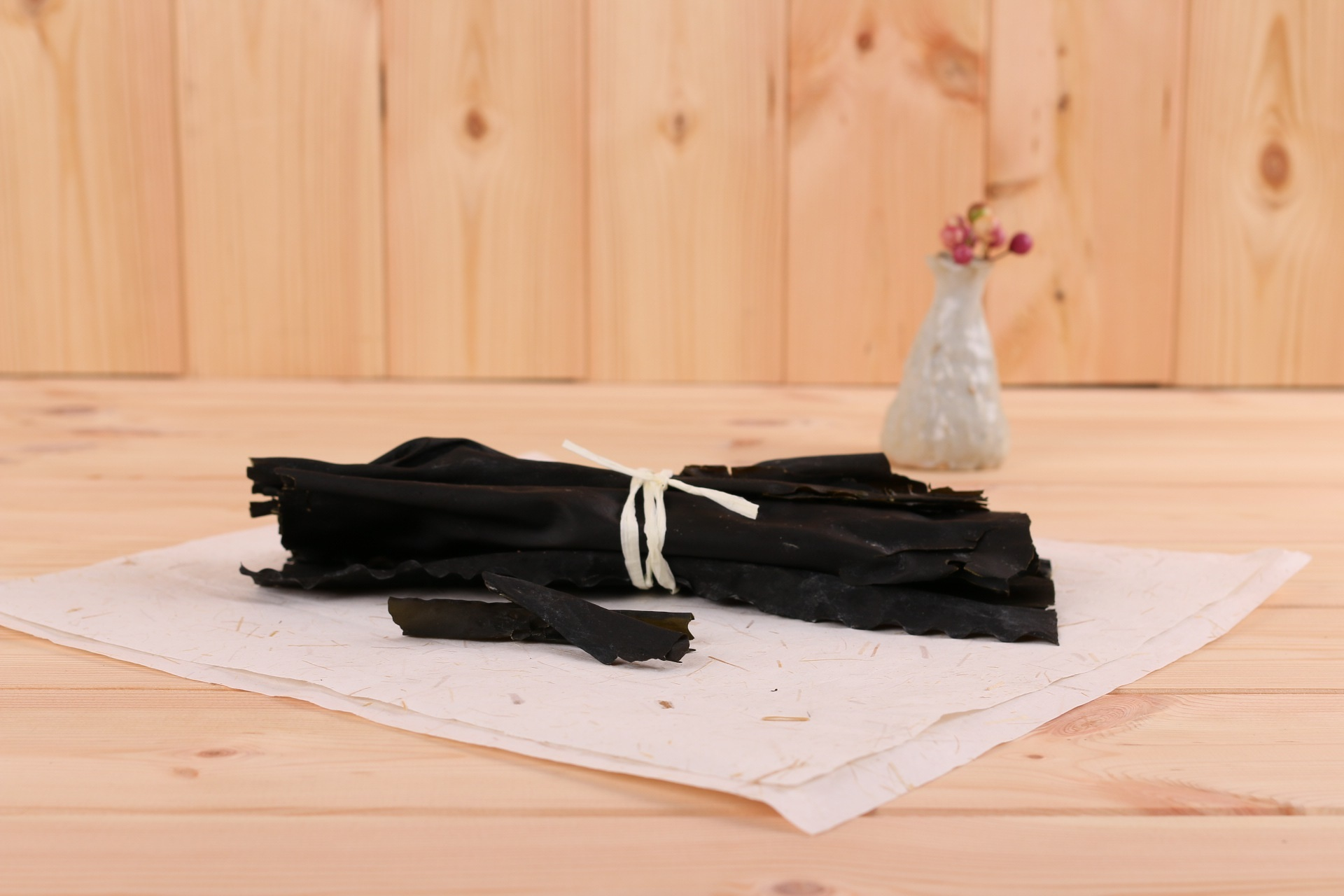
Dried dasima for broth

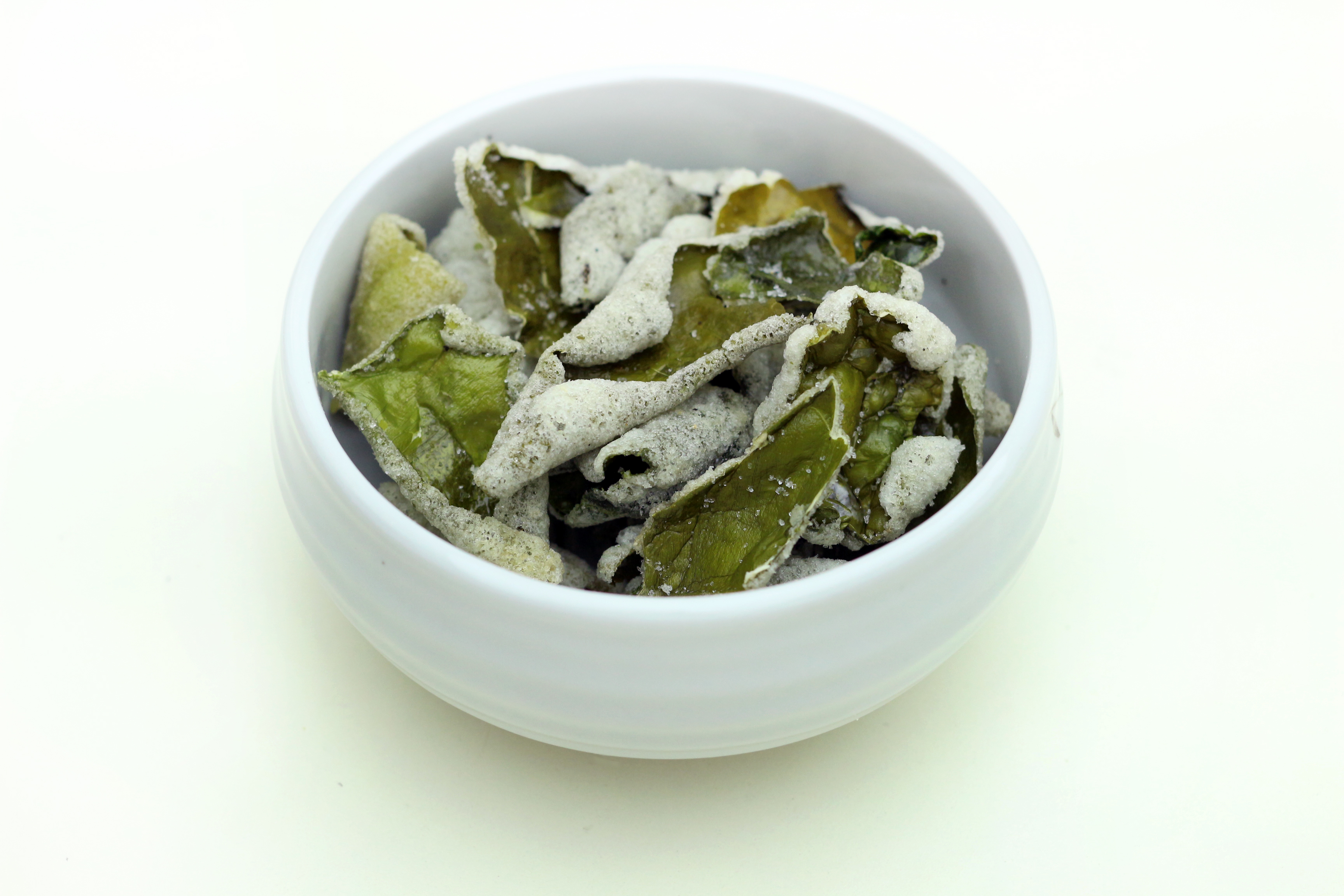
Dasima-bugak (deep-fried kelp snack)

== See also ==
- Edible seaweed
- Kelp
- Kelp tea
- Seafood allergy
- Vitamin B12
- Laverbread
