= Kombu =

Edible kelp

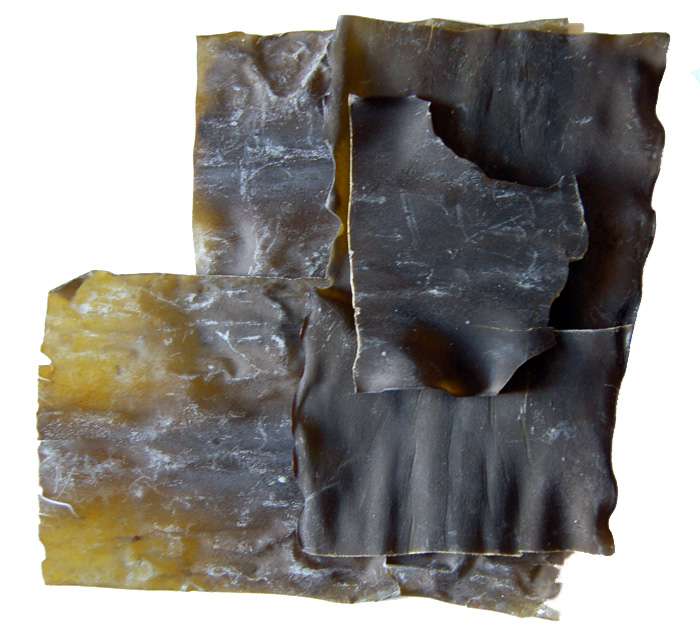
Dried kombu

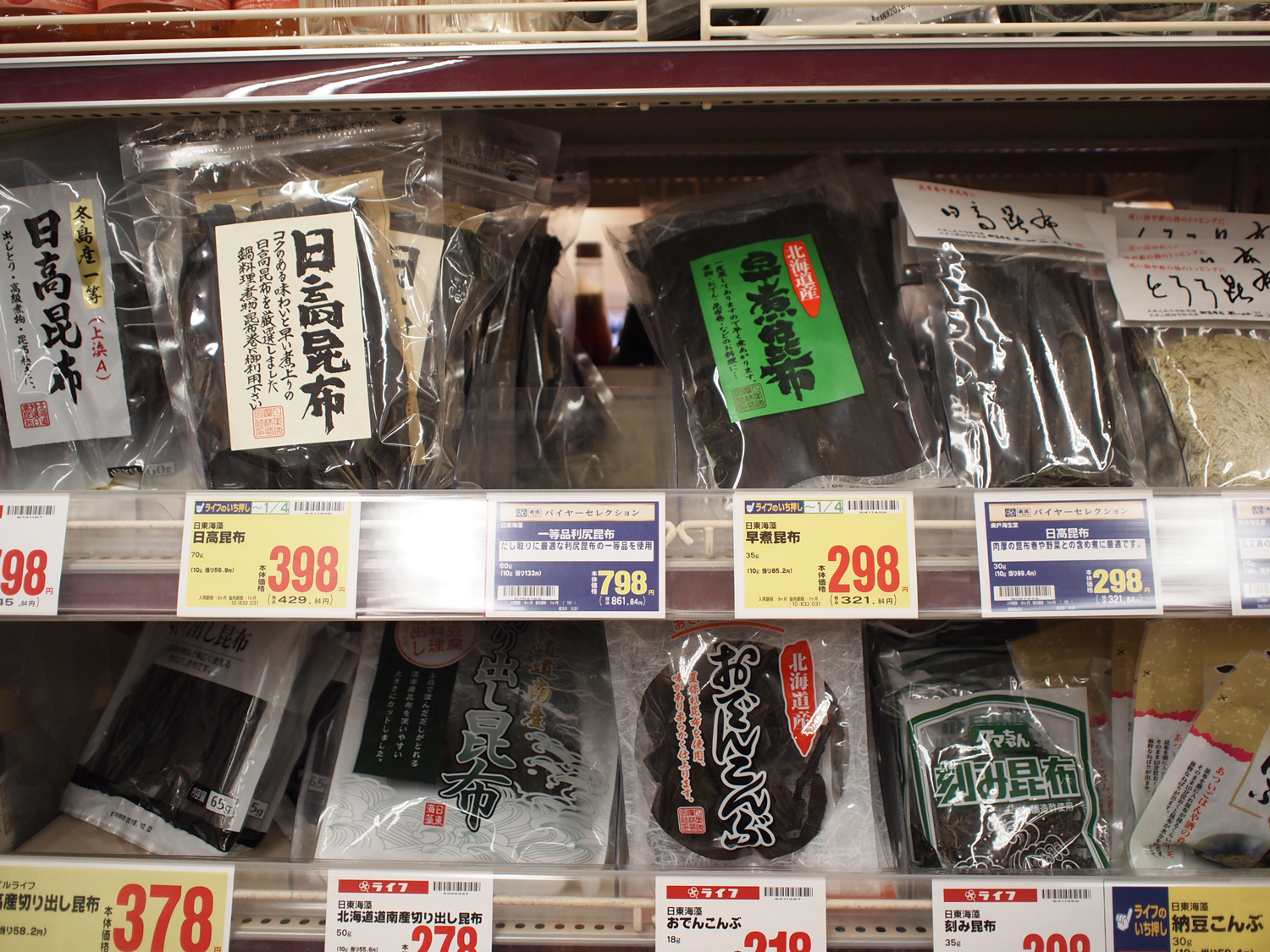
Dried kombu sold in a Japanese supermarket

Kombu or Konbu (from Japanese: 昆布, romanized: konbu or kombu) is edible kelp mostly from the family Laminariaceae and is widely eaten in East Asia. It may also be referred to as dasima (Korean: 다시마) or haidai (simplified Chinese: 海带; traditional Chinese: 海帶; pinyin: Hǎidài).

Kelp features in the diets of many civilizations, including Chinese and Icelandic; however, the largest consumers of kelp are the Japanese, who have incorporated kelp and seaweed into their diets for over 1,500 years.

== Prominent species ==
There are about eighteen edible species in Laminariaceae and most of them, but not all, are called kombu. Confusingly, species of Laminariaceae have multiple names in biology and in fisheries science. In the following list, fisheries science synonyms are in parentheses, and Japanese names follow them.

- Saccharina japonica (Laminaria japonica), Ma-kombu
  - Saccharina japonica var. religiosa (Laminaria religiosa), Hosome-kombu
  - Saccharina japonica var. diabolica (Laminaria diabolica), Oni-kombu l
  - Saccharina japonica var. ochotensis (Laminaria ochotensis), Rishiri-kombu – commonly used for soup stocks
- Saccharina latissima (Laminaria saccharina), Karafuto-kombu – contains mannitol and is considered sweeter
- Saccharina angustata (Laminaria angustata), Mitsuishi-kombu – commonly used in the making of dashi
- Saccharina longissima (Laminaria longissima), Naga-kombu
- Saccharina coriacea (Laminaria coriacea), Gaggara-kombu
- Saccharina sculpera (Kjellmaniella sculpera), Gagome-kombu
- Saccharina longipedalis (Laminaria longipedalis), Enaga-kombu
- Saccharina gyrata (Kjellmaniella gyrata), tororo-kombu
- Saccharina cichorioides (Laminaria cichorioides), Chijimi-kombu
- Arthrothamnus bifidus, nekoashi-kombu

== Etymology ==
Kombu is a loanword from Japanese.

In Old Japanese, edible seaweed was generically called "me" (cf. wakame, arame) and kanji such as "軍布", 海藻 or "和布" were applied to transcribe the word. Especially, kombu was called hirome (from hiroi, wide) or ebisume (from ebisu). Sometime later the names konfu and kofu appeared respectively in two editions of Iroha Jiruishō in 12th–13th century.

Various theories have been claimed for the origin of the name kombu, with the following two predominant today.

One is that it originated from the on'yomi (Sino-Japanese reading) of the Chinese name 昆布 (kūnbù). The kanji itself already could be seen in Shōsōin Monjo (8th century) and Shoku Nihongi (797) in Japan, and furthermore trace back in China, as early as 3rd century, to the book Wupu Bencao (around 239). Li Shizhen wrote the following in his Bencao Gangmu (1596):

Come to think about it, Wupu Bencao says "綸布 (gūanbù), alias 昆布 (kūnbù)." Then, what is mentioned in the Erya as "(what is pronounced) 綸 resembles 綸. This is in the East China Sea" kūnbù. The pronunciation of 綸 is 関 (gūan), meaning cord made by green thread, and got corrupted to 昆 (kūn).

— Li Shizhen, Bencao Gangmu

Another possibility to explain the association arises because descriptions of kūnbù in Chinese documents are vague and inconsistent, and it is impossible to identify to which seaweed the term might have applied. For instance, Chen Cangqi (681–757) noted: "kūnbù is produced in the South China Sea; its leaf is like a hand and the size is the same as a silver grass and a reed, is of red purple; the thin part of leaf is seaweed", which is similar to wakame, arame, kurome, or kajime (Ecklonia cava). The difficulty is that, at least in that time, kombu was not produced either in the East nor in the South China Sea. Moreover, following Zhang Yxi, Li Shizhen classified kūnbù and haidai (stands for kombu in Chinese) as different things, and this classification continues in China today.

== History ==
Although archaeological evidence of seaweed is hard to find because of its easy decomposition, some plant remains of wakame seaweed are found in some ruins of the Jōmon Period which leads to the supposition that kombu was also eaten at that time. As to surviving documents, the letters 軍布 (in Sino-Japanese reading 軍 is gun/kun; 布 is fu/pu/bu) appeared in Man'yōshū and wood strips from Fujiwara-kyō, and may have indicated kombu. The Shoku Nihongi (797) reports: in 797 Suga no Komahiru of Emishi (Ainu or Tohoku region people) stated they had been offering up kombu, which grew there, as tribute to the Yamato court every year without fail. The Engishiki (927) also reports that kombu had been offered up by Mutsu.

During the Muromachi period, a newly developed drying technique allowed kombu to be stored for more than a few days, and it became an important export from the Tohoku area. By the Edo period, as Hokkaidō was colonized and shipment routes were organized, the use of kombu became widespread throughout Japan. Traditional Okinawan cuisine relies heavily on kombu as a part of the diet; this practice began in the Edo period. Okinawa uses more kombu per household than any other prefecture. In the 20th century, a way to cultivate kombu was discovered and it became cheap and readily available.

In 1867, the word "kombu" first appeared in an English-language publication—A Japanese and English Dictionary by James Curtis Hepburn.

Umami, a basic taste, was first scientifically identified in 1908 by Kikunae Ikeda through his experimentation with kombu. He found that glutamic acid was responsible for the palatability of the dashi broth created from kombu, and was a distinct sensation from sweet, sour, bitter, and salty tastes. Ikeda named the newly-discovered taste umami (うま味), from the Japanese word umai (うまい, "delicious").

Since the 1960s, dried kombu has been exported from Japan to many countries. It was available initially at Asian, and especially Japanese, food shops and restaurants, and can be found in supermarkets, health-food stores, and other nonspecializing suppliers.

== Cooking ==
Kombu is sold dried (dashi konbu) or pickled in vinegar (su konbu) or as a dried shred (oboro konbu, tororo konbu or shiraga konbu). It may also be eaten fresh in sashimi.

Kombu is used extensively in Japanese cuisines as one of the three main ingredients needed to make dashi, a soup stock. Konbu dashi is made by putting either whole dried or powdered kombu in cold water and heating it to near-boiling. The softened kombu is commonly eaten after cooking or is sliced and used to make tsukudani, a dish that is simmered in soy sauce and mirin.

Kombu may be pickled with sweet-and-sour flavoring, cut into small strips about 5 or 6 cm long and 2 cm wide. These are often eaten as a snack with green tea. It is often included when cooking beans, putatively to add nutrients and improve their digestibility.

Konbu-cha or kobu-cha (昆布茶) is a tea made by infusing kombu in hot water. What Americans call kombucha is called "kōcha kinoko" in Japan.

Kombu is also used to prepare a seasoning for rice to be made into sushi.

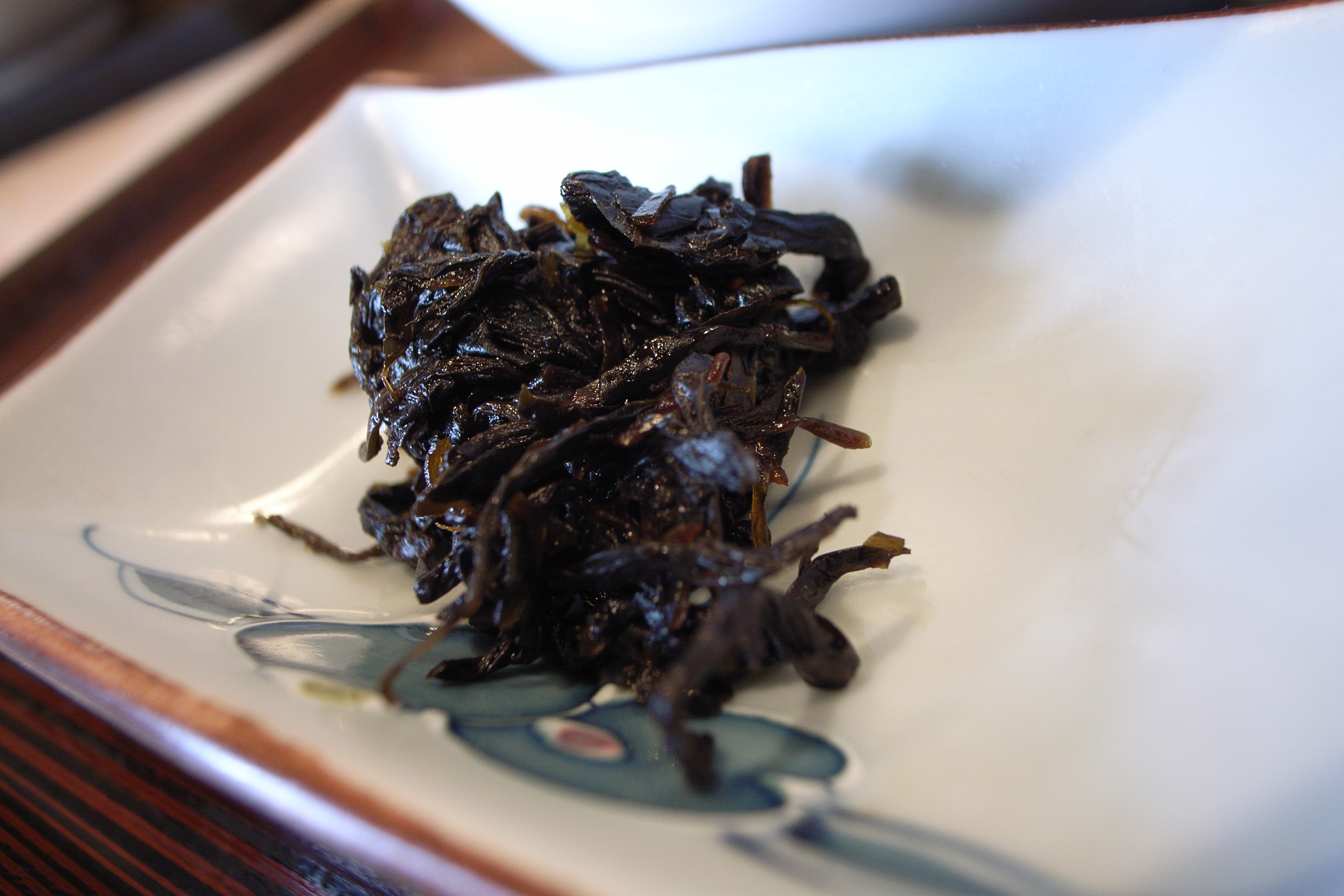
A dish of tsukudani made from kombu

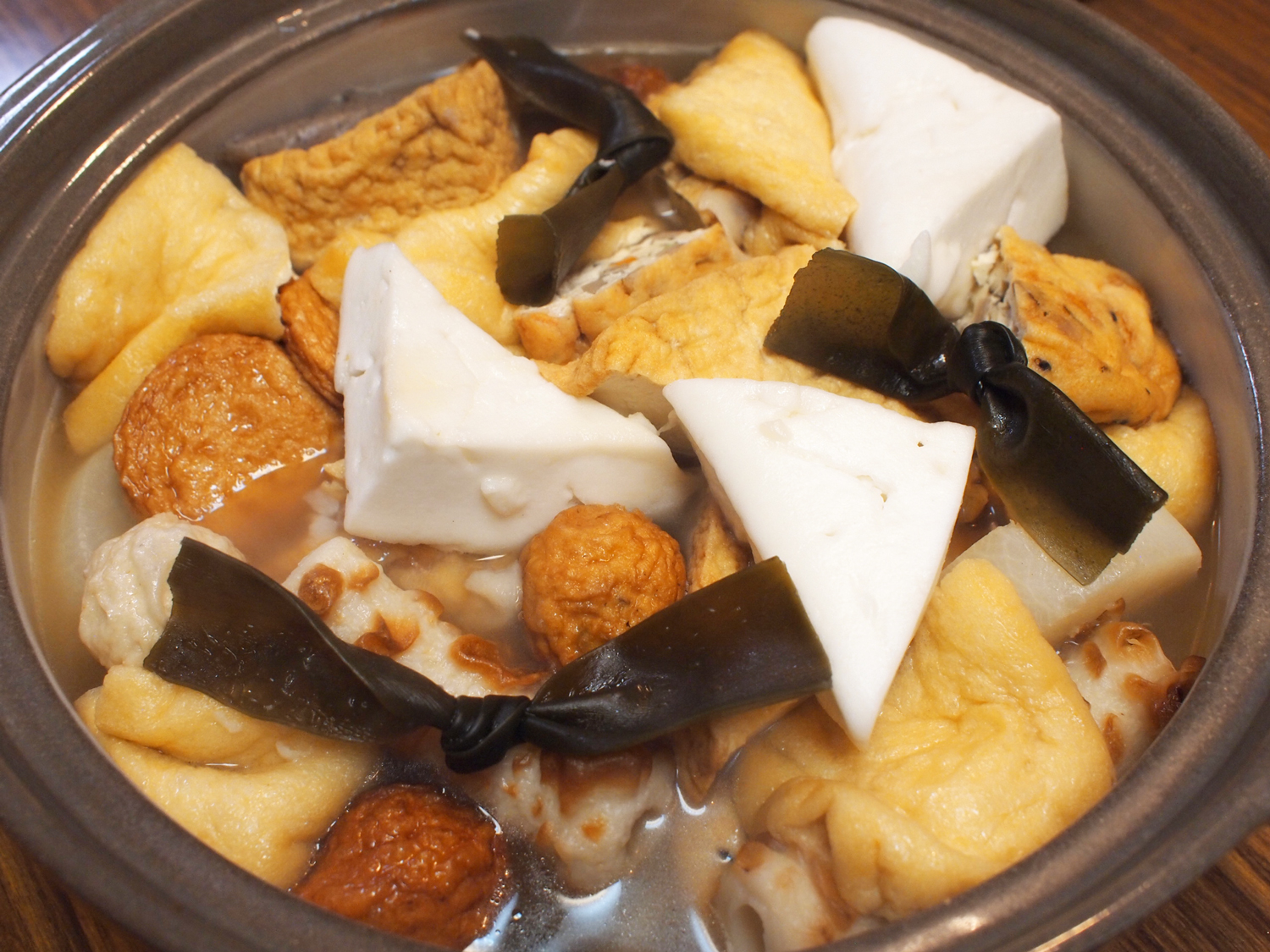
Kombu in Oden

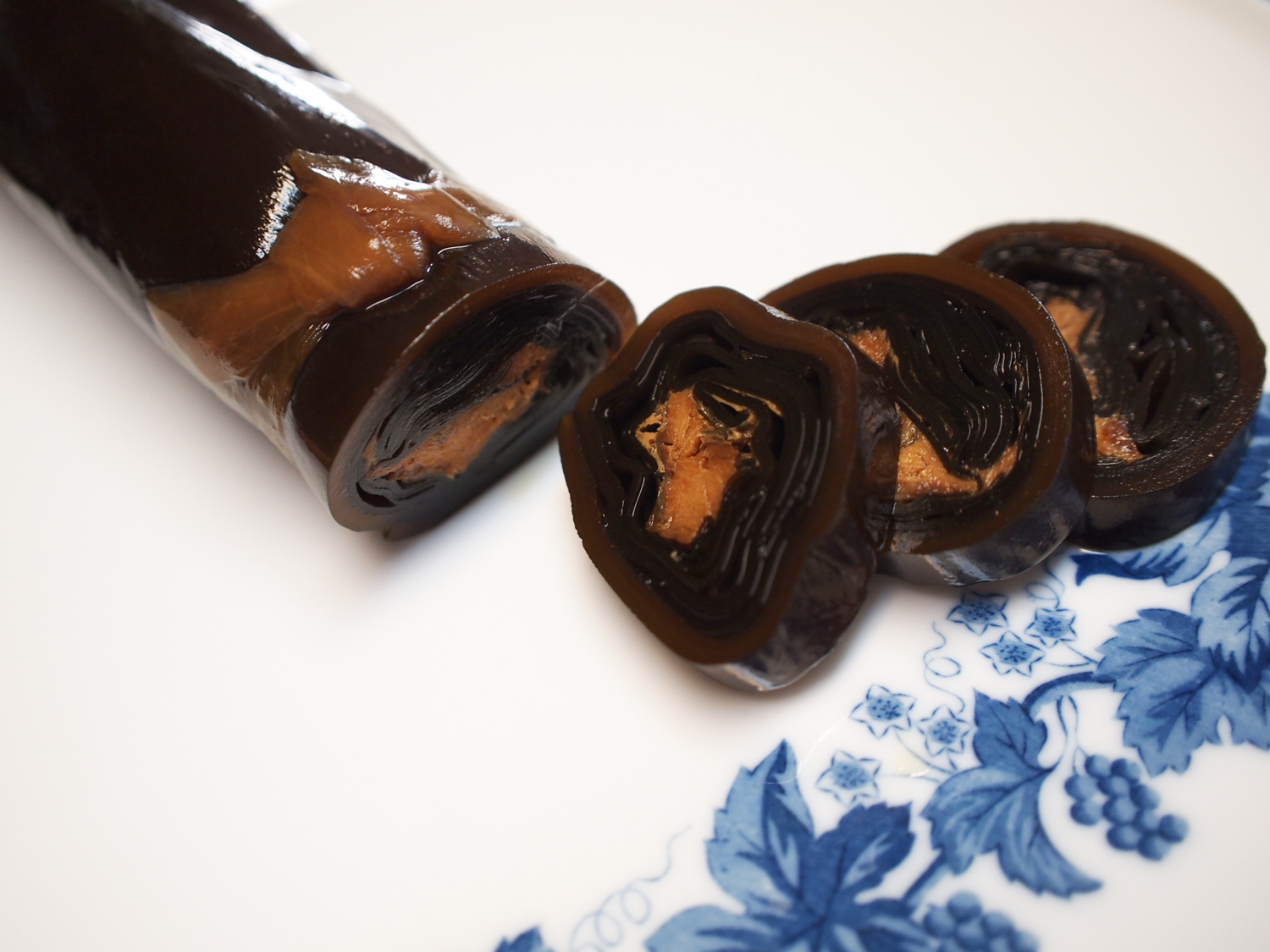
Kobumaki (kombu roll). Usually fish such as herring is inside.

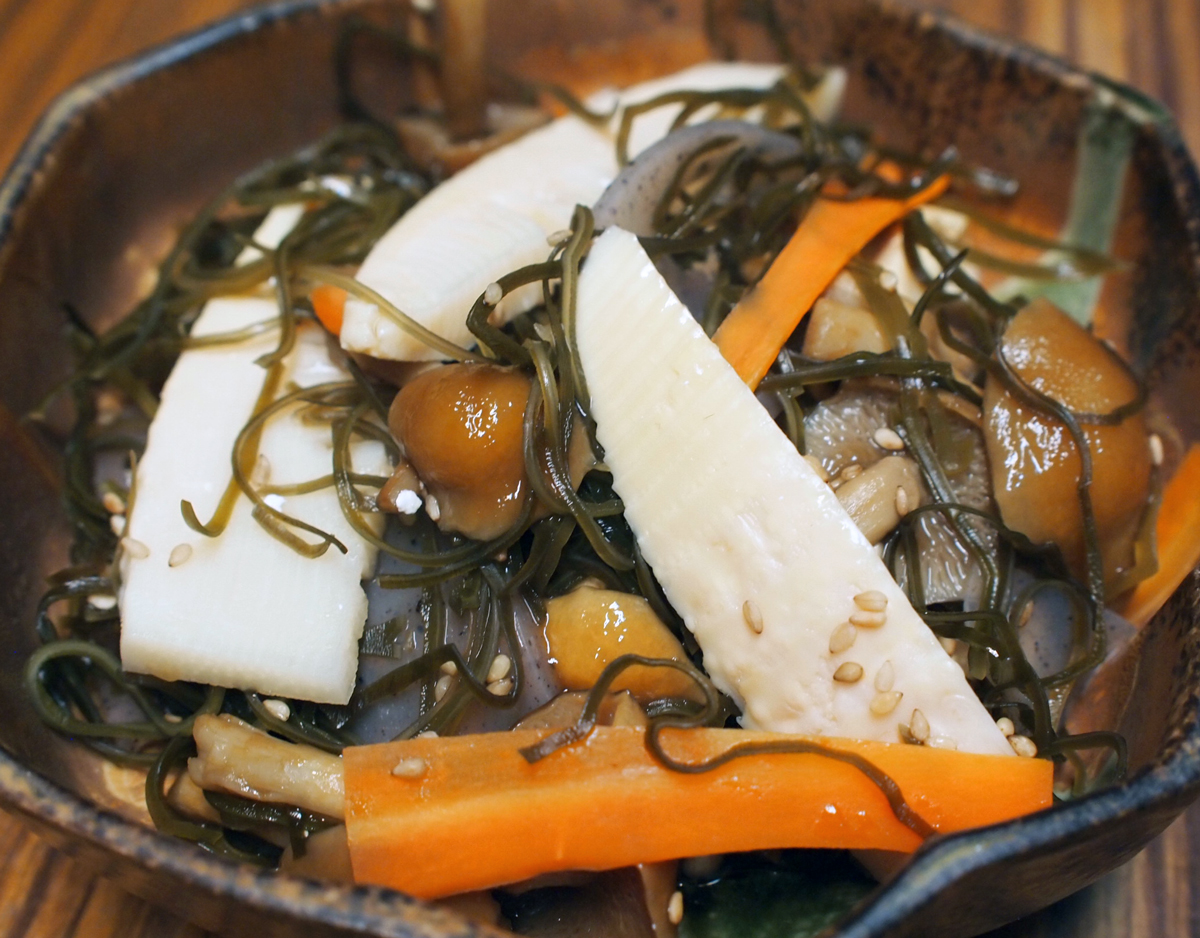
Nimono with kombu

== Nutrition and health effects ==
Kombu is a good source of glutamic acid, an amino acid responsible for umami (the Japanese word used for a basic taste identified in 1908). Several foodstuffs in addition to kombu provide glutamic acid or glutamates.

Kombu contains extremely high levels of iodine. While this element is essential for normal growth and development, the levels in kombu can cause overdoses; it has been blamed for thyroid problems after drinking large amounts of soy milk in which kombu was an additive.

It is also a source of dietary fiber. Algae including kombu also contain entire families of obscure enzymes that break down complex sugars that are normally indigestible to the human gut (thus gas-causing). It also contains the well-studied alpha-galactosidase and beta-galactosidase enzymes.

== Biofuel ==
Genetically manipulated E. coli bacteria can digest kombu into ethanol, making it a possible maritime biofuel source.

== See also ==
- Kelp – Large brown seaweeds in the order Laminariales
- Laverbread – Food made from edible seaweed
