= Saccharina angustata =

Scientific classification
- Domain: Eukaryota
- Clade: Sar
- Clade: Stramenopiles
- Division: Ochrophyta
- Class: Phaeophyceae
- Order: Laminariales
- Family: Laminariaceae
- Genus: Saccharina
- Species: S. angustata

Binomial name
- Saccharina angustata (Kjellman) C.E.Lane, C.Mayes, Druehl & G.W.Saunders, 2006

Synonyms
- Laminaria angustata Kjellman, 1885

Species of Phaeophyceae

Saccharina angustata, known also as Hidaka kombu, is a species of brown algae (class Phaeophyceae), in the family Laminariaceae. It is native to the north Pacific and is edible. In Japan it is often used in the making of dashi.
