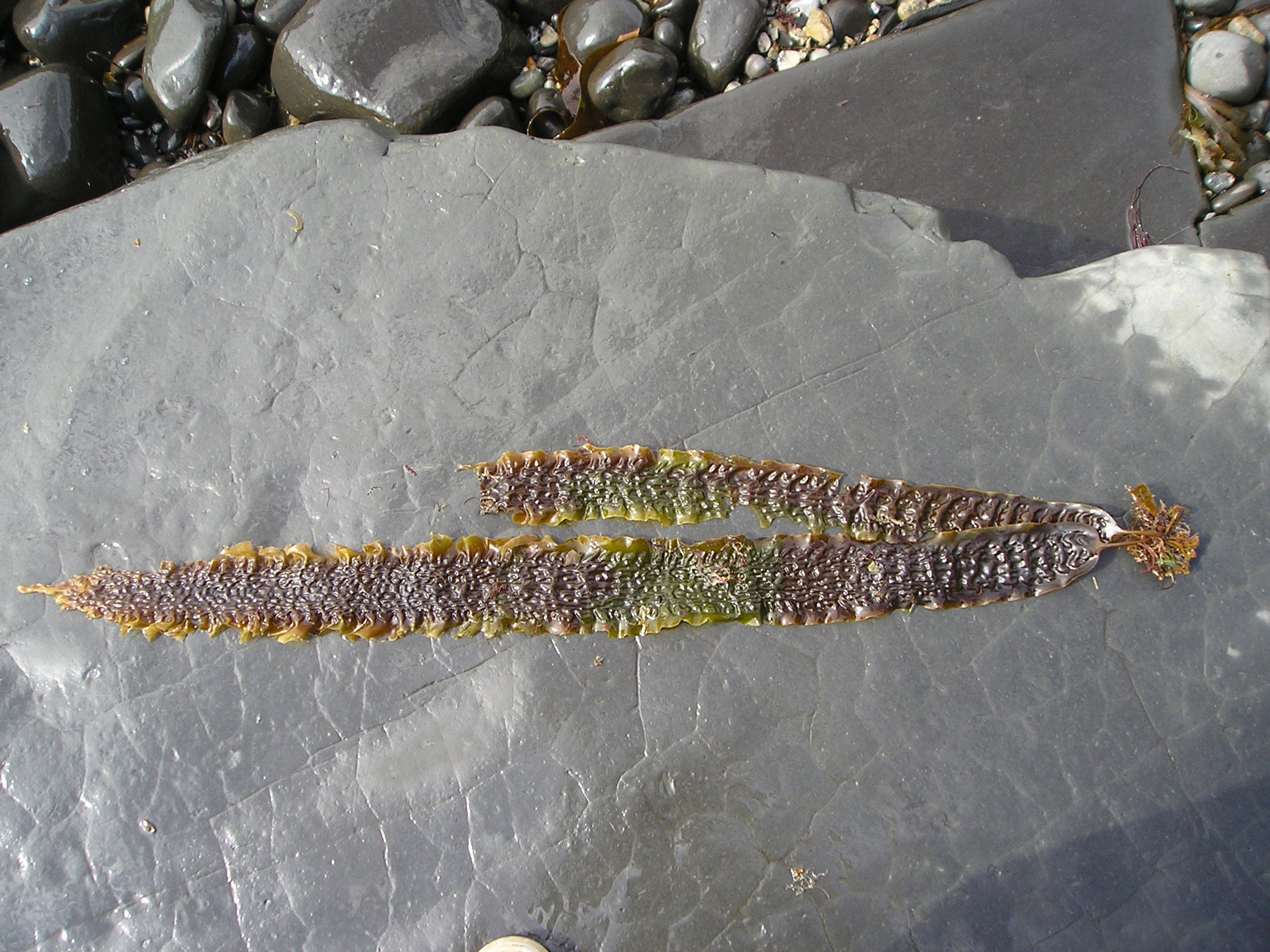

Scientific classification
- Domain: Eukaryota
- Supergroup: Stramenopiles
- Division: Ochrophyta
- Class: Phaeophyceae
- Order: Laminariales
- Family: Laminariaceae
- Genus: Saccharina
- Species: S. latissima

Binomial name
- Saccharina latissima (L.) C.E. Lane, C. Mayes, Druehl, et G. W. Saunders

Synonyms
- Fucus saccharinus L.; Laminaria saccharina (L.) Lamouroux

= Saccharina latissima =

Species of Phaeophyceae, type of kelp

Saccharina latissima is a brown alga (class Phaeophyceae), of the family Laminariaceae. It is known by the common names sugar kelp, sea belt, and Devil's apron, and is one of the species known to Japanese cuisine as kombu. It is found in the north Atlantic Ocean, Arctic Ocean and north Pacific Ocean.

== Description ==
Saccharina latissima is a yellowish brown colour with a long narrow, undivided blade that can grow to 5 metres (16 ft) long and 20 centimetres (8 in) wide. The central band is dimpled while the margins are smoother with a wavy edge; this is to cause greater water movement around the blades to aid in gas exchange. The frond is attached to rock by stout rhizoids about 5 mm (0.20 in) in diameter in the intertidal and sublittoral zones, by a claw-like holdfast and a short, pliable, cylindrical stipe.

== Distribution and habitat ==
It is found in the North Atlantic Ocean, Arctic Ocean and North Pacific Ocean. It is common along the coast of Northern Europe as far south as Galicia Spain. In North America, it is found on the East Coast down to Long Island, although it historically extended down to New Jersey and on the West Coast down to the state of Washington. On the coast of Asia, it is found south to Korea and Japan.

== Ecology ==
Saccharina latissima is an ecologically important system. It is a primary producer, delivering plant material to the coastal food web. The three-dimensional forests also serve as a habitat for animals, resulting in a high biodiversity. Fish, shellfish and other animals find food and hiding places within these forests.

It can be infected by the pathogenic fungus (to kelp) Phycomelaina laminariae.

== Threats ==
In 2004, scientists reported a loss in sugar kelp of up to 80% at Skagerrak and 40% at the west coast of Norway. The reasons for this loss are not fully understood, but the increase in ocean temperature, high levels of nutrients and the reduction in animal species feeding off the filamentous algae are suggested as the most likely reasons.

== Uses ==
Sugar kelp is used as a food in many places where it grows, one of many species often called kombu. Sugar kelp can be used as a vegetable in salads but is most frequently used in soups and stocks where it provides savory flavors and is especially highly valued in vegetarian cooking. Kombu is a key component of miso soup. The savory flavor of sugar kelp comes from free amino acids like glutamate. Monosodium glutamate was first isolated from Saccharina. Sugar kelp gets its name due to it containing the sugar alcohol mannitol which is extracted from it to be used as a sugar substitute, especially for chewing gum. Isle of Harris distillery on Lewis used the kelp as a flavouring in its gin.

== Gallery ==
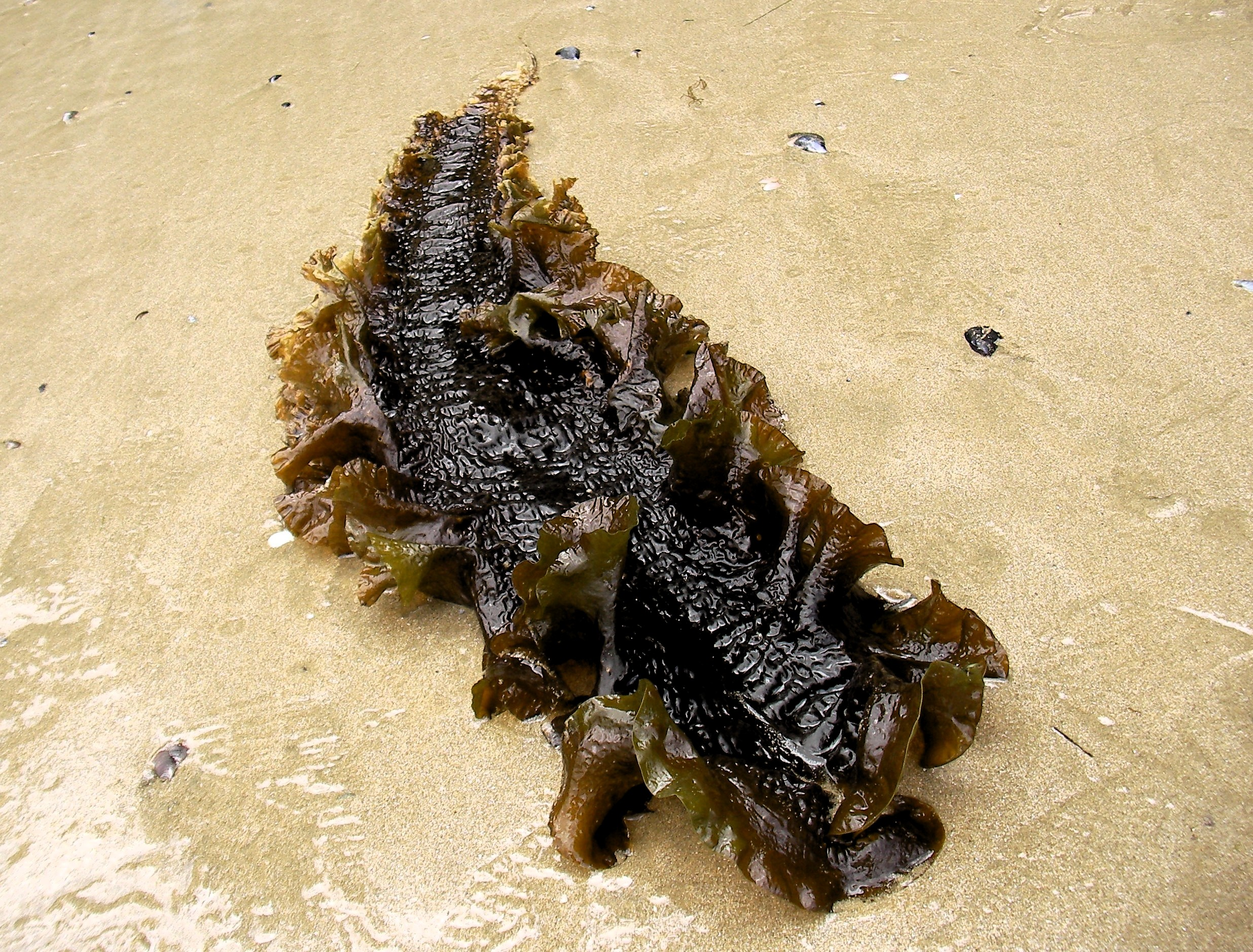

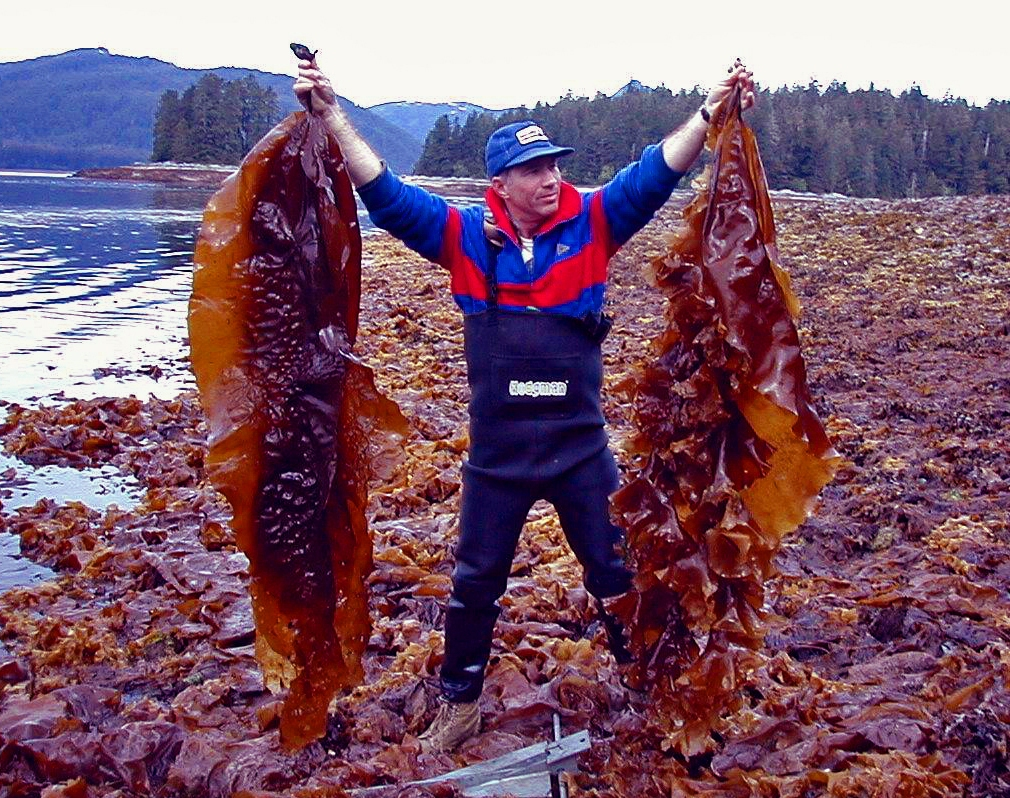
Saccharina latissima on a beach

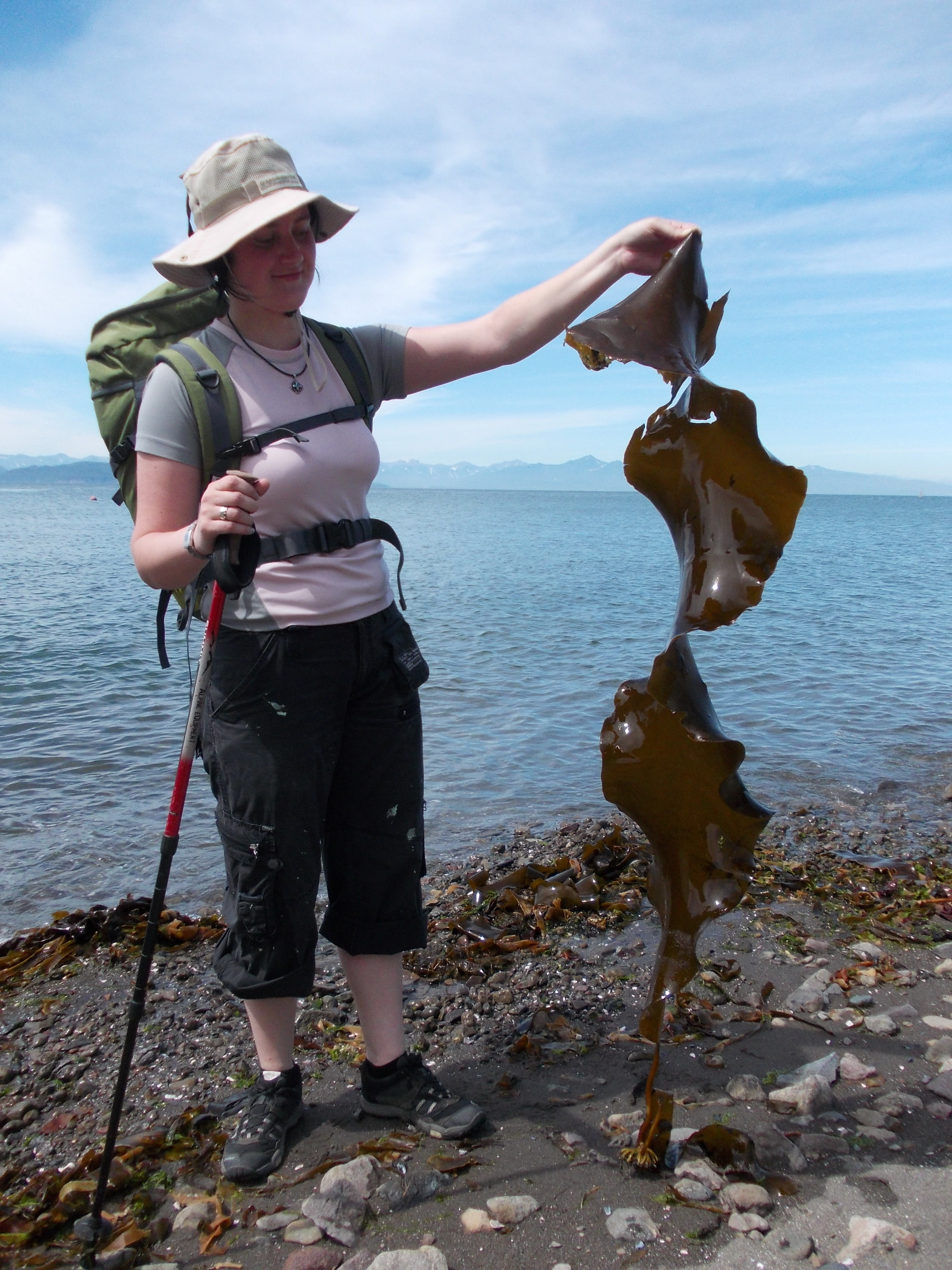
Saccharina lattissima from Avacha Bay
