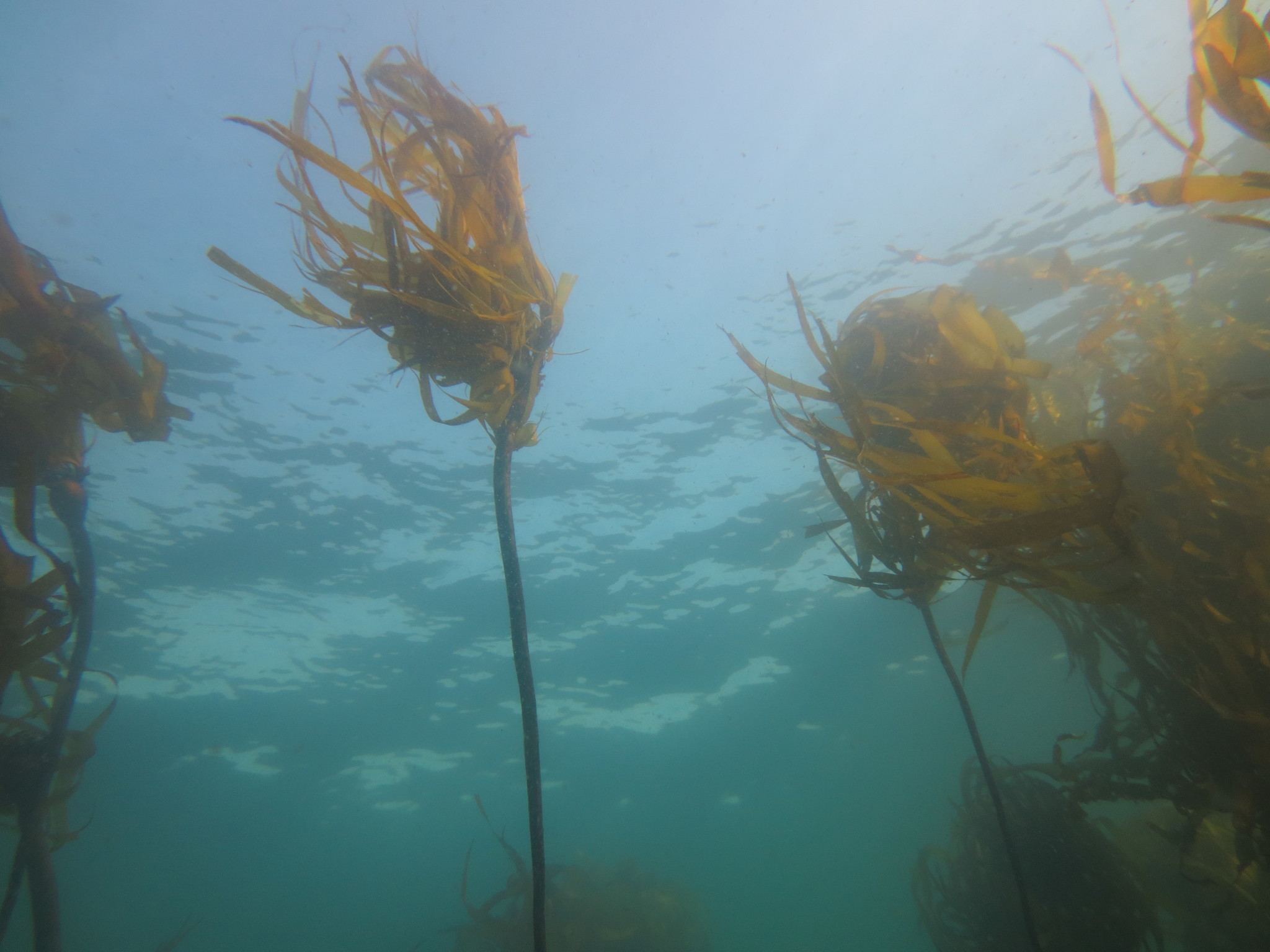
- Nereocystis luetkeana at Caspar Point, California

Scientific classification
- Domain: Eukaryota
- Supergroup: Stramenopiles
- Division: Ochrophyta
- Class: Phaeophyceae
- Order: Laminariales
- Family: Laminariaceae
- Genus: Nereocystis; Postels & Ruprecht
- Species: N. luetkeana

Binomial name
- Nereocystis luetkeana (K.Mertens) Postels & Ruprecht

= Nereocystis =

Genus of kelp

Nereocystis (Greek, 'mermaid's bladder') is a monotypic genus of subtidal kelp containing the species Nereocystis luetkeana. Some English names include edible kelp, bull kelp, bullwhip kelp, ribbon kelp, and variations of these names. Due to the English name, bull kelp can be confused with southern bull kelps, which are found in the Southern Hemisphere. Nereocystis luetkeana forms thick beds on subtidal rocks, and is an important part of kelp forests.

== Etymology ==
The species Nereocystis luetkeana was named (as Fucus luetkeanus) after the German-Russian explorer Fyodor Petrovich Litke (also spelled Lütke) by Mertens. The species was renamed in a description by Postels and Ruprecht.

== Description ==
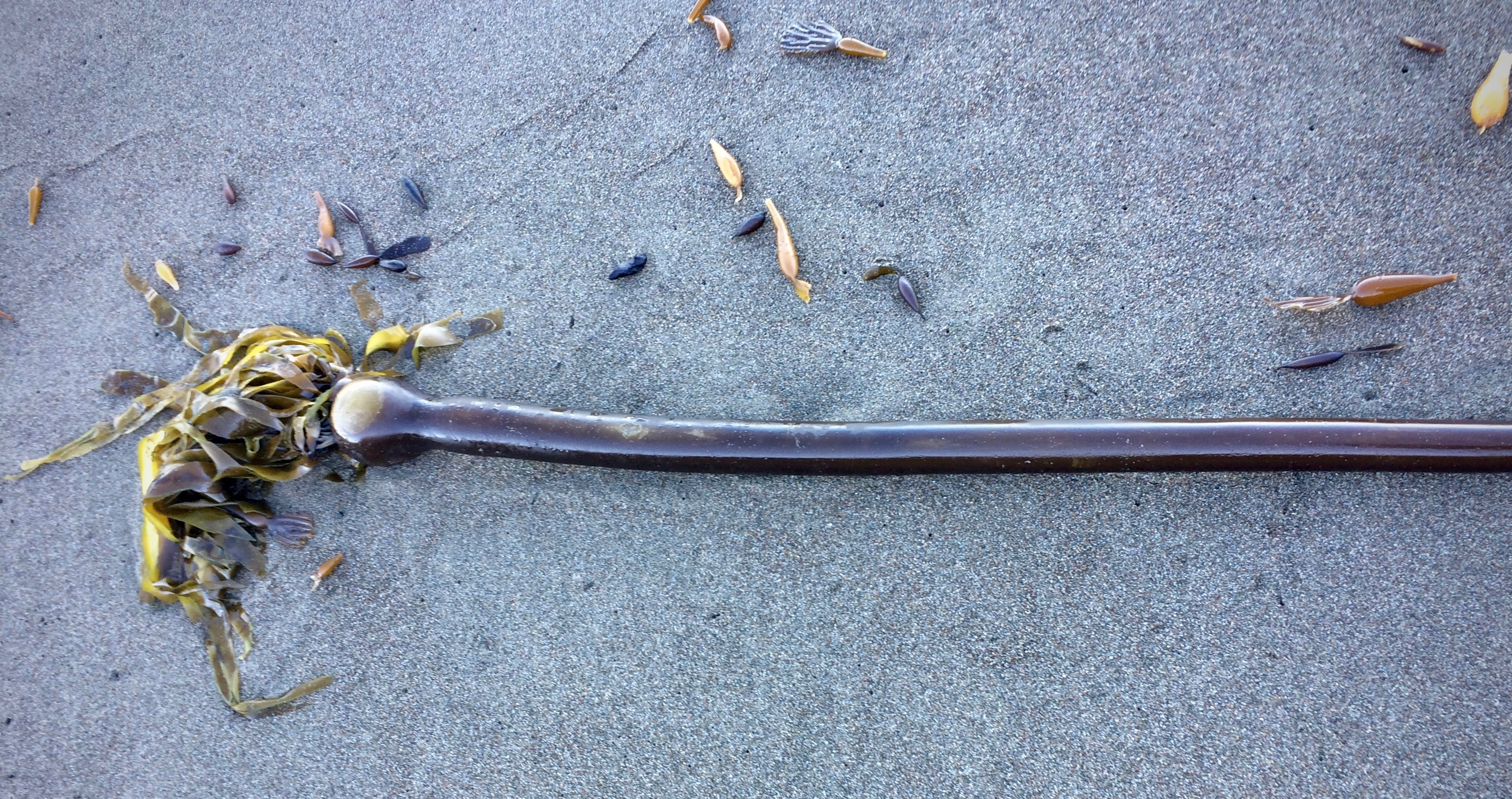
Bull kelp near Cambria, California. Top of stipe, pneumatocyst and blades shown on this freshly washed-ashore specimen. Also note nearby fragments of Macrocystis on this gray sand beach. October 2017 photo.

Nereocystis is a brown macroalgae that derives chemical energy from photosynthesis. Nereocystis in particular, similar to Pelagophycus porra, can be identified by a single large pneumatocyst (gas bladder) between the end of its hollow stipe and the blades. Individuals can grow to a maximum of 36 m (118 ft). Nereocystis has a holdfast up to about 40 cm (16 in), and a single stipe, topped with a pneumatocyst, containing some carbon monoxide (for which there is no known present-day function for the organism), from which sprout the numerous (about 30-64) blades. The blades may be up to 4 m (13 ft) long, and up to 15 cm (5.9 in) wide. It is usually annual, sometimes persisting up to 18 months. Nereocystis is the only kelp which will drop spore patches, so that the right concentration of spores lands near the parent's holdfast.

The thallus of this common canopy-forming kelp has a richly branched holdfast (haptera) and a cylindrical stipe 10–36 m (33–118 ft) long. The stipe terminates in a single, gas-filled pneumatocyst from which many blades grow. Each blade can grow up to 10 m (33 ft) long, and blade growth can reach 15 cm (5.9 in) per day.

Nereocystis often grows in areas where Pterygophora californica inhabits. Bull kelp will often grow on the stipe of Pterygophora, with up anywhere from 10 to 20 individuals of Nereocystis attaching to a single Pterygophora stipe.

=== Reproduction ===
Reproduction in Nereocystis is characterized by an alternation of generations. The diploid generation is the recognizable macroscopic sporophyte. During sexual reproduction, reproductive patches (sori) develop on the blades of the sporophyte and drop to the seafloor at maturity. The sori release haploid spores, which become the microscopic gametophytes. The gametophytes produce gametes, and after fertilization occurs, a new sporophyte organism develops and grows upward from the seafloor.

== Distribution ==
The species is common along the Pacific Coast of North America, from Southern California to the Aleutian Islands, Alaska. However, drift individuals disperse with ocean currents further south into northwest Baja California, Mexico. Offshore beds can persist for one or many years, usually in deeper water than Eualaria or Macrocystis, where they co-occur.

This annual kelp grows on rock from the low intertidal to subtidal zones; it prefers semi-exposed habitats or high-current areas. It also does not grow in areas with breaking waves or swells. Its distribution is limited by the requirement of light for photosynthesis, and preference for areas of high water movement where the microscopic gametophyte stage will not be covered by sediment.

Other factors such as salinity, turbidity and water temperature can affect Nereocystis distribution. Nereocystis tends to thrive in temperatures ranging from 5 to 20 degrees Celsius. It is rarely found in environments with high turbidity and low salinity. Nereocystis fails to thrive in areas of reduced salinity, such as brackish estuarine waters, because it has difficulty adjusting to changes in salinity. The increased turbidity of such waters also decreases light available for photosynthesis, limiting its growth. Additionally, disease, competition, and herbivory can affect distribution.

== Ecology ==
Nereocystis, like other large, canopy forming kelps, play a crucial role in maintaining the biologically diverse kelp forests in the temperate marine environments where they flourish. Its fast growth and size provide an important habitat not only for the fish and invertebrates that reside in kelp forests, but also for species that use kelp forests as foraging grounds. In bull kelp forests, kelp crabs are important grazers that control the ecosystem by feeding on large canopy kelps such as Nereocystis.

=== Microbial communities ===
Nereocystis fosters microbacteria species, affecting the ecology on a microscopic level. These microbial bacteria species foster the growth of seaweed, producing growth-promoting substances. According to studies by Weigel, the microbial communities that grow on Nereocystis are composed mostly of Proteobacteria, Bacteroidetes, Verrucomicrobia, and Planctomycetes. Nereocystis is unique in that it contains a large percentage of Verrucomicrobia, with it composing approximately 10% of microbacteria populations on Nereocystis.

=== Human effects ===
Abalone mariculture (the commercial farming and harvest of abalone) and an increasing demand in human consumption have led to a notable and marked increase in Nereocystis extraction. This extraction is done by hand and removes the top two meters of the forest. These first two meters contain bull kelp's pneumatocysts and its reproductive organs, so this method of extraction destroys kelp forests that depend on Nereocystis. Since bull kelp tend to only reproduce once a year, removal of these organs renders Nereocystis unable to reproduce. The tissues of bull kelp are processed and turned into liquid fertilizer as well as food for abalones.

== Human uses ==
Nereocystis was not commercially harvested off the coast of California until around the 1980s. The beginning of this harvest is attributed to the Abalone International company, which was seeking mariculture expansion and efficiency. Kelp harvesters are legally mandated to record every aspect of their harvest, including but not limited to the amount of kelp, the species, and the location where it was taken from. Kelp is currently harvested from the Californian coast, Oregon, Washington, British Columbia, and Alaska.

Human uses of Nereocystis include consumption and agriculture. It is pickled and eaten as a delicacy as well as used for creative purposes.
