= List of threatened ecological communities declared by the Commonwealth of Australia =

List of threatened ecological communities

This is a list of threatened ecological communities declared by the Commonwealth of Australia under the Environment Protection and Biodiversity Conservation Act 1999 ("EPBC Act"), and listed in the Species Profile and Threats Database (SPRAT).

== New South Wales and the Australian Capital Territory ==
listed at SPRAT.

- Blue Gum High Forest in the Sydney Basin
- Brigalow (Acacia harpophylla dominant and co-dominant)
- Buloke Woodlands of the Riverina and Murray-Darling Depression Bioregions
- Castlereagh Scribbly Gum and Agnes Banks Woodlands of the Sydney Basin Bioregion
- Central Hunter Valley eucalypt forest and woodland
- Coastal Swamp Oak (Casuarina glauca) Forest of New South Wales and South East Queensland ecological community
- Coastal Upland Swamps in the Sydney Basin Bioregion
- Cooks River/Castlereagh Ironbark Forest of the Sydney Basin Bioregion
- Coolibah - Black Box Woodlands of the Darling Riverine Plains and the Brigalow Belt South Bioregions
- Cumberland Plain Shale Woodlands and Shale-Gravel Transition Forest
- Eastern Suburbs Banksia Scrub of the Sydney Region
- Grey Box (Eucalyptus microcarpa) Grassy Woodlands and Derived Native Grasslands of South-eastern Australia
- Hunter Valley Weeping Myall (Acacia pendula) Woodland
- Illawarra and south coast lowland forest and woodland ecological community
- Littoral Rainforest and Coastal Vine Thickets of Eastern Australia
- Lowland Grassy Woodland in the South East Corner Bioregion
- Natural Grasslands of the Murray Valley Plains
- New England Peppermint (Eucalyptus nova-anglica) Woodlands
- Posidonia australis seagrass meadows of the Manning-Hawkesbury ecoregion
- Shale/Sandstone Transition Forest
- Southern Highlands Shale Forest and Woodland in the Sydney Basin Bioregion
- Subtropical and Temperate Coastal Saltmarsh
- Temperate Highland Peat Swamps on Sandstone
- Turpentine – Ironbark Forest in the Sydney Basin Bioregion
- Upland Wetlands of the New England Tablelands & the Monaro Plateau
- Warkworth Sands Woodland of the Hunter Valley
- Weeping Myall – Coobah – Scrub Wilga of the Hunter Valley (WM-C-SW)
- Weeping Myall Woodlands
- White Box-Yellow Box-Blakely's Red Gum Grassy Woodland and Derived Native Grassland
- Western Sydney Dry Rainforest and Moist Woodland on Shale

== Northern Territory ==
listed at SPRAT

- Arnhem Plateau Sandstone Shrubland Complex

== Queensland ==
listed at SPRAT

- Brigalow (Acacia harpophylla dominant and co-dominant)
- Broad leaf tea-tree (Melaleuca viridiflora) Woodlands in High Rainfall Coastal North Queensland Littoral Rainforest and Coastal Vine Thickets of Eastern Australia
- Mabi Forest (Complex Notophyll Vine Forest 5b)
- The community of native species dependent on natural discharge of groundwater from the Great Artesian Basin
- Weeping Myall Woodlands
- White Box-Yellow Box-Blakely's Red Gum Grassy Woodland and Derived Native Grassland
- Coastal Swamp Oak (Casuarina glauca) Forest of New South Wales and South East Queensland ecological community
- Subtropical and Temperate Coastal Saltmarsh
- Coolibah - Black Box Woodlands of the Darling Riverine Plains and the Brigalow Belt South Bioregions
- Lowland Rainforests of Subtropical Australia
- Natural Grasslands of the Queensland Central Highlands and the northern Fitzroy Basin
- Natural grasslands on basalt and fine-textured alluvial plains of northern New South Wales and southern Queensland
- New England Peppermint (Eucalyptus nova-anglica) Woodlands
- Semi-evergreen vine thickets of the Brigalow Belt (North and South) and Nandewar Bioregions
- Swamp Tea-tree (Melaleuca irbyana) Forest of South-east Queensland

== South Australia ==
listed at SPRAT

- Buloke Woodlands of the Riverina and Murray-Darling Depression Bioregions
- Giant Kelp Marine Forests of South East Australia
- Grey Box (Eucalyptus microcarpa) Grassy Woodlands and Derived Native Grasslands of South-eastern Australia
- Iron-grass Natural Temperate Grassland of South Australia
- Peppermint Box (Eucalyptus odorata) Grassy Woodland of South Australia
- Seasonal Herbaceous Wetlands (Freshwater) of the Temperate Lowland Plains
- Swamps of the Fleurieu Peninsula
- The community of native species dependent on natural discharge of groundwater from the Great Artesian Basin
- Eyre Peninsula Blue Gum (Eucalyptus petiolaris) Woodland
- Kangaroo Island Narrow-leaved Mallee (Eucalyptus cneorifolia) Woodland
- Subtropical and Temperate Coastal Saltmarsh
- White Box-Yellow Box-Blakely's Red Gum Grassy Woodland and Derived Native Grassland

== Tasmania ==
listed at SPRAT

- Alpine Sphagnum Bogs and Associated Fens
- Eucalyptus ovata - Callitris oblonga Forest
- Giant Kelp Marine Forests of South East Australia
- Lowland Native Grasslands of Tasmania
- Subtropical and Temperate Coastal Saltmarsh

== Victoria ==
listed at SPRAT

- Alpine Sphagnum Bogs and Associated Fens
- Buloke Woodlands of the Riverina and Murray-Darling Depression Bioregions
- Giant Kelp Marine Forests of South East Australia
- Gippsland Red Gum (Eucalyptus tereticornis subsp. mediana) Grassy Woodland and Associated Native Grassland
- Grassy Eucalypt Woodland of the Victorian Volcanic Plain
- Grey Box (Eucalyptus microcarpa) Grassy Woodlands and Derived Native Grasslands of South-eastern Australia
- Littoral Rainforest and Coastal Vine Thickets of East Australia
- Natural Grasslands of the Murray Valley Plains
- Natural Temperate Grassland of the Victorian Volcanic Plain
- NRM Regions
- Seasonal Herbaceous Wetlands (Freshwater) of the Temperate Lowland Plains
- Silurian Limestone Pomaderris Shrubland of the South East Corner and Australian Alps Bioregions (SLPS)
- White Box-Yellow Box-Blakely's Red Gum Grassy Woodland and Derived Native Grassland
- Natural Damp Grassland of the Victorian Coastal Plains
- Natural Temperate Grassland of the South Eastern Highlands
- Subtropical and Temperate Coastal Saltmarsh

== Western Australia ==
listed at SPRAT

- Aquatic Root Mat Community 1 in Caves of the Leeuwin Naturaliste Ridge
- Thrombolite (microbial) community of coastal freshwater lakes of the Swan Coastal Plain (Lake Richmond)
- Aquatic Root Mat Community 2 in Caves of the Leeuwin Naturaliste Ridge
- Aquatic Root Mat Community 3 in Caves of the Leeuwin Naturaliste Ridge
- Aquatic Root Mat Community 4 in Caves of the Leeuwin Naturaliste Ridge
- Aquatic Root Mat Community in Caves of the Swan Coastal Plain
- Eastern Stirling Range Montane Heath and Thicket
- Perched Wetlands of the Wheatbelt region with extensive stands of living sheoak and paperbark across the lake floor (Toolibin Lake)
- Assemblages of plants and invertebrate animals of tumulus (organic mound) springs of the Swan Coastal Plain
- Corymbia calophylla - Kingia australis woodlands on heavy soils of the Swan Coastal Plain
- Corymbia calophylla - Xanthorrhea preissii woodlands and shrublands of the Swan Coastal Plain
- Sedgelands in Holocene dune swales of the southern Swan Coastal Plain
- Shrublands and Woodlands of the eastern Swan Coastal Plain
- Shrublands and Woodlands on Muchea Limestone of the Swan Coastal Plain
- Shrublands and Woodlands on Perth to Gingin ironstone (Perth to Gingin ironstone association) of the Swan Coastal Plain
- Shrublands on southern Swan Coastal Plain ironstones
- Thrombolite (microbialite) Community of a Coastal Brackish Lake (Lake Clifton)
- Claypans of the Swan Coastal Plain
- Monsoon vine thickets on the coastal sand dunes of Dampier Peninsula
- Banksia Woodlands of the Swan Coastal Plain ecological community
- Eucalypt Woodlands of the Western Australian Wheatbelt
- Proteaceae Dominated Kwongan Shrublands of the Southeast Coastal Floristic Province of Western Australia
- Scott River Ironstone Association
- Subtropical and Temperate Coastal Saltmarsh
