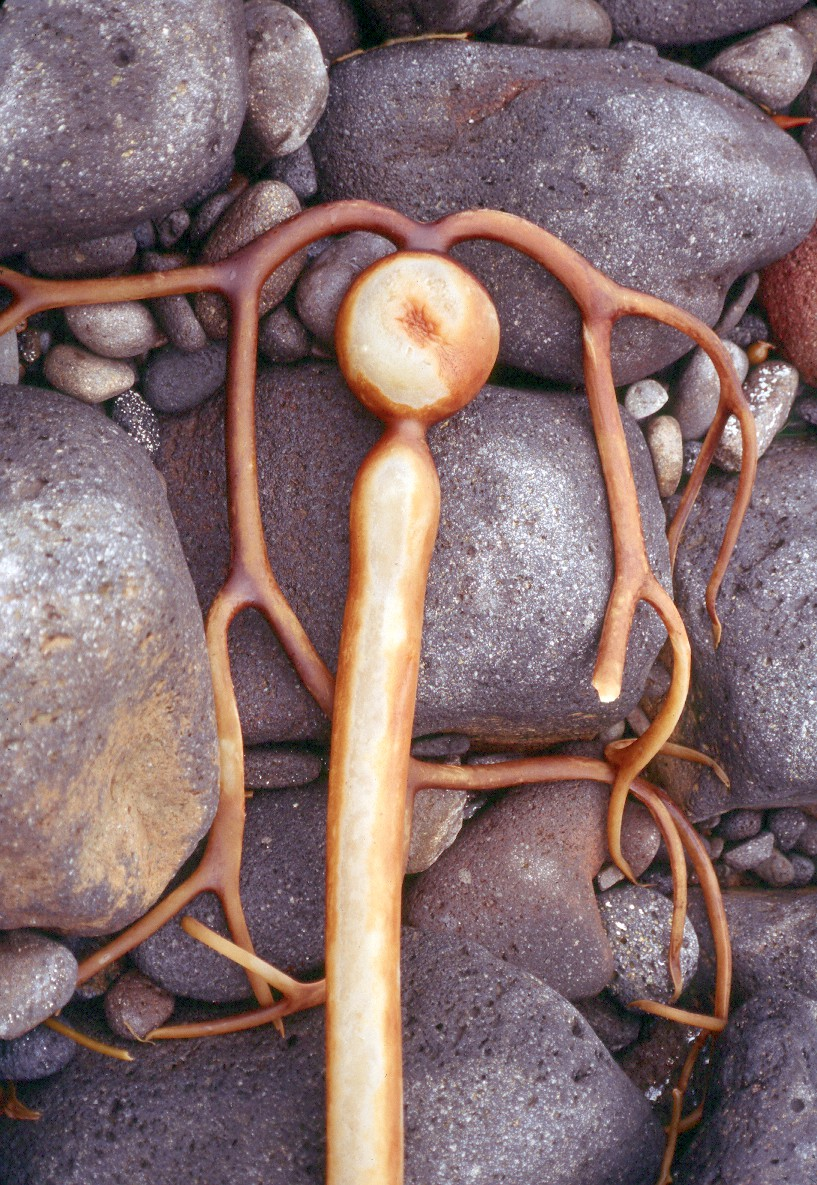
- Pelagophycus porra washed up on San Clemente Island

Scientific classification
- Domain: Eukaryota
- Supergroup: Stramenopiles
- Division: Ochrophyta
- Class: Phaeophyceae
- Order: Laminariales
- Family: Laminariaceae
- Genus: Pelagophycus; Areschoug, 1881
- Species: P. porra

Binomial name
- Pelagophycus porra (Léman) Setchell

Synonyms
- Pelagophycus giganteus Areschoug, 1881; Pelagophycus intermedius Parker & Bleck, 1965

= Pelagophycus =

Genus of Phaeophyceae

Pelagophycus is a monotypic genus of kelp. It is found in deep waters off the west coast of central North America. The species Pelagophycus porra, also known as elk kelp, grows in temperatures of no higher than 60 °F (16 °C).

It grows in subtidal forests in the coastal waters off southern California and northwestern Baja California Peninsula, in waters of 20 metres (66 ft) to 90 metres (300 ft) deep, and is anchored by a holdfast in sedimentary or loose sediment bottoms. Hybrids of this species with Macrocystis and Dictyoneuropsis are known.
