= Environment Protection and Biodiversity Conservation Act 1999 =

Environmental law in Australia

Parliament of Australia
- Long title: An Act relating to the protection of the environment and the conservation of biodiversity, and for related purposes
- Citation: Environment Protection and Biodiversity Conservation Act 1999 (Cth) No. 91 of 1999
- Territorial extent: States and territories of Australia
- Enacted by: Parliament of Australia
- Enacted: 16 July 2000
- Assented to by: Governor-General Sir William Deane
- Assented to: 16 July 1999
- Commenced: 16 July 2000
- Administered by: Department of Agriculture, Water and the Environment

Legislative history
- Introduced by: Bill Heffernan, Ian Campbell
- First reading: 31 March 1999
- Second reading: 31 March 1999
- Status: Amended

The Environment Protection and Biodiversity Conservation Act 1999 (Cth) is an act of the Parliament of Australia that provides a framework for protection of the Australian environment, including its biodiversity and its natural and culturally significant places. Enacted on 16 July 2000, it established a range of processes to help protect and promote the recovery of threatened species and ecological communities, and preserve significant places from decline. The act is as of September 2024 administered by the Department of Climate Change, Energy, the Environment and Water. Lists of threatened species are drawn up under the act, and these lists, the primary reference to threatened species in Australia, are available online through the Species Profile and Threats Database (SPRAT).

As an act of the Australian Parliament, it relies for its constitutional validity upon the legislative powers of the Parliament granted by the Australian Constitution, and key provisions of the act are largely based on a number of international, multilateral or bilateral treaties. A number of reviews, audits and assessments of the act have found the act deeply flawed and thus not providing adequate environmental protection.

== History ==
The Environment Protection and Biodiversity Conservation Act 1999 replaced the National Parks and Wildlife Conservation Act 1975, after this legislation was repealed by the Environmental Reform (Consequential Provisions) Act 1999. The Environmental Reform Act also repealed four other acts: Environment Protection (Impact of Proposals) Act 1974; Endangered Species Protection Act 1992; World Heritage Properties Conservation Act 1983; and the Whale Protection Act 1980. This Act also made consequential changes to other legislation, and various administrative arrangements, required by the new scheme introduced by the act.

The act received royal assent on 16 July 1999 and commenced on 16 July 2000.

The Environment Protection and Biodiversity Conservation Regulations 2000 also commenced on 16 July 2000, (with 21 amendments up to the latest on 17 December 2018). The purpose of the regulations is to give effect to the provisions of the act.

The legislation has had many amendments through its lifetime. Significant amendments include the following:

- The National Heritage List was established by an amendment in September 2003.
- Amendments passed in February 2007 aimed to make the act "more efficient and effective through the use of, in part, strategic approaches to environmental issues, reducing the time and cost of processing, and stronger enforcement provisions".
- Significant amendments to the act became law on 22 June 2013, known as the "Water trigger", making water resources a matter of national environmental significance, in relation to coal seam gas and large coal mining development.

On 16 October 2013 the environment minister announced that the government had approved a framework for a "one-stop shop" environmental approval process to accredit state planning systems under national environmental law, "to create a single environmental assessment and approval process for nationally protected matters". On 16 June 2014 the proposed amendments passed the House of Representatives, despite opposition from environmental campaigners and significant legal commentators who criticised the bill and expressed concerns about the delegation of Commonwealth environmental approval powers. Two different types of bilateral agreements ("assessment" and "approval") with each state and territory provided for the approvals process, depending on differing requirements, to result in either two approval decisions and two sets of conditions, or only one decision, which includes conditions (if appropriate), being made.

== The act ==
The act established the use of Environment Protection and Biodiversity Conservation Regulations, which have provided for the issuing of approvals and permits for a range of activities on Commonwealth land and land affecting the Commonwealth. For example, commercial picking of wildflowers is regulated under the act, and cannot be undertaken without an appropriate permit. Failure to comply with the act can result in penalties including remediation of damage, court injunctions, and criminal and civil penalties.

As of September 2024, the legislation is administered by the Department of Climate Change, Energy, the Environment and Water.

=== Matters of National Environmental Significance ===
As of 2020, the act identifies nine Matters of National Environmental Significance (MNES):

- World Heritage properties
- National heritage places including overseas places of historic significance
- Wetlands of international importance (Ramsar wetlands)
- Nationally threatened species and ecological communities
- Migratory species
- Commonwealth marine areas
- The Great Barrier Reef Marine Park
- Nuclear actions (including uranium mining and building of nuclear waste repositories)
- A water resource, in relation to coal seam gas development and large coal mining development.

The list must be reviewed every five years, and the government can add new matters to this list by regulation. "If a proposed action is likely to have a significant impact on any of the areas, it may require Commonwealth approval before it can begin. It is illegal to undertake such an action without that Commonwealth approval." The Matters of National Environmental Significance: Significant impact guidelines 1.1 "provide overarching guidance on determining whether an action is likely to have a significant impact on a matter protected under national environment law".

=== Threatened species ===
Lists of threatened species, such as threatened fauna, are drawn up under the act and these lists are the primary reference to threatened species in Australia and are available online through the Species Profile and Threats Database (SPRAT).

=== Treaties ===
As an act of the Australian Parliament, it relies for its Constitutional validity upon the legislative powers of the Parliament granted by the Australian Constitution, which does not expressly refer to the environment. As such, key provisions of the act are largely based on a number of treaties including:

- Ramsar Convention – The Convention on Wetlands of International Importance especially as Waterfowl Habitat, 2 February 1971
- World Heritage Convention – The Convention for the Protection of the World Cultural and Natural Heritage, 23 November 1972
- Convention on International Trade in Endangered Species of Wild Fauna and Flora (CITES) – Washington, DC, 3 March 1973 (enforced 1 July 1975)
- Convention on the Conservation of Migratory Species of Wild Animals (Bonn Convention), 23 June 1979
- Convention on Biological Diversity – Rio de Janeiro, 5 June 1992

Bilateral agreements concerning migratory bird conservation include:

- Agreement between the Government of Japan and the Government of Australia for the Protection of Migratory Birds and Birds in Danger of Extinction and their Environment (JAMBA), 1974
- Agreement between the Government of Australia and the Government of the People's Republic of China for the protection of Migratory Birds and their Environment (CAMBA), 1986
- Agreement between the Government of Australia and the Government of the Republic of Korea on the Protection of Migratory Birds (ROKAMBA), 2006.

== Amendments ==
=== 2012 ===
The Environment Protection and Biodiversity Conservation Amendment (Independent Expert Scientific Committee on Coal Seam Gas and Large Coal Mining Development) Act 2012, assented to in October 2012, amended the act to require that the "Minister must obtain advice from Independent Expert Scientific Committee on Coal Seam Gas and Large Coal Mining Development".

=== 2013 ===
Significant impacts on MNES trigger assessment under the act. A new assessment trigger was added to the act in mid-2013, via the Environment Protection and Biodiversity Conservation Amendment Act 2013. The amendment relates to significant impacts on water resources, for example where actions by a large coal mining development, in particular coal seam gas may adversely affect groundwater in the area. The amendment was introduced by Tony Windsor, an independent Member of Parliament (MP). This became known as "water trigger".

As of March 2020, the Australian Conservation Foundation is taking the Morrison government to court for failing to apply the water trigger when it assessed Adani's North Galilee Water Scheme, part of its essential infrastructure for the proposed Carmichael coal mine.

=== 2020 ===
On 27 August 2020, the minister for the environment, Sussan Ley, introduced the Environment Protection and Biodiversity Conservation Amendment (Streamlining Environmental Approvals) Bill 2020 (EPBC Amendment Bill), which for the most part reflects reforms to the bilateral approval agreement provisions first proposed in 2014. The proposed changes would make it easier to establish bilateral approval agreements between federal and state governments, and also to make it harder to challenge the devolution process under the law (by clarifying that an action cannot be referred under part seven of the act if it is covered by a bilateral approval agreement. Other changes include allowing minor changes to state and territory assessment processes without impacting the bilateral agreement, and the prohibition on matters involving the "water trigger" will be removed, so that states can make their own decisions when assessing applications by large coal mines and coal seam gas projects that can impact water resources. The proposed changes do not include the promised prototype national standards.

=== 2025 ===
On 27 November 2025, the Albanese government struck a deal with the Greens in the Senate that allowed the passage of a new environmental act to replace this legislation. The new legislation aims to speed up approvals of projects including new energy developments and housing, create a new body called the Environment Protection Authority which can immediately order a business to stop work if it finds a breach of the rules. The government has also included $300 million to support jobs and maintain modern equipment in the forestry industry. The government also removed the exemption for high-risk land clearing and regional forestry agreements.

== Assessments ==
A large number of studies, audits, reviews and parliamentary inquiries have examined various aspects of the legislation over the years. Section 522A of the act requires that an independent review is conducted every ten years, to examine its operation and the extent to which its objects have been met.

A 2005 study looked specifically at threatened species recovery.

In 2006 Chris McGrath examined the constitutional validity of the act and its effectiveness at regulating non-compliance after two recent publications had called for major changes, concluding that it is indeed constitutionally valid and that it is making an important contribution to Australian environmental law, and its gains should be retained if and when any reforms are made.

=== 2007 audit ===
A review of the act and actions taken under the act was published by the Australian National Audit Office (ANAO) in March 2007, entitled "The Conservation and Protection of National Threatened Species and Ecological Communities". The audit widely criticised the Department of the Environment and Water Resources for inaction with respect to the EPBC; key findings of the audit include:

- that the department had failed to keep the list of threatened species sufficiently up to date and has failed to prepare recovery plans;
- that there were still inconsistencies between the federal and state and territory lists of threatened species;
- that due to partial or incorrect information there was a risk that incorrect decisions regarding conservation might be made; and
- that the department has been denied funds necessary to meet their obligations under the act by the government on four occasions.

Australian Greens leader Bob Brown said the audit showed that the government had not provided enough funding to properly protect Australia's endangered species of flora, fauna and ecological communities. He said that there were no plans to save three out of four threatened species.

=== 2008–2009 independent review ===
On 31 October 2008 Peter Garrett, the minister for the environment, heritage and the arts commissioned a ten-year review of the act.

The review was led by Dr Allan Hawke, supported by an expert panel. The aim of the report was to review the performance of the act and, consistent with the objective of protecting the environment and biological diversity and maintain ecological processes, to recommend reforms that:

- promote the sustainability of Australia's economic development
- reduce and simplify the regulatory burden
- ensure activities under the act represent the most efficient and effective ways of achieving desired environmental outcomes
- are based on an effective federal arrangement.

The "Final Report" was delivered to the Minister on 30 October 2009 and publicly released on 21 December 2009. In its summary, it said that public comments had been "broadly supportive" of the act, and that the act had brought about many important reforms, and in many respects was still regarded as world leading. However it included 71 recommendations, "summarised into a reform package revolving around a nine-point plan":

1. redraft the act to reflect better the Australian Government's role, streamline its arrangements and rename it the Australian Environment Act;
2. establish an independent Environment Commission to advise the government on project approvals, strategic assessments, bioregional plans and other statutory decisions;
3. invest in the building blocks of a better regulatory system such as national environmental accounts, skills development, policy guidance, and acquisition of critical spatial information;
4. streamline approvals through earlier engagement in planning processes and provide for more effective use and greater reliance on strategic assessments, bioregional planning and approvals bilateral agreements;
5. set up an Environment Reparation Fund and national 'biobanking' scheme;
6. provide for environmental performance audits and inquiries;
7. create a new matter of national environmental significance for 'ecosystems of national significance' and introduce an interim greenhouse trigger;
8. improve transparency in decision-making and provide greater access to the courts for public interest litigation; and
9. mandate the development of foresight reports to help government manage emerging environmental threats.

=== 2018 invertebrate studies ===
In 2018, two studies looked at the representativeness of listed species, and the other insects and allied invertebrates, proposing a new, strategic national approach for the conservation of these animals.

=== 2018 Guardian ===
A Guardian Australia investigation reported in March 2018 that Australia had not listed any critical habitat in the preceding ten years, and only five areas had been registered since the introduction of the act, although more than 1,800 species and ecological communities had been classed as threatened. A recent investigation had shown that Australia was planning to clear 3,000,000 hectares (7,400,000 acres) of native forest by 2030, much of it in Queensland. One weakness of the critical habitat register is that its offence provisions do not apply to state or private land, only to Commonwealth land. This had a big impact on the ability to name a critical habitat for the endangered Leadbeater's possum, whose habitat was mainly on state- and privately owned land.

=== 2019 assessment ===
A study by the Centre for Biodiversity and Conservation Science at the School at the University of Queensland was published in September 2019 as a "quantitative assessment on the effectiveness of the act in regulating the loss of habitat for terrestrial threatened species, threatened ecological communities, or terrestrial migratory species", as there had been little quantitative study in this area. It looked at whether the act as implemented was achieving its objective of safeguarding Australia's biodiversity with regard to regulating loss of habitat for threatened species and ecological communities between 2000 and 2017.

It showed that since the act came into force in 2000, over 7,700,000 hectares (19,000,000 acres) of potential habitat and communities had been cleared. Of this clearing, over 93% was not referred to the Federal Government for assessment, meaning the loss was not scrutinised under the act. While 1,390 (84%) species suffered loss, Mount Cooper striped skink, Keighery's macarthuria, and Southern black-throated finch lost 25, 23, and 10% of potential habitat, respectively. Iconic Australian species such as the koala, also lost about 1,000,000 hectares (2,500,000 acres) (2.3%) of potential habitat. This analysis showed that the act is ineffective at protecting potential habitat for terrestrial threatened species, terrestrial migratory species, or threatened ecological communities.

=== June 2020 audit ===
The 2020 audit was the sixth audit of referrals, assessments and approvals under the act. Published and tabled in Parliament on 25 June 2020, the report found that the administration of referrals, assessments and approvals of controlled actions under the act by the Department of Agriculture, Water and the Environment (DAWE) was ineffective, disproportionate to environmental risk, errors have occurred, procedural protocols have not been followed, and the Department is "not well positioned to measure its contribution to the objectives of the Act". The Auditor-General made eight recommendations to the Department. ANAO found that the Department did not have adequate performance measures in place; that administration had been poorly handled and that conflicts of interests were not well-managed.

DAWE responded to the audit, agreeing to all eight recommendations. The Secretary of DAWE, Andrew Metcalfe, also reported that the act was at the time undergoing an independent statutory review led by Professor Graeme Samuel AC, which was likely to result in legislative changes to the act.

James Tresize of the Australian Conservation Foundation commented that law was "fundamentally broken" and not equipped to deal with dual "extinction and climate crises", saying that Australia needs a stronger law and an independent regulator. He also pointed out that "in the 20 years the laws have been in operation, threatened species habitat greater in size than Tasmania has been logged and cleared".

=== 2019–2020 independent review ===
A statutory independent review led by Professor Graeme Samuel AC and supported by an expert panel commenced on 29 October 2019 and is due to run for a year. Submissions from the public closed in April 2020. The expert panel consists of Bruce Martin, Erika Smyth and Wendy Craik.

The interim report, released in July 2020, concluded that the laws created to protect unique species and habitats are ineffective, and the "current environmental trajectory is unsustainable". Criticism of the act included that it is too focused on process rather than on clear outcomes, and that its current ad hoc, "project-by-project" approach does not address cumulative harm. During its time in operation, "the list of threatened species and communities has increased over time and there have been very few species that have recovered to the point that they can be removed from the list". Among the changes the report proposes is a framework of legislated national environmental standards with legally enforceable rules, which would underpin all powers allocated to the states and territories. It recommends the establishment of an independent body "to monitor and enforce compliance with environmental laws". The report recommends that the federal government should start creating a set of interim standards initially, in consultation with state governments and all other stakeholders, and also a process whereby traditional knowledge of country by Indigenous Australians can be better integrated into decision-making.

The minister for the environment, Sussan Ley, said the government would immediately commit to developing national standards. She also indicated that it would start a process whereby responsibility for environmental approvals could be devolved to state governments, intending to put agreements before parliament in late August 2020, before the release of the final report, due in October. Environmental groups said it would be better to await the final report before cementing the approvals processes. Ley said the government would improve protection of Indigenous heritage, starting with a consultative process which would include state Indigenous and environment ministers.

On 14 August 2020, Andrew Barr, chief minister of the Australian Capital Territory, said that the legislation needed to be modernised to address climate change, which is not even mentioned in the current act.

=== 2025: North West Shelf expansion ===
The May 2025 approval to extend the life of the Karratha Gas Plant, part of the North West Shelf Project, beyond its 2030 termination date until 2070, brought more criticism of the EPBC Act. There had been calls to change the EPBC Act to include a climate trigger since at least 2005, when Prime Minister Anthony Albanese himself (then Shadow Environment Minister) proposed such a measure. The project has been one of Australia's biggest single emitters of greenhouse gases, and scientists and environmentalists said that the extra 45 years could add to up to six billion tonnes of greenhouse gases, the majority of which would be emitted after the gas was burned in countries to which it was exported. In addition, the plant is situated near to a 37,000-hectare (91,000-acre) natural gallery of over a million 50,000-year-old petroglyphs at Murujuga, a site of great cultural significance to local Aboriginal people.

== See also ==
- Director of National Parks
- List of Ramsar sites in Australia (wetlands)
- Natural Heritage Trust
- Regional Forest Agreement
- Threatened fauna of Australia
- List of threatened ecological communities declared by the Commonwealth of Australia

=== Related acts ===
- Natural Heritage Trust of Australia Act 1997, which established the Natural Heritage Trust and continues to provide funding for environmental programs through the National Landcare Program
- Biodiversity Conservation Act 2016 (NSW), New South Wales
- Biodiversity Conservation Act 2016 (WA), Western Australia
- Flora and Fauna Guarantee Act 1988 (FFG Act), Victoria
- National Parks and Wildlife Act 1972, South Australia
- Nature Conservation Act 2014, Australian Capital Territory
- Nature Conservation Act 1992, Queensland
- Territory Parks and Wildlife Conservation Act 1976 (TPWCA), Northern Territory
  - Environment Assessment Act 1982, Northern Territory
- Threatened Species Protection Act 1995 (TSP Act), Tasmania
- National Parks and Wildlife Act 1972, South Australia
