= Pneumatocyst =

Floating structure on brown seaweed

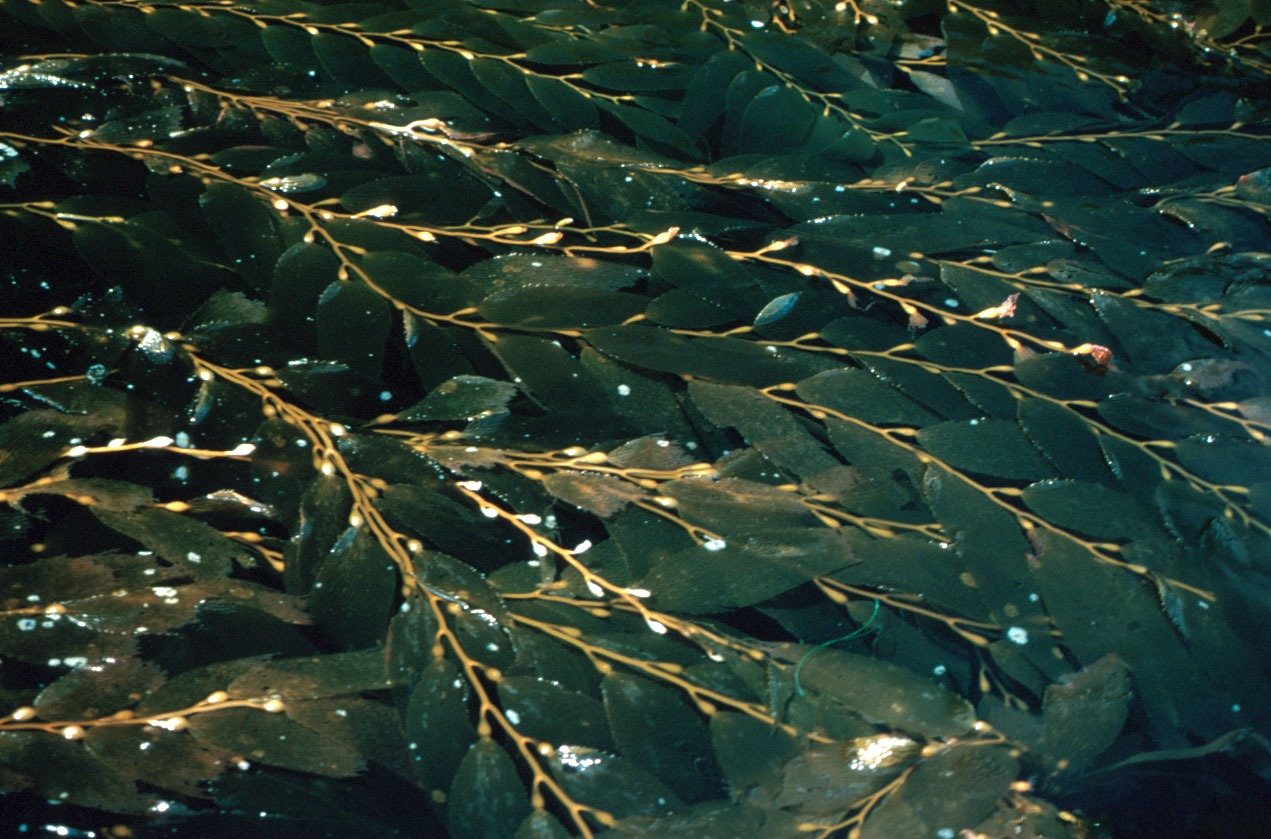
Floating kelp (Macrocystis pyrifera) with many pneumatocysts

In phycology, a pneumatocyst is a floating structure that contains gas found on brown seaweed. A seaweed's thallus may have more than one. They provide buoyancy to lift the blades toward the surface, allowing them to receive more sunlight for photosynthesis.

The proportion of gases in the pneumatocysts varies depending on the physiological status of the alga and the partial pressure of gases in the surrounding air or water. The pneumatocyst can hold O_{2}, CO_{2}, N_{2}, and CO.

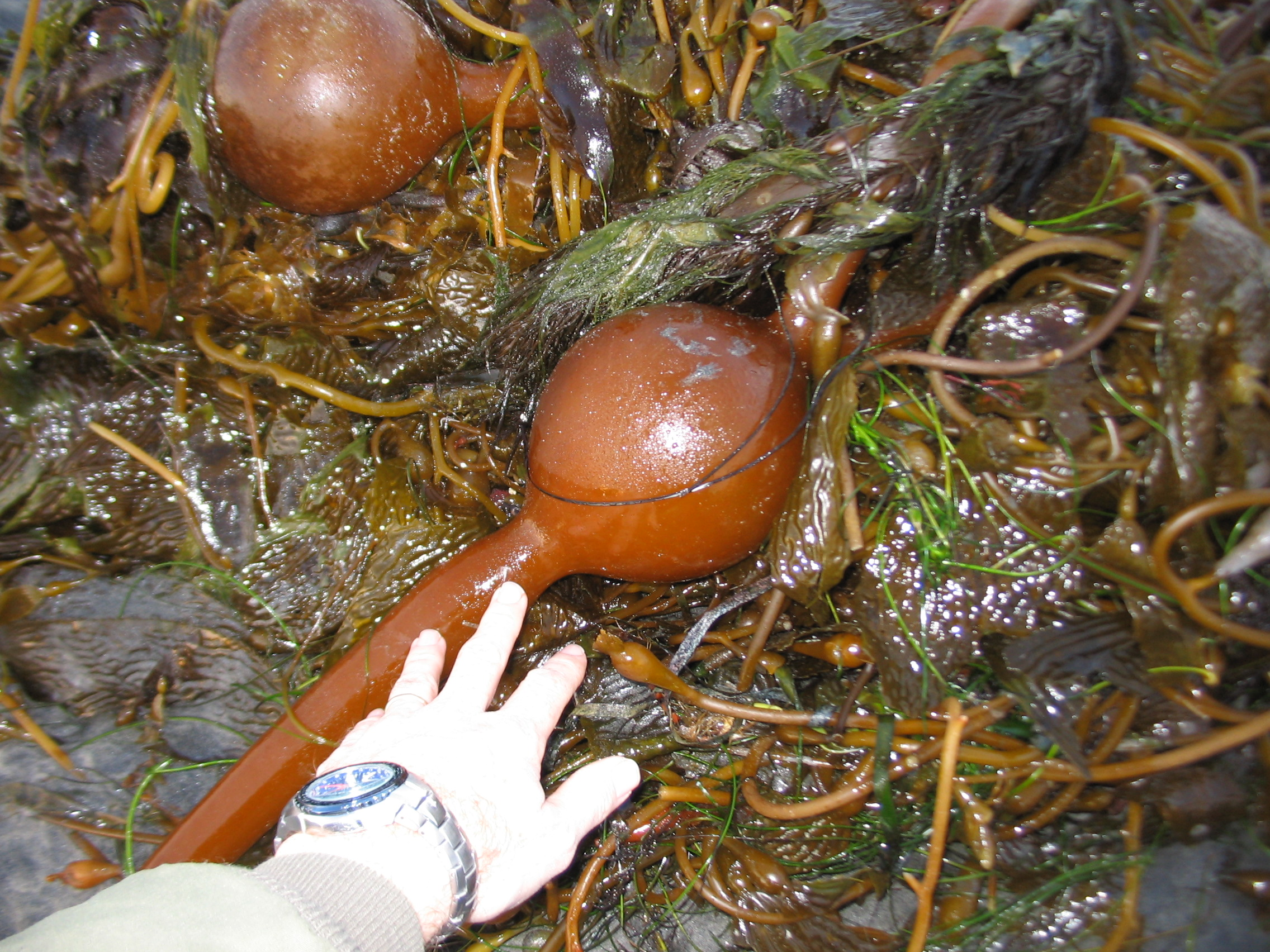
Pneumatocyst from Nereocystis luetkeana
