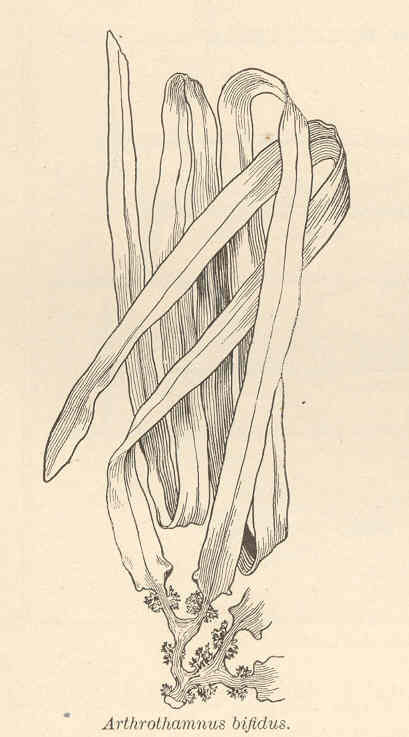
- Arthrothamnus bifidus

Scientific classification
- Domain: Eukaryota
- Clade: Diaphoretickes
- Clade: SAR
- Clade: Stramenopiles
- Phylum: Gyrista
- Subphylum: Ochrophytina
- Class: Phaeophyceae
- Order: Laminariales
- Family: Laminariaceae
- Genus: Arthrothamnus; Ruprecht, 1848

= Arthrothamnus =

Genus of seaweeds

Arthrothamnus is a genus of brown alga comprising approximately 2 species. It includes the algae commonly known as nekoashi-kombu, oarweed and chishima-nekoashi-kombu. Bifurcariopsis reproduces by means of conceptacles; it produces tetraspores and dispores and carpospores.

== Species ==
The two species currently recognised are Arthrothamnus bifidus and Arthrothamnus kurilensis.
