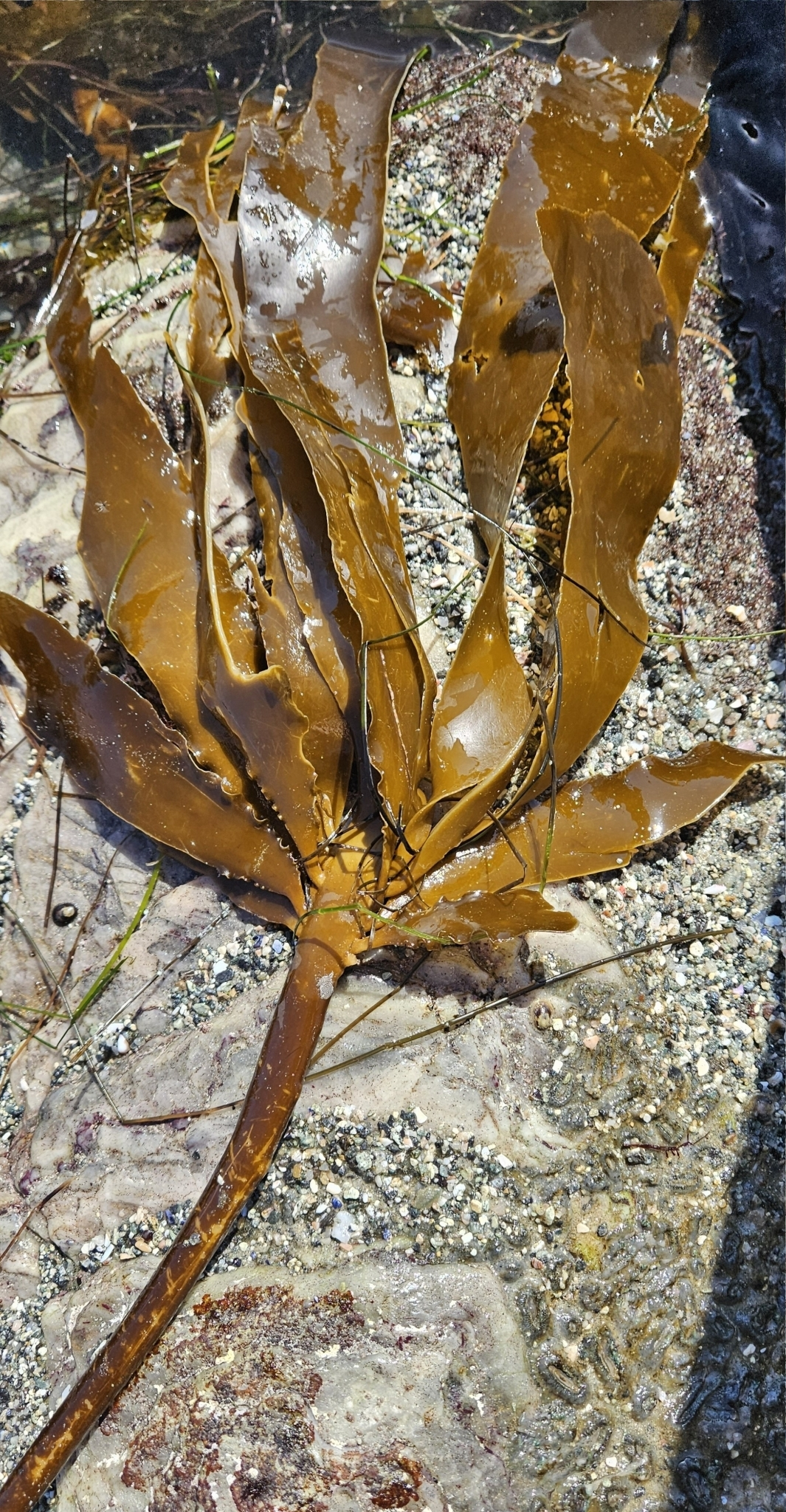

Scientific classification
- Domain: Eukaryota
- Supergroup: Stramenopiles
- Division: Ochrophyta
- Class: Phaeophyceae
- Order: Laminariales
- Family: Alariaceae
- Genus: Pterygophora; Rupr., 1852
- Species: P. californica

Binomial name
- Pterygophora californica Rupr., 1852

= Pterygophora californica =

Species of kelp

Pterygophora californica is a large species of kelp, commonly known as stalked kelp. It is the only species in its genus Pterygophora (Ruprecht, 1852). It grows in shallow water on the Pacific coast of North America where it forms part of a biodiverse community in a "kelp forest". It is sometimes also referred to as woody-stemmed kelp, walking kelp, or winged kelp.

== Description ==
Pterygophora californica is a large brown seaweed and may grow to about three metres in height. It is attached to a rocky substrate by its holdfast and has a single, tough, woody stipe or stem up to two metres long and 2 cm (0.8 in) in diameter. It is a long-lived perennial algae which may survive for twenty-five years, and annual growth rings can be seen in the stipe. There are a number of smooth blades arranged on either side of the top half of the stipe. These are sporophylls and bear reproductive organs called sporangia in which the spores are formed. The terminal blade is linear, has a midrib and is larger than the others, growing up to 90 cm (33 in) long.

== Distribution ==
Pterygophora californica is found in the sublittoral zone of the west coast of North America from Vancouver Island, British Columbia south to Bahía Rosario, Baja California, Mexico at depths down to about ten metres.

== Biology ==
Reproduction in P. californica involves an alternation of generations. Microscopic zoospores are produced in the sporangia. After release, these settle on the sea bed and develop into haploid gametophytes. These produce male and female gametes the fertilisation of which results in zygote formation and the growth of the diploid sporophytes, the stipe and blades. The stalked kelp has a woody stipe, and its age can be estimated (± 2 years) by counting its rings, similar to a terrestrial tree.

== Ecology ==
Pterygophora californica grows in underwater kelp forests with other brown algae including the annual bull kelp (Nereocystis luetkeana) and the perennial giant kelp (Macrocystis pyrifera). It is a dominant understory kelp species in these kelp forests, and creates a sub-surface canopy. Brown seaweeds are photosynthetic organisms and their growth is mainly restricted by the availability of light. P. californica can be restricted in its growth by shading from bull and giant kelp canopies. Various algae try to get a head start by attaching themselves to P. californica well above the ocean floor; this strategy is known as epiphyty. These include red algae (Rhodophyte spp.), bull kelp (Nereocystis luetkeana), and sea belt (Saccharina latissima). The most common cause of death of P. californica is being torn from the rocks during storms, which is made more likely by the increased drag caused by the burden from epiphytes. P. californica and other Laminariales attempt to reduce their epiphytic load by periodically sloughing off their surface layers and by the production of "antifouling" substances such as phenols in their tissues. The washed-up woody stipes are slow to degrade on shore, and have been found being used by bald eagles as nest material.

At Race Rocks Ecological Reserve near Vancouver Island, it was found that during the winter, the only remains of the kelp forest was the bare stipes of P. californica, the annual seaweeds having been broken down and dispersed. By mid summer however, the fast-growing N. luetkeana formed the canopy while P. californica and S. latissima formed a middle-storey layer. In a research study in that location, it was found that much of the N. luetkeana was growing epiphytically on P. californica with their holdfasts attached to the blades and upper portions of the stipes. S latissima was also epiphytic but occupied the middle part of the stipe. Neither was present on the lower regions of the stipe and it was thought that this was due to grazing pressure from benthic macrofauna such as sea urchins.

Herbivores feed on P. californica and other kelp species, the predominant grazers being sea urchins. If the population size of these becomes too great, "urchin barrens" with no large algal species may develop and may remain in existence for years. A reduction in the number of predators or a diminution in the quantity of drift algae may encourage hungry urchins to overexploit and potentially eradicate the kelp. The sea urchins Strongylocentrotus purpuratus and Strongylocentrotus droebachiensis graze on P. californica at the northern end of its range.
