= Giant kelp marine forests of south east Australia =

Australian endangered ecological community

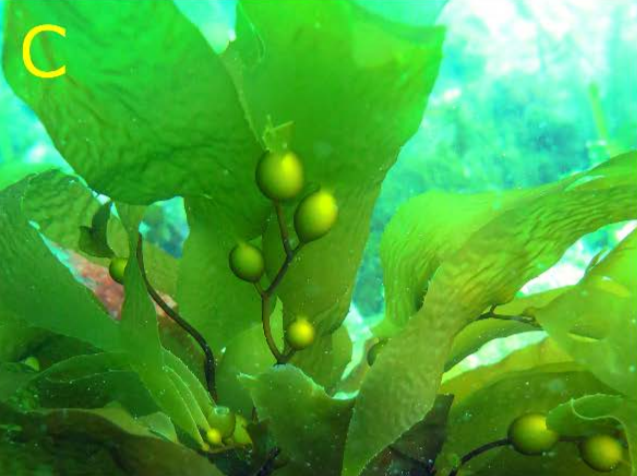
Macrocystis pyrifera sporophytes at Fortescue Bay, Tasmania

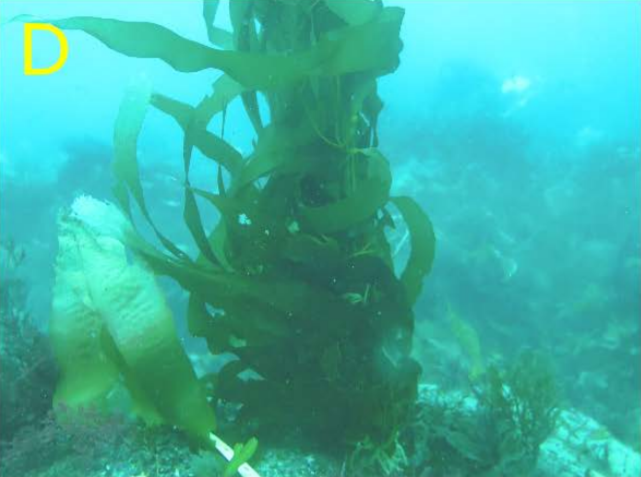
Macrocystis pyrifera at Trumpeter Bay, Tasmania in early autumn 2021

Giant kelp marine forests of south east Australia is an endangered ecological community, listed under the EPBC Act of the Commonwealth of Australia. The community is found in coastal waters of Victoria, South Australia, and Tasmania.

== Description ==
Kelp forests are found in cold water regions in shallow coastal waters. Giant kelp marine forests are diverse, complex and highly productive components and foundation species of cold-water rocky marine coastlines around the world. Giant kelp marine forests in Australia are typically found in temperate south eastern waters on rocky reefs where conditions are cool and reasonably nutrient rich.

The Giant kelp marine forests of south east Australia is a community extending from the ocean floor to the ocean surface, on a rocky substrate, and has a ‘forest-like’ structure with many organisms occupying its various layers, including pelagic and demersal fishes, sea birds, turtles and marine mammals in addition to the invertebrate organisms that inhabit the sea floor. The ecological community is characterised by a closed to semi-closed surface or subsurface canopy of M. pyrifera. This species is a foundation species which provides critical ecosystem services such as, for example, nursery grounds, primary production, and adult habitats for marine organisms, including Chordata, Arthropoda, Annelida, Echinodermata, Bryozoa, Cnidaria, Mollusca, Platyhelminthes, Brachiopoda and Porifera. This is the only kelp which gives this three dimensional structure from the sea floor to the sea surface, and the loss of giant kelp plants destroys this community.

== Threats ==
Threats to the community include

1. increase in sea surface temperature due to climate change
2. range expansion of kelp-grazing sea urchins (due to these temperature changes)
3. land-use changes resulting in increasing sediment flows which decrease the quality and availability of kelp habitat

== Conservation status ==
This ecological community has been listed as endangered under the Commonwealth EPBC Act since 29 August 2012, after advice to the minister.
