= Natural Heritage Trust =

Australian program for funding environmental programs

The Natural Heritage Trust (NHT), or National Heritage Trust Account was set up in 1997 by means of the Natural Heritage Trust of Australia Act 1997, with the main objective of conserving the "natural capital infrastructure" of Australia. Money from the NHT Account must be spent on the environment, sustainable agriculture and natural resources management (NRM). Since its establishment, a considerable number of community groups and organisations have received funding for environmental and natural resource management projects, delivered via a number of different initiatives since 1997. As of June 2020, the NHT account is funding a program known as Phase Two of the National Landcare Program. The original National Landcare Program was launched in 1992, but in 2014 merged with the Caring for our Country program (established 2008, and funded through NHT).

The Natural Heritage Ministerial Board was established under the Act, to provide a mechanism for liaison between the Environment and Agriculture Ministers on matters relating to the account.

== History ==
The Natural Heritage Trust was set up in 1997 by the Natural Heritage Trust of Australia Act 1997, with the main objective being "to conserve, repair and replenish Australia’s natural capital infrastructure". The fund was set up with the proceeds (A$1.35 billion) of the partial sale of Telstra. Money from the NHT account must be spent on the environment, sustainable agriculture and natural resources management.

The NHT allocated funding on a regional, community (through Envirofund), state or national level to various Natural Resource Management organisations until 2008, when the activities of the Natural Heritage Trust became the responsibility of the "Caring for Our Country" initiative.

Caring for Our Country built on the foundations of the NHT program and integrated other NRM programs such as Landcare (a.k.a. the National Landcare Program(me)), the Environmental Stewardship Program, National Wildlife Corridors, and Working on Country. Its objective was "to achieve an environment that is healthier, better protected, well managed and resilient and that also provides essential ecosystem services in a changing climate". The first phase of the program began in July 2008, with over A$2 billion allocated to it, and ended in June 2013. An assessment of this phase was reported on, and a second phase was to be implemented from 2013.

In 2013 the government announced that Caring for our Country would be combined with the National Landcare Program(me). This was at this point dubbed "Caring for our Country 2013-2018", with accompanying description that the delivery of the second phase of Caring for our Country was through two specific streams, "Sustainable Environment" and "Sustainable Agriculture". (A$316.7 million was paid in 2013–14 as part of the first year of phase 2 of Caring for our Country.

The National Landcare Program was established in 1992, and along with NHT and Caring for Our Country provided community-based funding for improving land management practices and delivering environmental outcomes. A new revised version of the National Landcare Program, merged with Caring for Our Country, was announced in 2014, with a budget of A$1 billion over 4 years. This was a reduction of A$471.6 million from the previous forward estimates. The savings were diverted to other programs, such as the Reef 2050 Long-term Sustainability Plan (Reef Plan 2050) for the Great Barrier Reef. The 2015 Senate Standing Committee report on Landcare (SECRC 2015) considered that the reduction in funding for Landcare would have a detrimental impact on NRM in Australia. The overall objectives of the new Landcare model were largely consistent with Caring for our Country, and although investment in the regional stream decreased, investment in NRM has been supplemented by other government programs, including new investments in Australian biosecurity.

The management of biodiversity is also supported by federal government initiatives such as the Biodiversity Fund program (established 2011), the Green Army (launched 2014), Working on Country Indigenous rangers program, and each state and territory also undertakes significant conservation efforts, as do local governments, NGOs and industry.

The government invested A$1 billion through the National Landcare Program, Phase One, over four years from 2014–15 to 2017–18, including support for the Landcare Networks, 20 Million Trees and Australia's 56 regional natural resource management (NRM) organisations. The second phase of the National Landcare Program began in July 2017 and is due to be delivered until June 2023, with funding of around A$1 billion.

== Description ==
The Natural Heritage Ministerial Board, established by the Act, provides the formal mechanism for liaison and cooperation between the Environment and Agriculture Ministers (as of June 2020 jointly responsible for the Department of Agriculture, Water and the Environment, along with the Minister for Resources and Water) on all matters relating to jointly managed programs funded through the Natural Heritage Trust (NHT) of Australia Account. As of June 2020, the Board supports the design and delivery of the National Landcare Program. It also oversees and makes decisions on related programs funded through the NHT Account, including the Reef Plan 2050 and the Indigenous Protected Areas programs. The Board consists of the Environment Minister and the Agriculture Minister.

Section 43 of the Act requires the Minister to prepare an annual report on the operation of the Natural Heritage Trust of Australia Account.

As of June 2020, the NHT account is funding a program known as Phase Two of the National Landcare Program. It aims to address such issues as loss of vegetation; soil degradation; the introduction of pest weeds and animals; changes in water quality and flows; and changes in fire regimes.

== Related projects ==
The Natural Heritage Trust was a partner in funding of projects identified by the National Action Plan for Salinity and Water Quality (NAP) and subsequently the funding of projects within the context of the Natural Resource Management regions.

A Natural Resource Management region is a region defined by the Commonwealth, state and territory governments - 56 of which derived from assessments related to the selections made for the National Action Plan for Salinity and Water Quality (NAP) priority regions. The Australian National Land and Water Resources Audit data provided the groundwork for creating the regions. This included information on regions significantly affected by salinity and water quality, and regions where there was potential for cost-effective preventative action.

The National Action Plan for Salinity and Water Quality (NAP) started in 2000 and 2001 and ended a round of funding in 2008.
