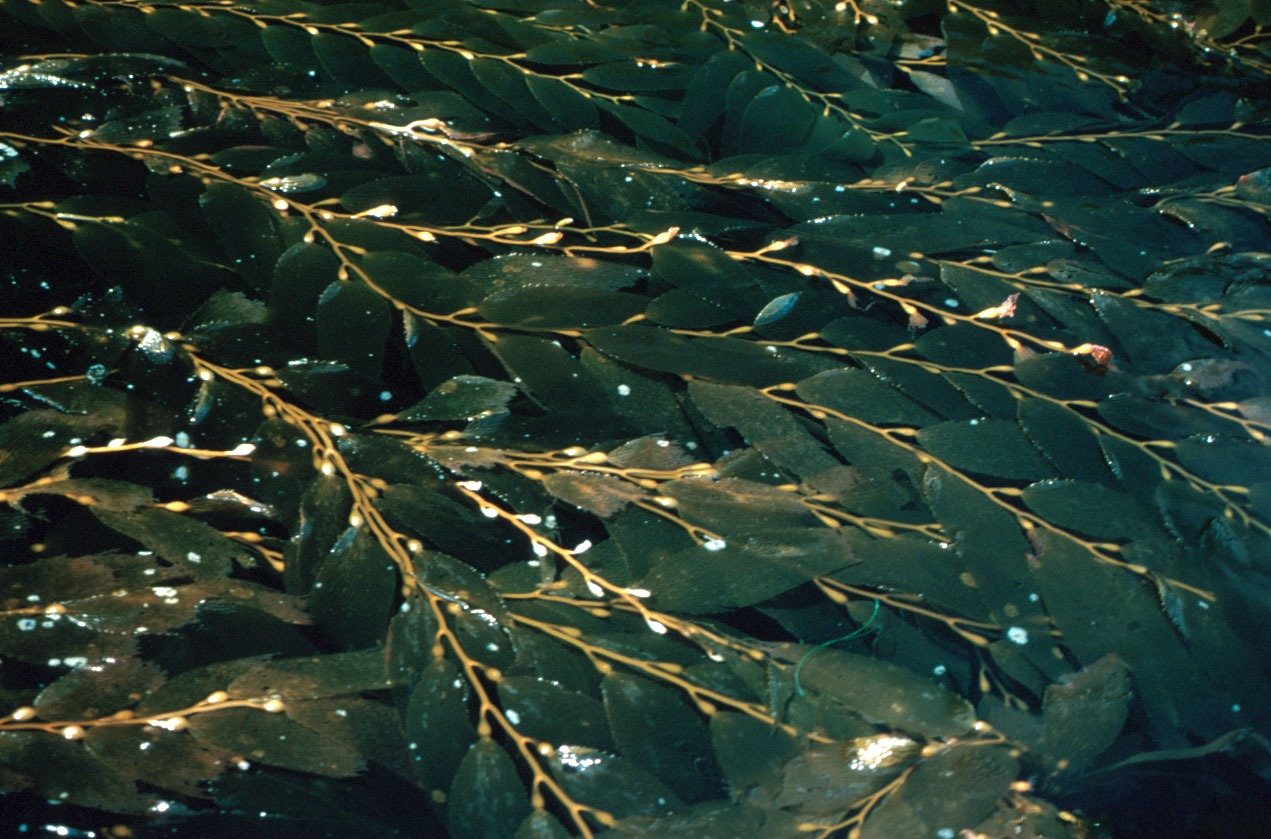
- Macrocystis pyrifera

Scientific classification
- Domain: Eukaryota
- Supergroup: Stramenopiles
- Division: Ochrophyta
- Class: Phaeophyceae
- Order: Laminariales
- Family: Laminariaceae
- Genus: Macrocystis; C.Agardh
- Species: M. pyrifera

Binomial name
- Macrocystis pyrifera (L.) C.Agardh

Synonyms
- Fucus pyrifer L.; Laminaria pyrifera (L.) Lamouroux; M. humboldtii (Bonpland) C.Ag.; M. planicaulis C. Agardh; M. pyrifera var. humboldtii Bonplan.; Heterotypic synonymsC. Agardh: Macrocystis angustifolia; Macrocystis integrifolia Bory de Saint-Vincent 1826; Macrocystis laevis

= Macrocystis =

Genus of large brown algae

Macrocystis, commonly known as giant kelp, is a monospecific genus of kelp (large brown algae). Previously, several species had been reognized, including M. pyrifera, M. angustifolia, M. integrifolia, and M. laevis. Various technical studies corroborated this, especially a molecular genetics study concluding that in spite of great morphological and ecological difference, there is only one species. This genus contains the largest of all the Phaeophyceae or brown algae. Macrocystis has pneumatocysts (air bladders) at the base of its blades. Sporophytes, the macroscopic forms, are perennial and the individual may live for up to three years depending on geographic location and weather conditions; stipes/fronds within a whole individual undergo senescence, where each frond may persist for approximately 100 days. The genus is found widely in subtropical, temperate, and sub-Antarctic oceans of the Southern Hemisphere and in the northeast Pacific. Macrocystis is often a major component of temperate kelp forests.

Despite its appearance, it is not a plant, but a stramenopile. Giant kelp is common along the coast of the northeastern Pacific Ocean, from Baja California north to southeast Alaska, and is also found in the southern oceans near South America, South Africa, Australia, and New Zealand. Individual algae may grow to more than 45 metres (150 feet) long at a rate of as much as 60 cm (2 ft) per day. Giant kelp usually grows in dense stands known as kelp forests, which are home to many marine animals that depend on the algae for food or shelter. The primary commercial product obtained from giant kelp is alginate, but humans also harvest this species on a limited basis for use directly as food. It is rich in iodine, potassium, and other minerals. It can be used in cooking in many of the ways other sea vegetables are used, and particularly serves to add flavor to bean dishes.

== Description ==
Macrocystis is a monospecific genus; the sole species is M. pyrifera. Some individuals are so huge that they may grow to up to 60 m (200 ft) longthough in some parts of the world they may be only a few meters in extent. The stipes arise from a holdfast and branch three or four times from near the base. Blades develop at irregular intervals along the stipe. The stipes are unbranched and each vegetative blade has a gas bladder at its base.

Macrocystis pyrifera is the largest of all algae. The stage of the life cycle that is usually seen is the sporophyte, which is perennial and individuals persist for many years. Individuals may grow to up to 50 m (160 ft) long or more. The kelp often grows even longer than the distance from the bottom to the surface as it will grow in a diagonal direction due to the ocean current pushing against the kelp. The stalks arise from a basal meristem, with as many as 60 stalks in older well protected individuals. Blades develop at irregular intervals along the stipe, with a single pneumatocyst (gas bladder) at the base of each blade. At the base of each stalk is a cluster of blades that lack pneumatocysts; instead they develop small sacks on the blade that release the biflagellated zoospores: these are the sporophylls.

The smaller morphs, formerly identified as Macrocystis integrifolia, have deep brown color on flattened rhizomes which are profusely dichotomously branched. Each is attached by branched root-like structures coming out of the sides of the rhizomes. Slender main stipes (about 1 centimetre (0.39 in) wide to 30 metres (98 ft) long) come from the rhizome which is up to 0.1 metres (3.9 in) at the widest. Periodically 5 centimetres (2.0 in) wide and 35 centimetres (14 in) long flattened leaf-like branches derive from the stipe. They have furrowed surfaces and taper gradually, but then have an oval or rounded float where attached to the stipe. The blade-like branches have notched denticulate edges leading to the terminal blade at the tip of the stipe, which is separated by several smaller branches. It grows to only 6 m (20 ft) long. It is found on intertidal rocks or shallow subtidal rocks along the Pacific coast of North America (British Columbia to California) and subtidally in South America. In New Zealand M. pyrifera is found in the subtidal zone of southern North Island, the South Island, Chatham, Stewart, Bounty, Antipodes, Auckland and Campbell Islands. The species can be found on rock and on sheltered open coasts.

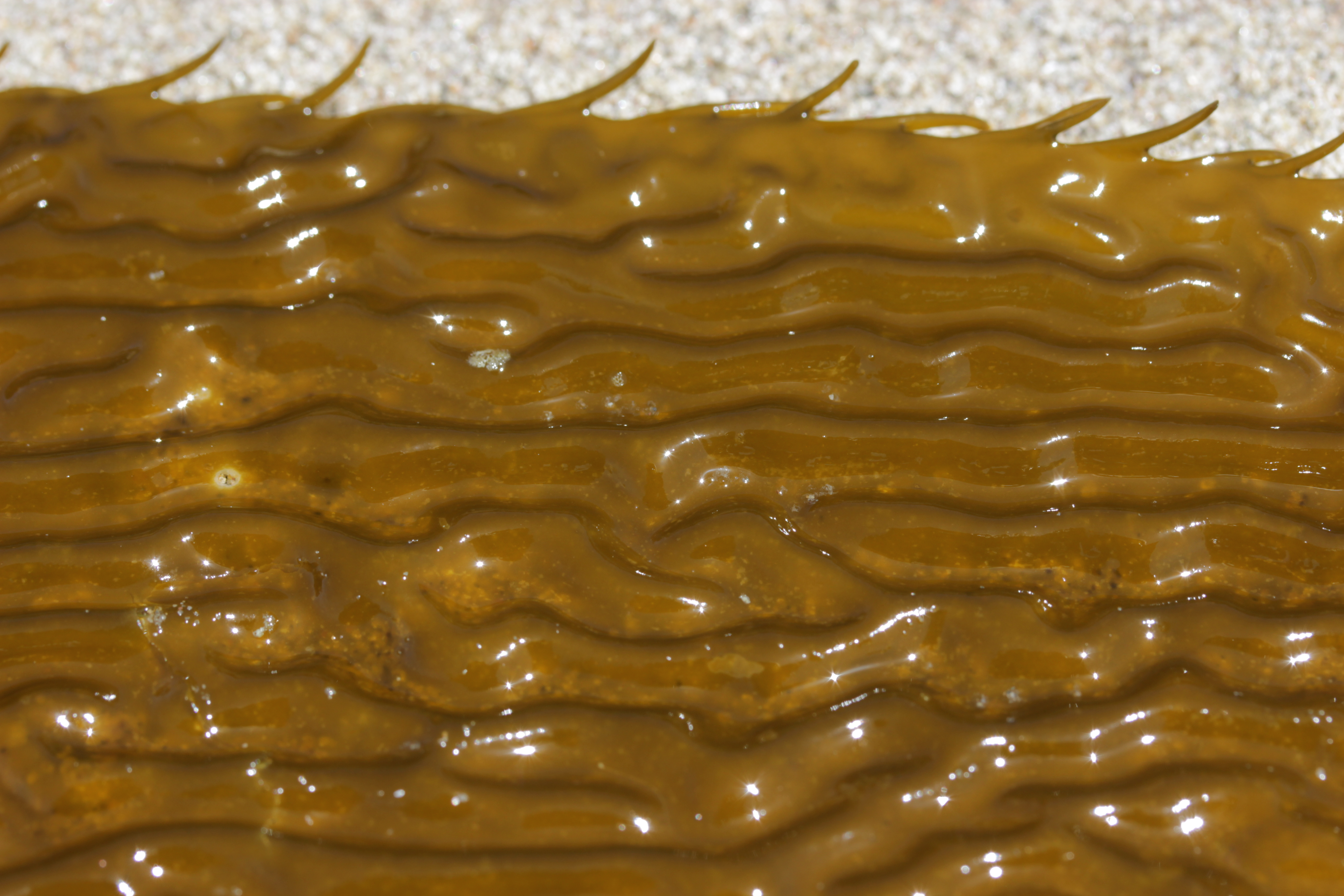

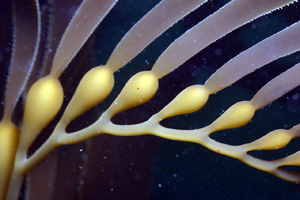

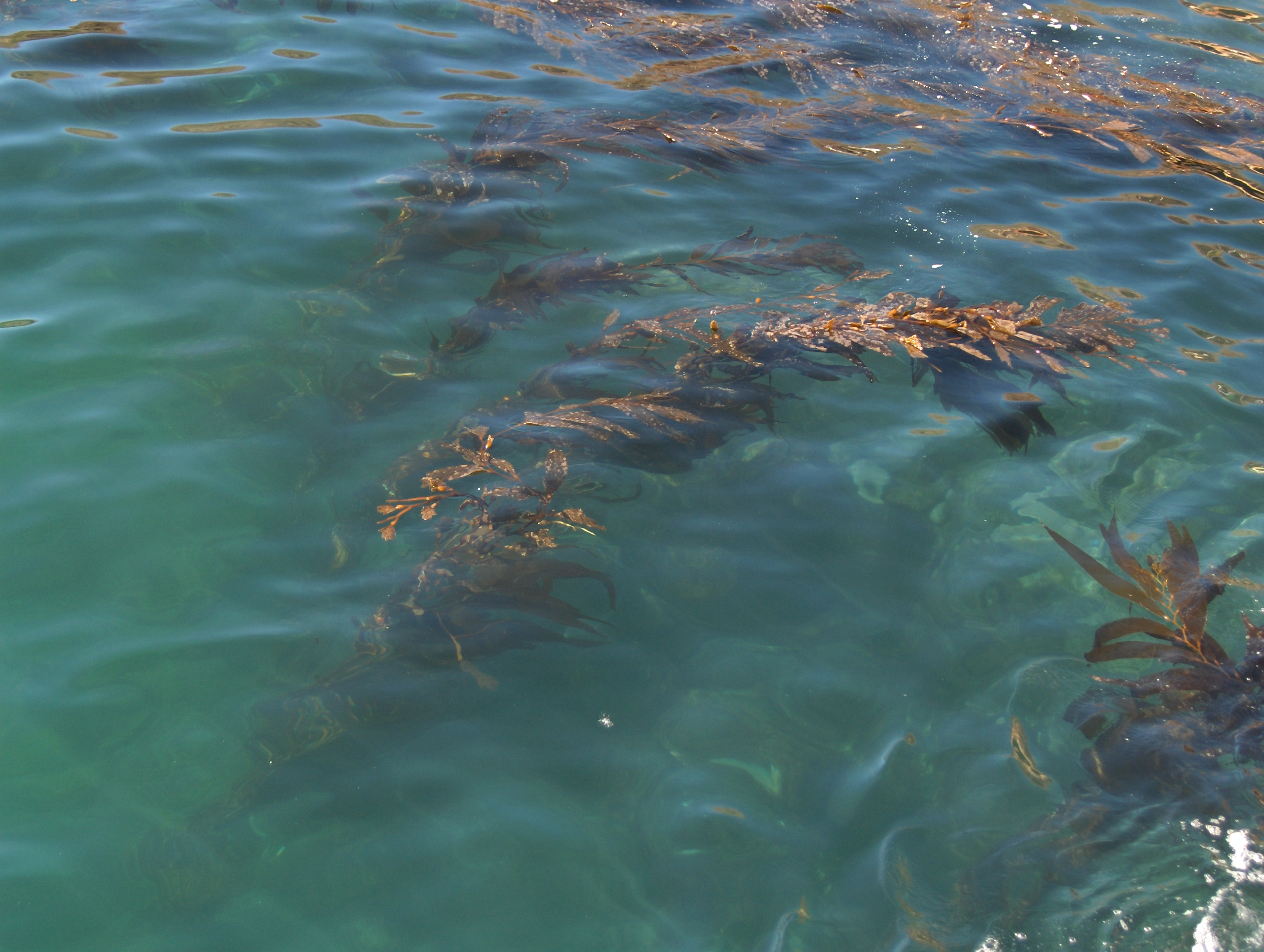
M. pyrifera growing in the Channel Islands

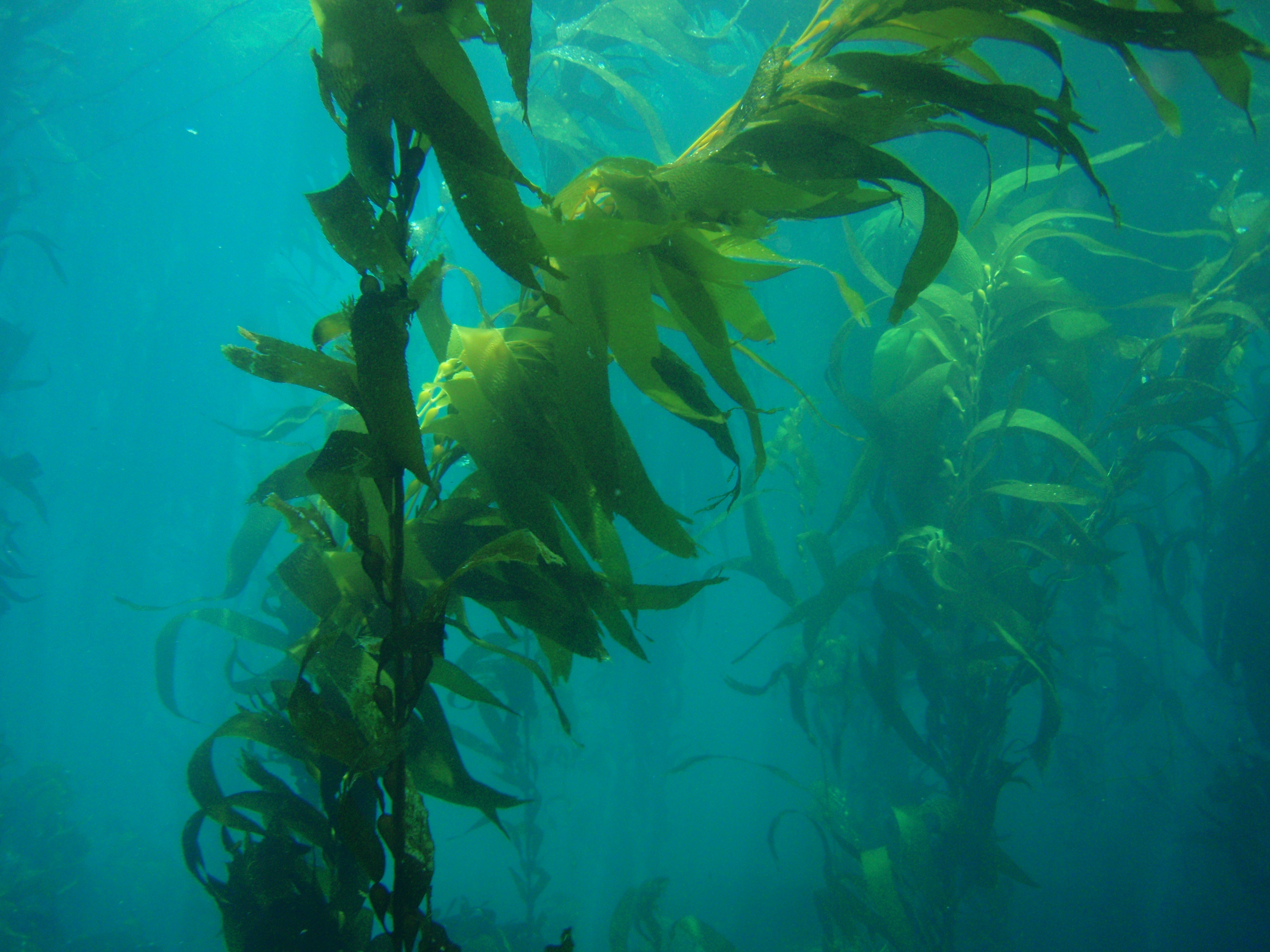
Giant kelp

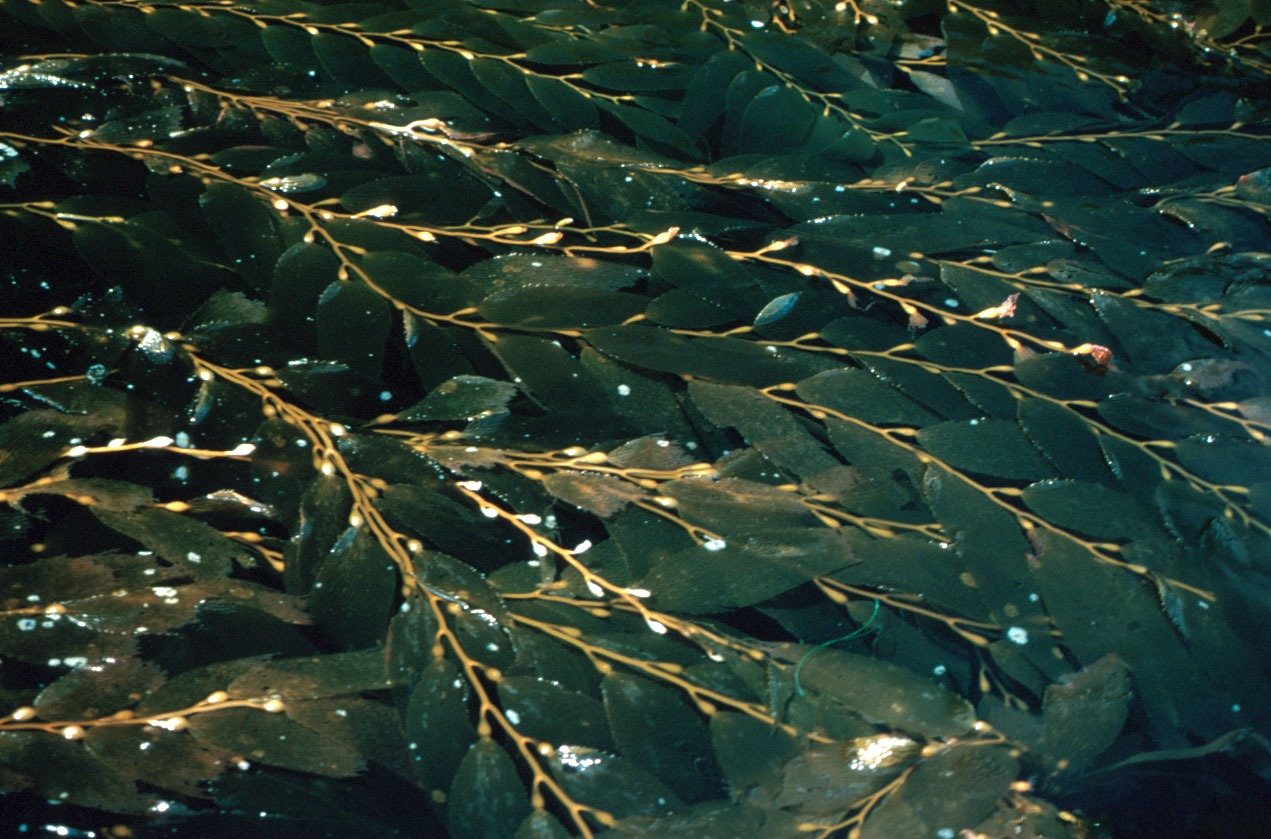
Kelp fronds floating near the surface

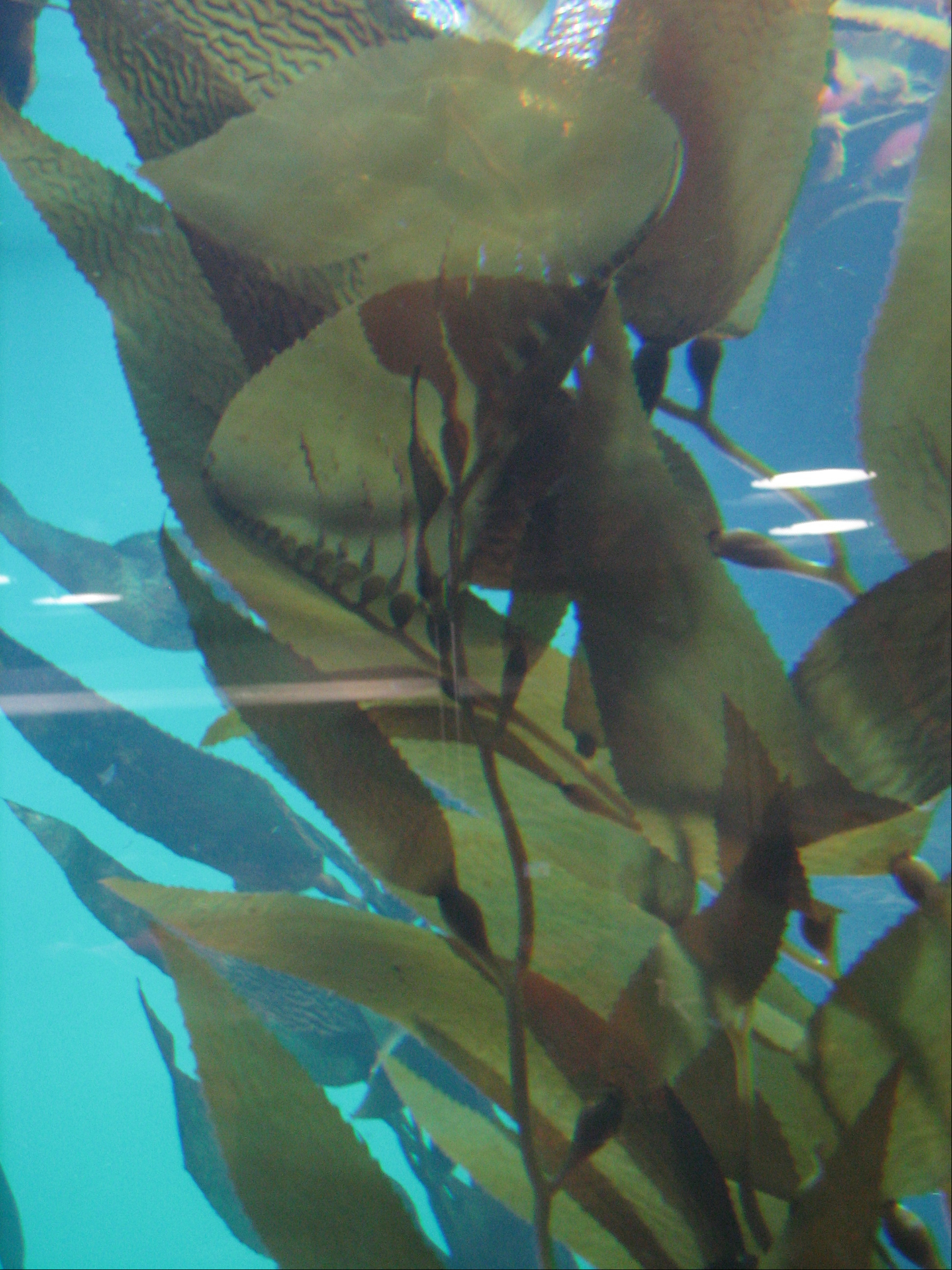
Growing apex (plastic model)

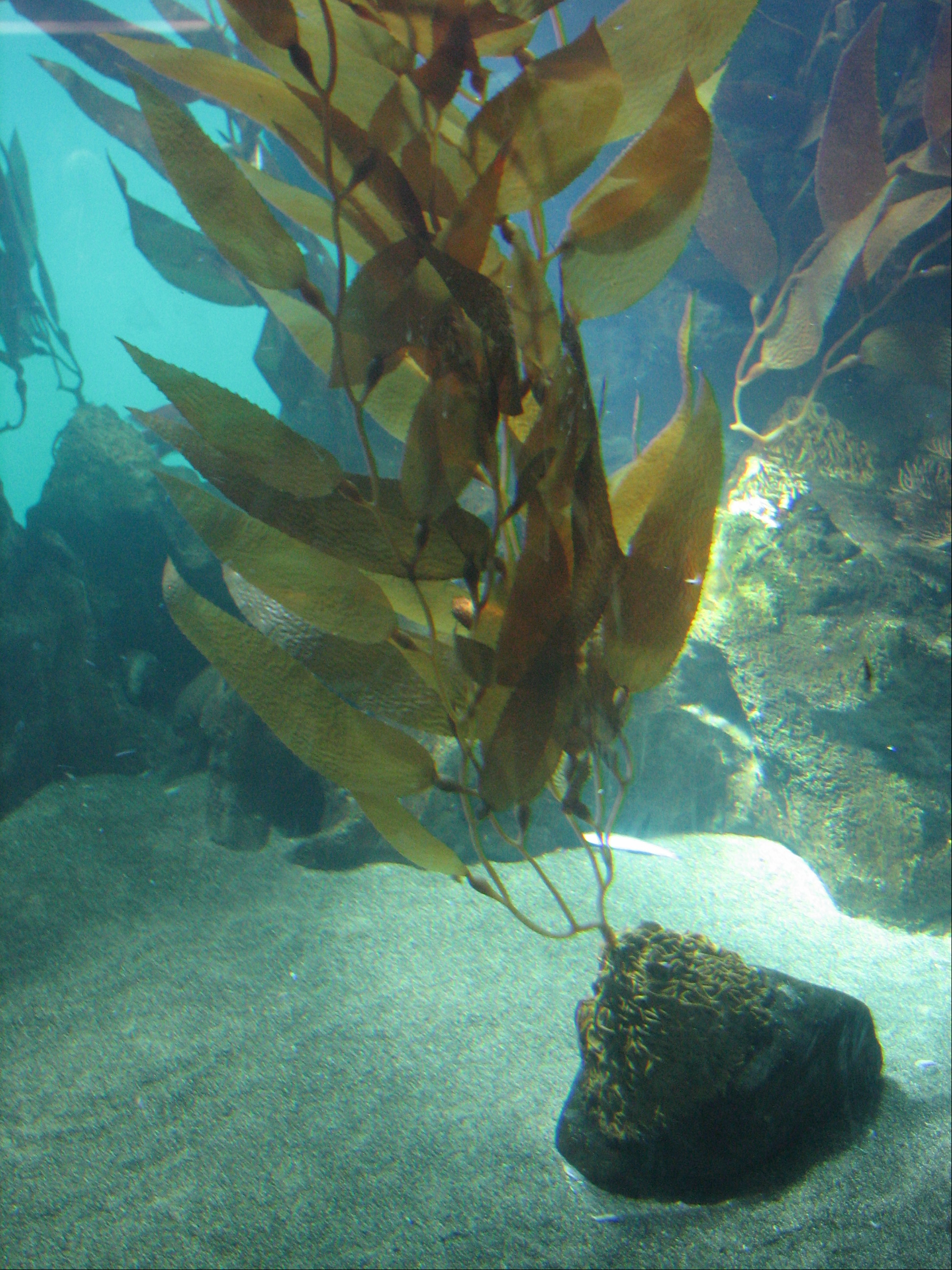
Holdfast of a small individual (plastic model)

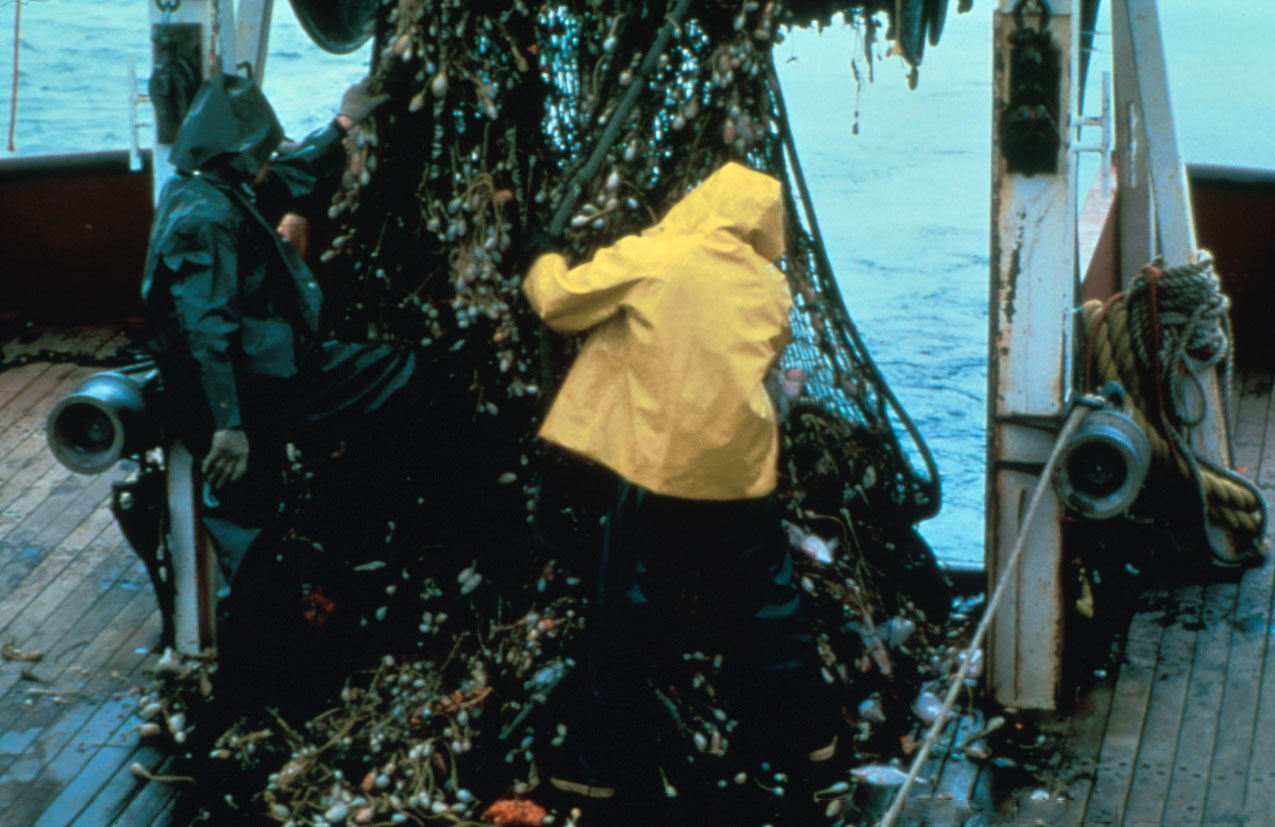
Kelp harvest

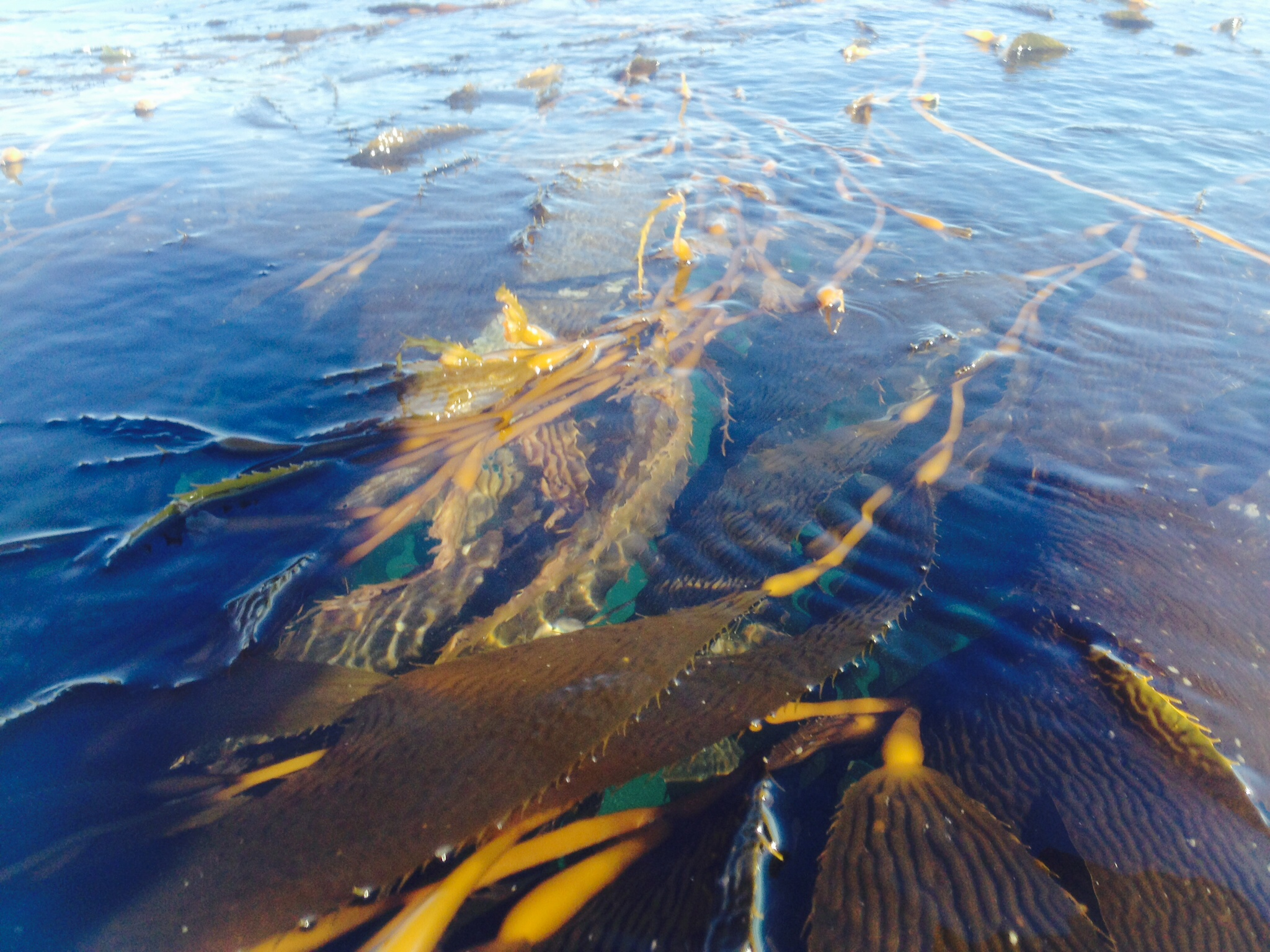
Giant kelp floating just outside the Santa Cruz harbor

Calico bass swimming inside giant kelp

== Life cycle ==
The macroscopic sporophyte has many specialized blades growing near the holdfast called sporophylls. These blades bear various sori containing sporangia, which release haploid spores, which will grow into microscopic female and male gametophytes. These gametophytes, after reaching the appropriate substrata, grow mitotically to eventually produce gametes.

Females release their eggs (oogonia) along with a pheromone, the lamoxirene. This compound triggers sperm release by males. The Macrocystis sperm consists of biflagellate non-synthetic antherozoids, which find their way to the oogonia following the lamoxirene. The egg is then fertilized to form the zygote, which, through mitosis, begins growth.

What was previously known as Macrocystis integrifolia is found on intertidal rocks or shallow subtidal rocks along the Pacific coast of North America from British Columbia to California. It prefers water about 7 metres (23 ft) to 10 metres (33 ft) deep and exposed to the open sea and normal salinities, yet sheltered from full wave action.

Macrocystis integrifolia alternates heteromorphic phases from a macroscopic sporophyte to dioecious microscopic gametophytes. It has been studied as a plant fertilizer, increasing bean yields up to 24% and chemical studies indicate presence of phytohormone-like substances.

== Growth ==
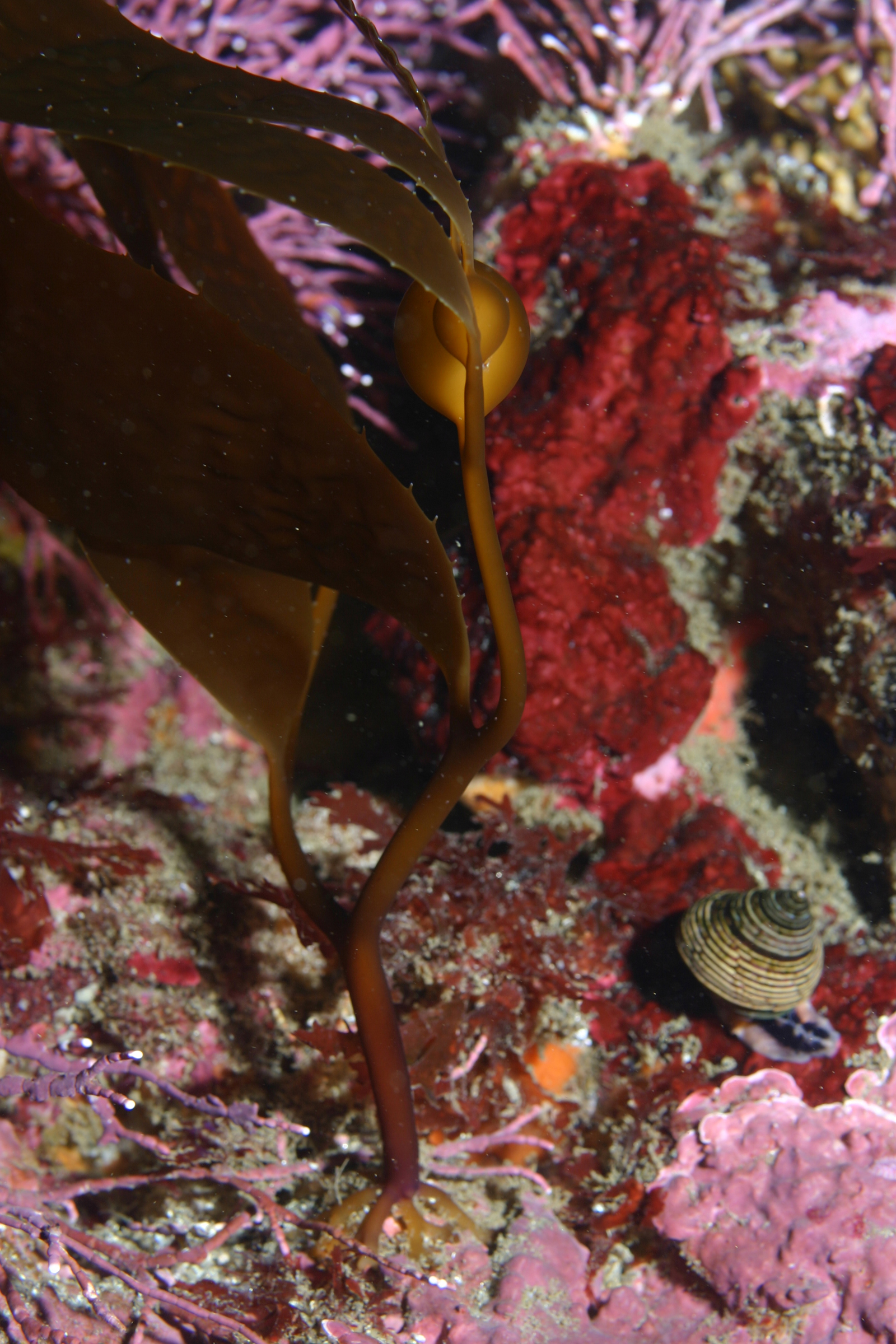
Juvenile Macrocystis pyrifera, Whaler's Cove (Point Lobos State Reserve)

Macrocystis pyrifera is one of the fastest-growing organisms on Earth. They can grow at a rate of 60 cm (2 ft) a day to reach over 45 m (150 ft) long in one growing season.

Juvenile giant kelp grow directly upon their parent female gametophyte. To establish itself, a young kelp produces one or two primary blades, and begins a rudimentary holdfast, which serves to anchor the plant to the rocky bottom. As the kelp grows, additional blades develop from the growing tip, while the holdfast enlarges and may entirely cover the rock to which it is attached.

Growth occurs with lengthening of the stipe (central stalk), and splitting of the blades. At the growing tip is a single blade, at the base of which develop small gas bladders along one side. As the bladders and stipe grow, small tears develop in the attached blade. Once the tears have completed, each bladder supports a single separate blade along the stipe, with the bladders and their blades attached at irregular intervals.

== Ecology ==
Macrocystis typically grow forming extensive beds, large "floating canopies", on rocky substrata between the low intertidal. It was harvested by barges which used large blades to harvest up to 300 tons a day along the coast of California.

Macrocystis pyrifera is found in North America (Alaska to California), South America, South Africa, New Zealand, and southern Australia. It thrives in cooler waters where the ocean water temperature remains mostly below 21 °C (70 °F). The species is also found near Tristan da Cunha in the Mid-South Atlantic Ocean.

Where the bottom is rocky and affords places for it to anchor, giant kelp forms extensive kelp beds with large "floating canopies". When present in large numbers, giant kelp forms kelp forests that are home to many marine species that depend upon the kelp directly for food and shelter, or indirectly as a hunting ground for prey. Both the large size of the kelp and the large number of individuals significantly alter the availability of light, the flow of ocean currents, and the chemistry of the ocean water in the area where they grow.

In high-density populations, giant kelp individuals compete with other individuals of the species for space and resources. Giant kelp may also compete with the kelp Pterygophora californica in these circumstances.

Where surface waters are poor in nutrients, nitrogen in the form of amino acids is translocated up the stipe through sieve elements that very much resemble the phloem of vascular plants. Translocation of nutrients along the stipe may be as rapid as 60 cm (24 in) per hour. Most translocation occurs to move carbon-rich photosynthate, and typically transfers material from mature regions to actively growing regions where the machinery of photosynthesis is not yet fully in place. Translocation also moves nutrients downward from light-exposed surface fronds to sporophylls (reproductive fronds) at the base of the kelp, where there is little light and thus little photosynthesis to produce food.

Recent research has shown that Arctic kelp forests can steadily increase pH levels by 0.15 units over a 10-day period during extended daylight conditions in summer. This pH regulation, driven by sustained photosynthetic activity, helps mitigate the harmful effects of ocean acidification and supports calcifying organisms such as bivalves and sea urchins.

== Species ==
Initially, 17 species were described within the genus Macrocystis. In 1874, Hooker, following blade morphology, put them all under the same taxon, Macrocystis pyrifera. In modern times, the large number of species were re-classified based on the holdfast morphology, which distinguished three species (M. angustifolia, M. integrifolia, and M. pyrifera) and on blade morphology, which added a fourth species (M. laevis) in 1986. In 2009 and 2010, however, two studies that used both morphological and molecular assessments demonstrate that Macrocystis is monospecific (as M. pyrifera), which is currently accepted by the phycological community (see AlgaeBase).

=== Morphs ===
Although Macrocystis is a monospecific genus, some split it into the four morphs, or sub-species, described below, following pre-2010 taxonomy:

- Macrocystis pyrifera, known as giant kelp, most widely distributed Macrocystis species, found in intermediate-to-deep water of North America (Alaska to California), South America, South Africa, New Zealand, and southern Australia.
- Macrocystis integrifolia, typically found on intertidal rocks or shallow subtidal rocks of British Columbia, California, Mexico, Peru and Northern Chile. It was considered a distinct species based on blade and holdfast morphology.
- Macrocystis laevis, a smaller, intertidal species, is found on the Pacific coast of North America (British Columbia to California) and South America.
- Macrocystis angustifolia Bory, known as southern giant kelp, is found in shallow waters of South Africa and South Australia. Note that a population in southern California was called M. angustifolia, but determined not to be so.

== Distribution ==
Macrocystis is distributed along the eastern Pacific coast from Alaska to Mexico and from Peru and along the Argentinian coast as well as in Australia, New Zealand, South Africa and most sub-Antarctic islands to 60°S.

== Aquaculture ==
Macrocystis pyrifera has been utilized for many years as a food source; it also contains many compounds such as iodine, potassium, other minerals vitamins and carbohydrates and thus has also been used as a dietary supplement. In the beginning of the 20th century California kelp beds were harvested as a source for soda ash. With commercial interest increasing significantly during the 1970s and the 1980s this was primarily due to the production of alginates, and also for biomass production for animal feed due to the energy crisis during that period. However the commercial production of M. pyrifera never became reality. With the end of the energy crisis and the decline in prices of alginates, the research into farming Macrocystis also declined.

The demand for M. pyrifera is increasing due to the newfound uses of these plants such as fertilizers, cultivation for bioremediation purposes, abalone and sea urchin feed. There is current research going into utilizing M. pyrifera as feed for other aquaculture species such as shrimps. Recently, M. pyrifera has been examined as a possible feedstock for conversion into ethanol for biofuel use.

== Conservation ==
In recent years, the kelp forests have decreased dramatically throughout Japan, Chile, Korea, Australia and North America. Harvesting of kelp as a food source and other uses may be the least concerning aspect to its depletion. In the Northwest Pacific kelp forests in waters near large population centres may be most affected by the sewer/stormwater discharge.

The natural phenomenon known as El Niño cycles warm, tropical water from the South Pacific to Northern waters. This has been known to kill off M. pyrifera, due to its need for cold waters it would usually find in the North Pacific Ocean. In California, El Niño also brought along a population bloom of purple sea urchins which feed on the giant kelp.

=== Tasmania ===
Off the coast of Tasmania, kelp forests have been significantly affected by several factors, including warming waters, shifting of the East Australian current (EAC), and invasion of long-spine sea urchins. Locals have noticed significant effects on the population of abalone, a food source for the Tasmanian people for thousands of years. These changes have also affected the oyster farming industry. By saving oysters that have survived disease outbreaks, they have been able to continue their way of life. It was estimated that by 2019, 95 per cent of the giant kelp forests along Tasmania's east coast had been lost within just a few decades. Some of this loss was attributed by locals to the harvesting of the forests by Alginates Australia, which opened its factory near Triabunna in 1963, shutting down operations 10 years later as uneconomical. However, expert in marine ecosystems Craig Johnson says that the loss of the forests "is almost certainly the result of climate change". Water temperatures along the east coast of Tasmania have been rising at nearly four times the average rate globally. The EAC brings warmer waters, which are also nutrient-poor compared to the previously usual cold water around the coast. Common kelp (Ecklonia radiata) is better at nitrogen storage than giant kelp, so has been taking over the areas formerly occupied by giant kelp.

Macrocystis pyrifera has become Australia's first federally-listed endangered marine community. Scientists and conservationists are continuously looking into ways to restore the once heavily populated species to its original state. Methods include artificial reefs, reducing numbers of purple sea urchins in overpopulated areas, and planting roots along the ocean floor. Scientists had built 28 artificial reefs off Maria Island by 2019, and were hopeful of bringing the kelp forests back.

=== New Zealand ===
Macrocystis pyrifera have begun to decline in New Zealand, and has been classified as having the "At Risk, Declining" conservation status under the New Zealand Threat Classification System. Populations in the Fiordland area are at a much higher risk due to the low genetic diversity found here relative to other areas of the country.

== See also ==
- Largest organisms
