= List of marine aquarium plant species =

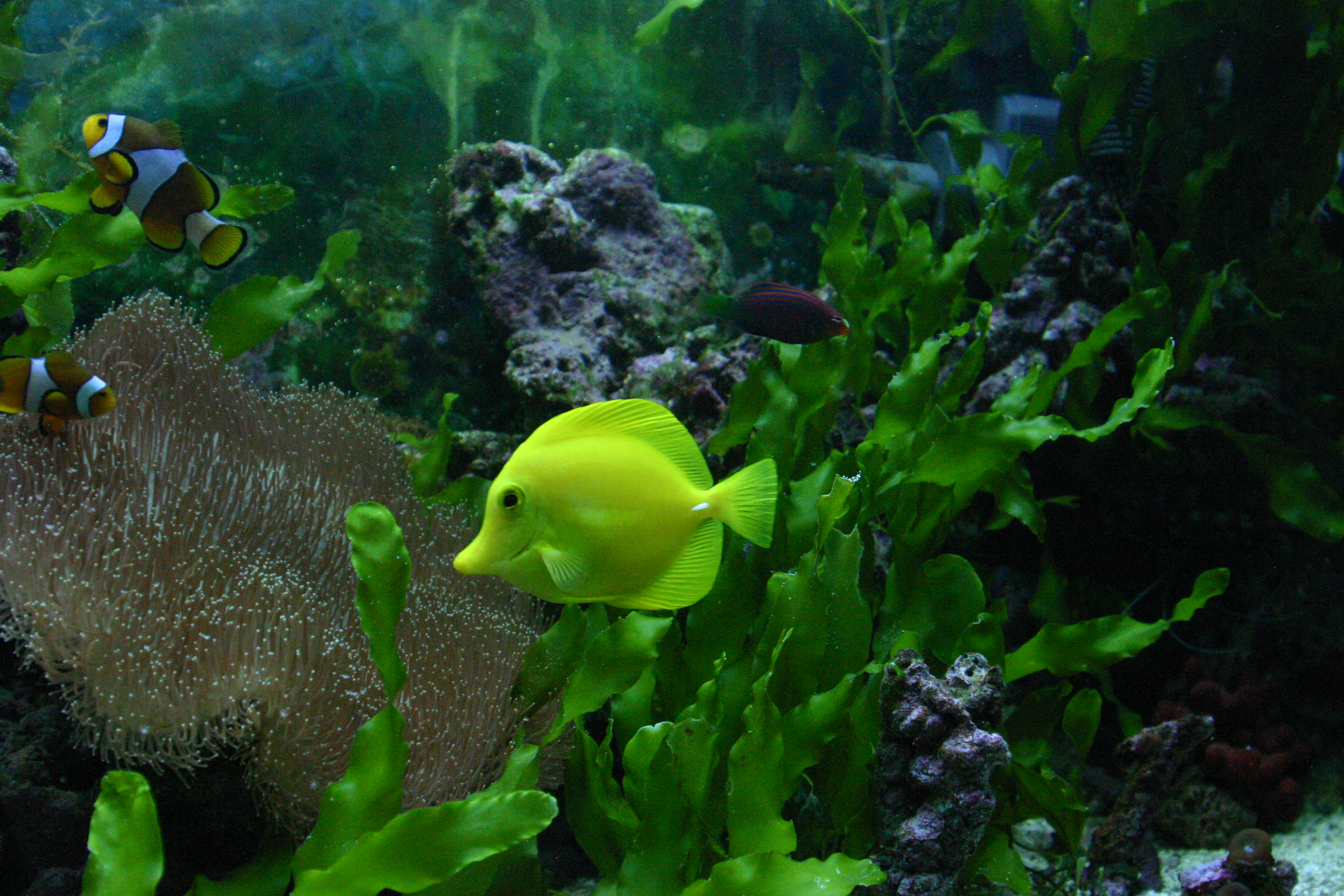
A planted reef aquarium filled with Bladed sand moss (Caulerpa prolifera)

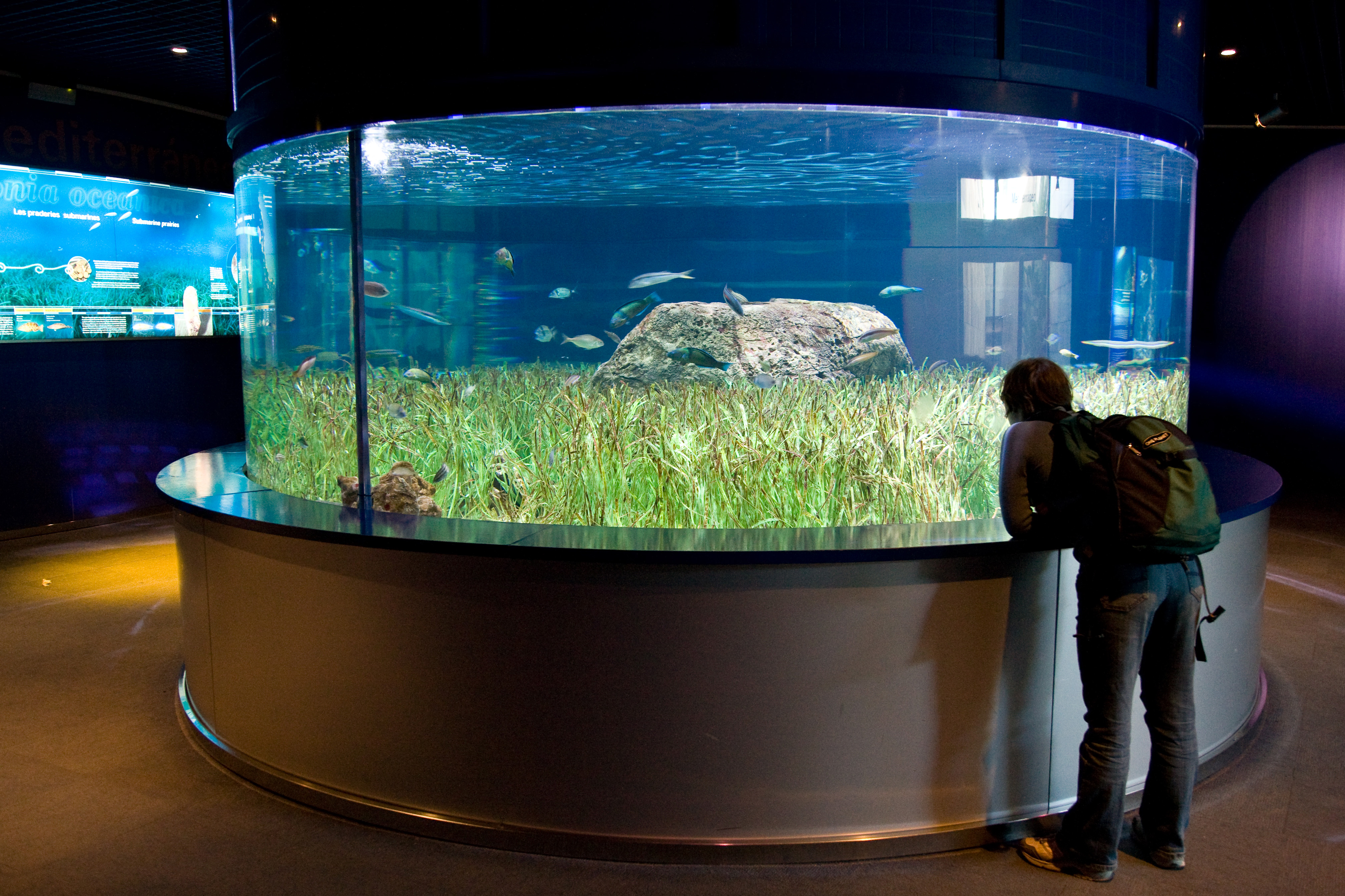
A seagrass aquarium housing several seagrass meadow inhabitants

Aquatic plants are used to give the aquarium a natural appearance, oxygenate the water, and provide habitat for fish, especially fry (babies) and for invertebrates. Some aquarium fish and invertebrates also eat live plants. Hobby aquarists use aquatic plants for aquascaping.

Marine algae are also included in this list for convenience, despite the fact that many species are technically classified as protists, not plants.

== Brown macroalgae ==
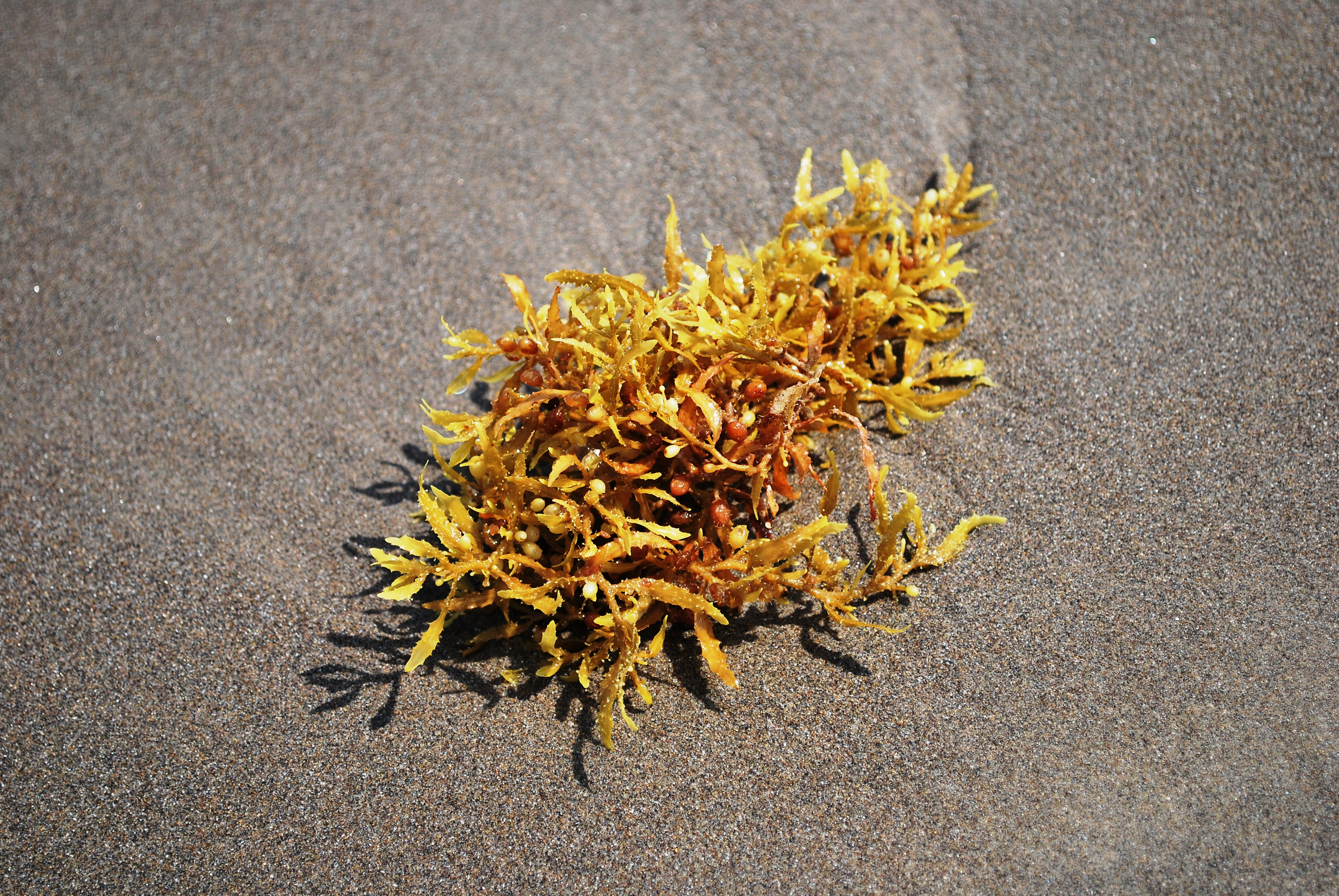
Sargasso

Brown macroalgae are sometimes seasonally available in the aquarium trade and under suitable conditions, will grow quite prolifically. They possess the pigment Fucoxanthin which gives them their coloration ranging from yellow to dark brown. A few are desirable yet many are pests with some species being rather difficult to remove, often making their way into aquariums on live rock.

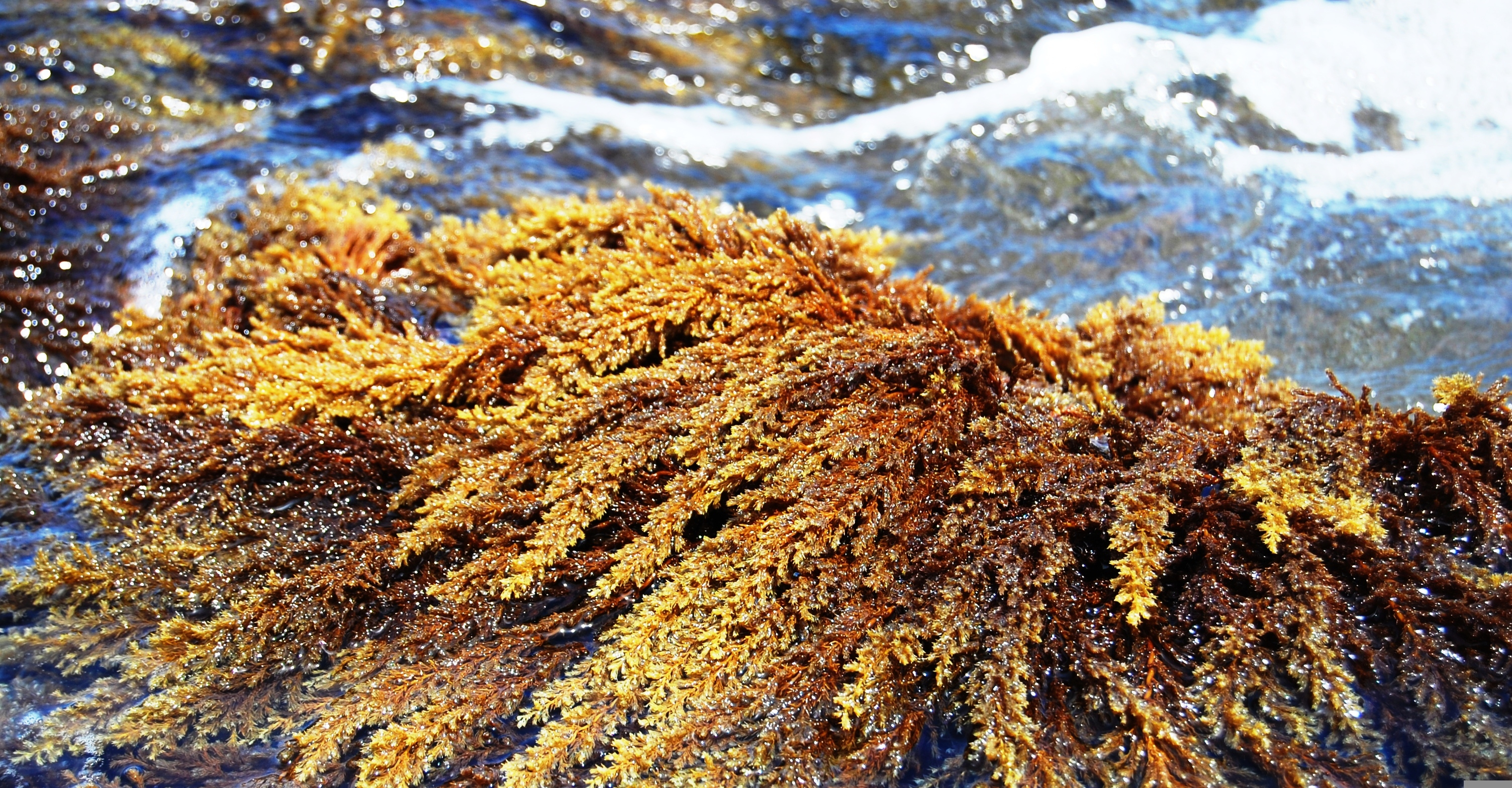
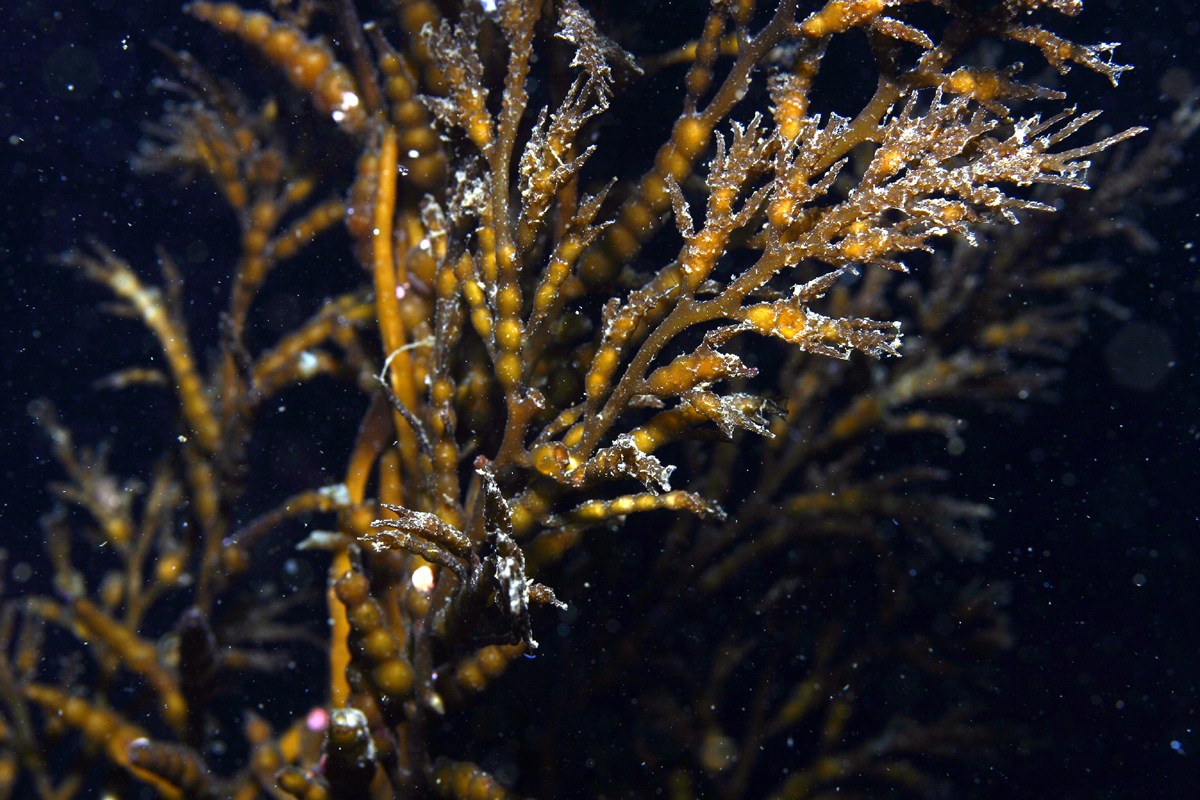
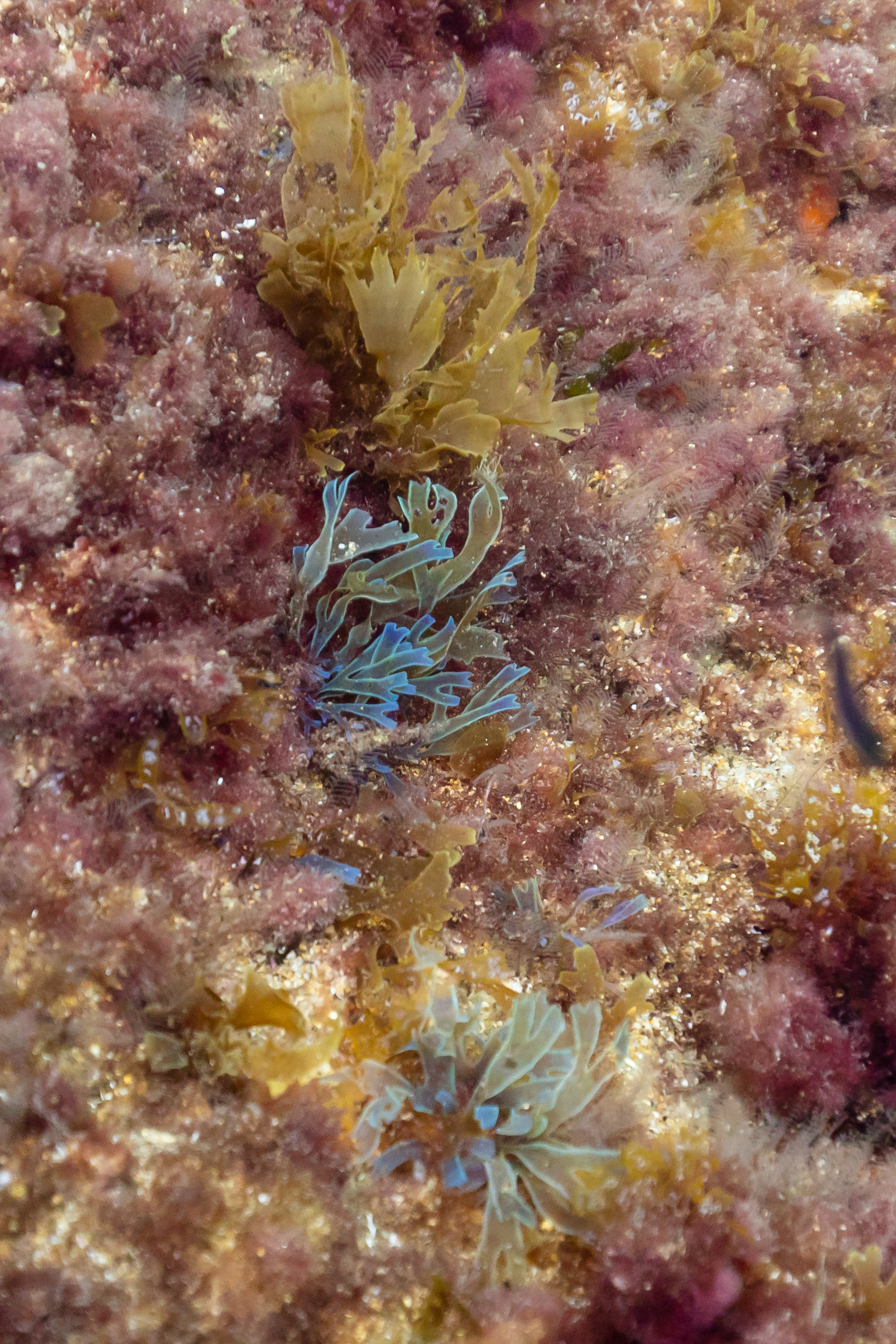
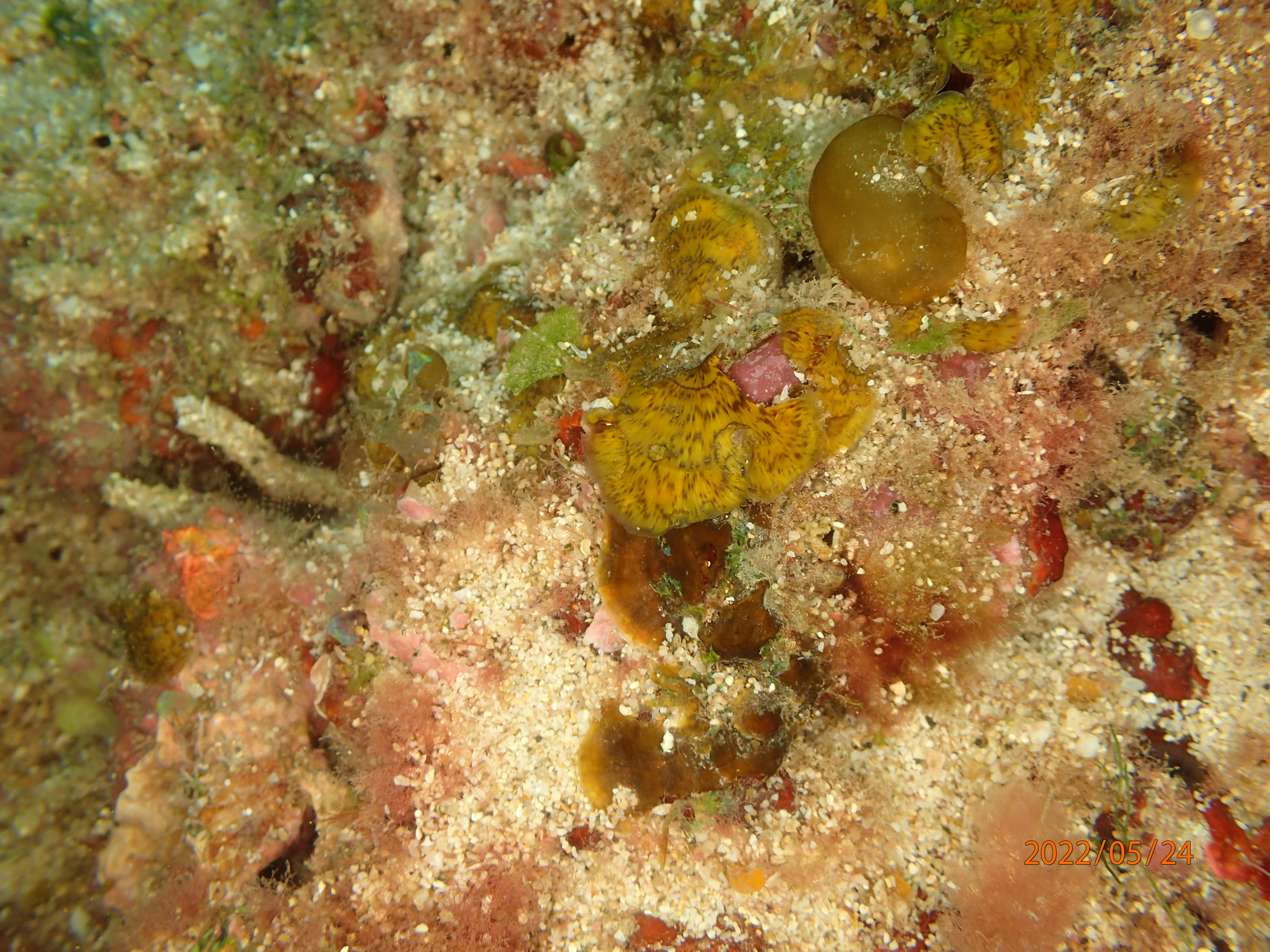
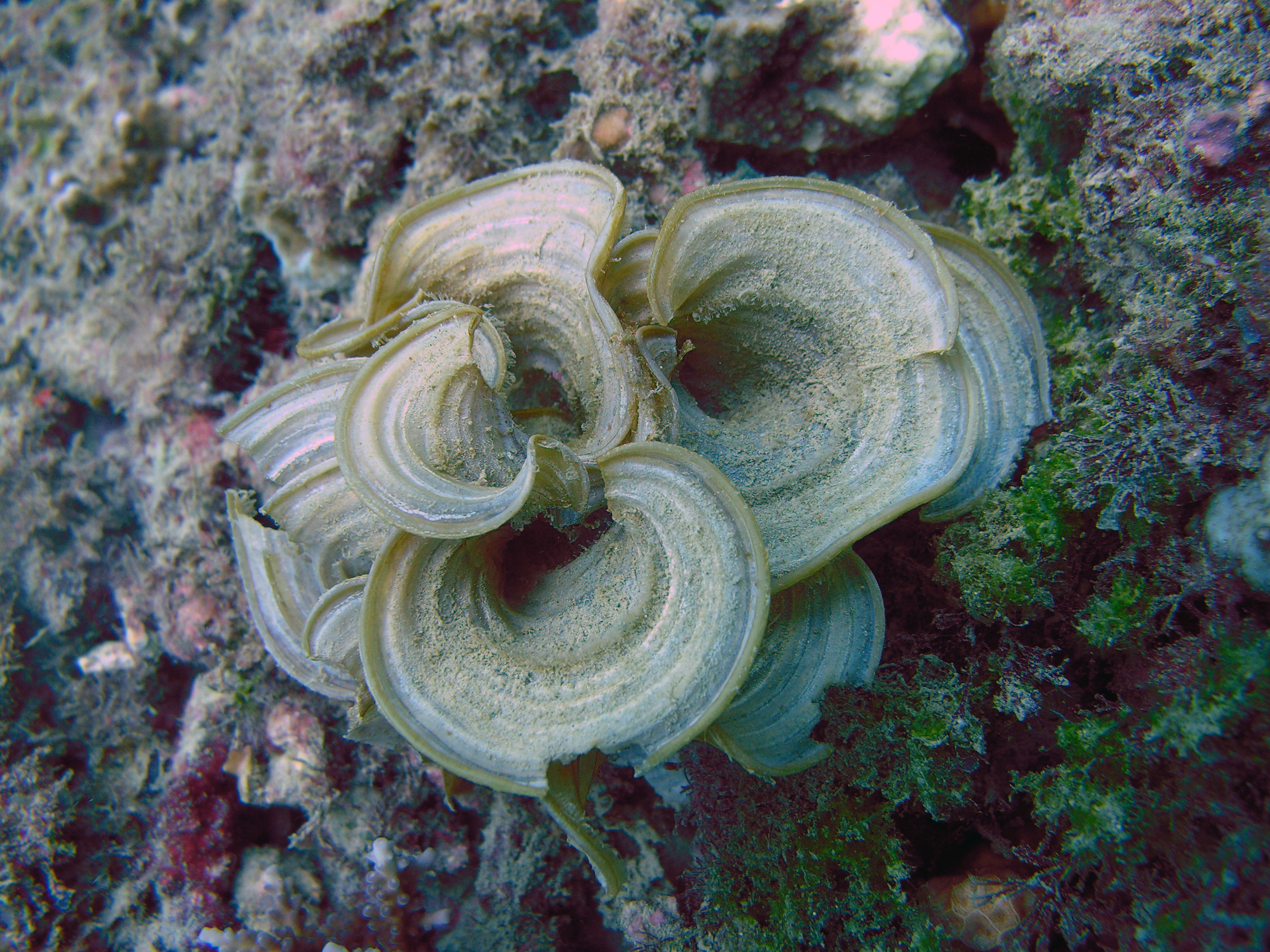
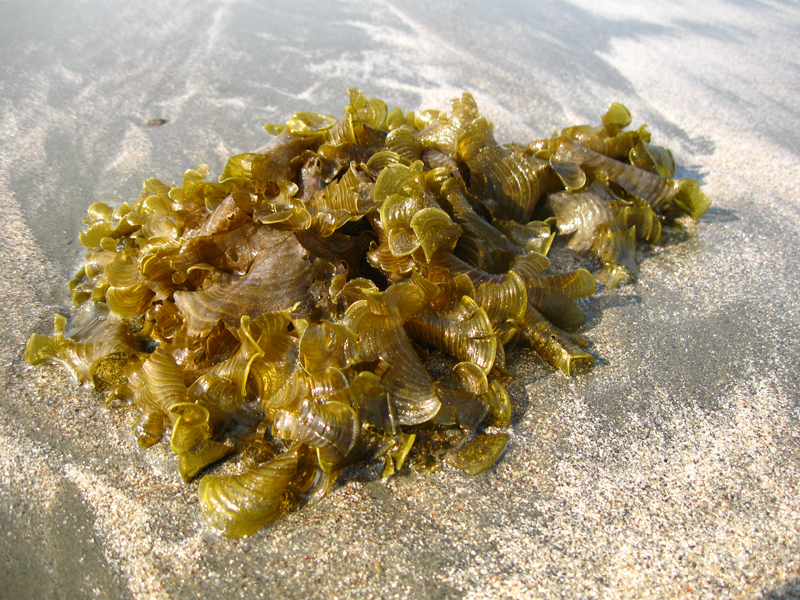
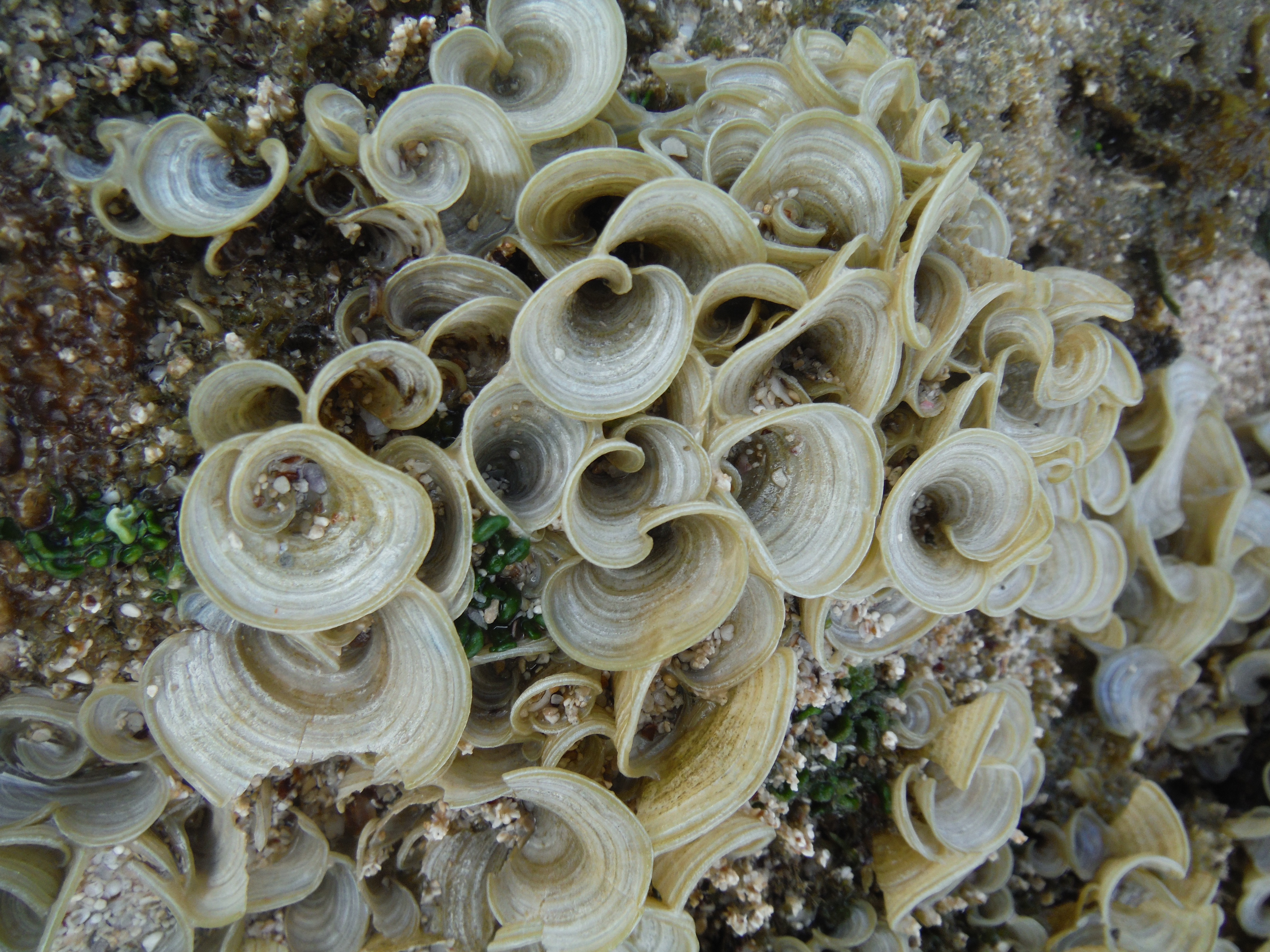
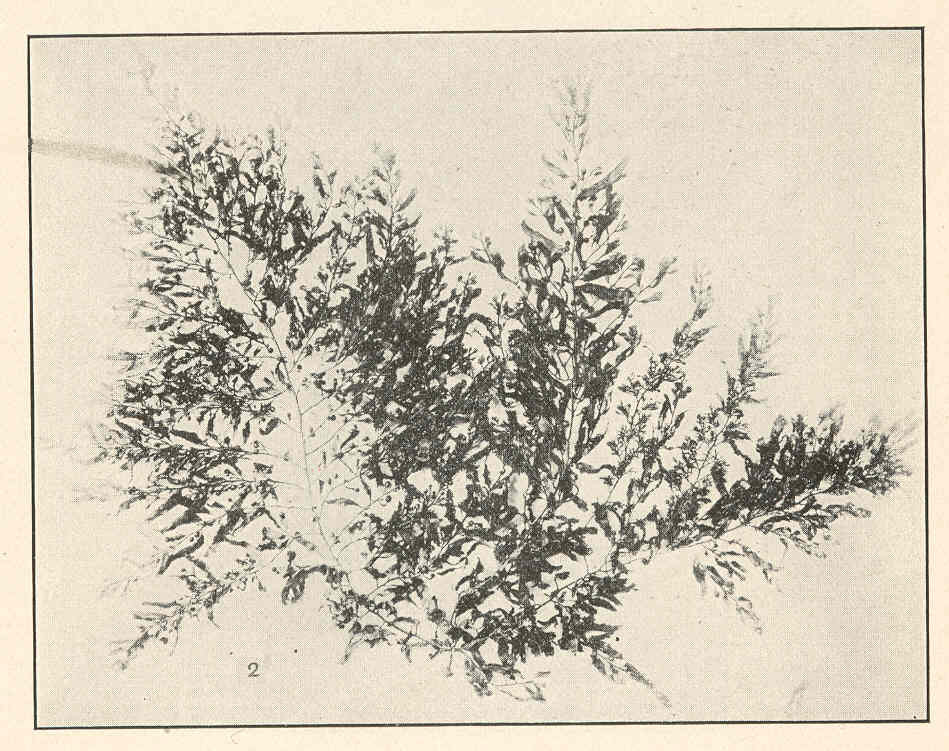
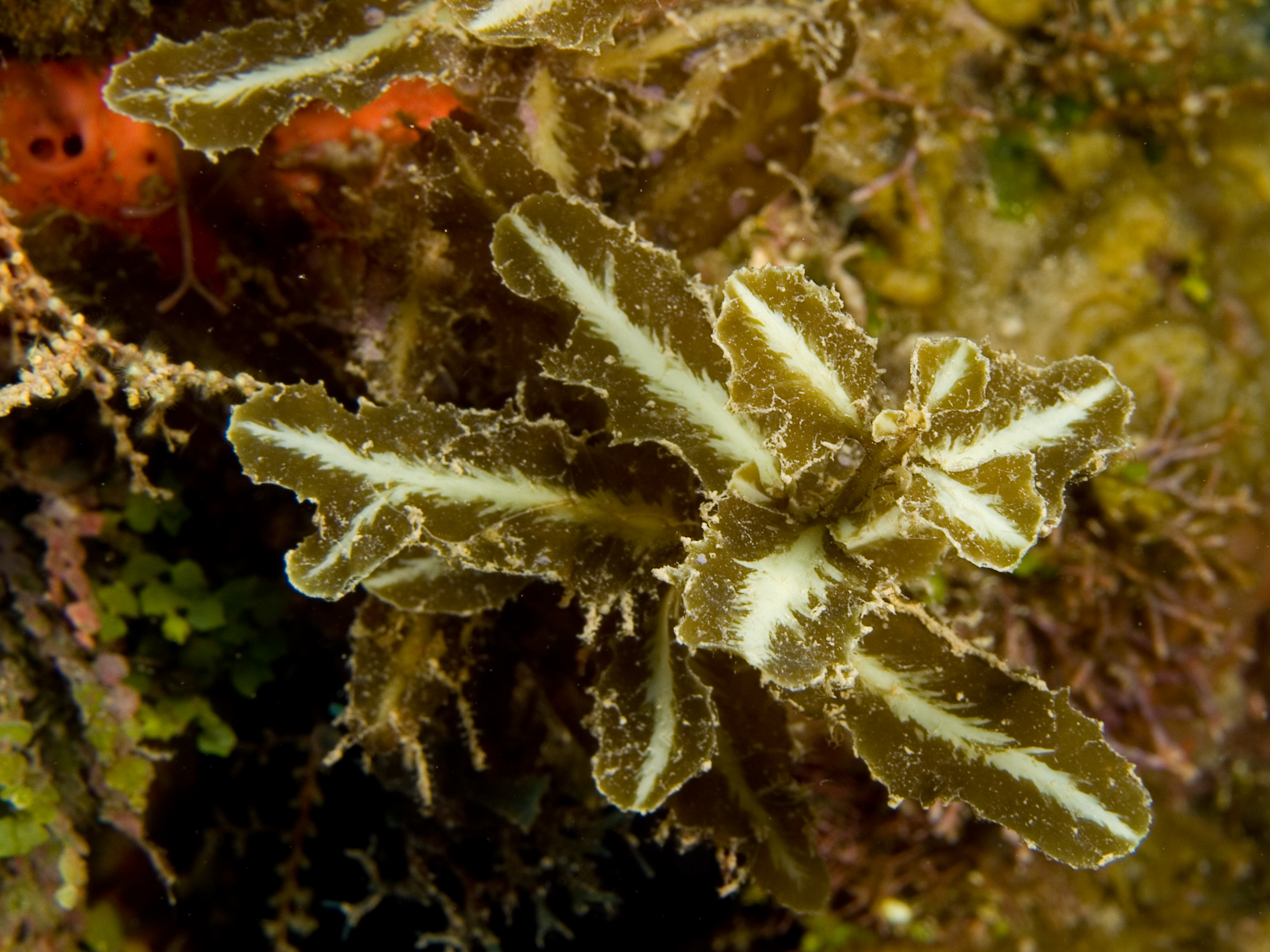
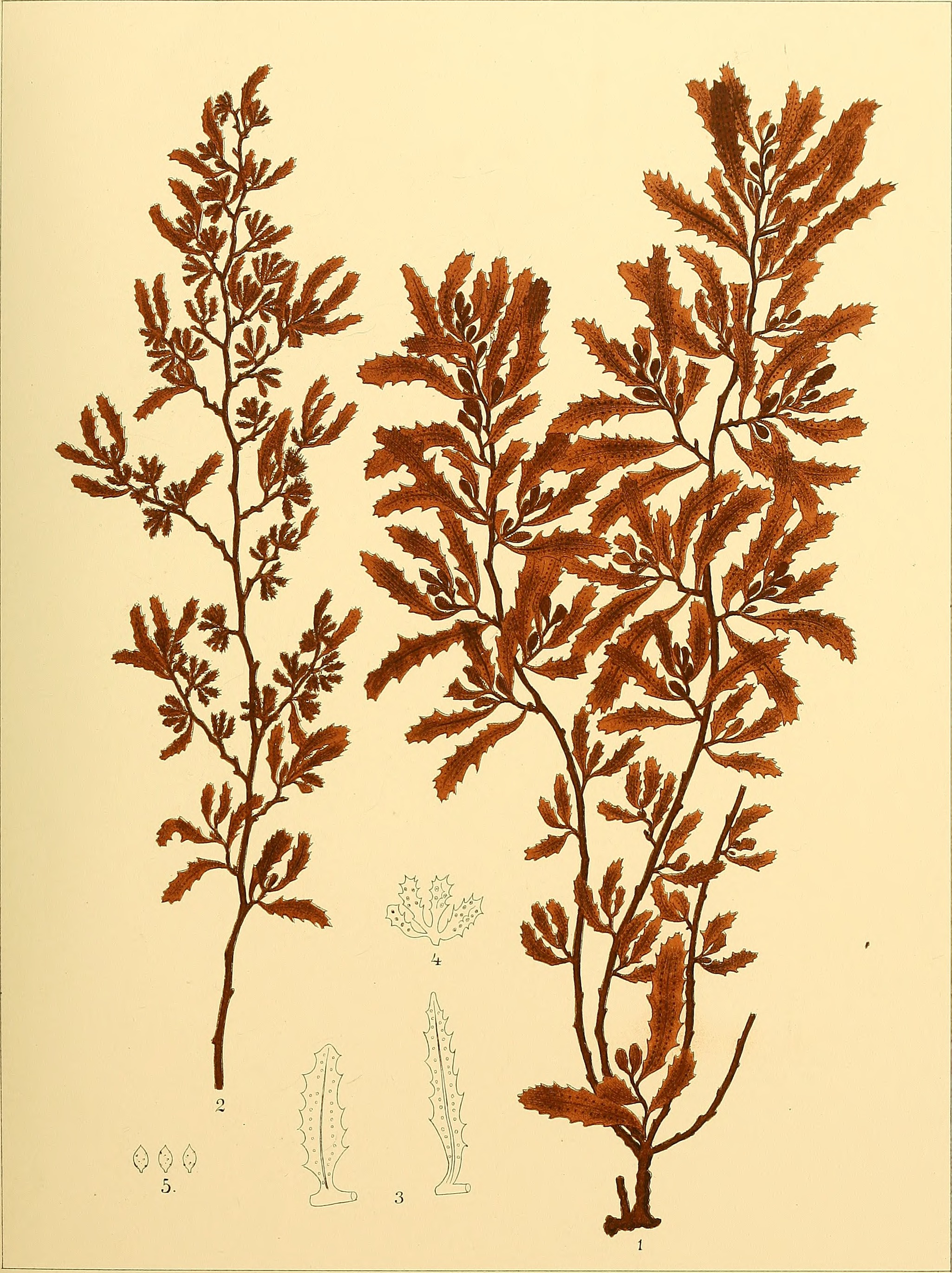
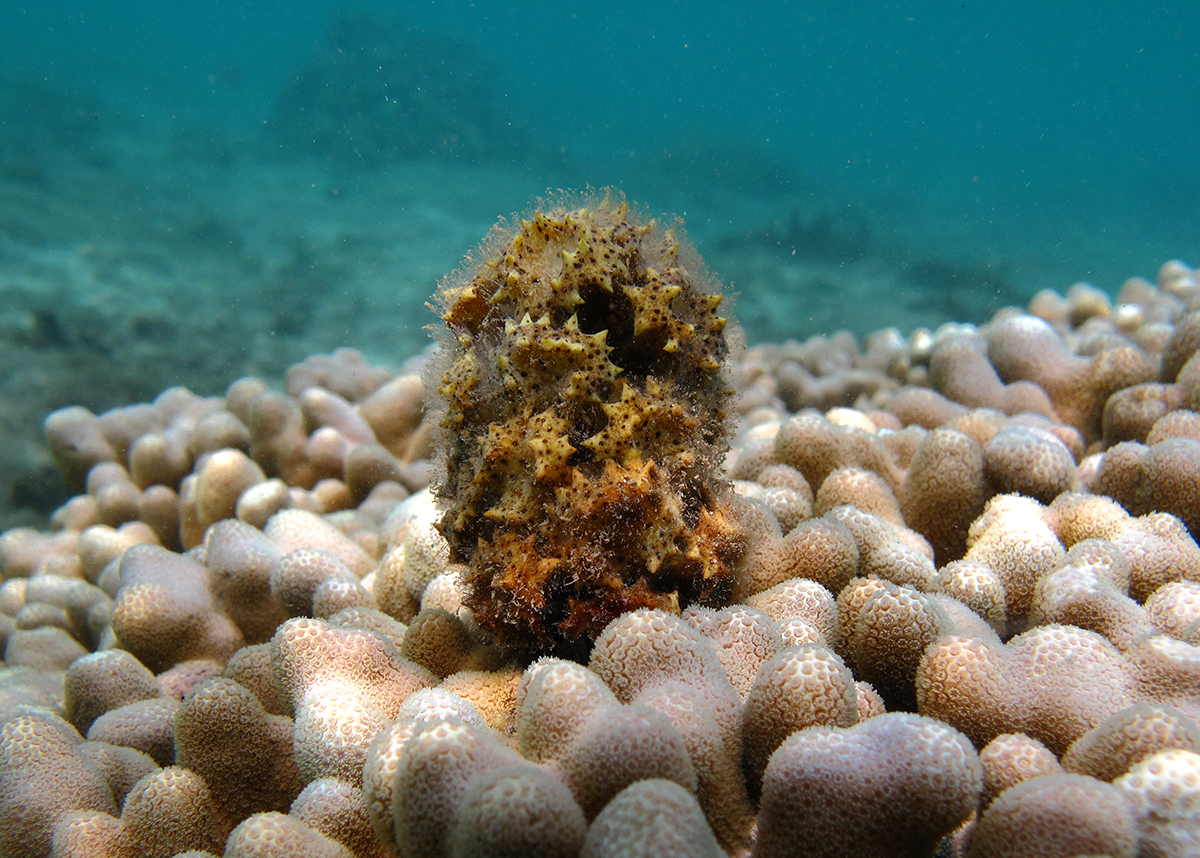
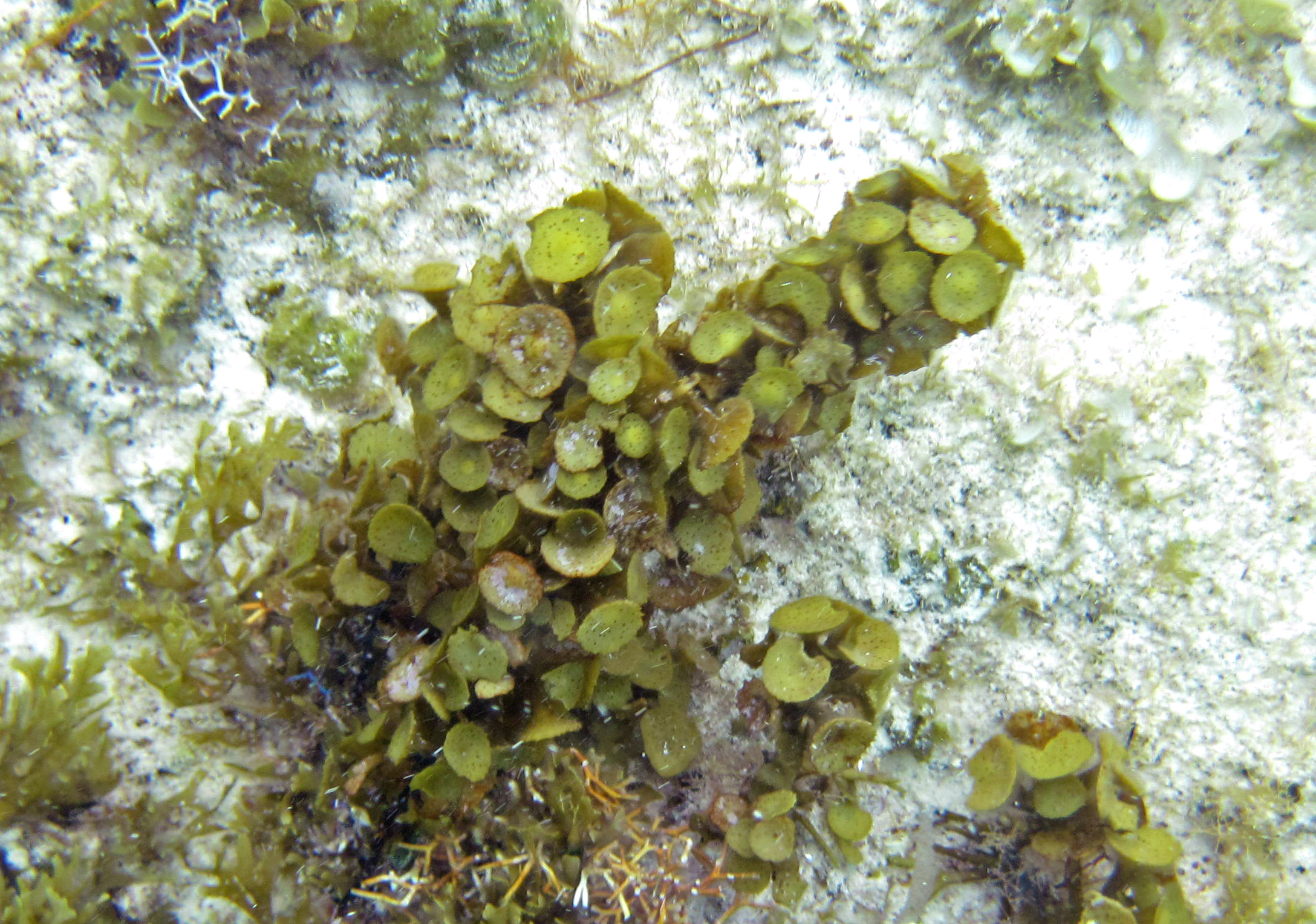
| Common name | Image | Taxonomy | Care Level | Growth rate | Nutrient uptake | Lighting | Waterflow | Palatable | Description | Max size |
|---|---|---|---|---|---|---|---|---|---|---|
| Brazilian brown alga | | Canistrocarpus cervicornis | Easy | Moderate | Good | Moderate-High | Moderate-High | Somewhat | This very hardy algae thrives in shallower waters. It features flat, spiraling blades which may or may not feature iridescence and vary from olive brown to gold in coloration. Though it does not grow very quickly, pruning is necessary to maintain an individual. Once known as Dictyota cervicornis. | 10 in (25.4 cm) |
| False sargasso | | Cystoseira sp. | Moderate | Slow | Fair | Moderate-High | Moderate-High | No | A rare algae in the aquarium trade, commonly confused with Sargassum which has flat blades while False Sargasso has tight toothlike appendages. It also has lower nutrient requirements due to its smaller size. Characterized by its stiff stipes, the outermost of which support pneumatocysts, and its light brown coloration. | 18 in (45.7 cm) |
| Iridescent algae | | Dictyota sp. | Moderate | Moderate | Good | Moderate-High | Moderate-High | Somewhat | The appearance of species within this genus varies greatly. Some display blue iridescence while others are a dull olive color. Larger bladed species are desirable as smaller ones can become invasive. However, all grow in clumps (on hard surfaces or as epiphytes) and are quite delicate, being known to clog pumps and filters. In the wild, the algae is abundant in the intertidal zone and shallow reef flats. Manual removal and clean up crew, like Longnose decorator crabs, can be used to combat this algae | 12 in (30.5 cm) |
| Encrusting fan-leaf algae | | Lobophora sp. | Moderate | Moderate | Good | Low-Moderate | Low-Moderate | Somewhat | This algae is very similar to Scroll algae although it is not calcified, being rubbery to the touch. It comes in various shades of brown and green and because it comes from deep waters, it requires little lighting. Rarely does it enter aquariums, which usually occurs when it hitchhikes on live rock. Surprisingly, the algae has a rhizoidal holdfast despite seeming to primarily encrust. | 10 in (25.4 cm) |
| Scroll algae | | Padina sp. | Expert | Slow | Fair | Moderate-High | Moderate-High | No | Also known as Potato algae, it is quite desirable given its beauty, which may be enhanced if Coralline algae is allowed to encrust its surface. The algae itself features green to brown coloration and grows in the shape of a rounded or split, irregular cup with concentric rings. Its single holdfast should be affixed to a hard bottom and calcium supplementation is required for growth as it is calcified. | 6 in (15.2 cm) |
| White scroll algae | | Padina sanctae-crucis | Expert | Slow | Fair | Moderate-High | Moderate-High | No | This species of algae, also known as Peacock algae, is the most common of the Padina genus in the aquarium trade. It often enters aquariums on live rock. | ~6 in (15.2 cm) |
| Brown algae | | Polycladia myrica | Moderate | Slow | Fair | Moderate-High | Moderate-High | No | This algae makes seasonal appearances in the aquarium trade and originates from The Bahamas and Florida. Once known as Cystoseira myrica. |
| Gulfweed | | Sargassum filipendula | Expert | | | | | | This algae is naturally found on both sides of the Atlantic Ocean, and serves as habitat for a variety of marine animals. Because it features pneumatocysts, individual specimens will float without a holdfast. Additionally, it should only be attempted by advanced aquarists. Also known as Sargassum weed. | 79 in (200.7 cm) |
| White-vein sargasso | | Sargassum hystrix | Expert | Slow | Fair | High | Moderate-High | Not really | This species is tolerable of cooler temperatures than most other macroalgae. It attaches itself to hard surfaces, using a holdfast, in shallow, turbulent environments and keeps itself upright with a sturdy stipe. The algae grows large, brown blades and a variety known as Sargassum hystrix buxifolium exists, lacking a white-colored mid rib. | 24 in (61.0 cm) |
| Deep-toothed gulfweed | | Sargassum platycarpum | Expert | Slow | Fair | High | Moderate-High | Not really | This species extends serrated, golden blades from its thick stipes along with pneumatocysts to hold it upright. Individuals may also grow a holdfast and the ones that do are most suitable for aquariums as they are capable of anchoring themselves. It is often found on live rock and should frequently be pruned. | 30 in (76.2 cm) |
| Leafy flat-blade algae | | Stypopodium zonale | Moderate | | | Moderate | | | This species of algae produces highly toxic extracts that are harmless toward smaller grazers including amphipods and polychaetes yet are capable of killing herbivorous reef fish. Death occurs within 10 hours of the algae's introduction to a well-aerated aquarium during which the fish will attempt to jump out. | 8 in (20.3 cm) |
| Pyramid seaweed | | Turbinaria sp. | Expert | Slow | Fair | High | Moderate-High | To some fish | This tough macroalgae is rubbery to the touch, features toothed, triangular blades, and anchors itself to substrate using a holdfast. It is quite variable, with some individuals growing in short, tight clusters while others feature a tall stipe. It prefers to be placed near the top of an aquarium, becoming quite hardy in the presence of strong flow and lighting. | 2 in (5.1 cm) |

== Green macroalgae ==
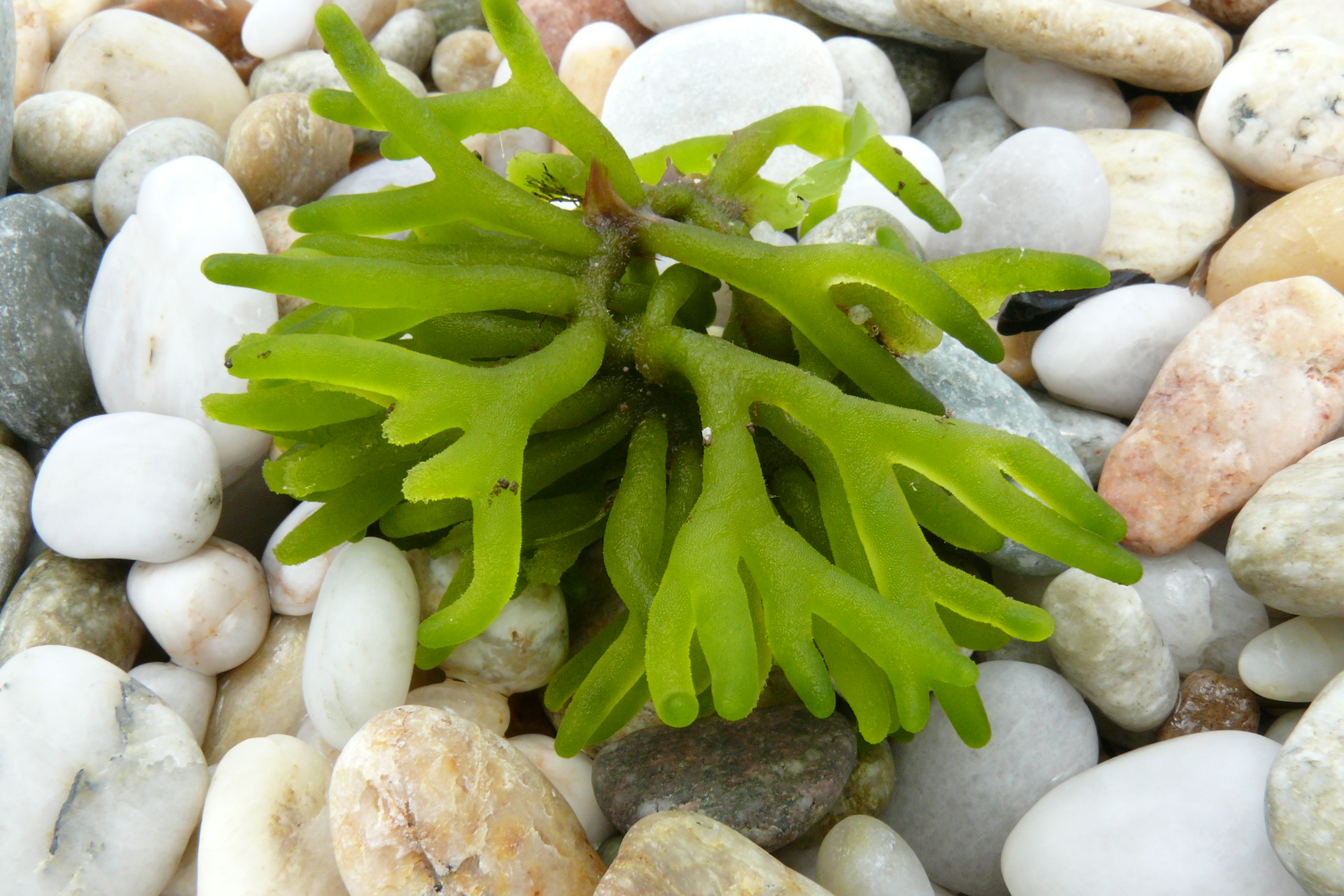
Dead man's fingers

Green macroalgae are extremely diverse and abundant, coming in a wide variety of shapes. They possess the pigment Chlorophyll which gives them their coloration ranging from bright green to yellow or dark jade. Reproduction via fragmentation or the releasing of spores are utilized by this macroalgae group. The second option, which is used by the genus, Caulerpa, can be quite problematic in an aquarium. Some species of green macroalgae have greater ease surviving in high nutrient environments or inadequate water parameters than other kinds of macroalgae and are generally the most suitable for nutrient removal due to their rapid growth rates.

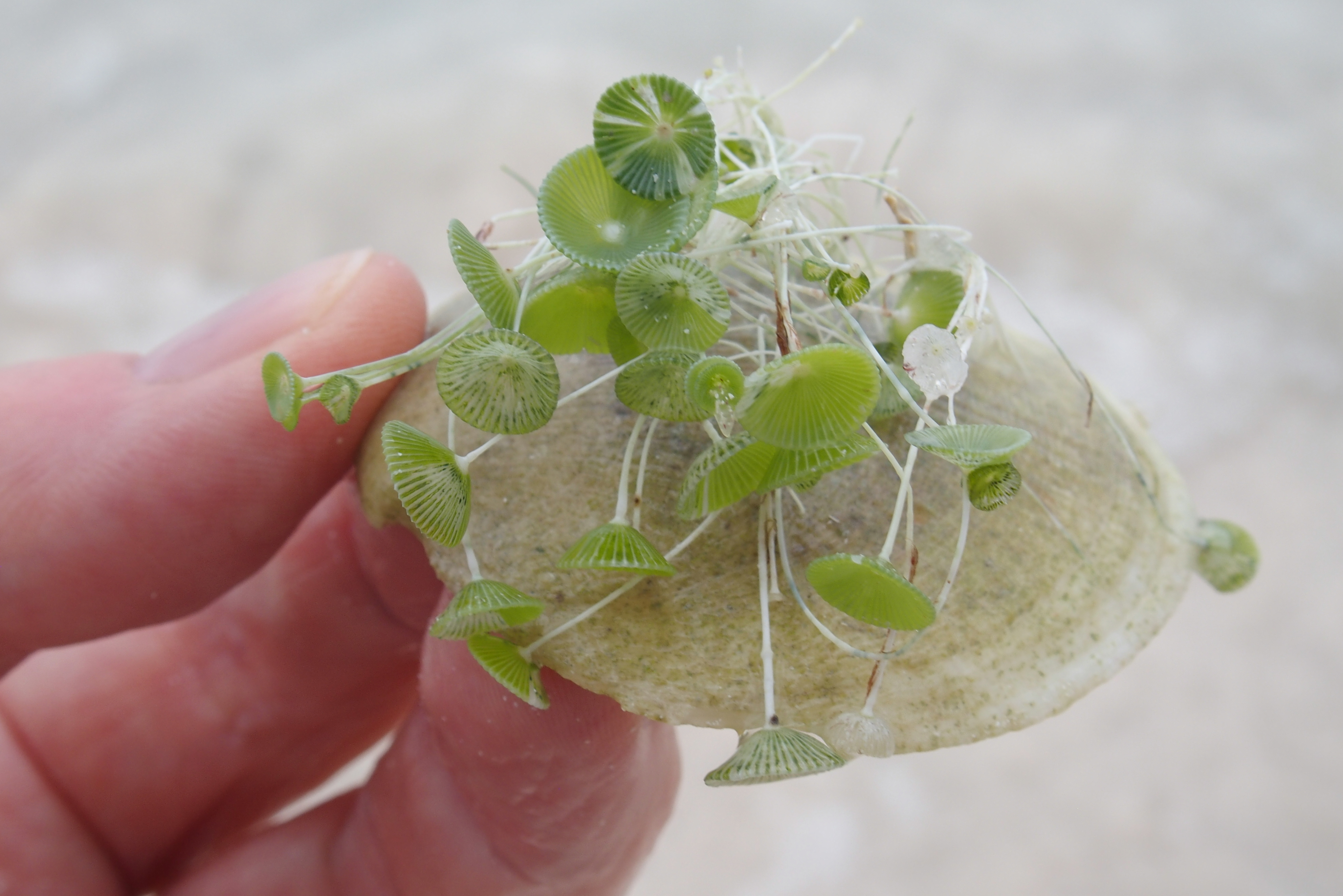
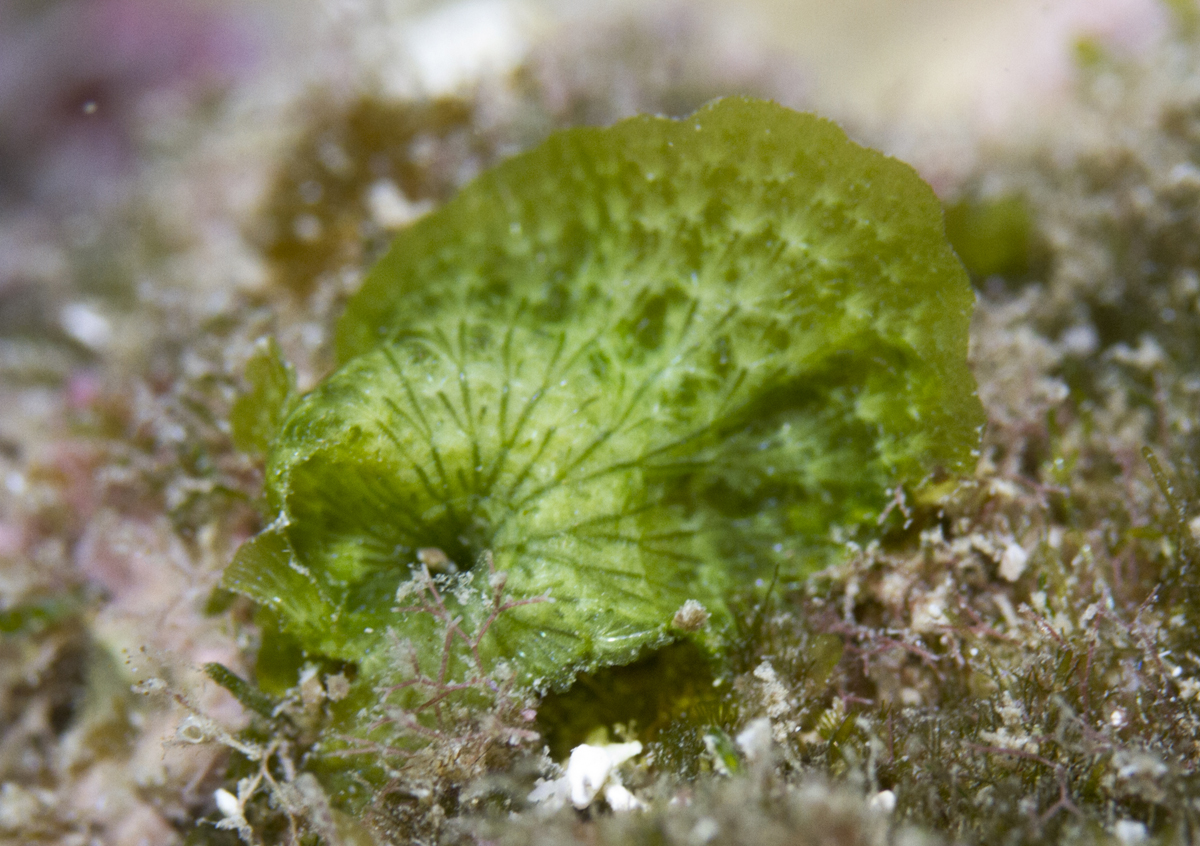
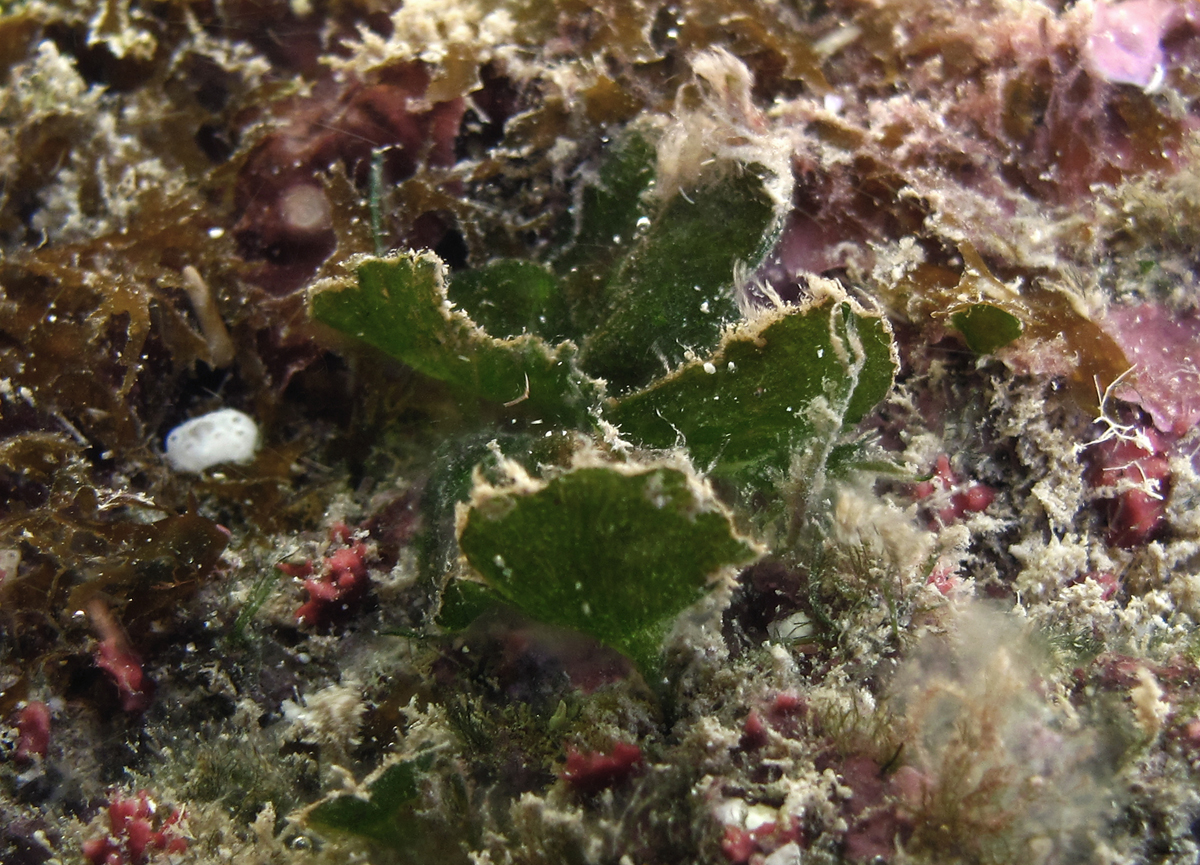
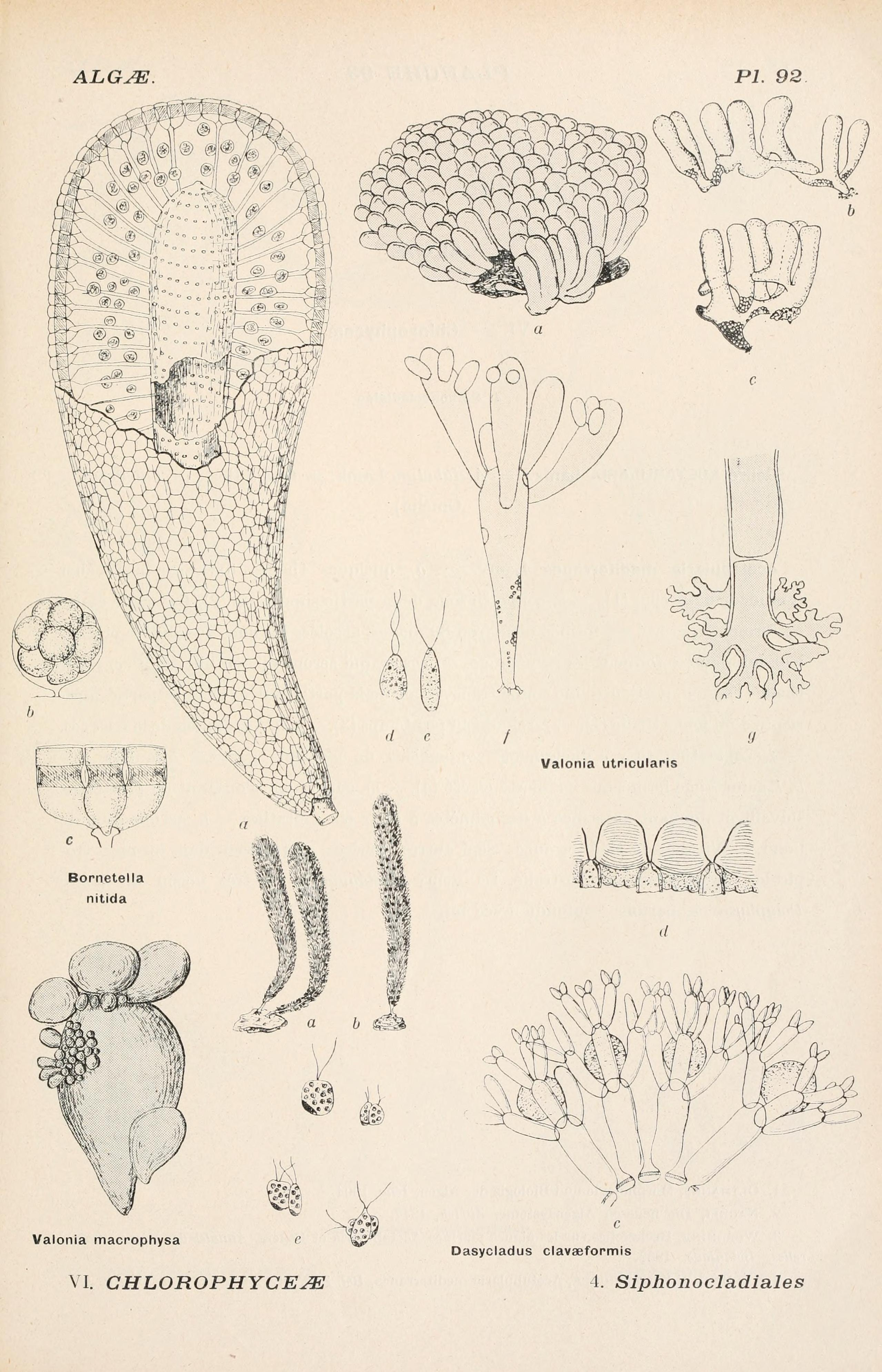
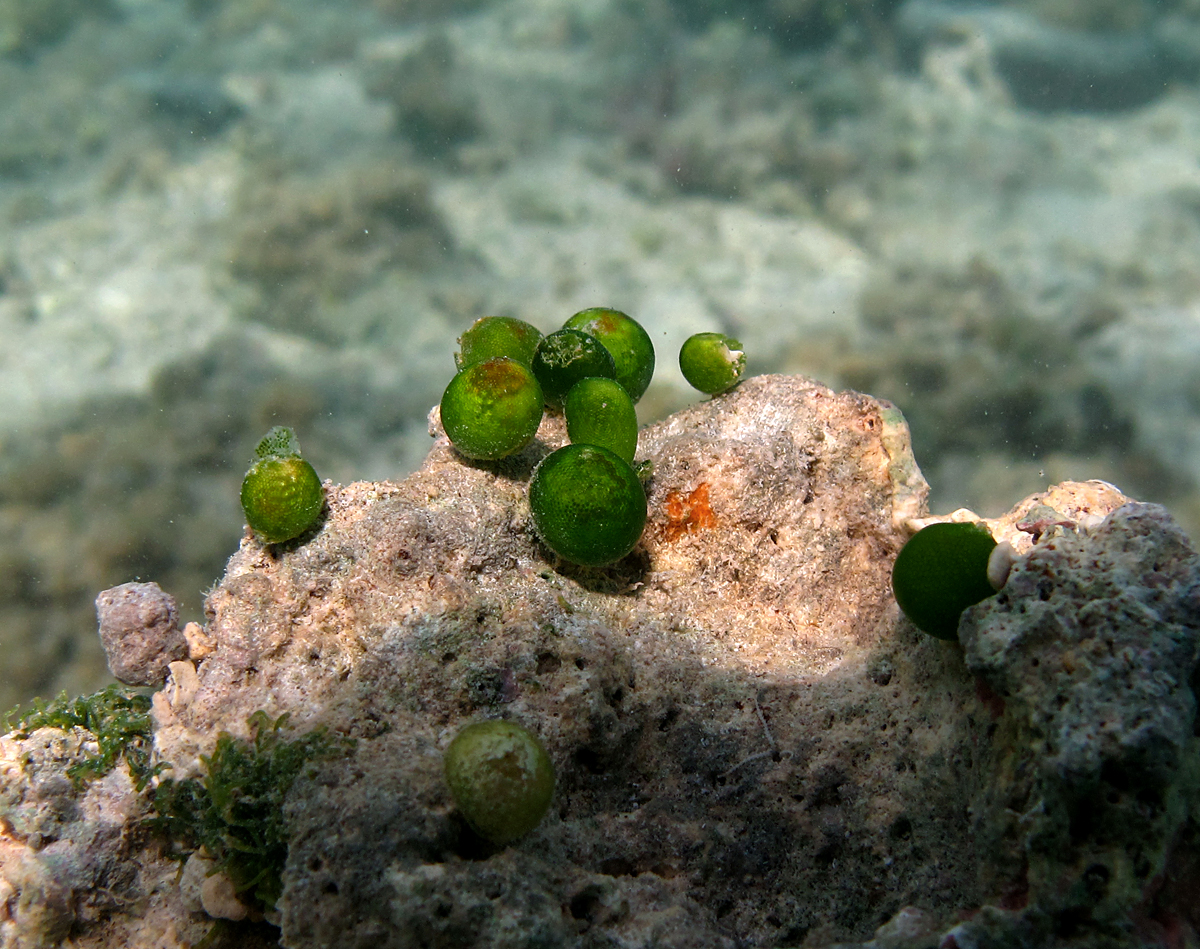
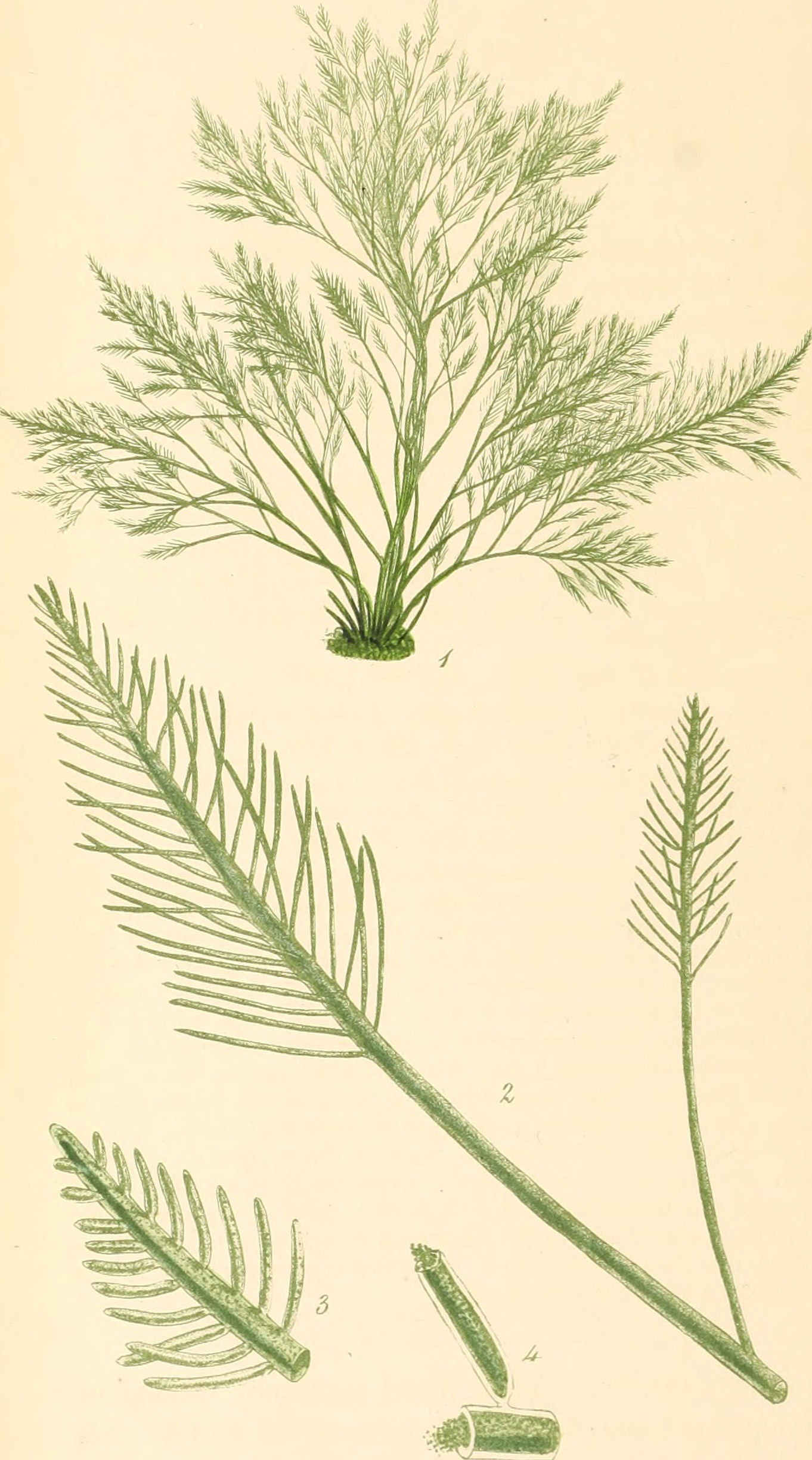
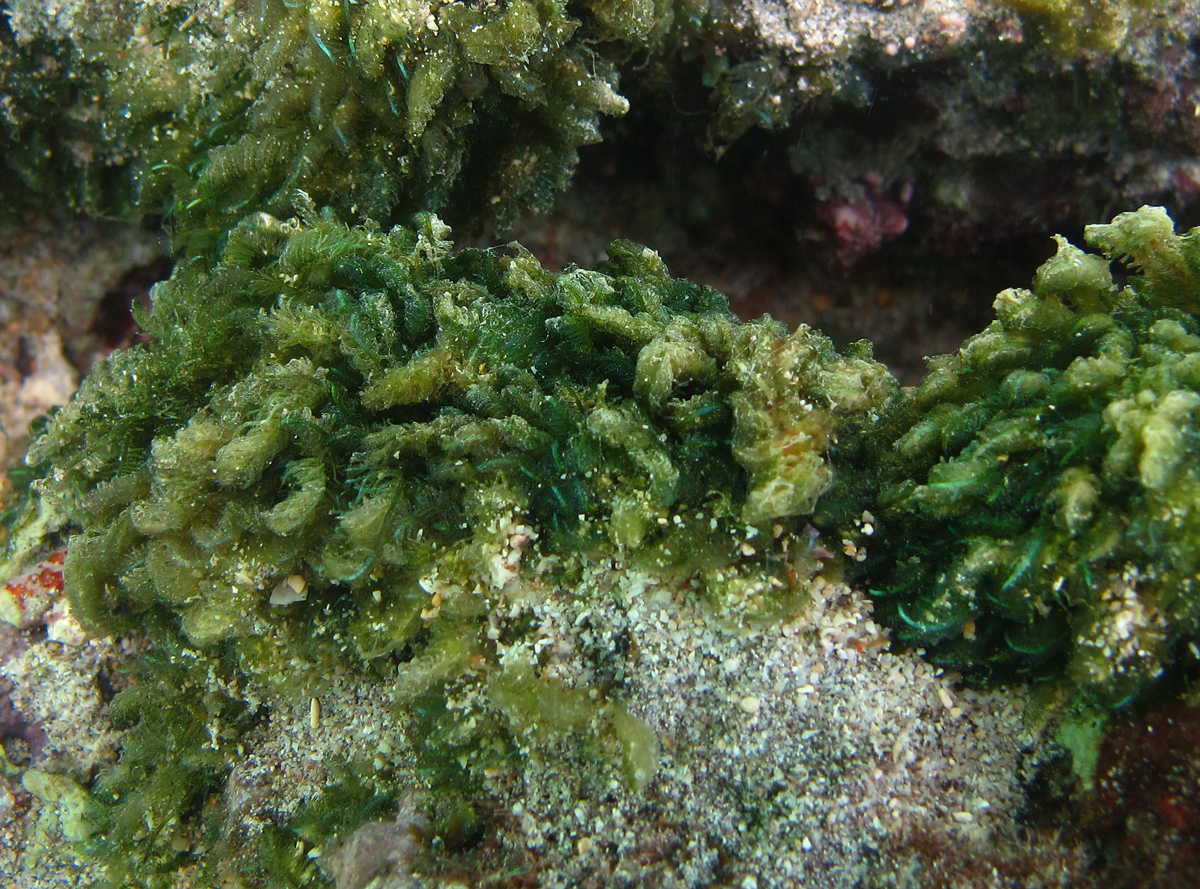
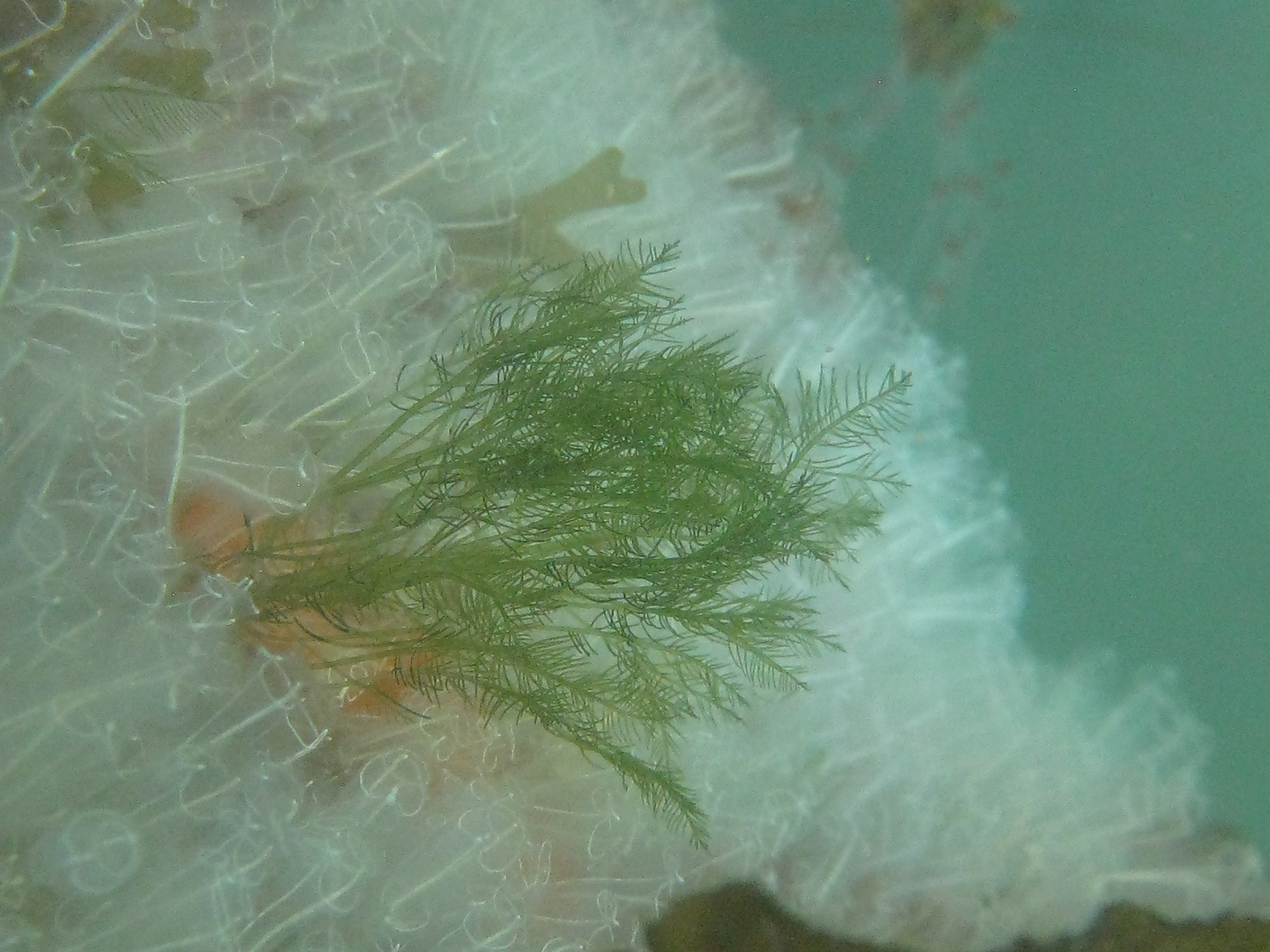
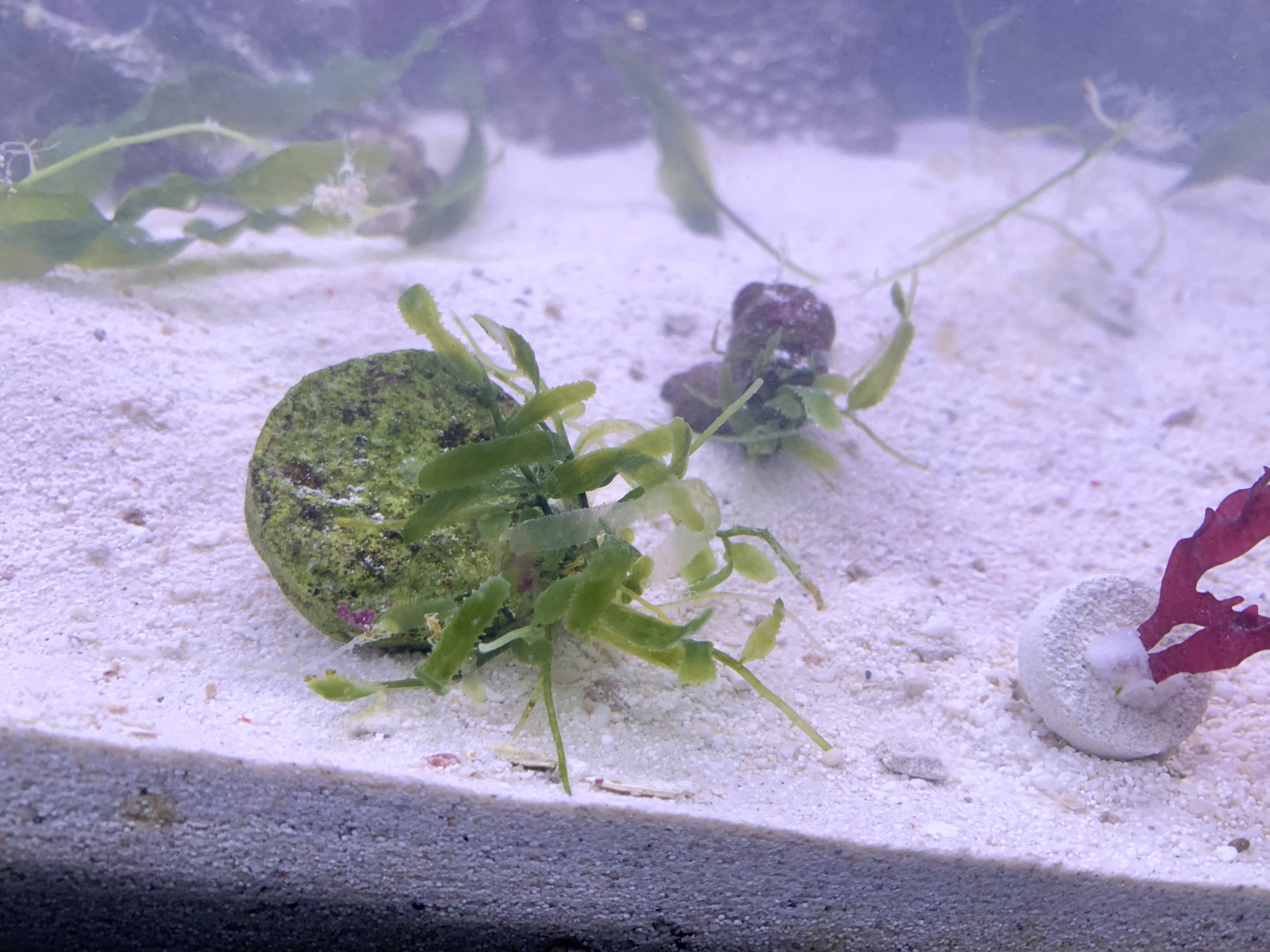
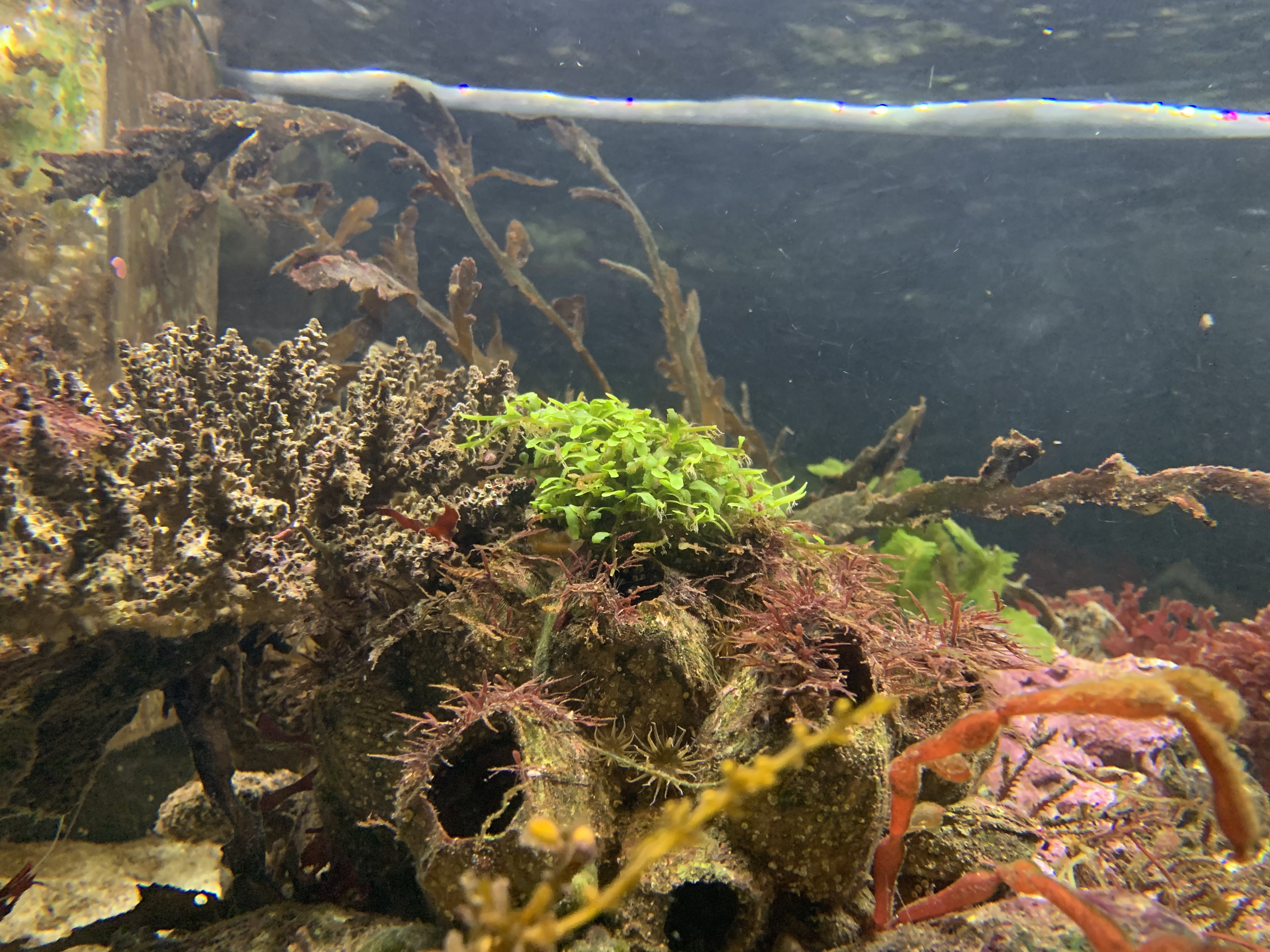
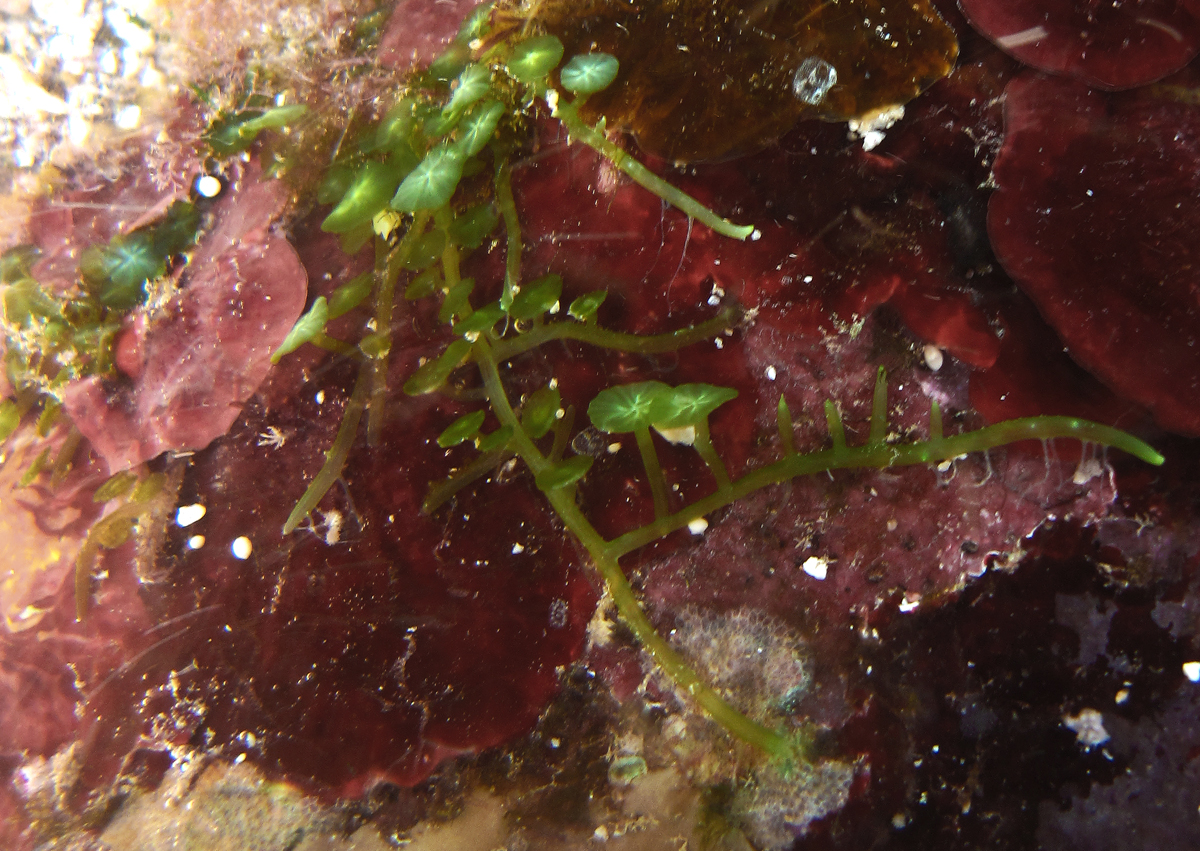
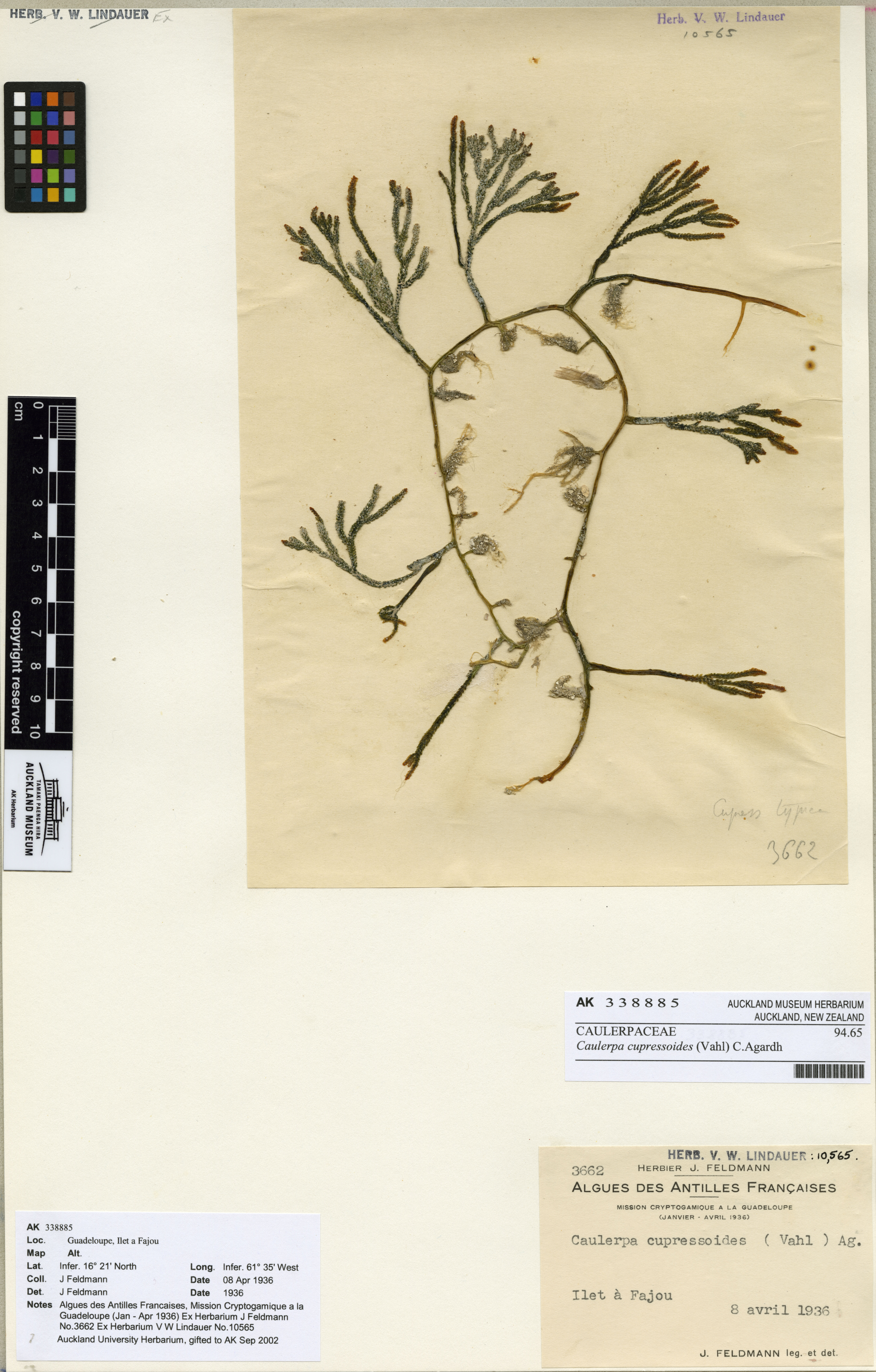
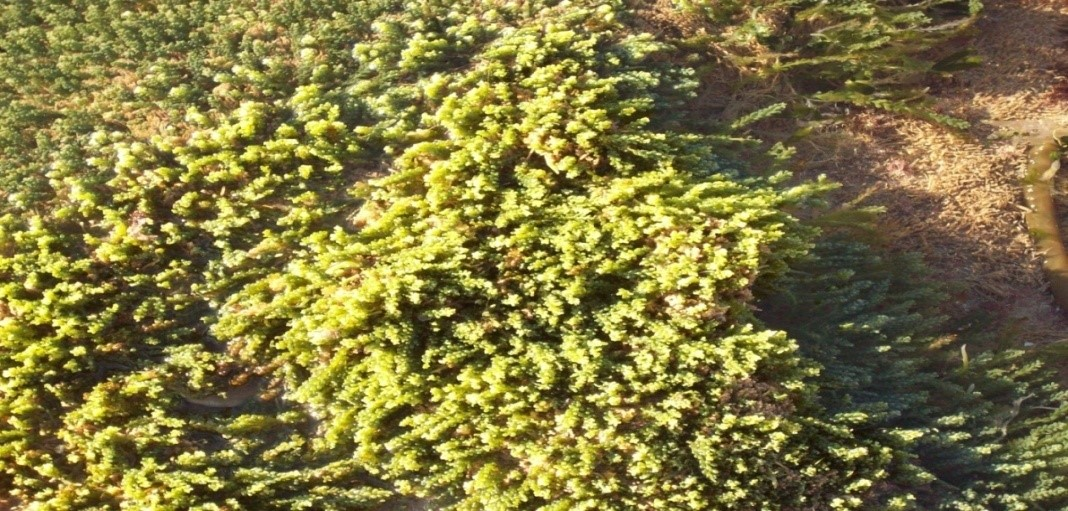
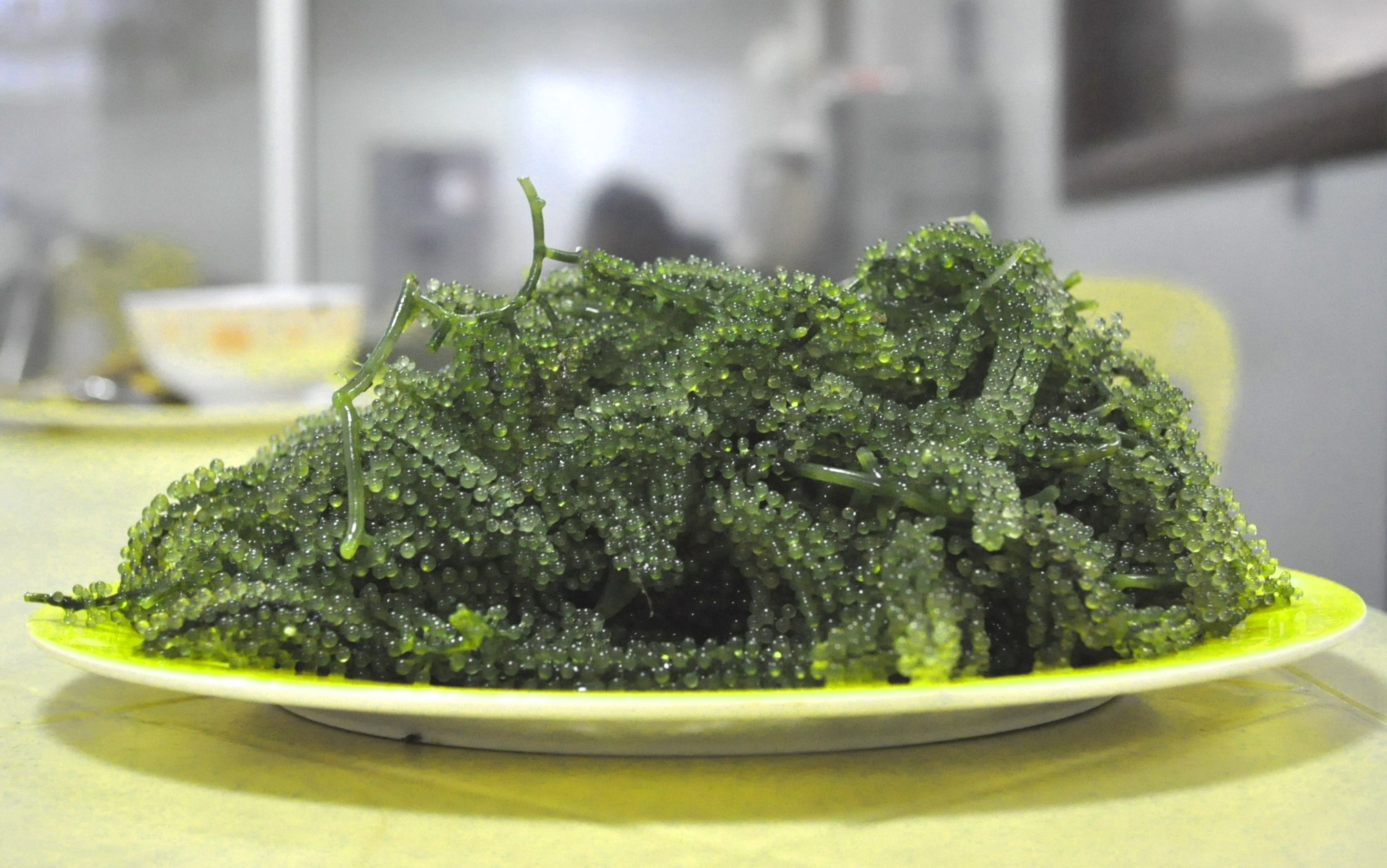
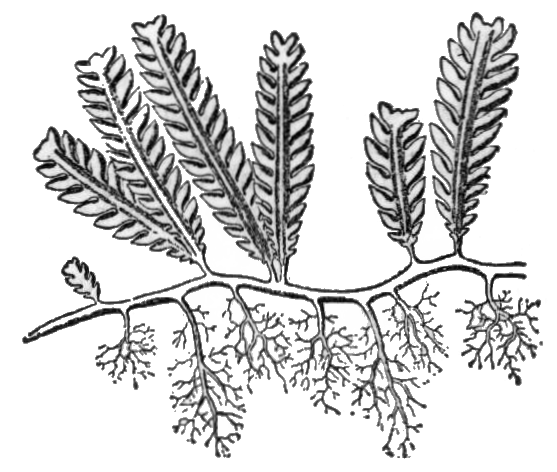
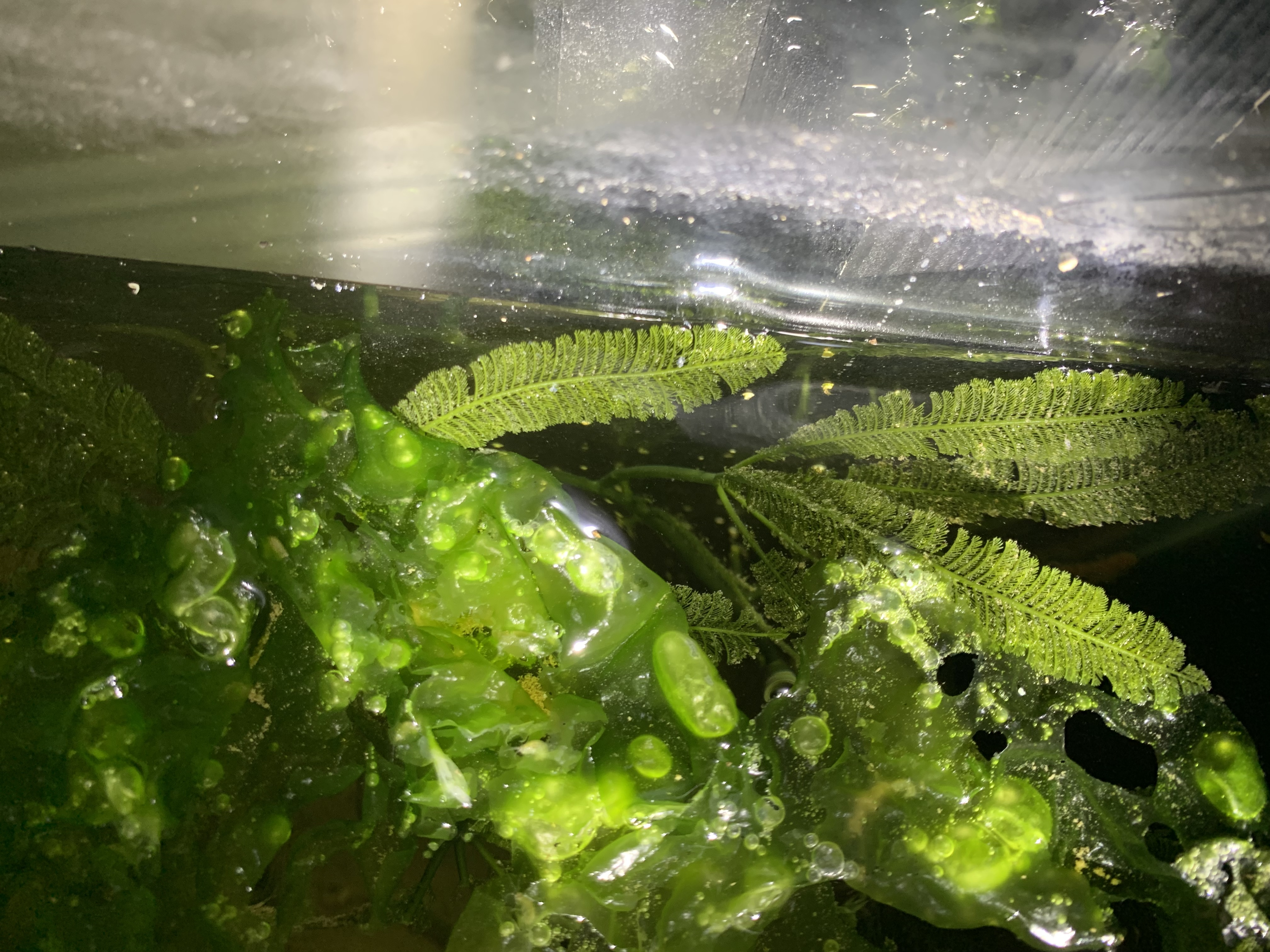
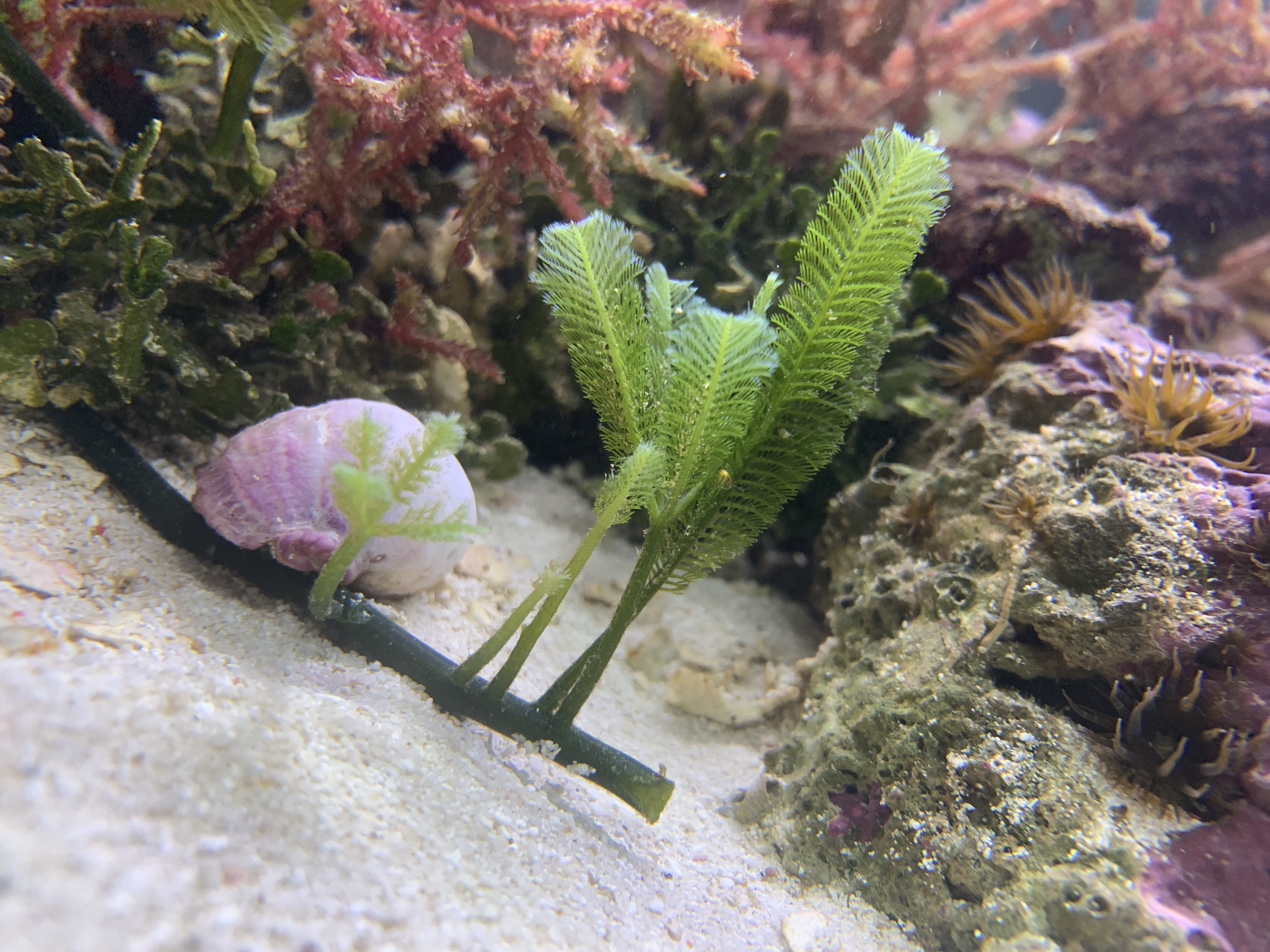
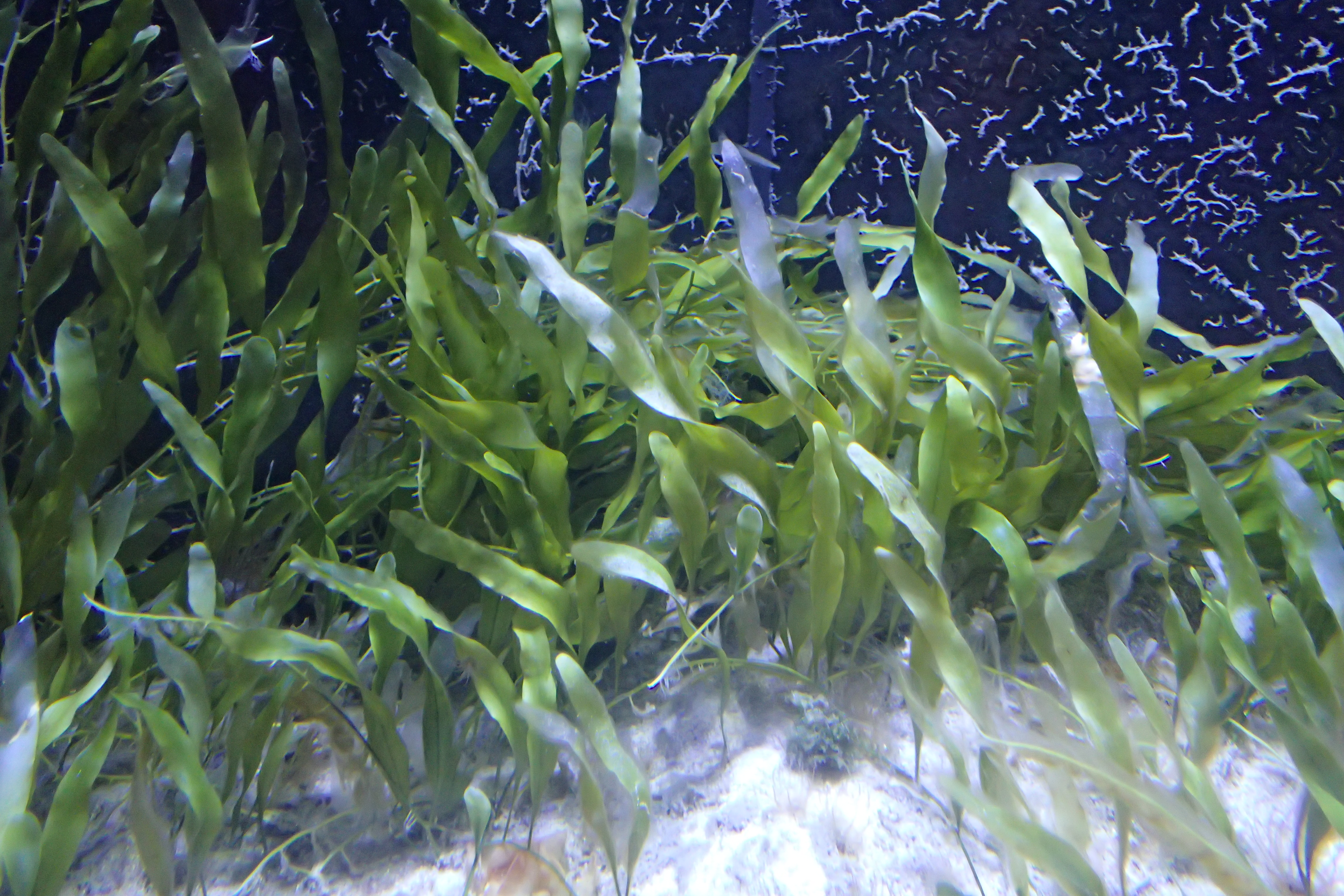
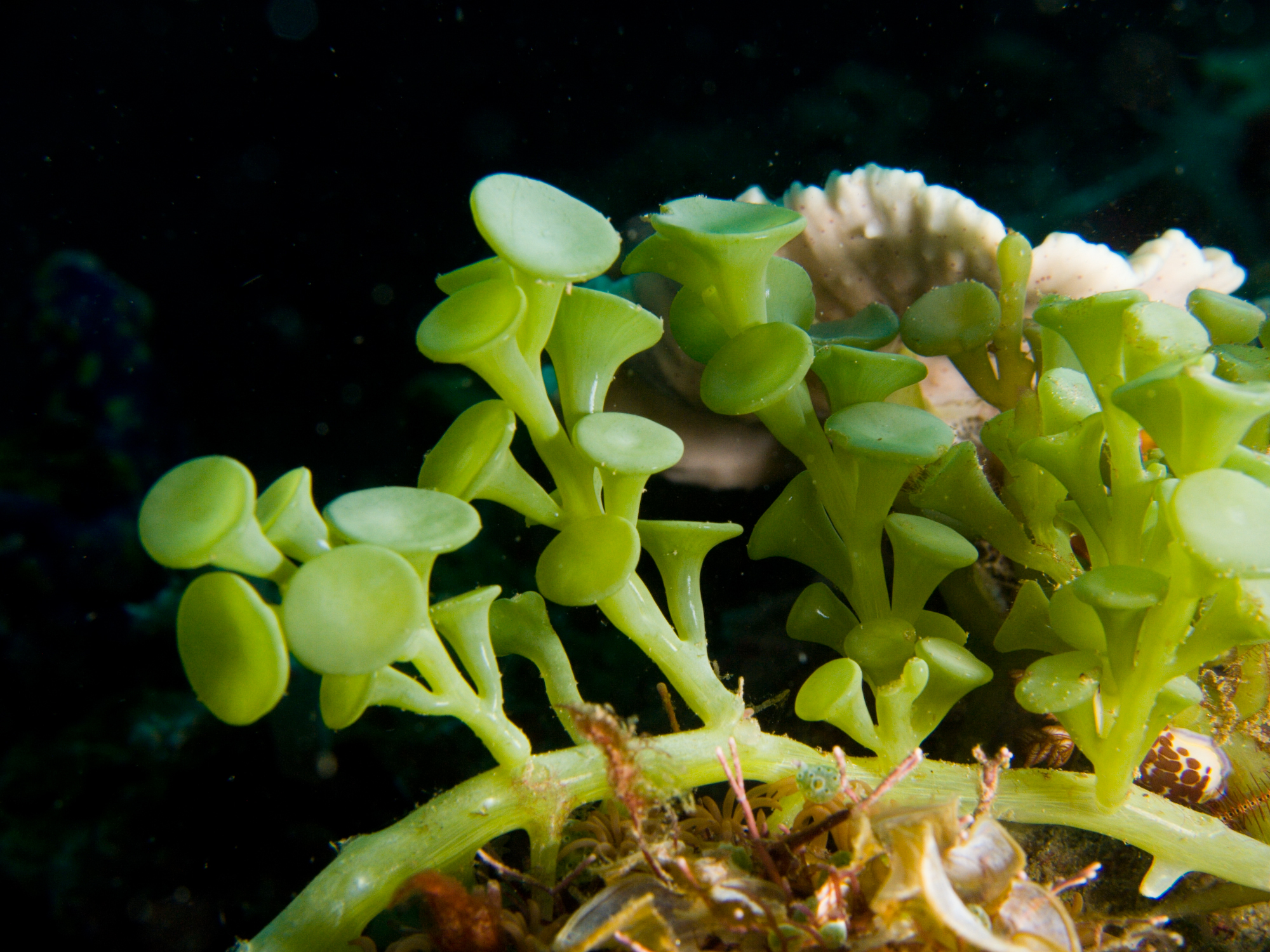
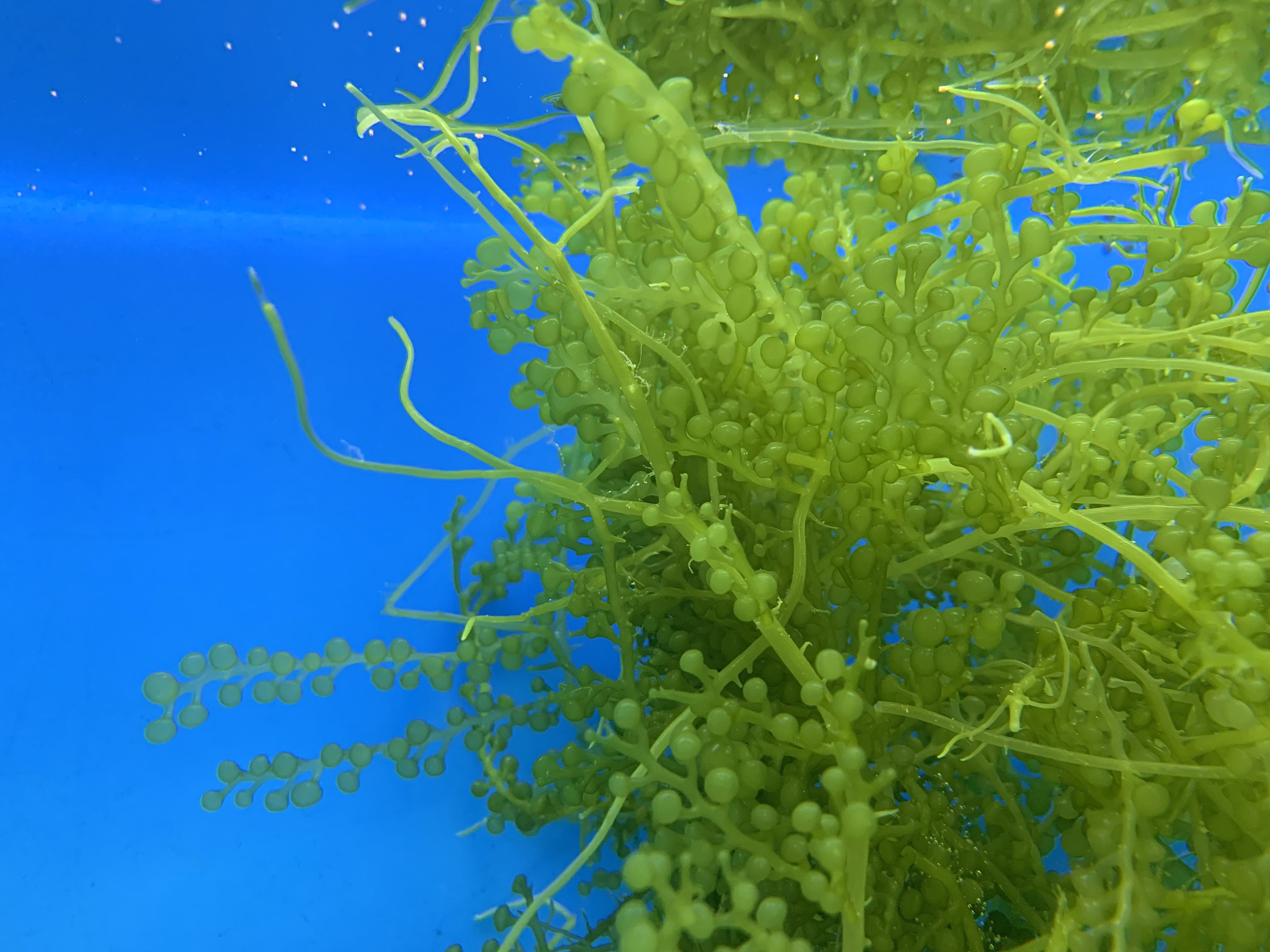
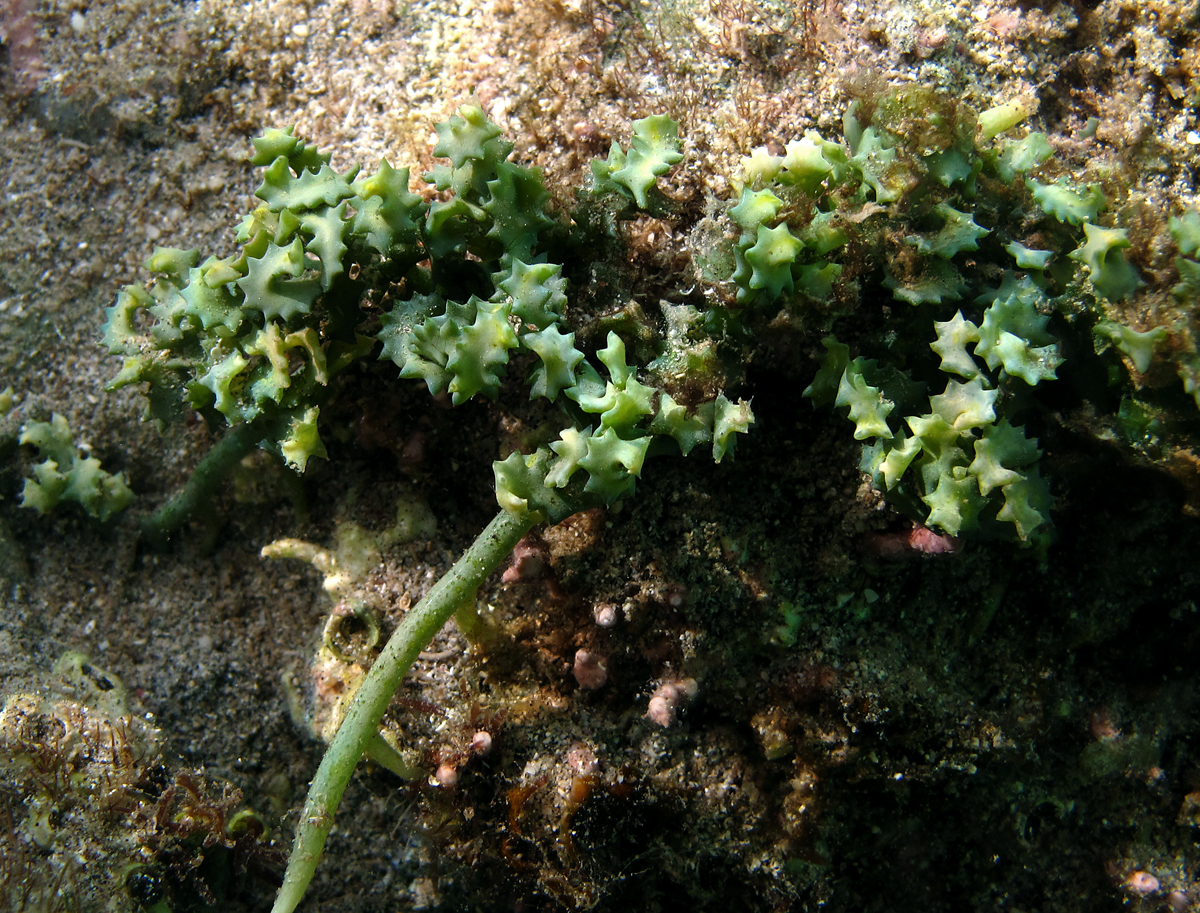
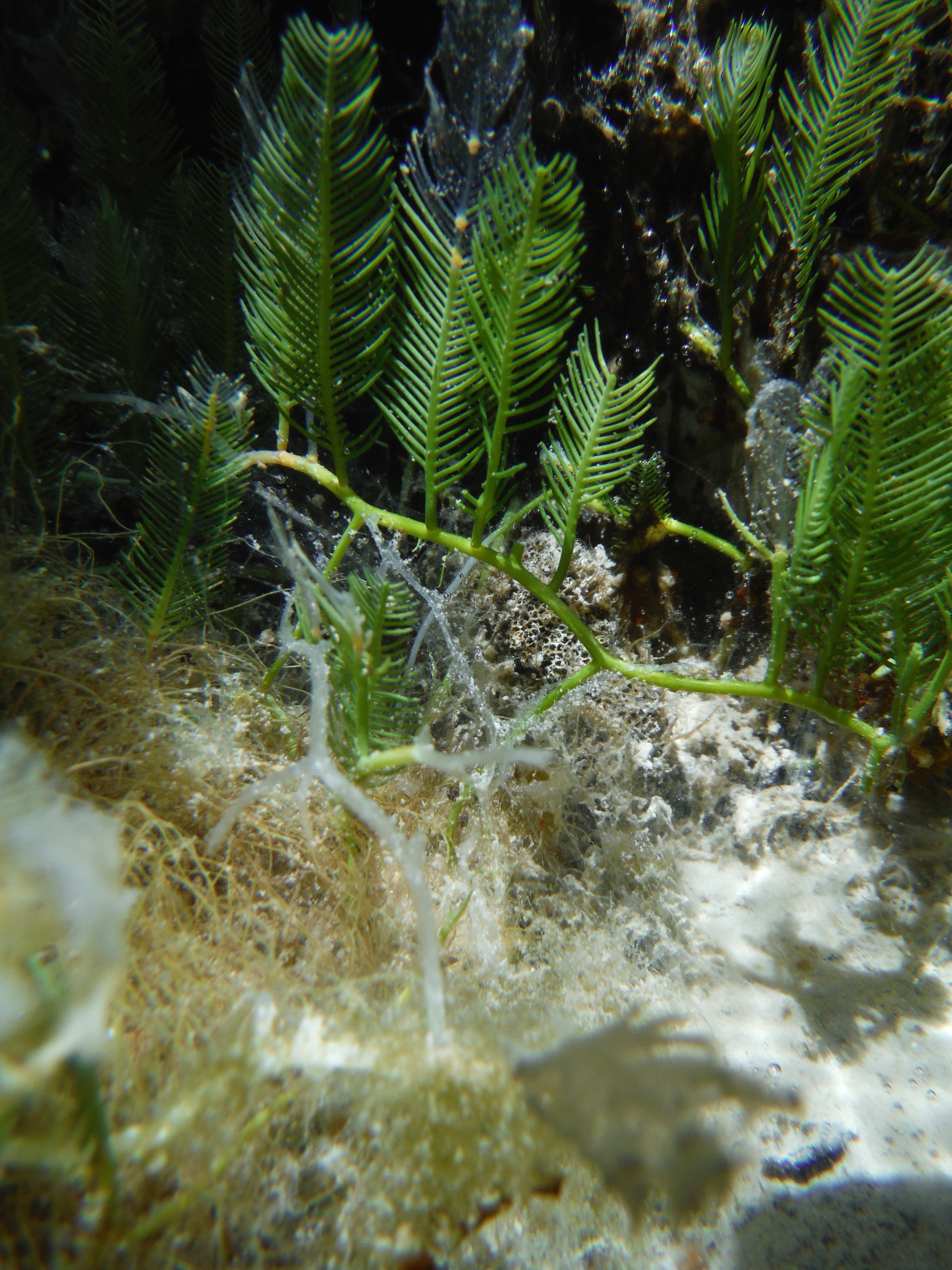
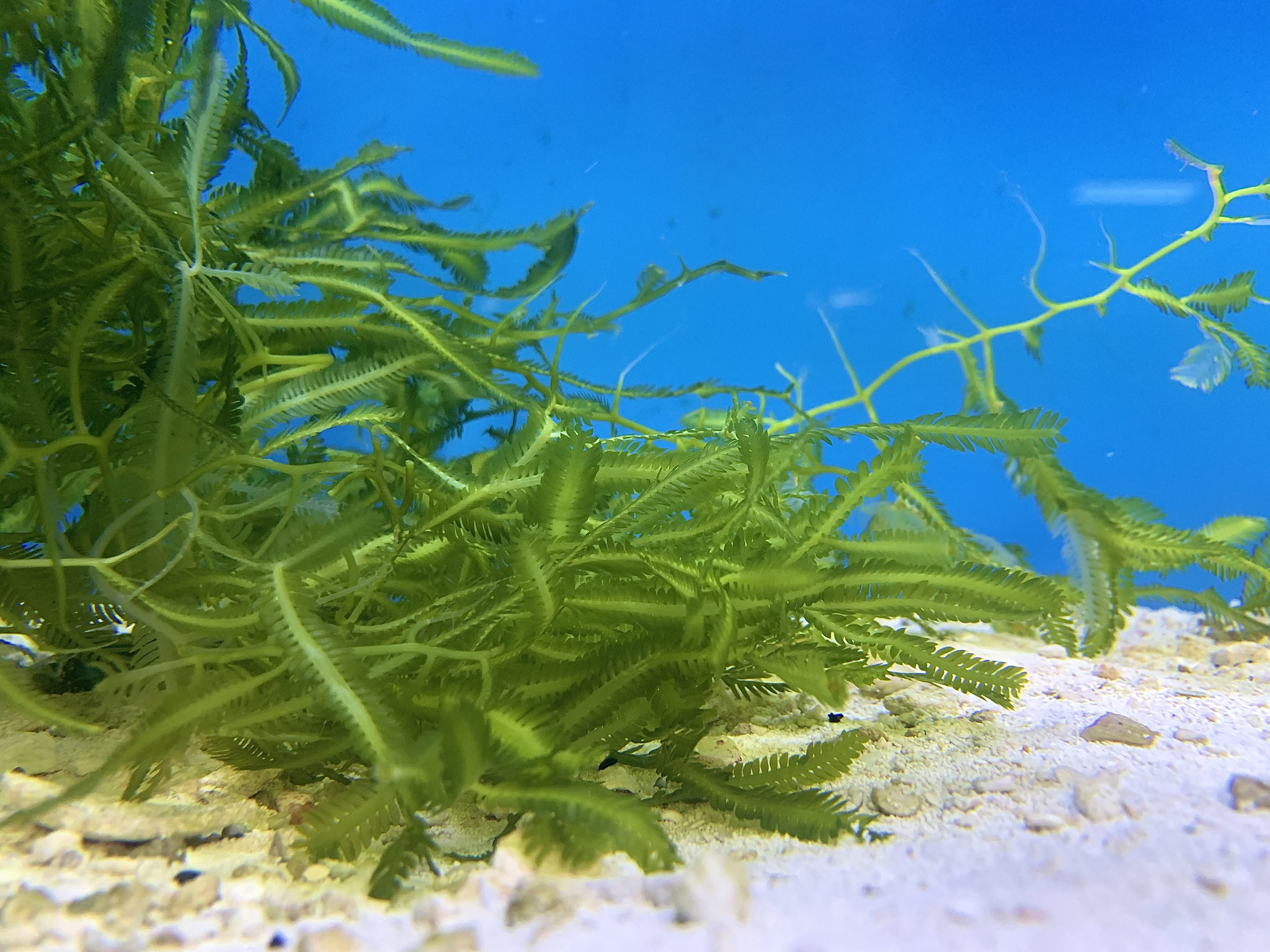
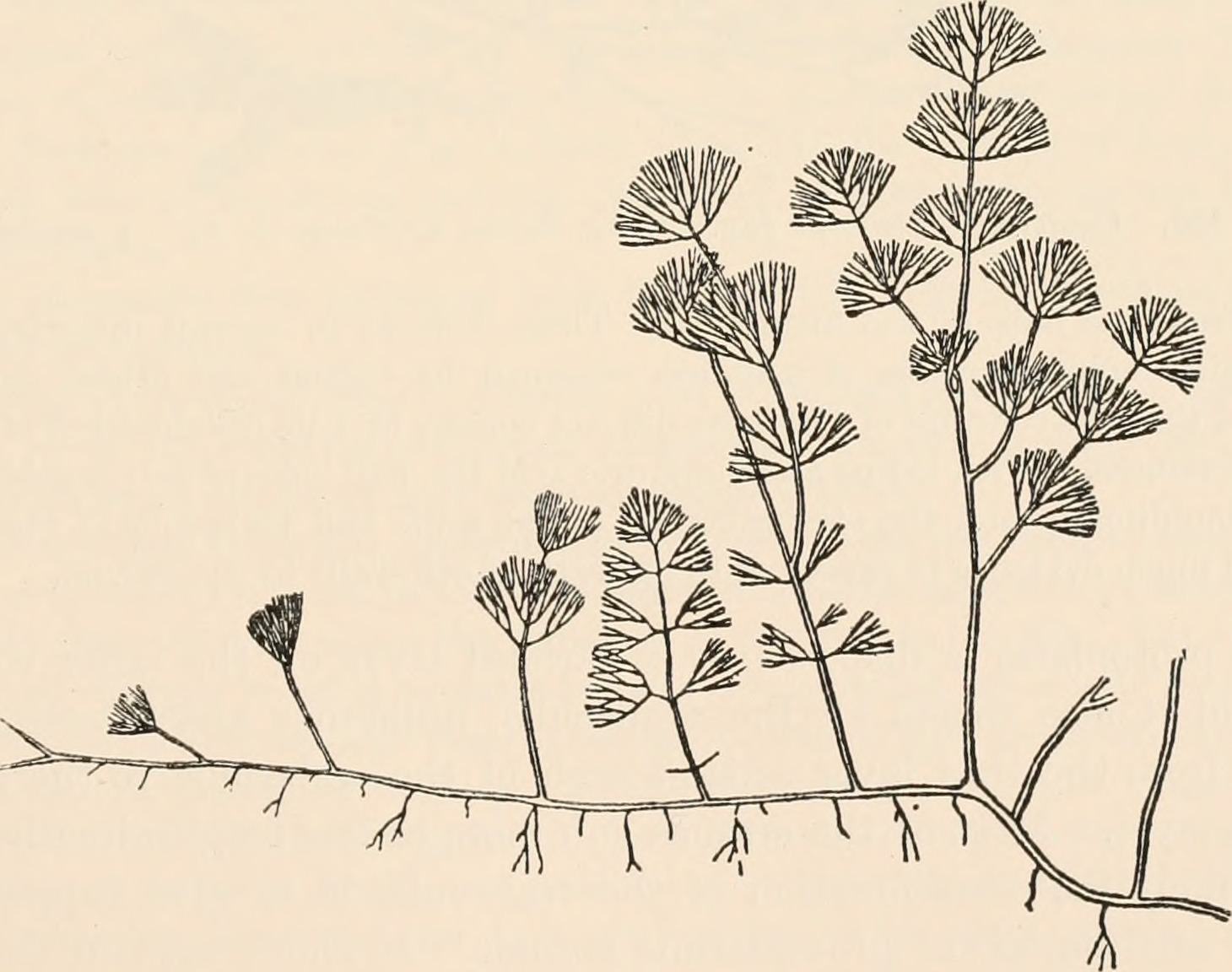
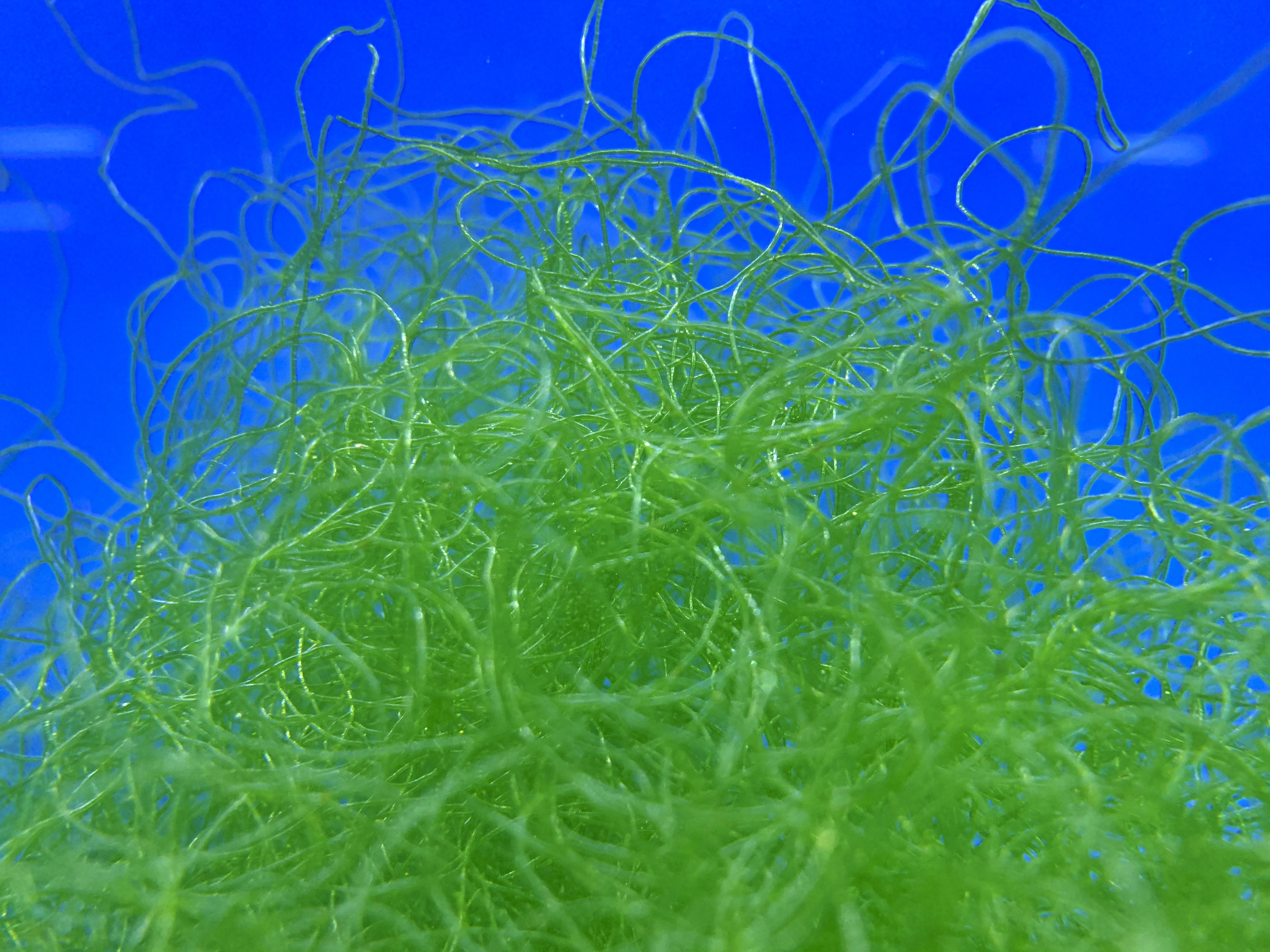
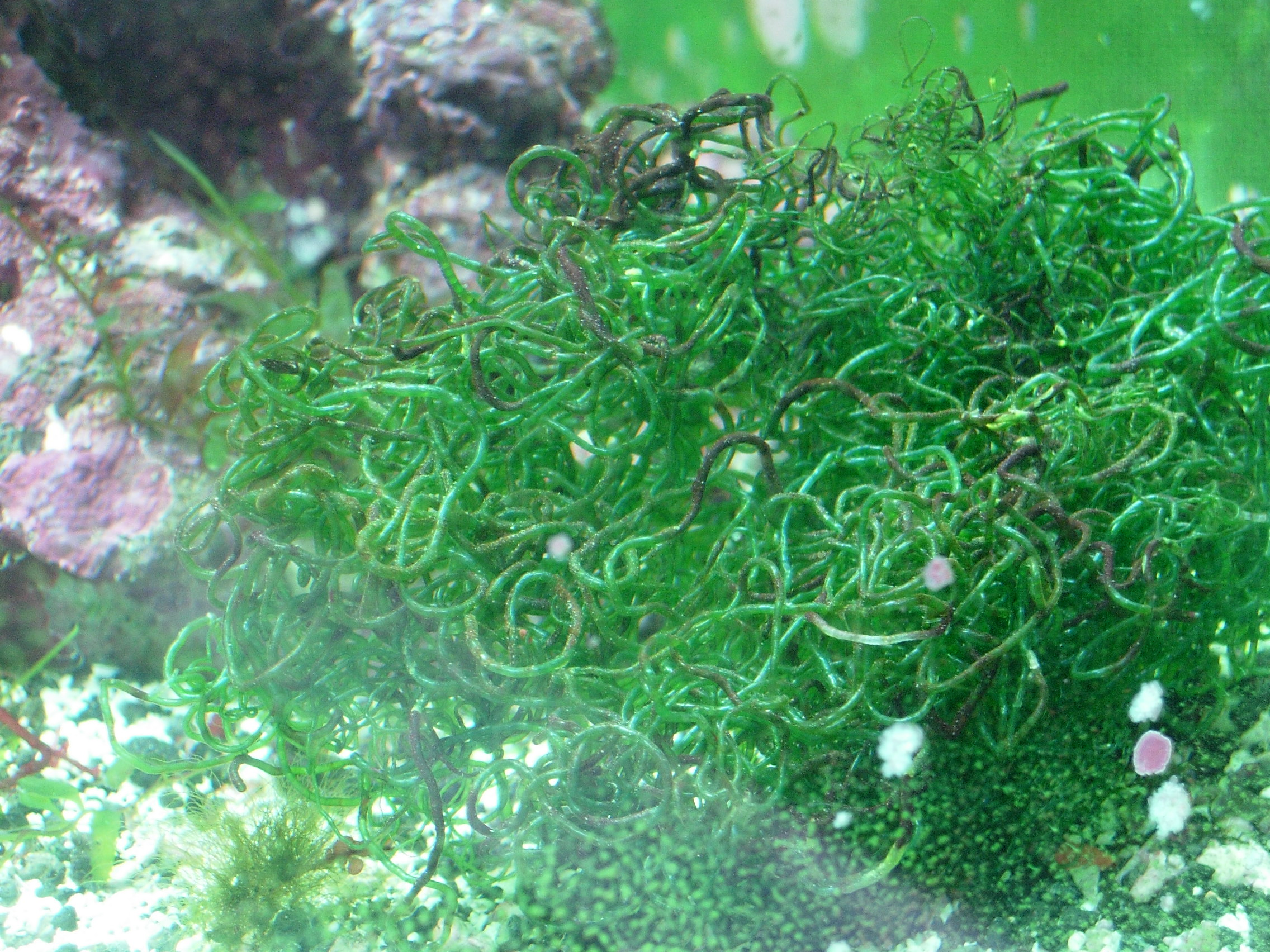
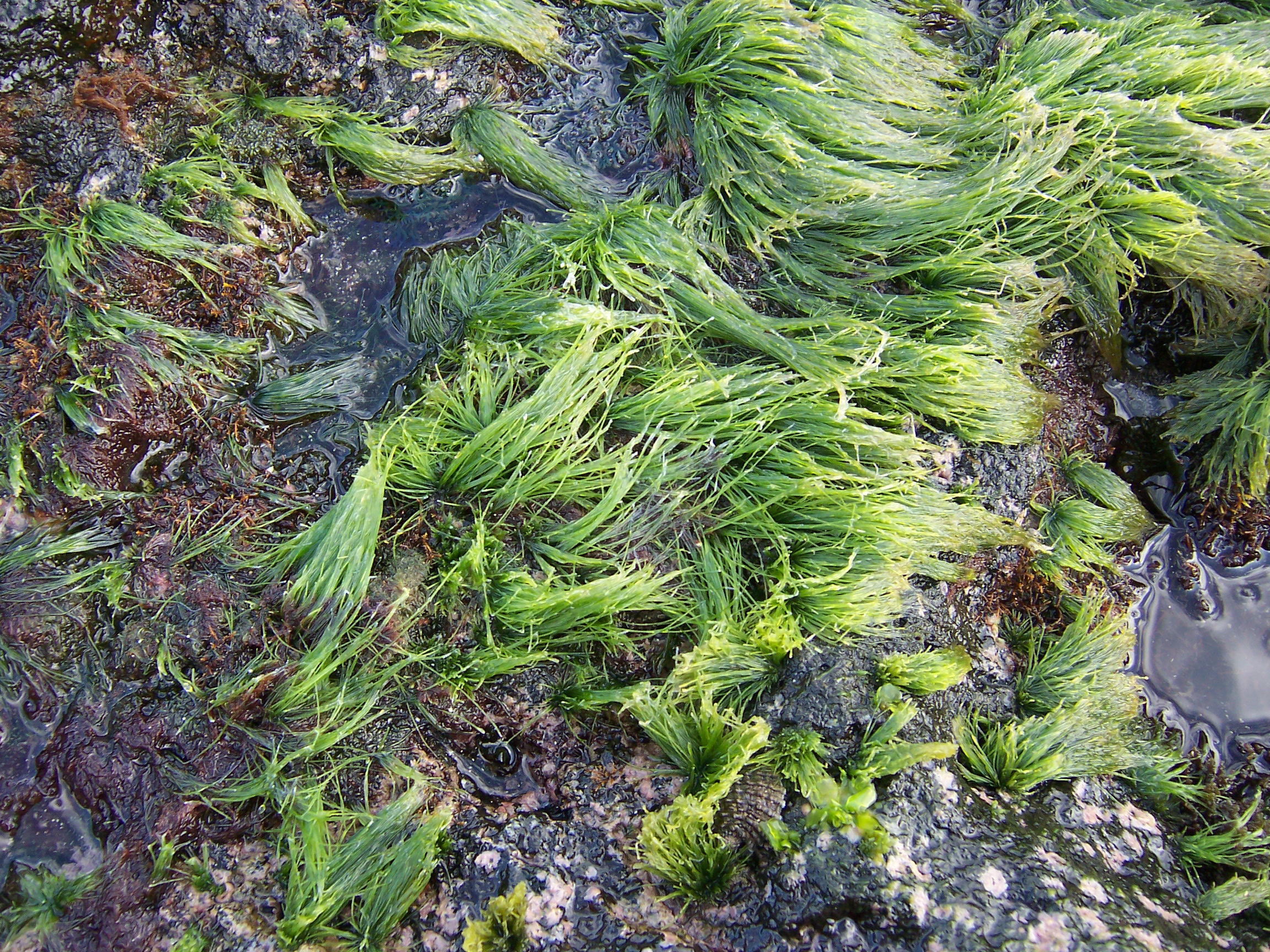
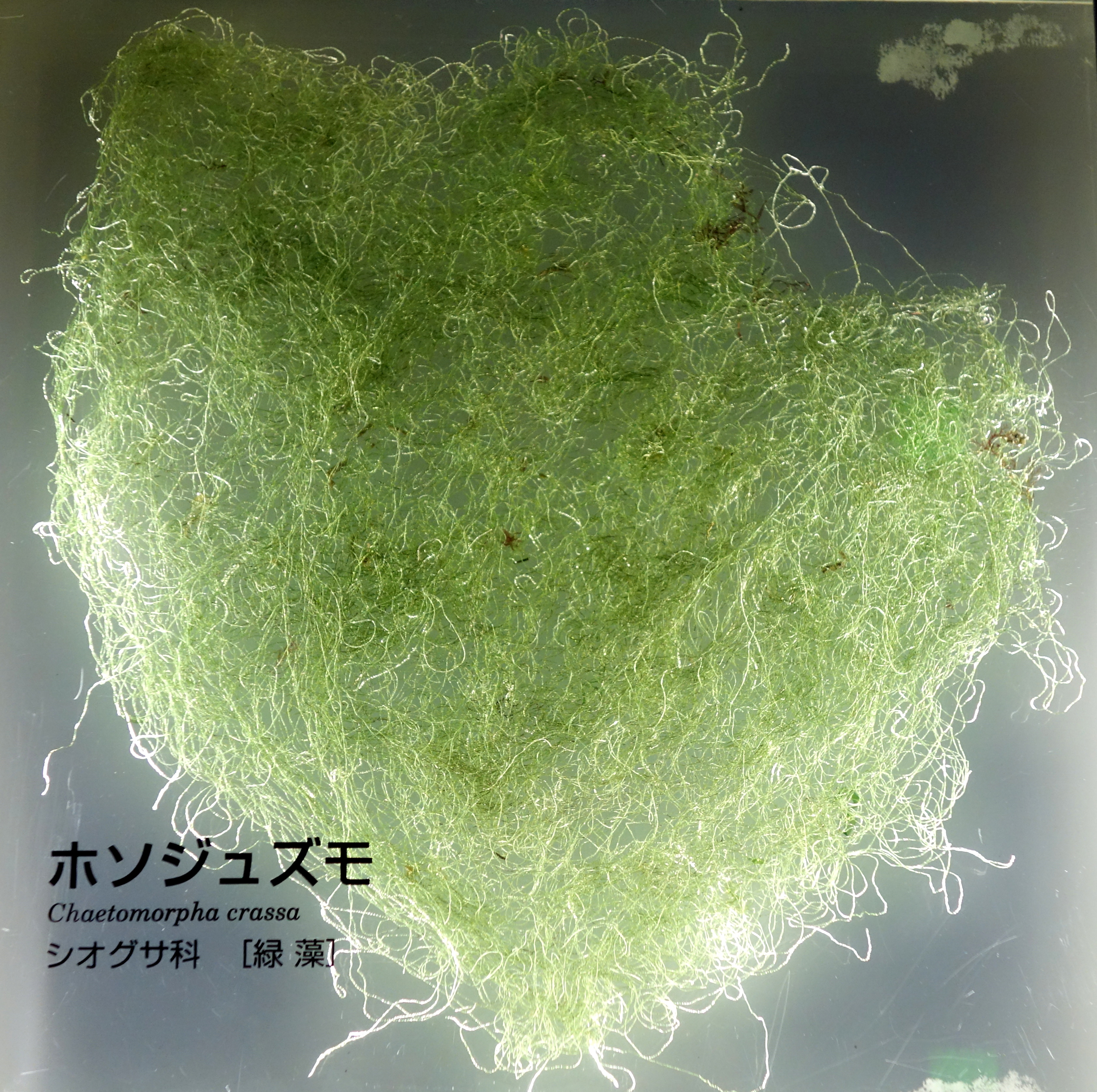
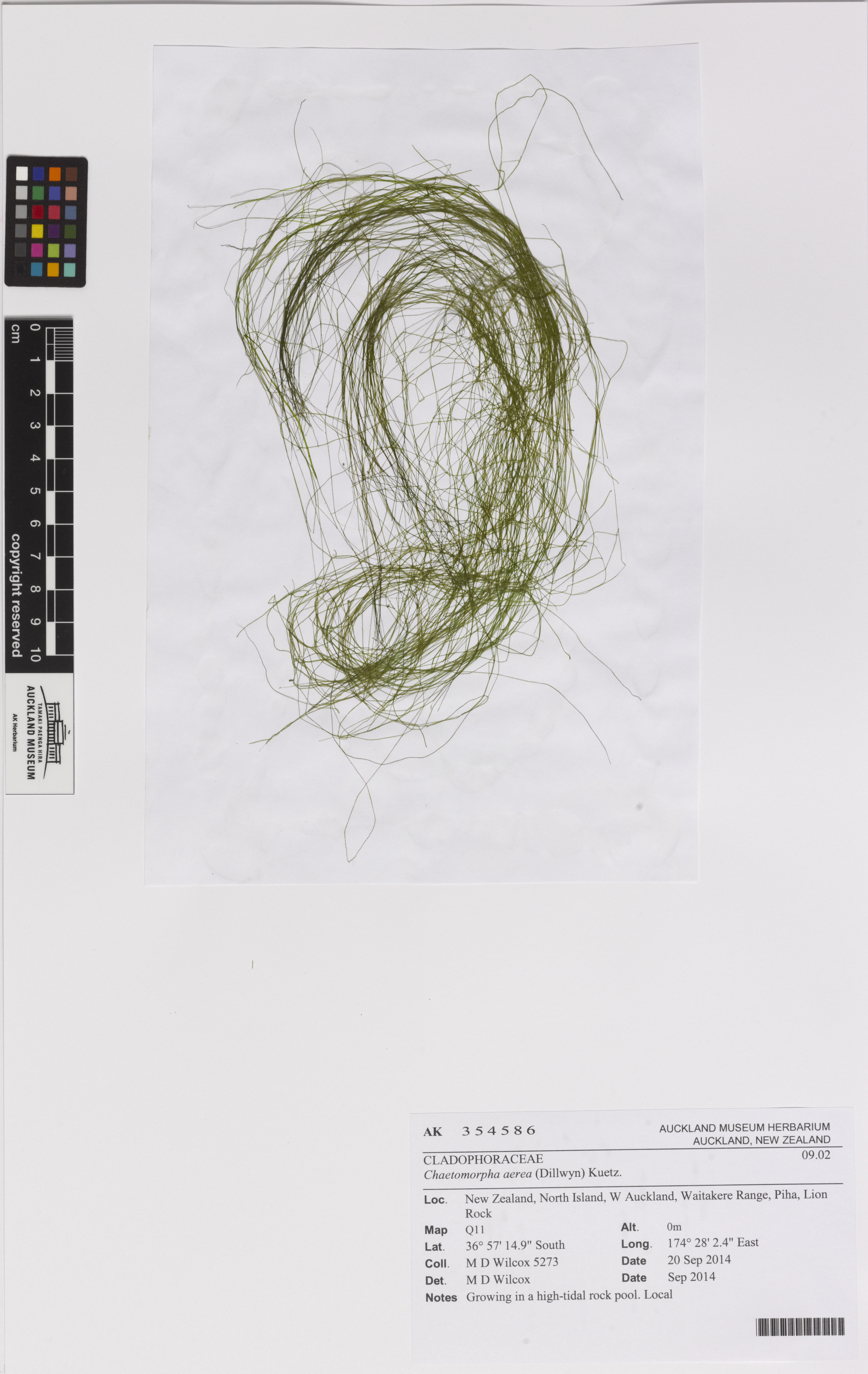
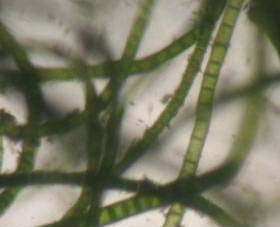
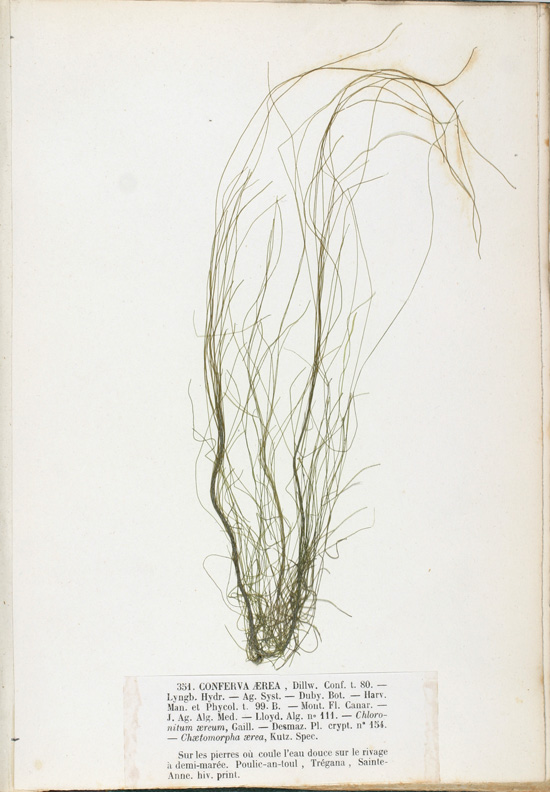
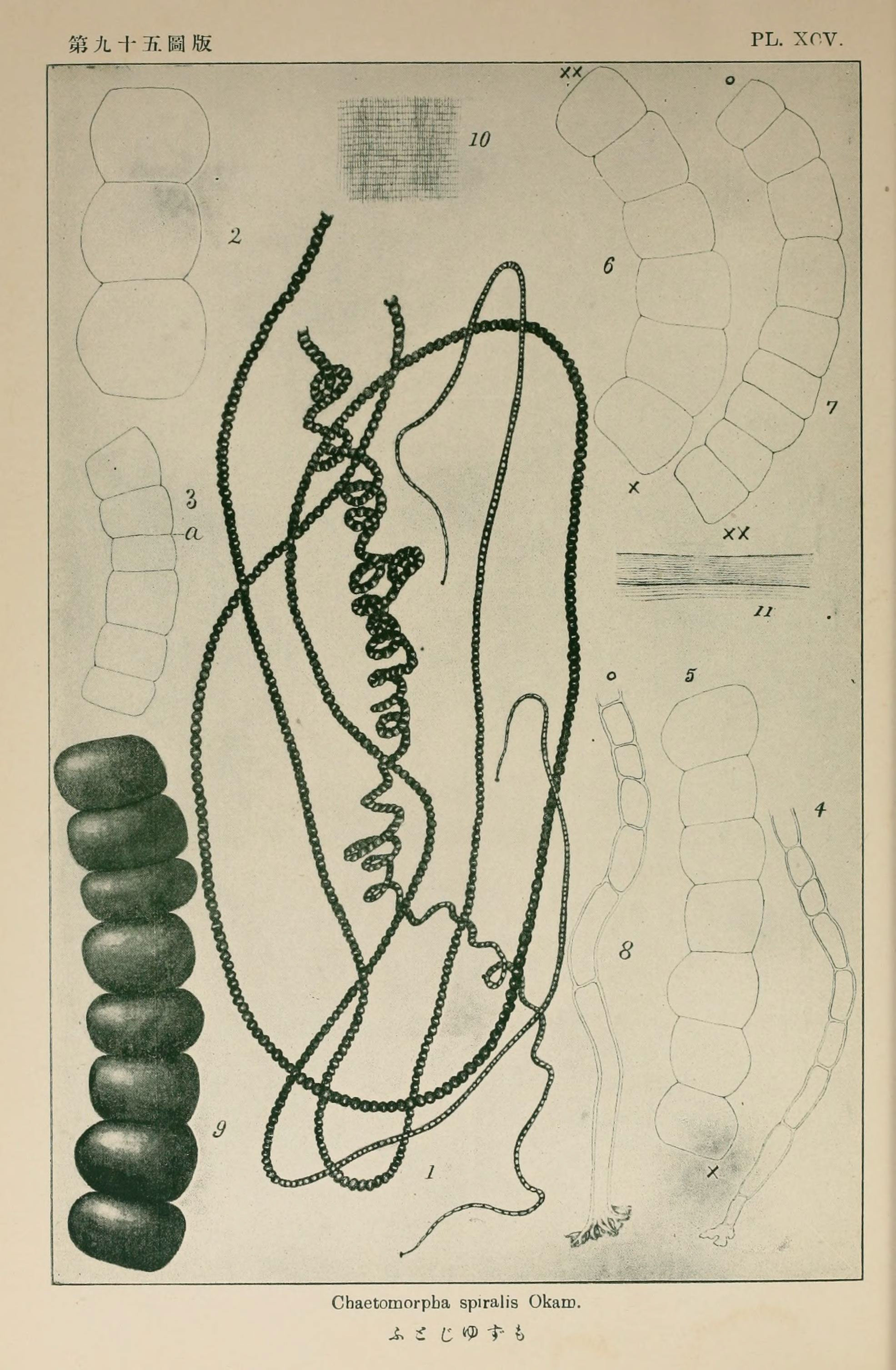
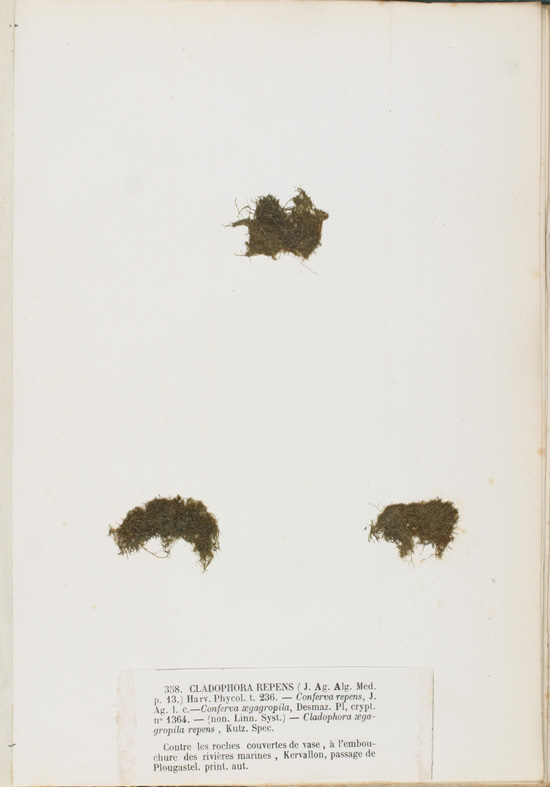
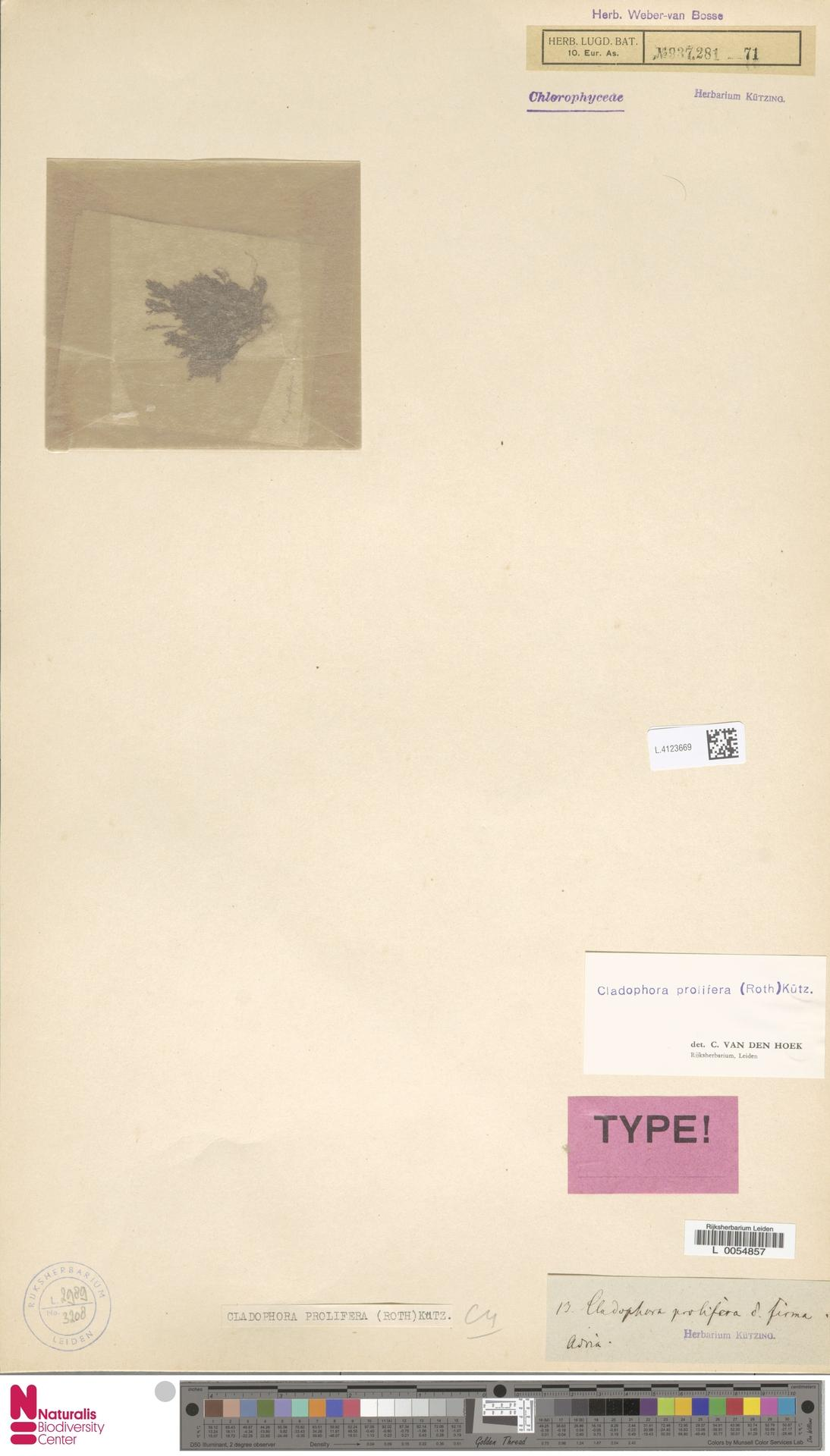
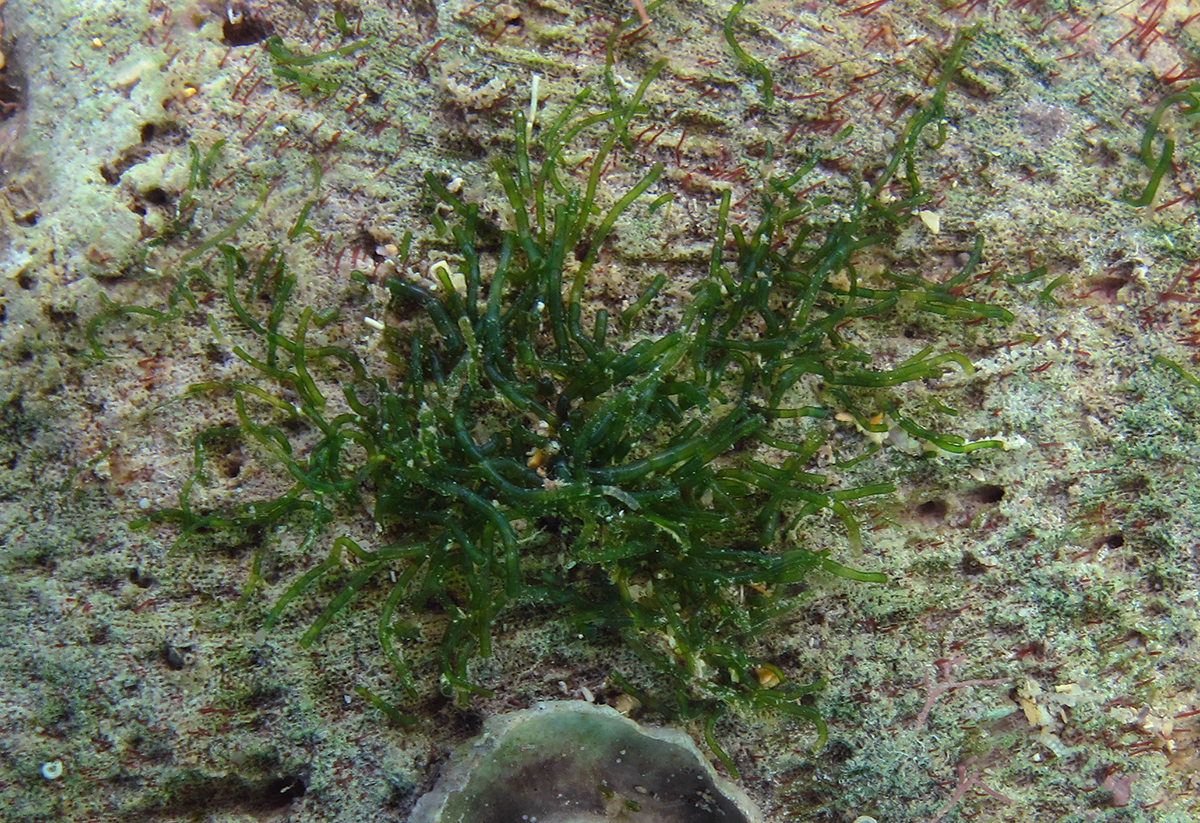
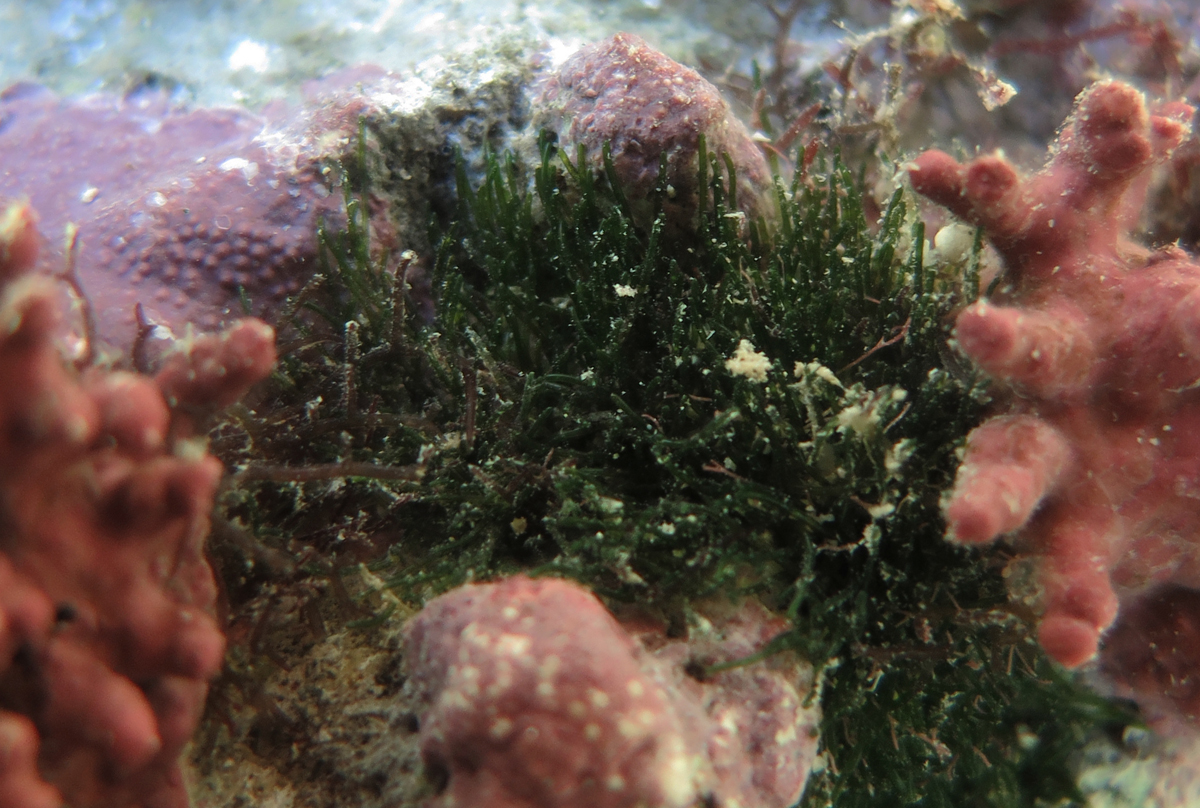
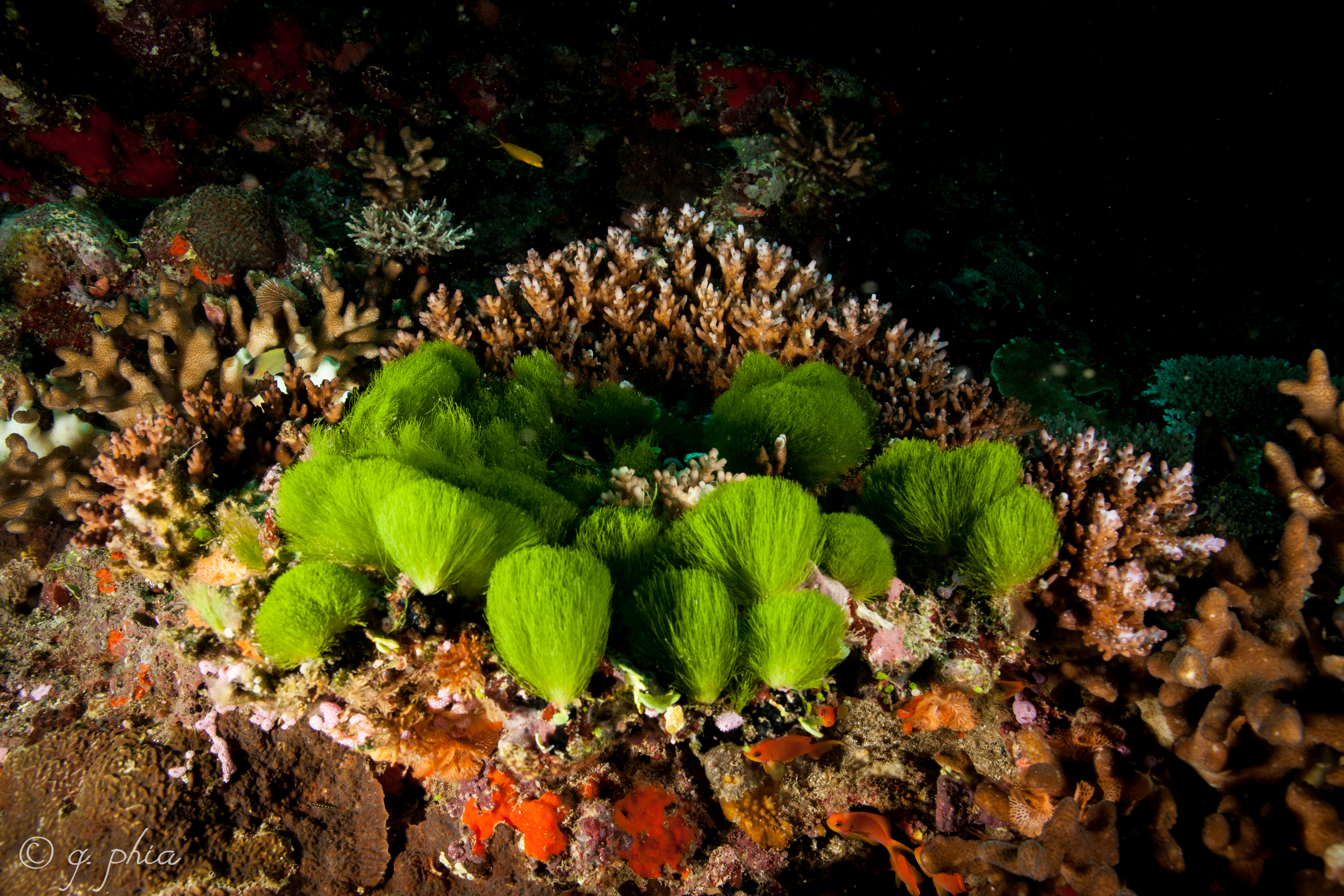
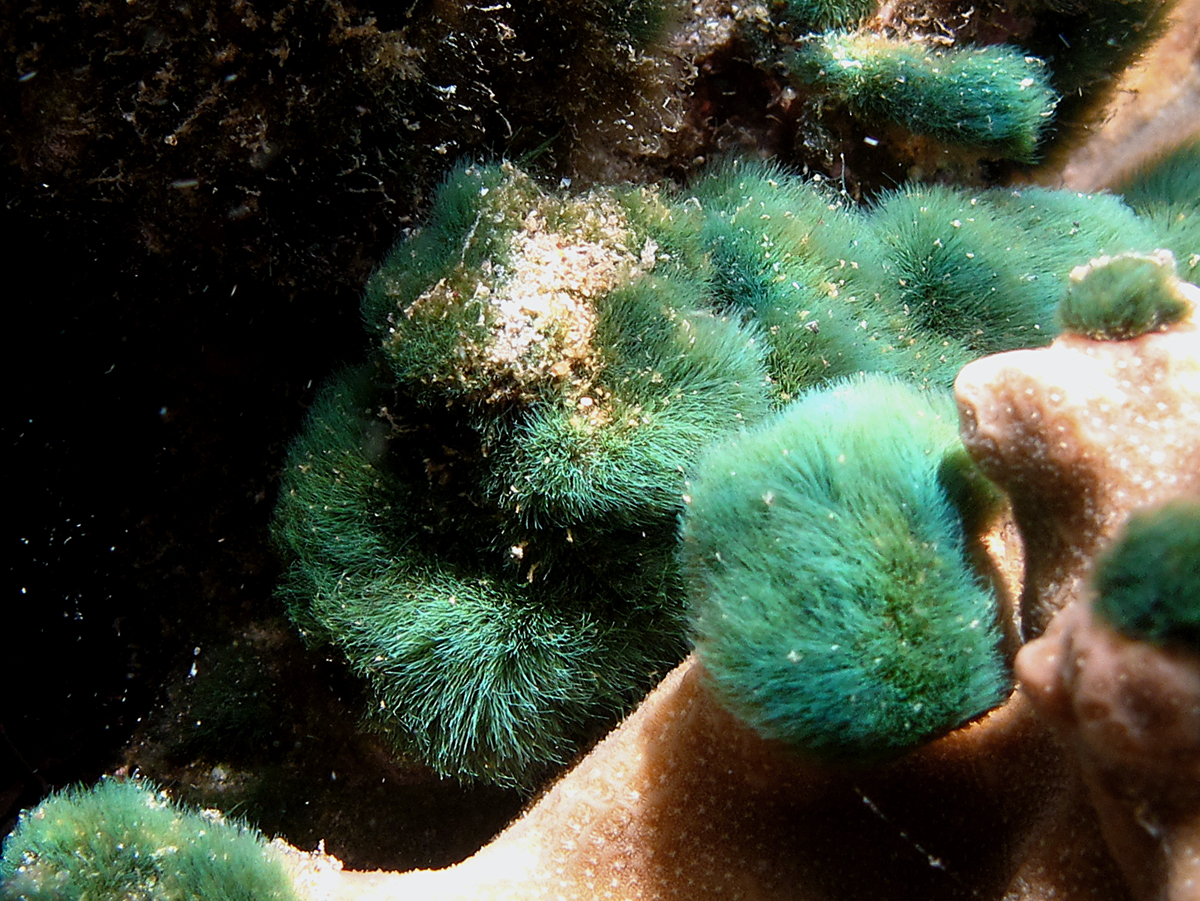
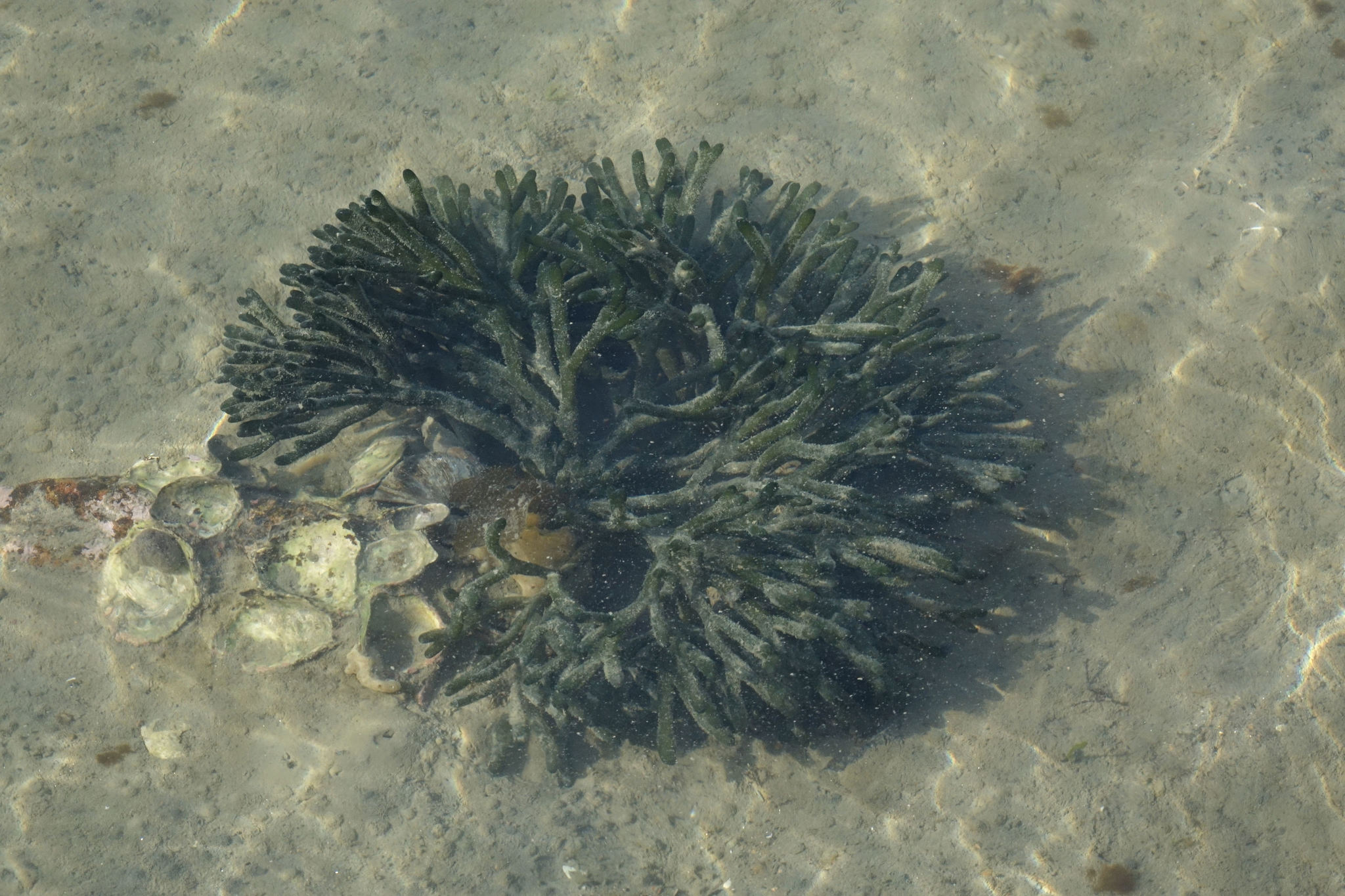
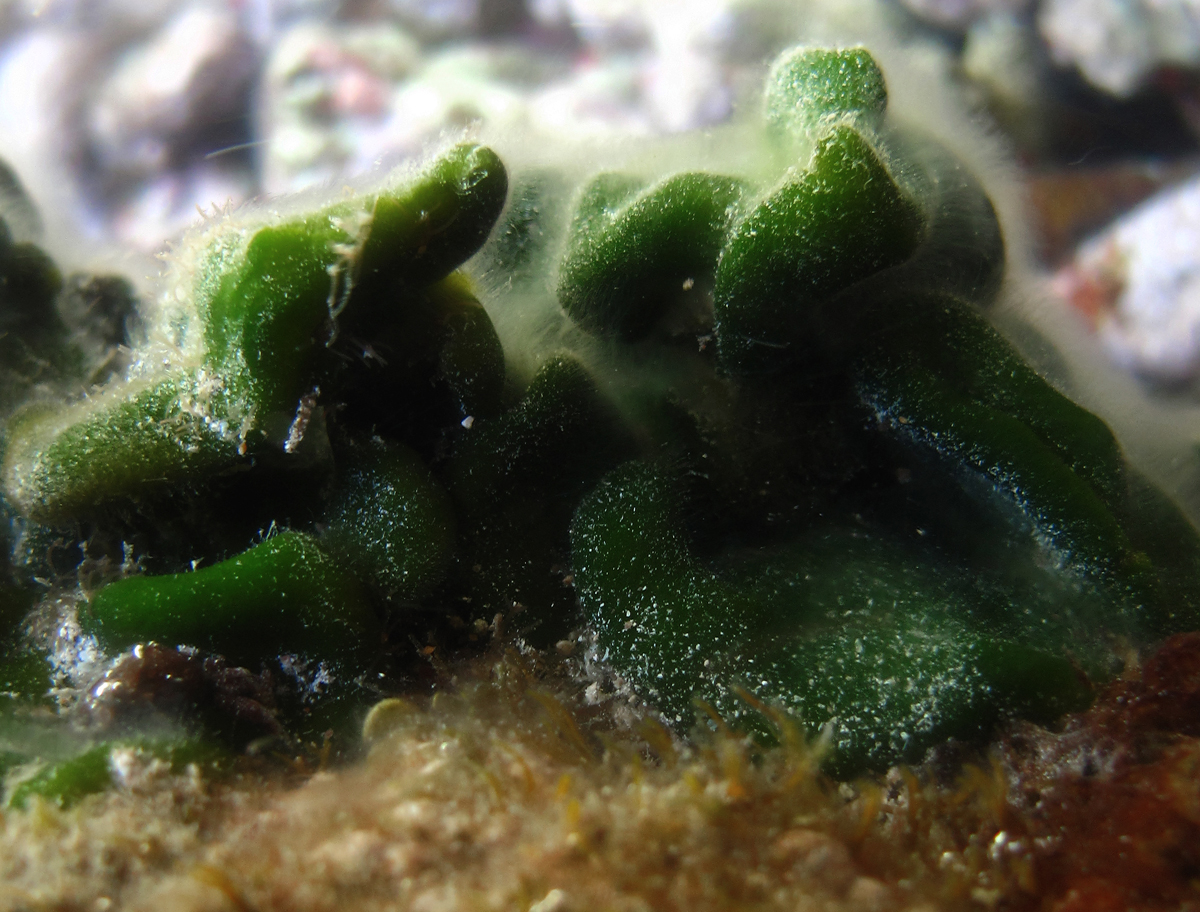
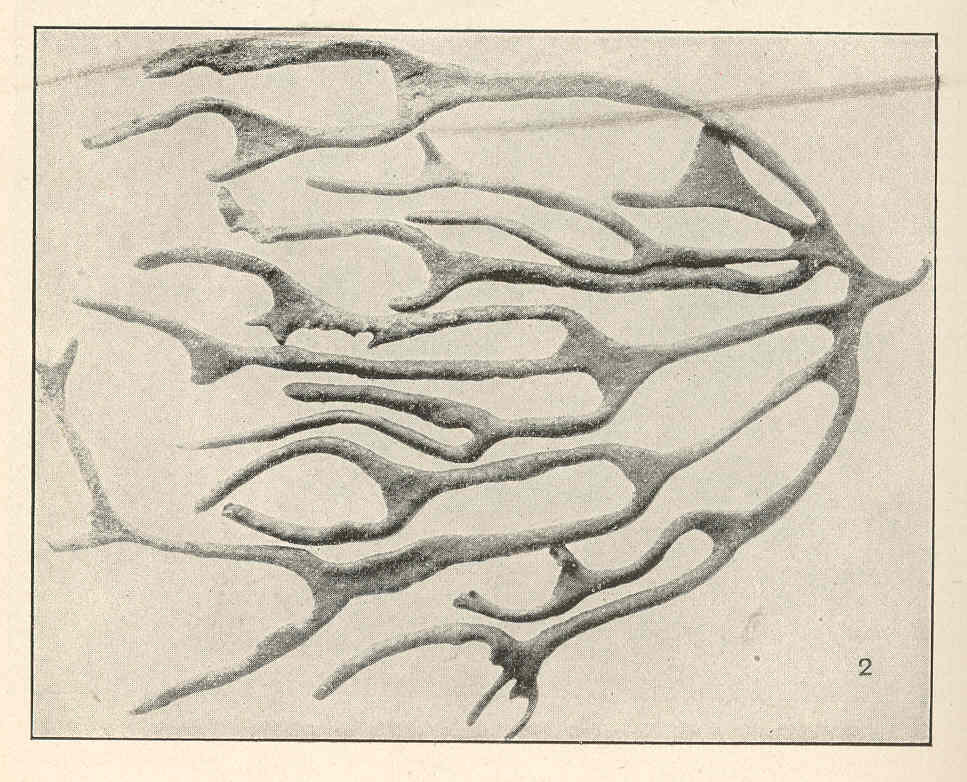
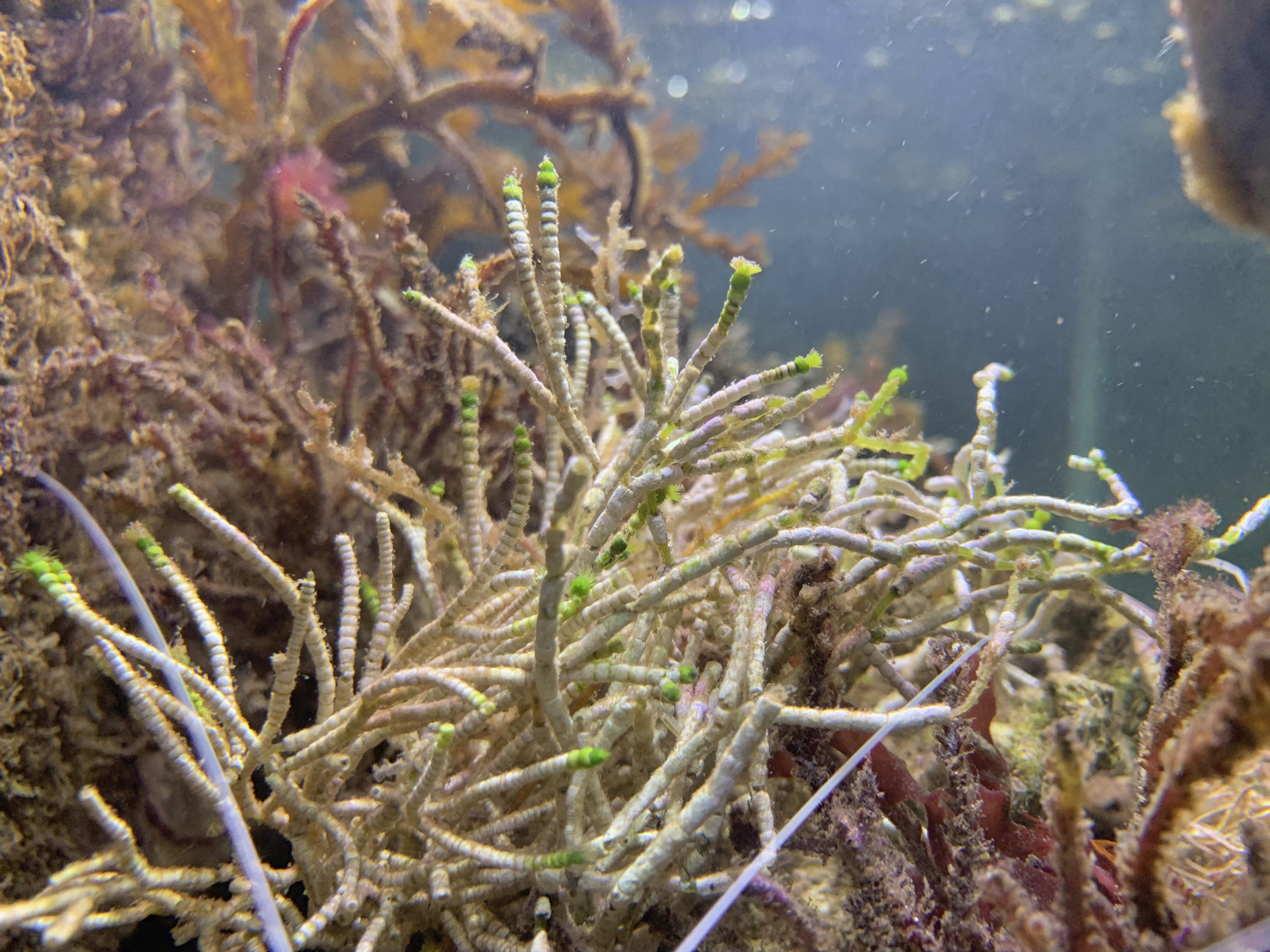
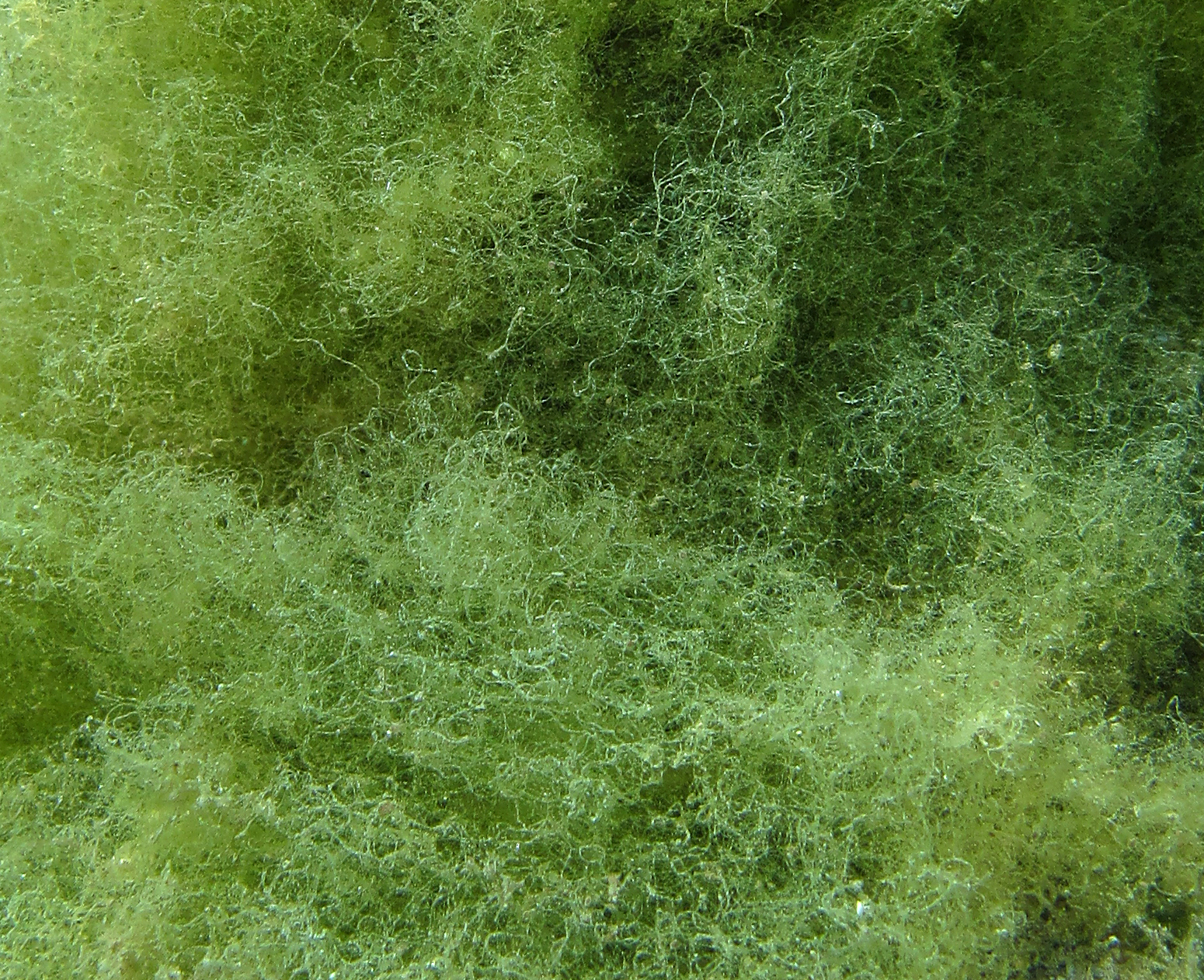
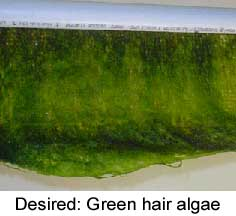
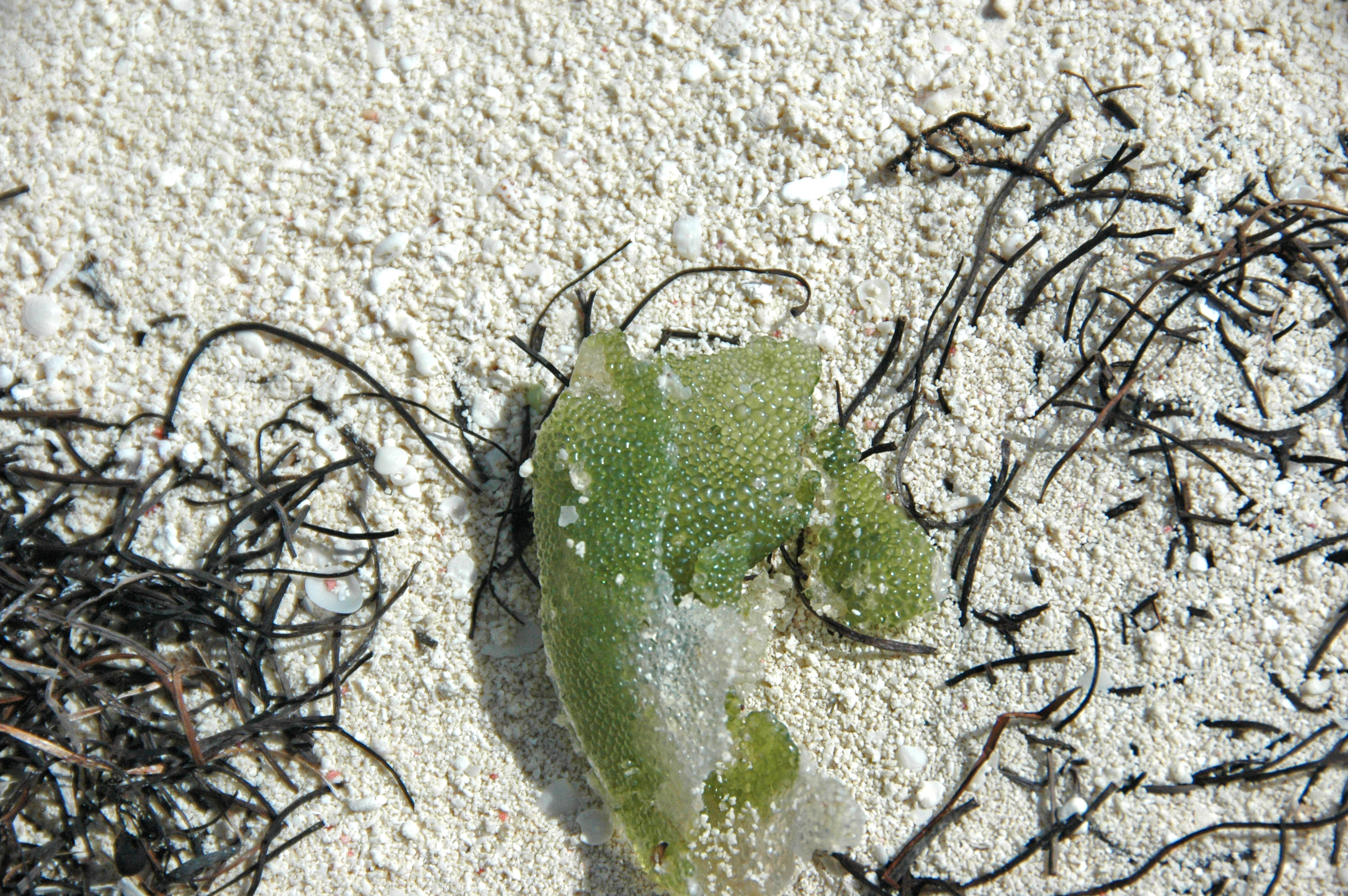
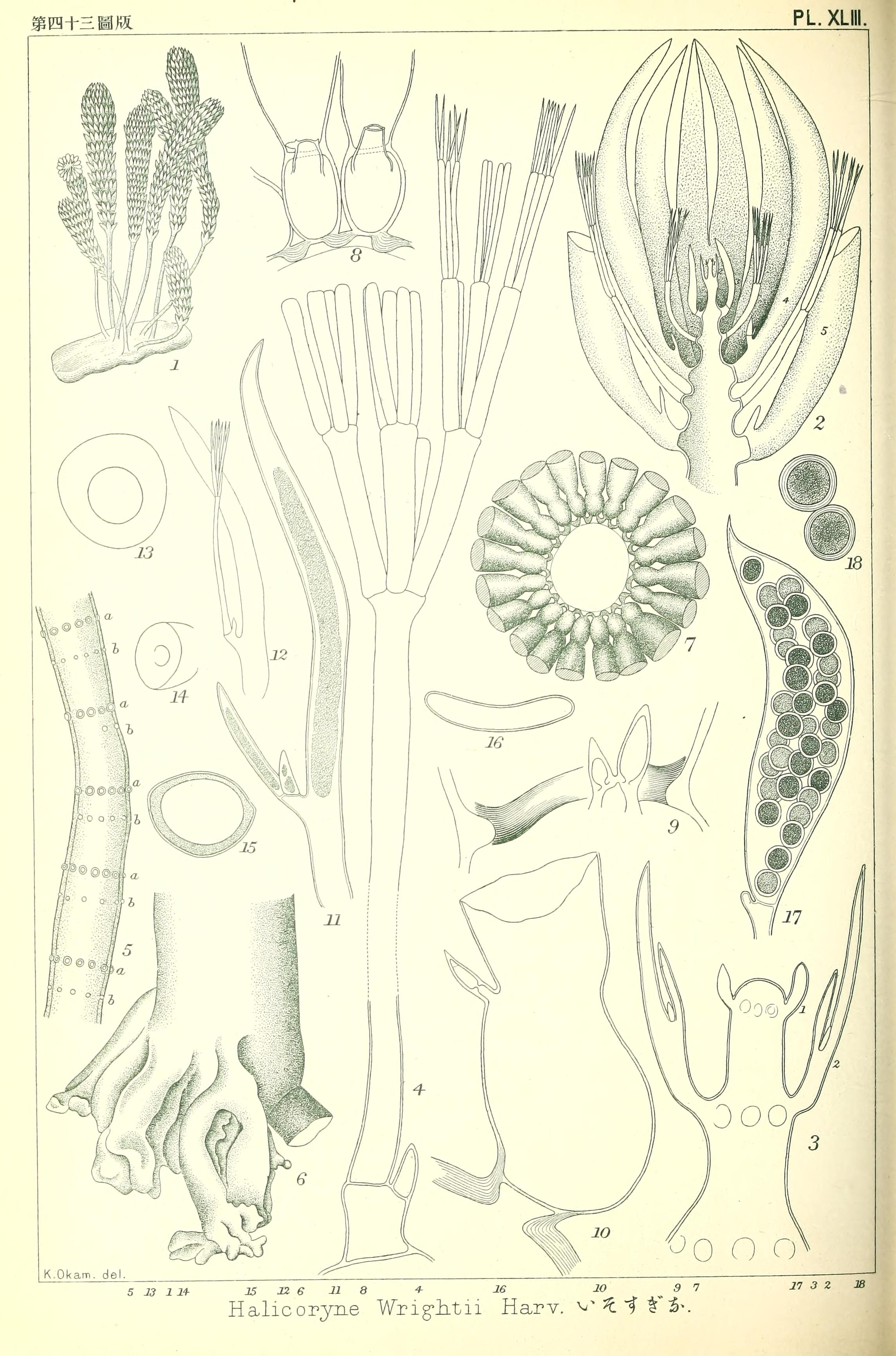
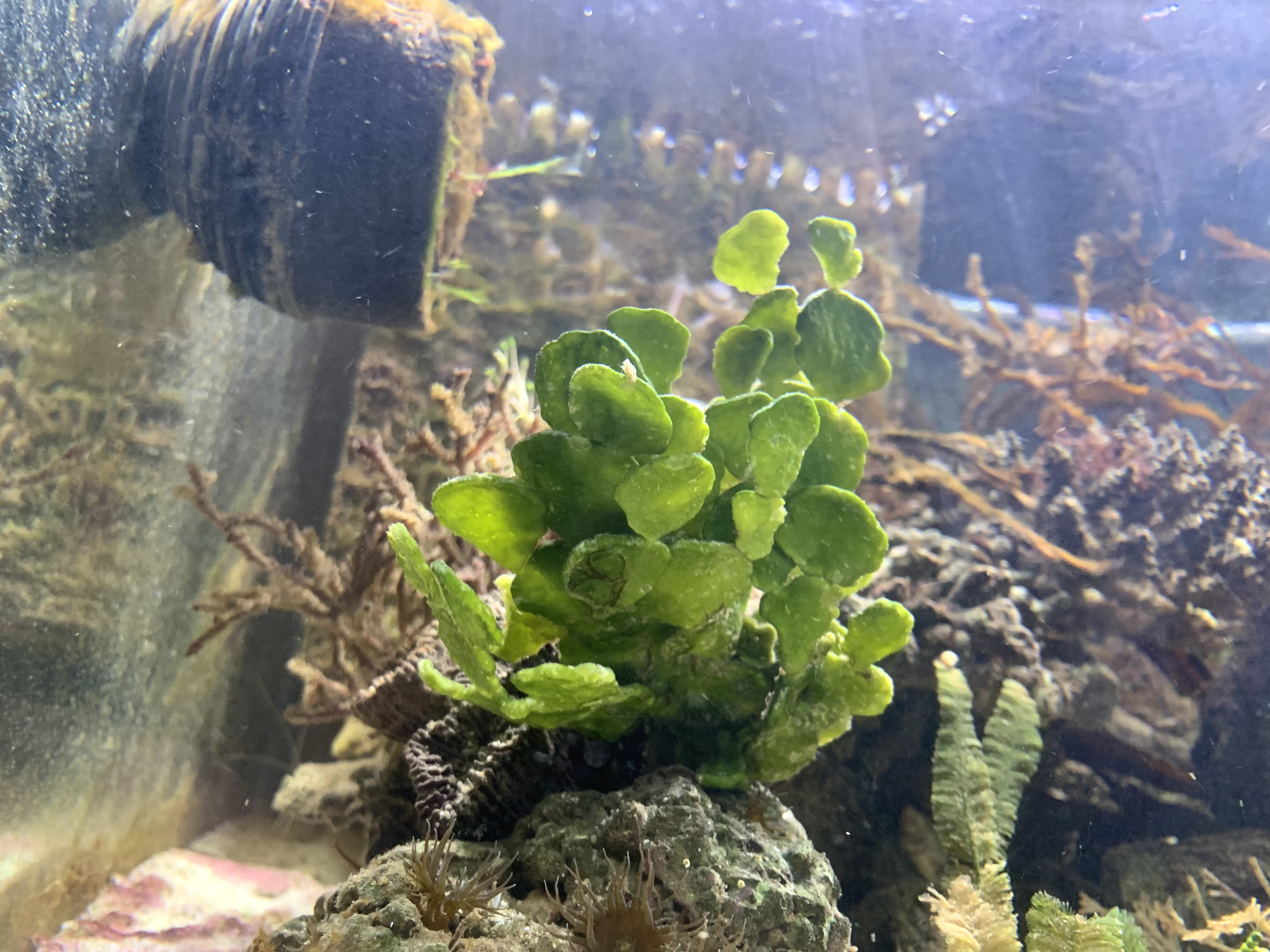
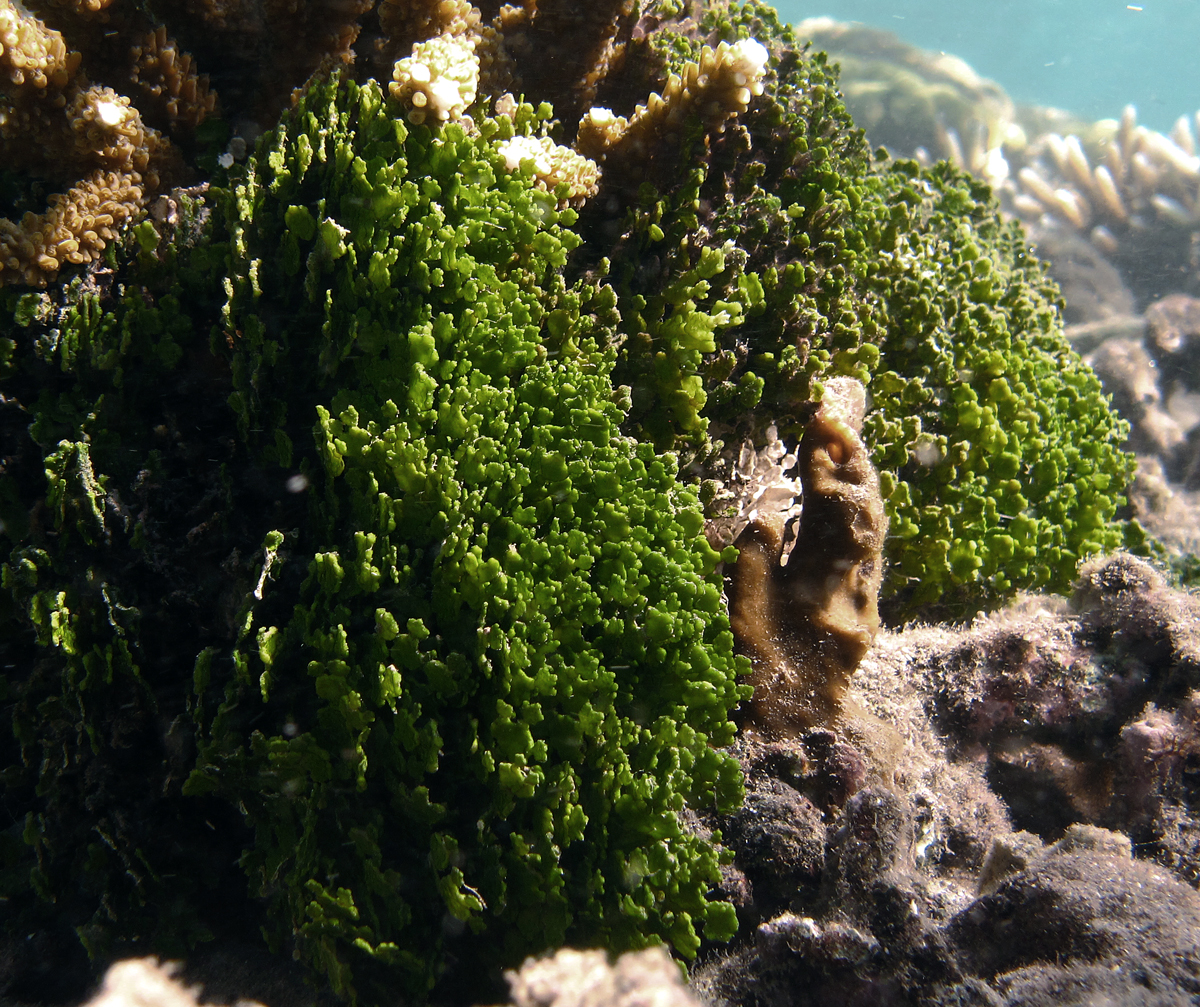
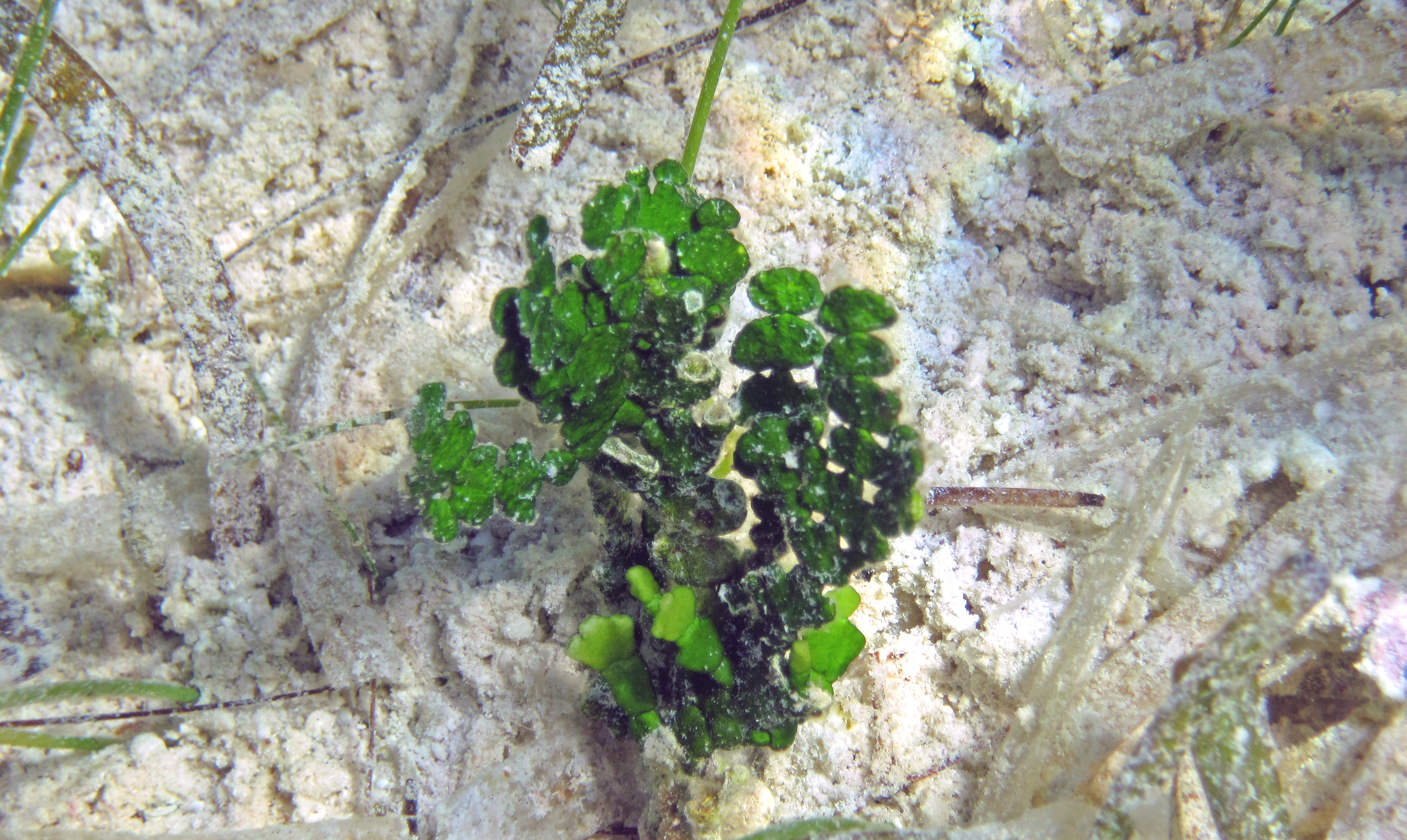
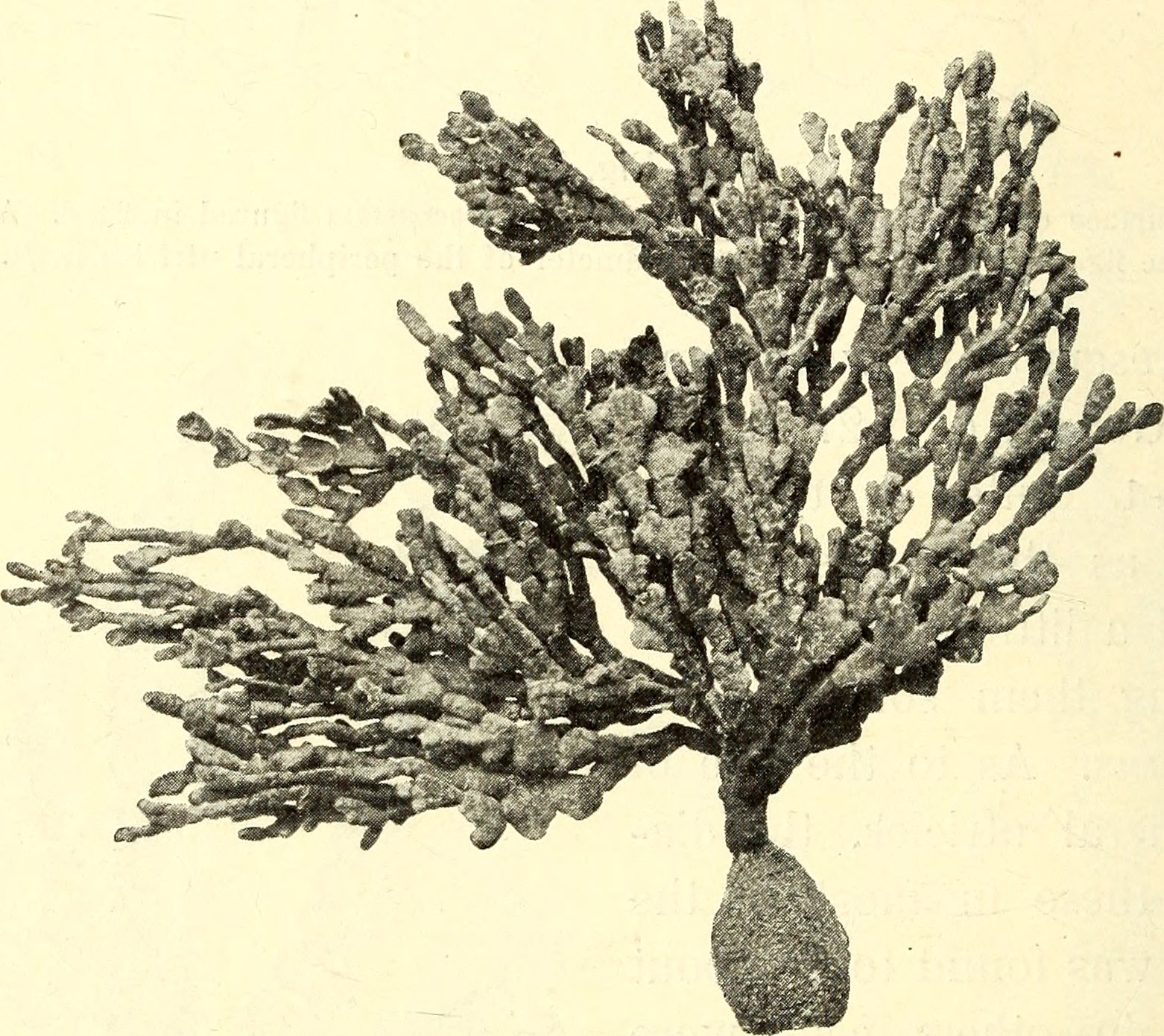
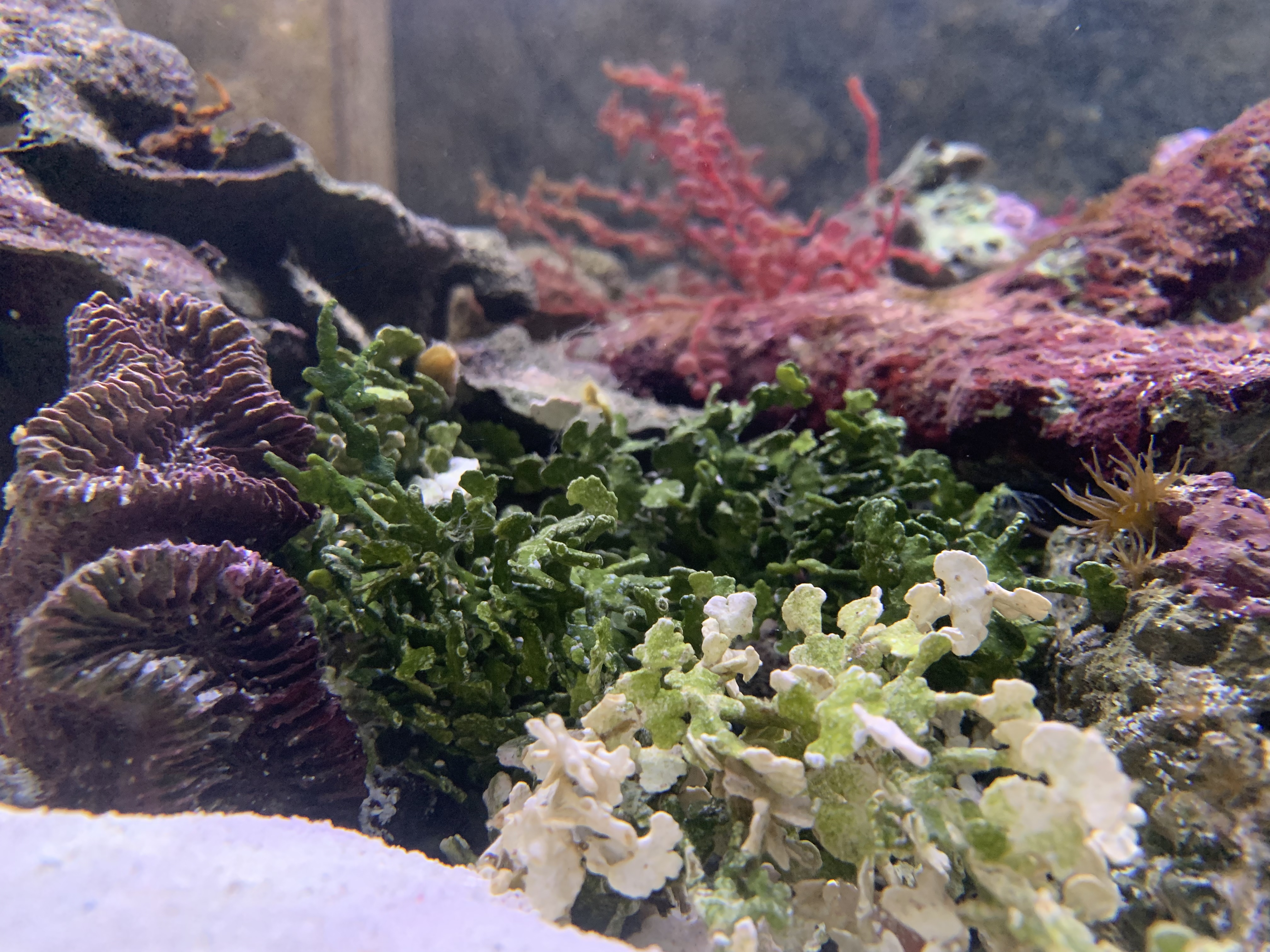
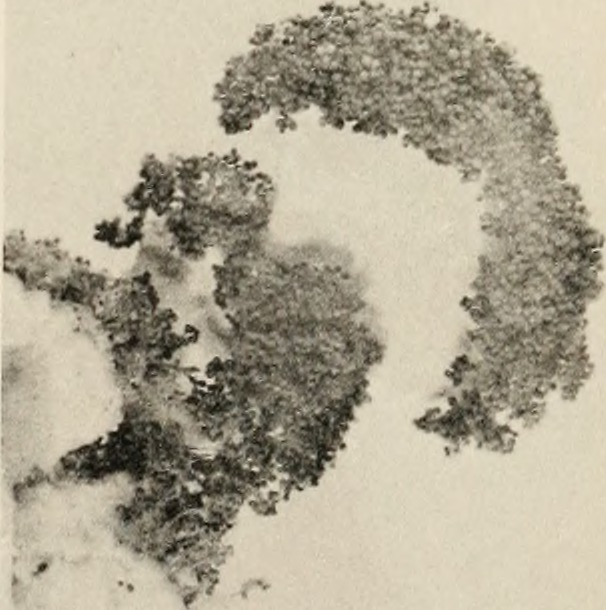
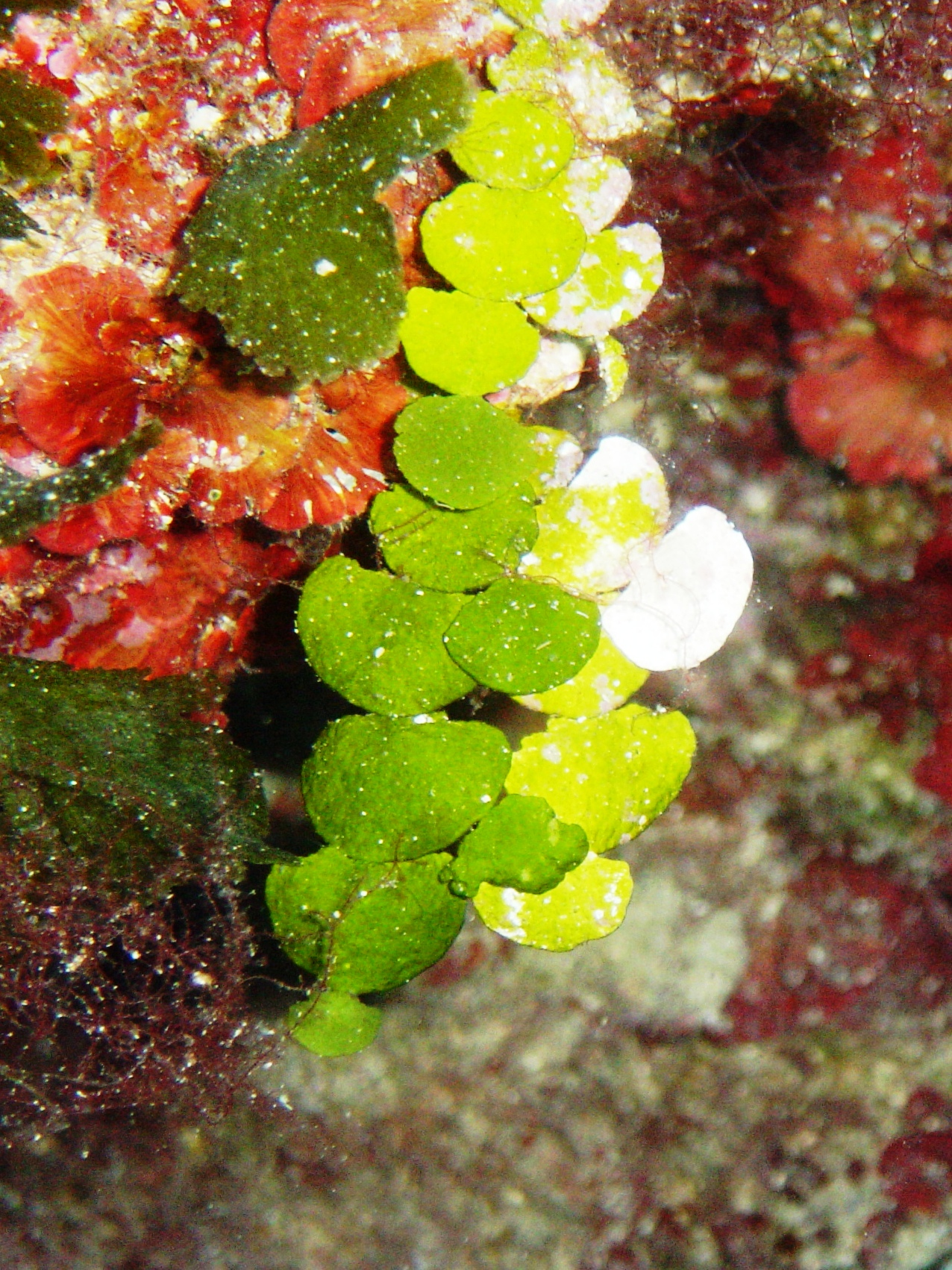
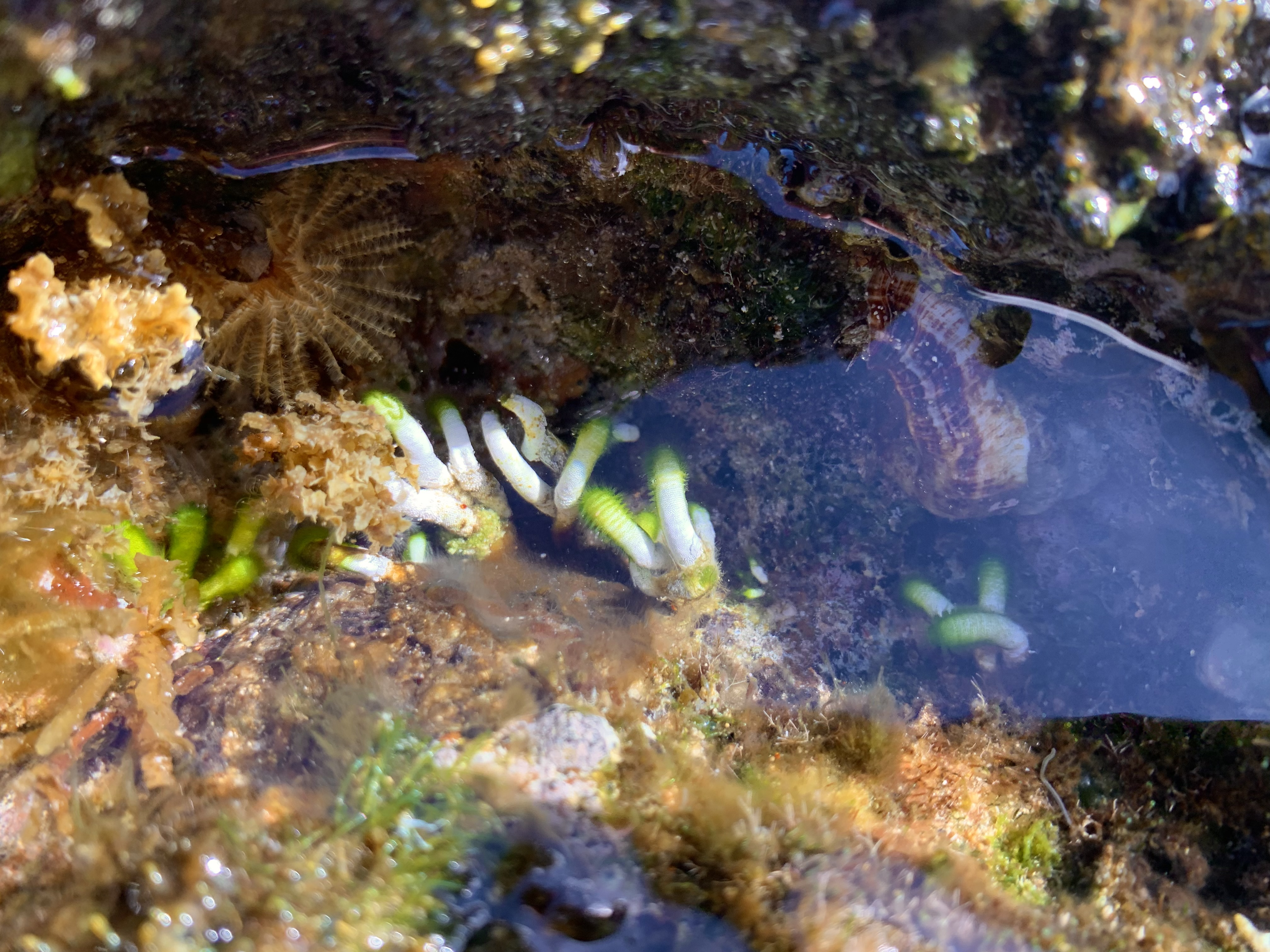
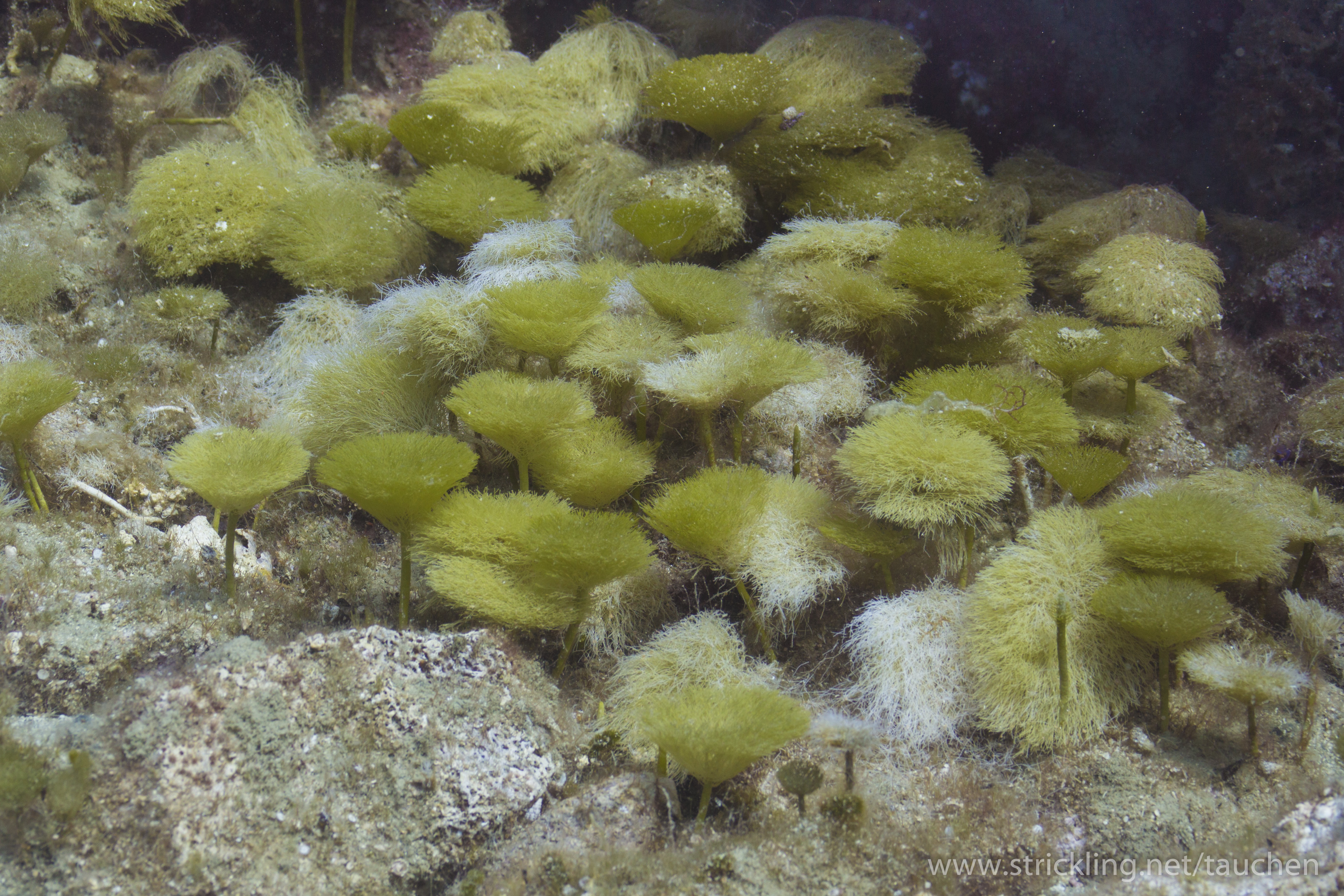
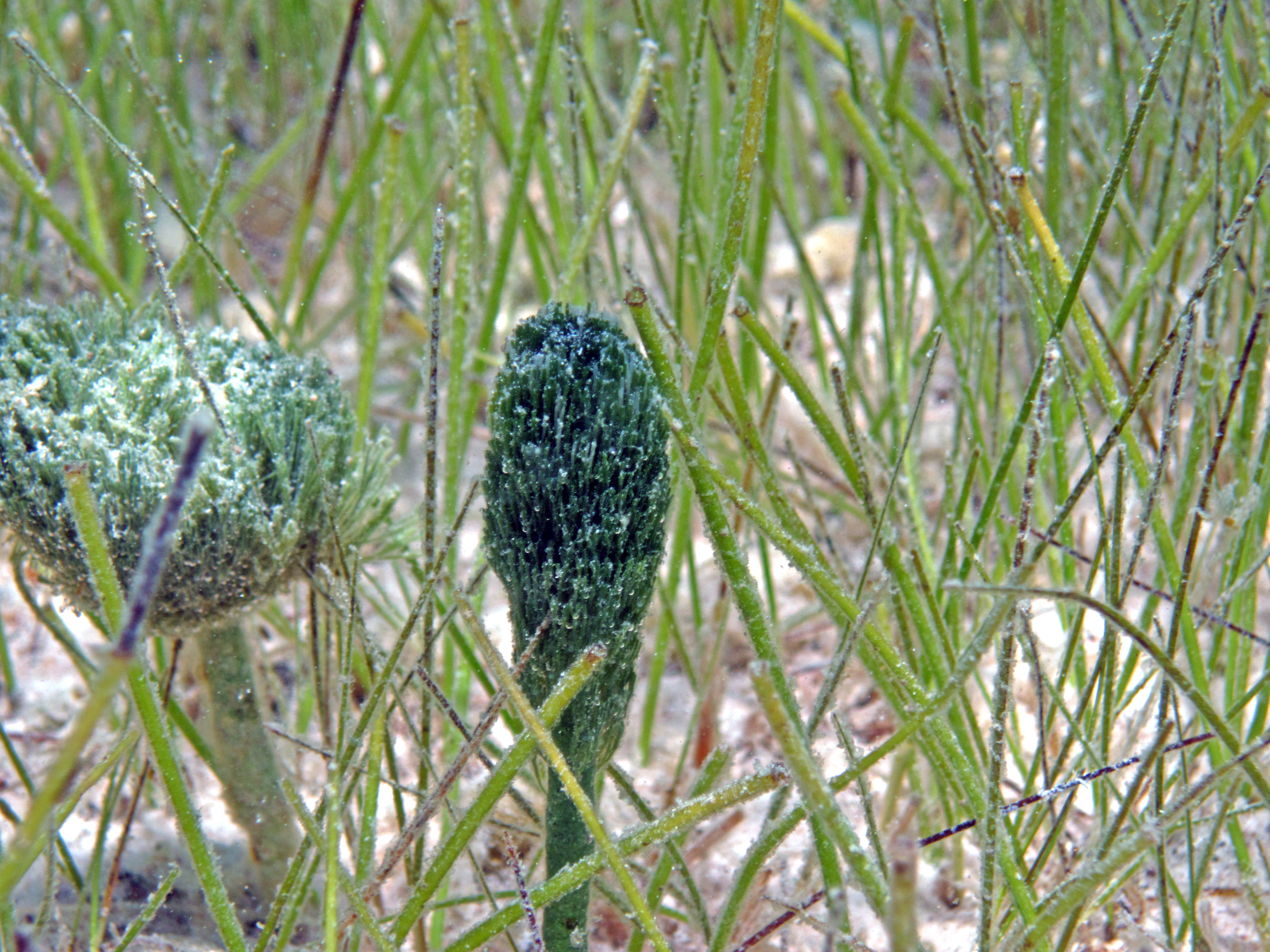
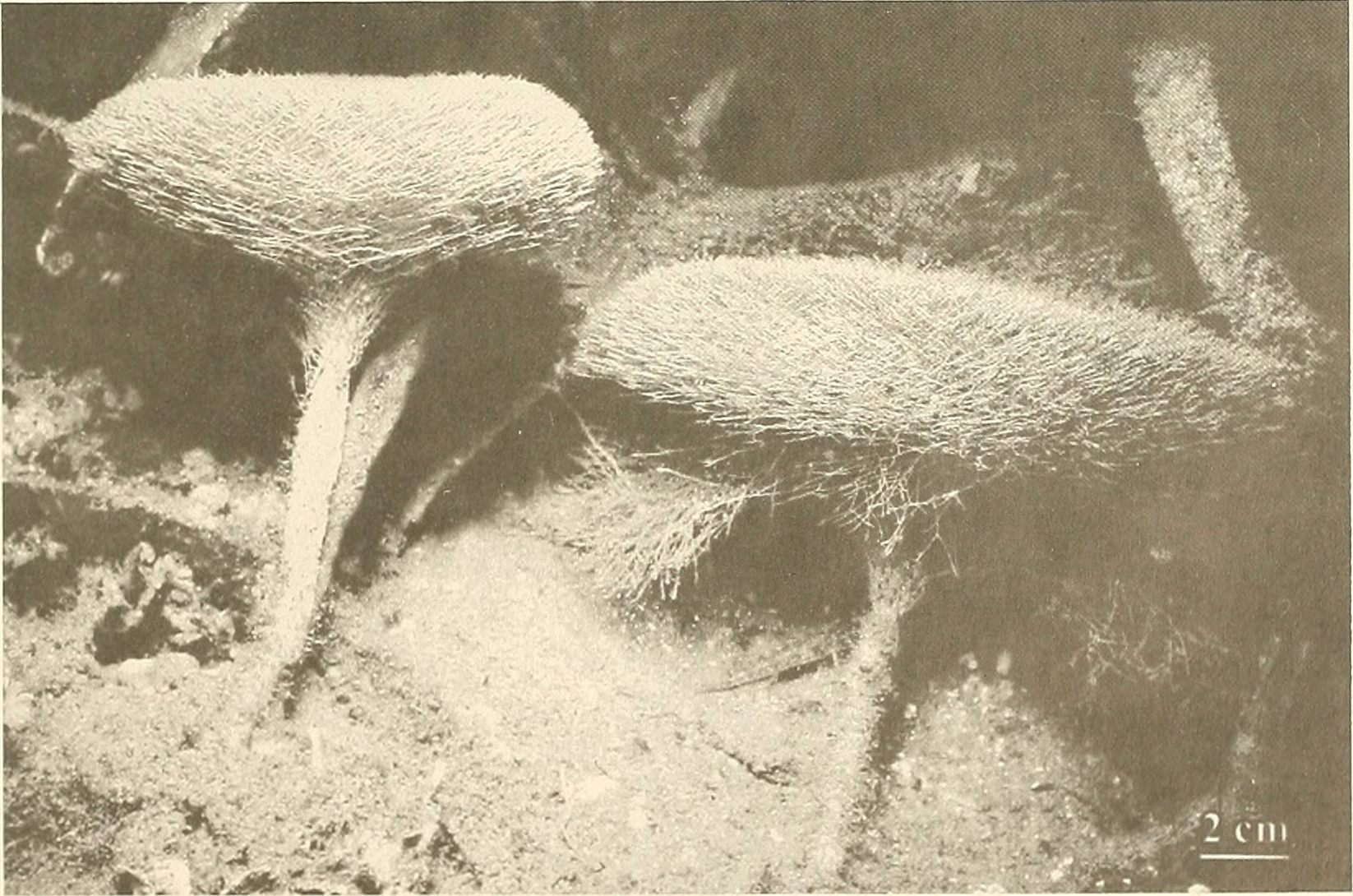
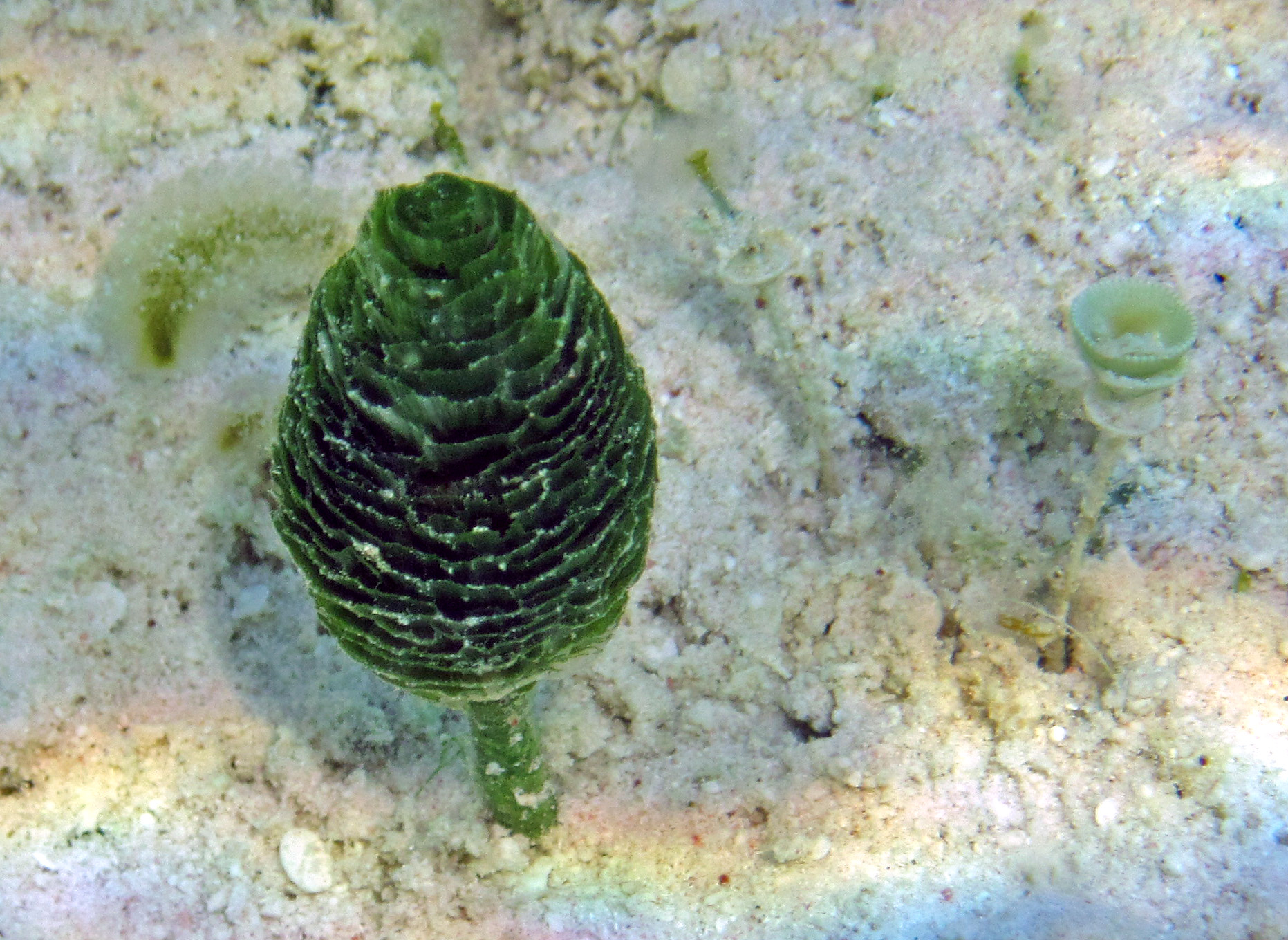
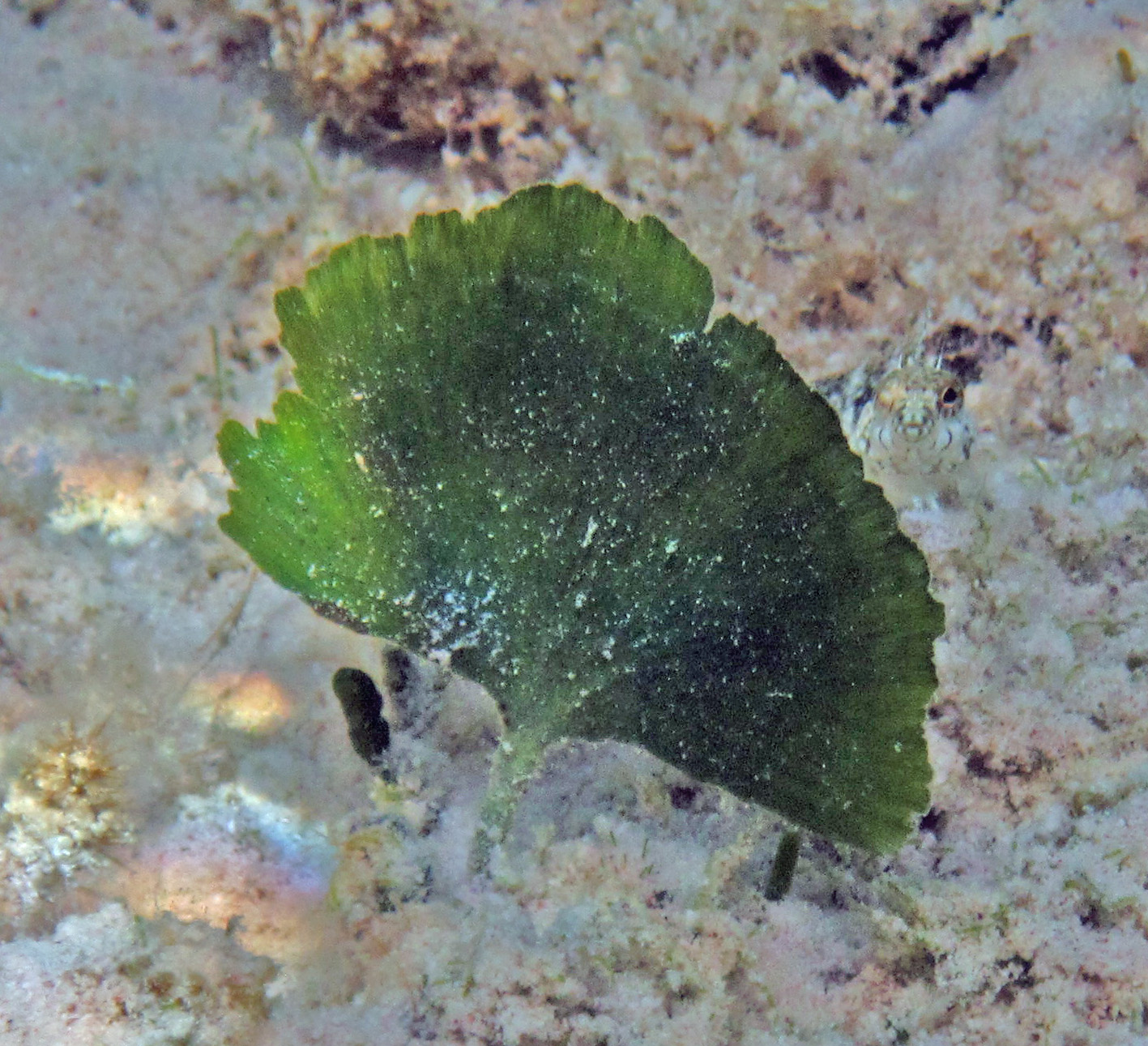
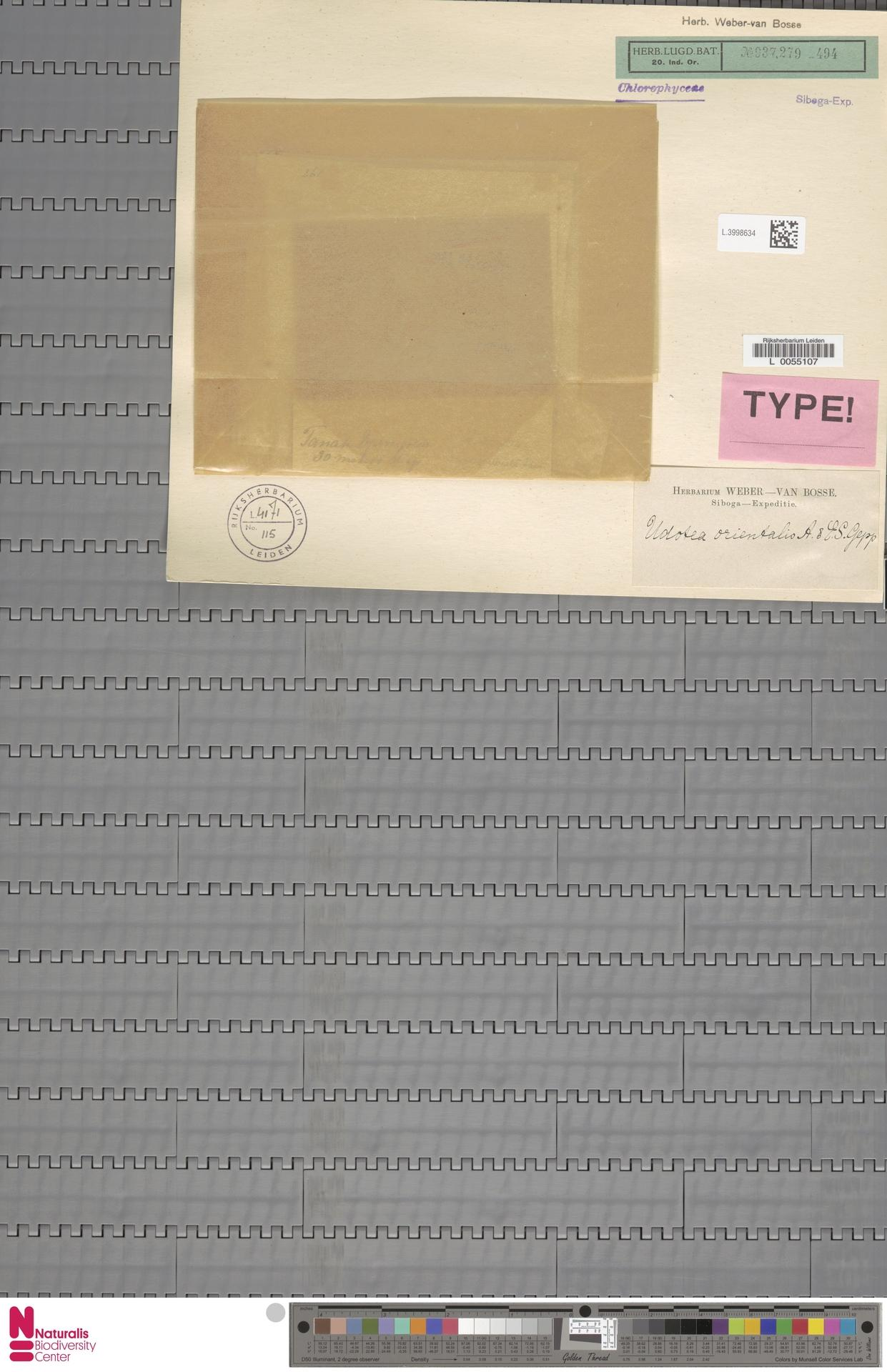
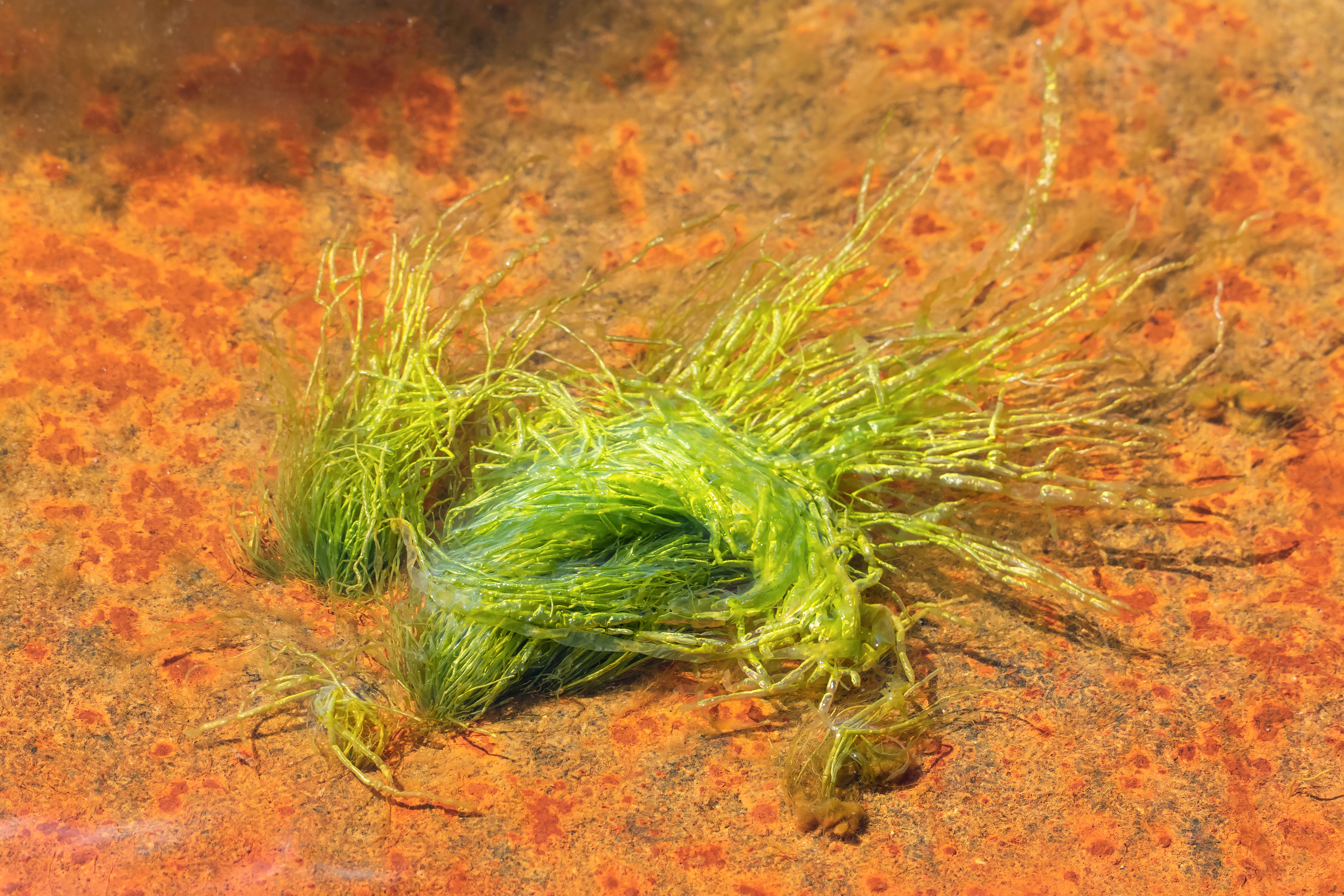
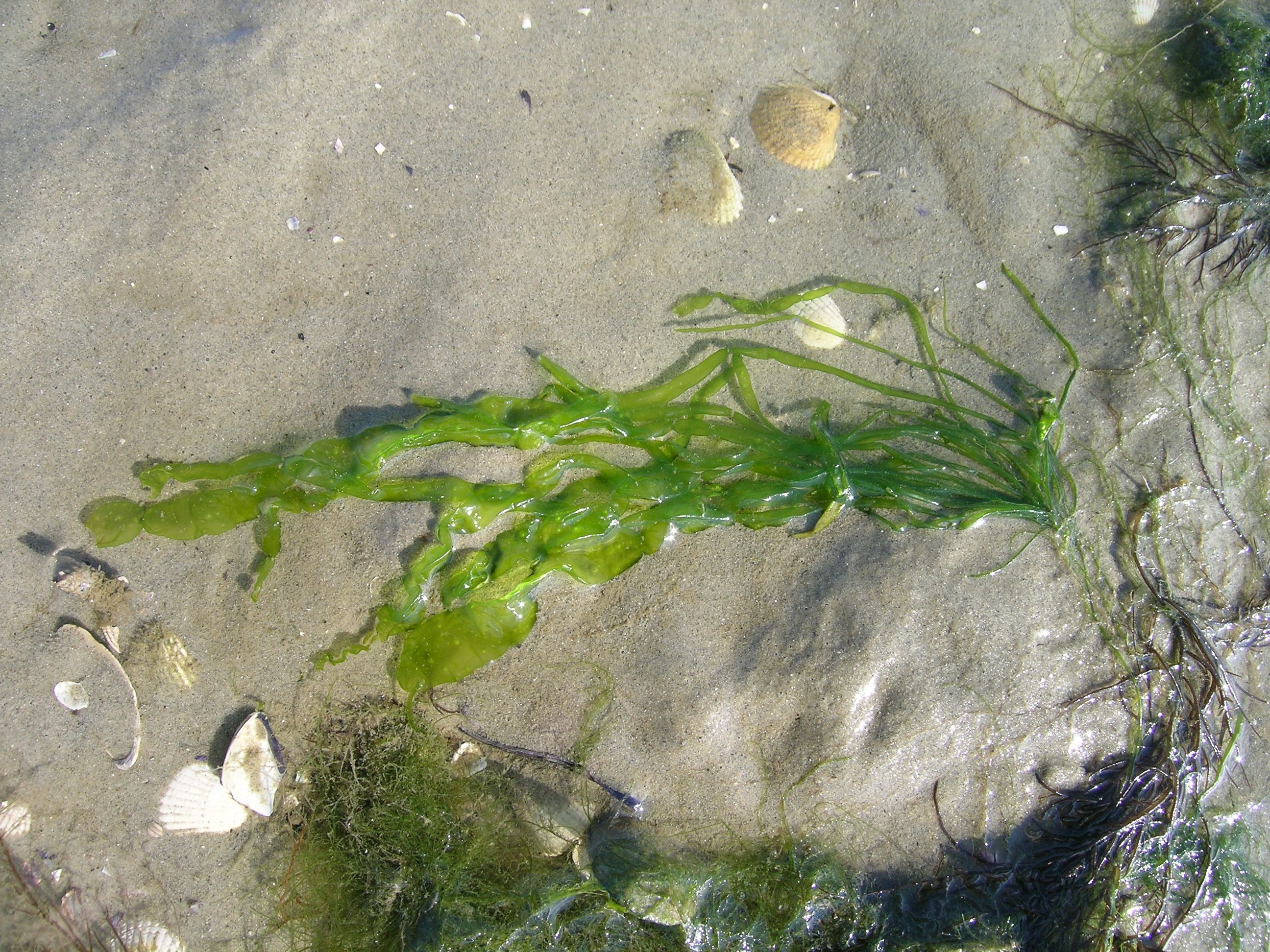
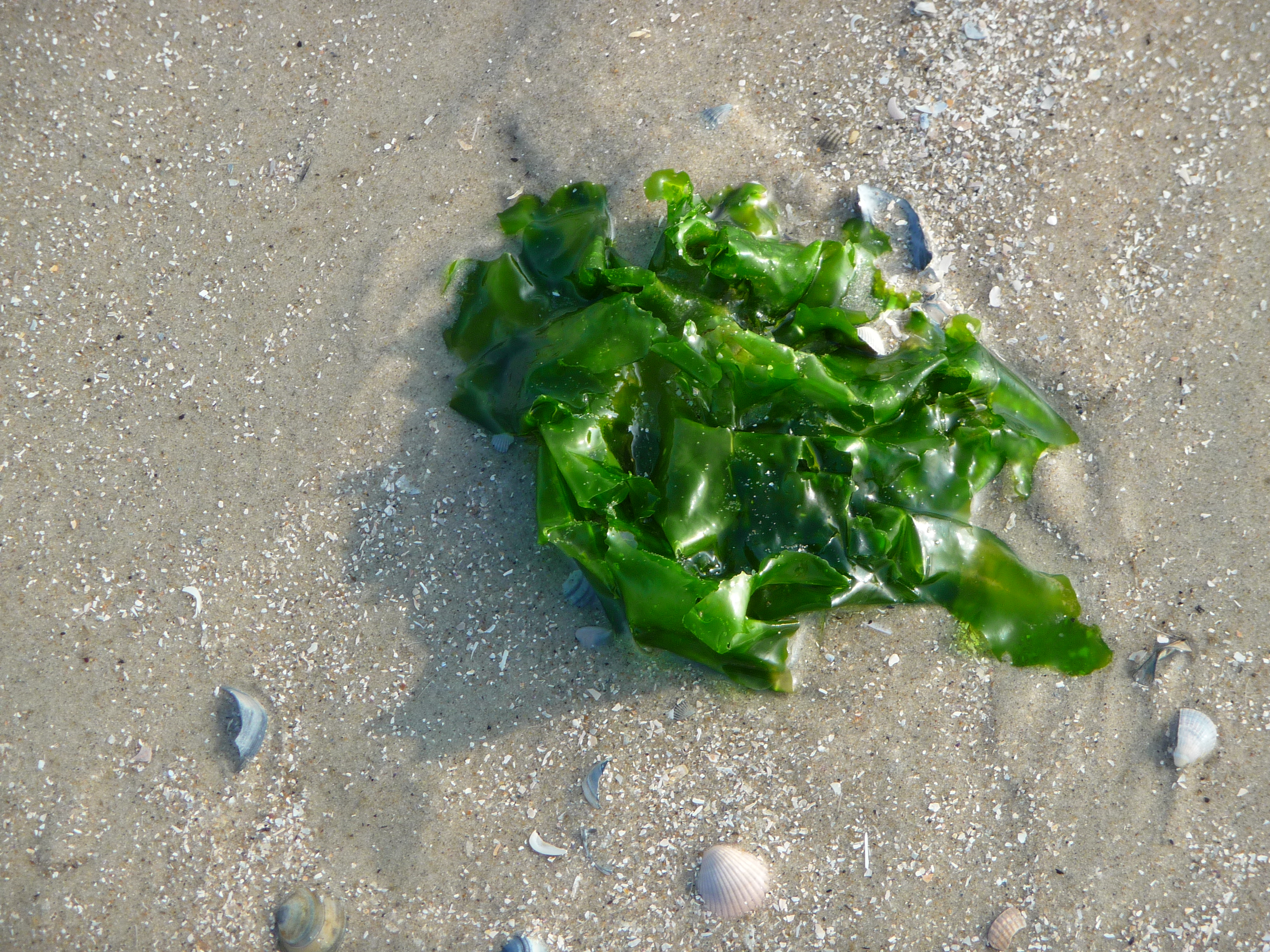
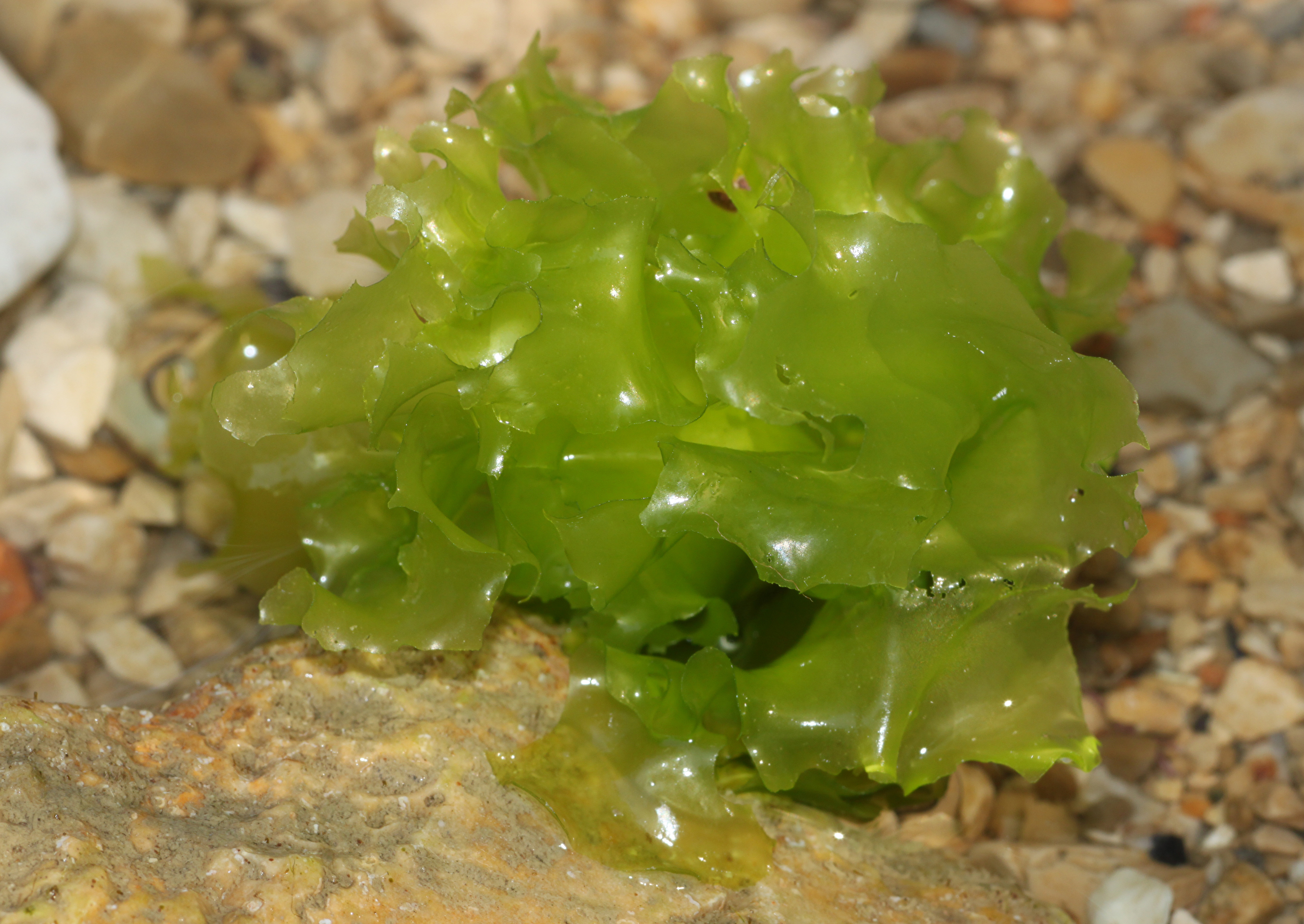
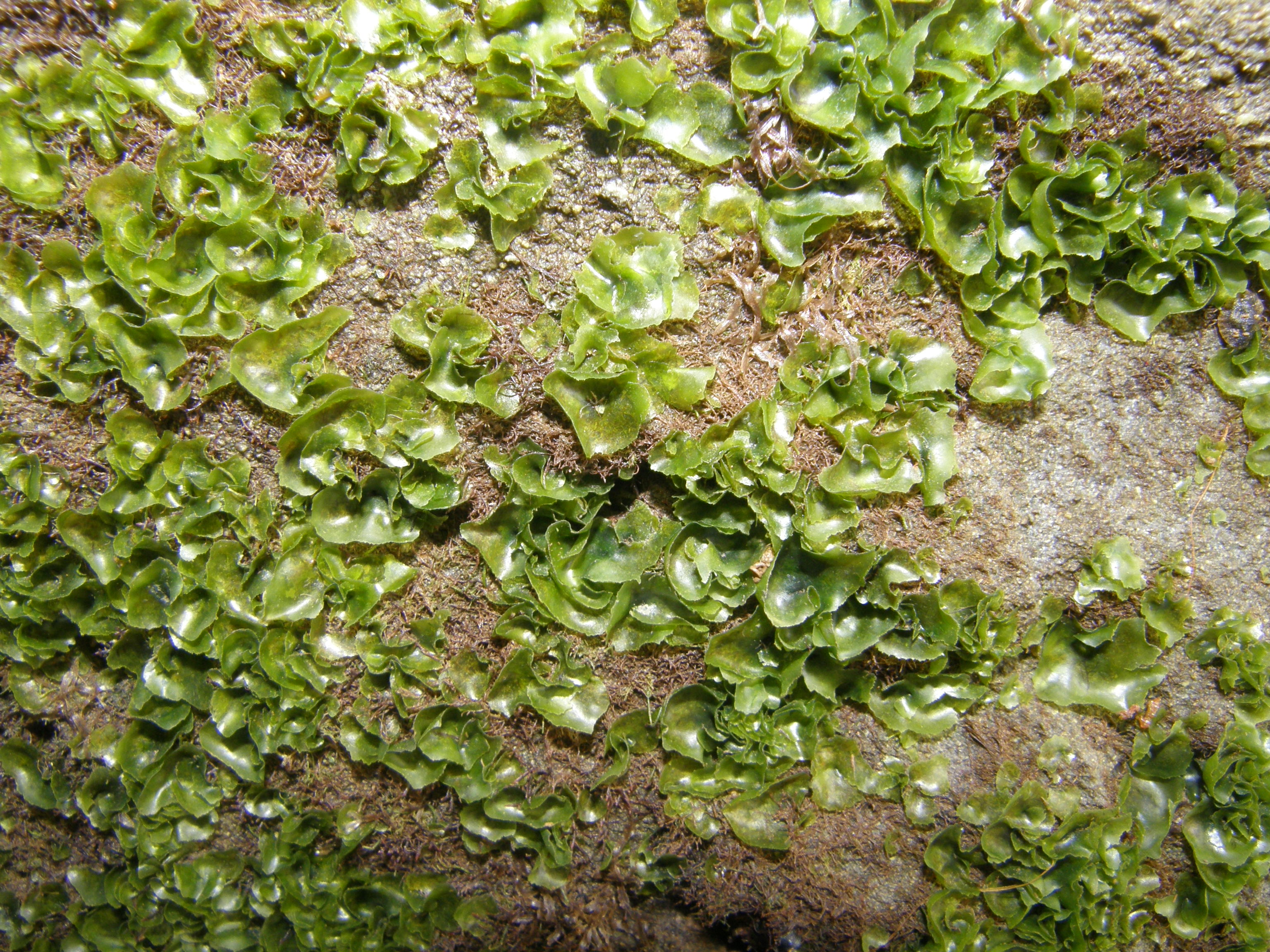
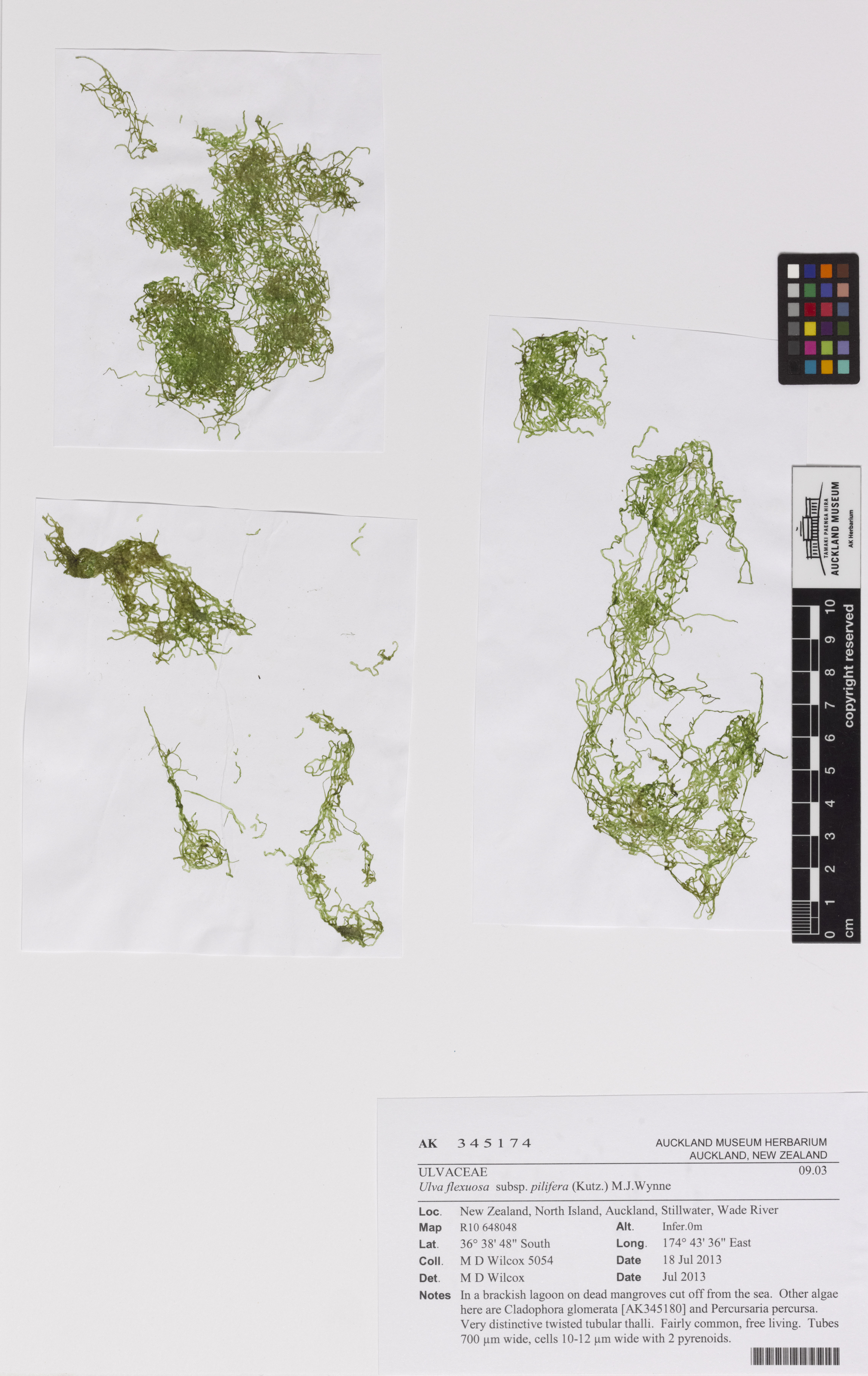
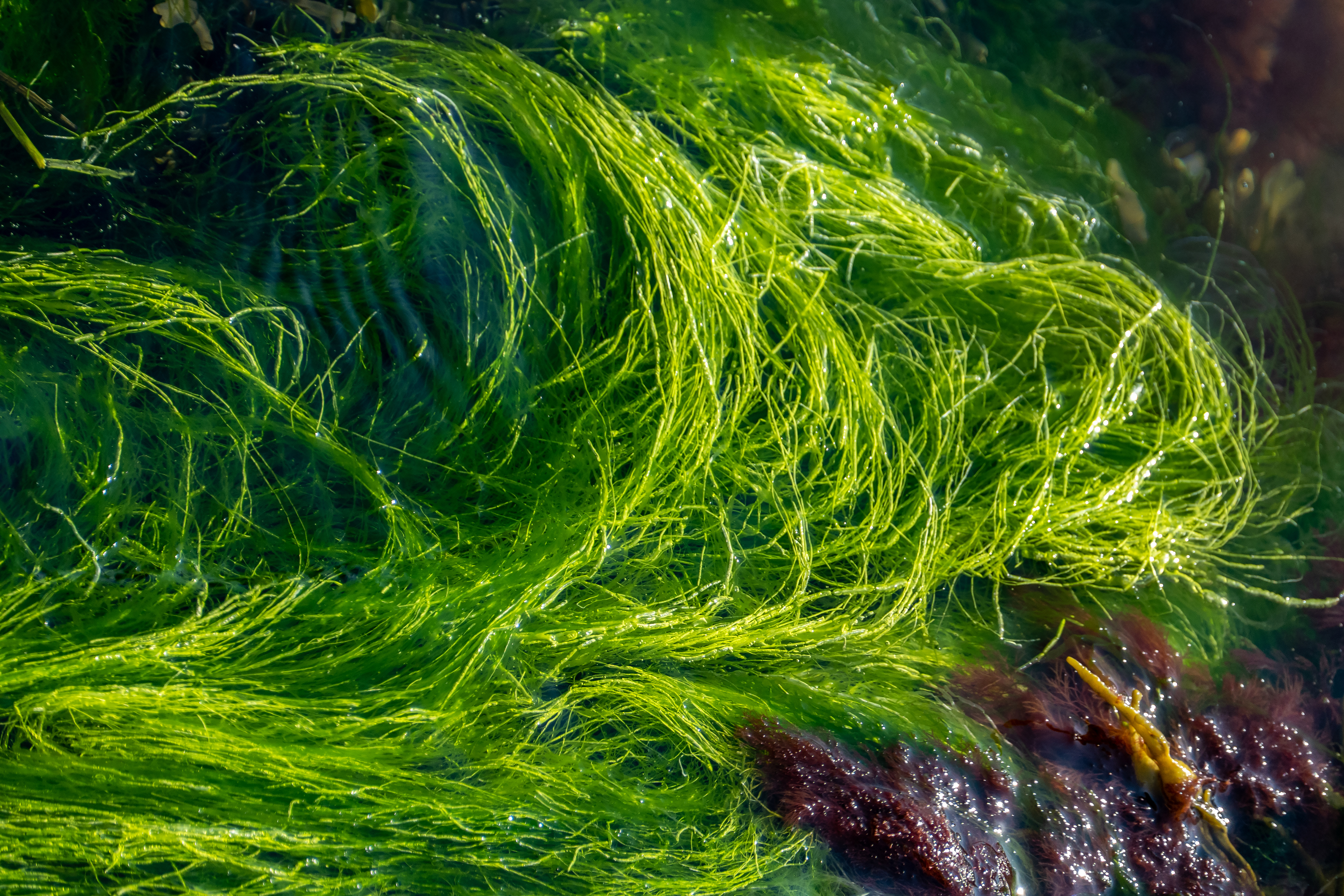
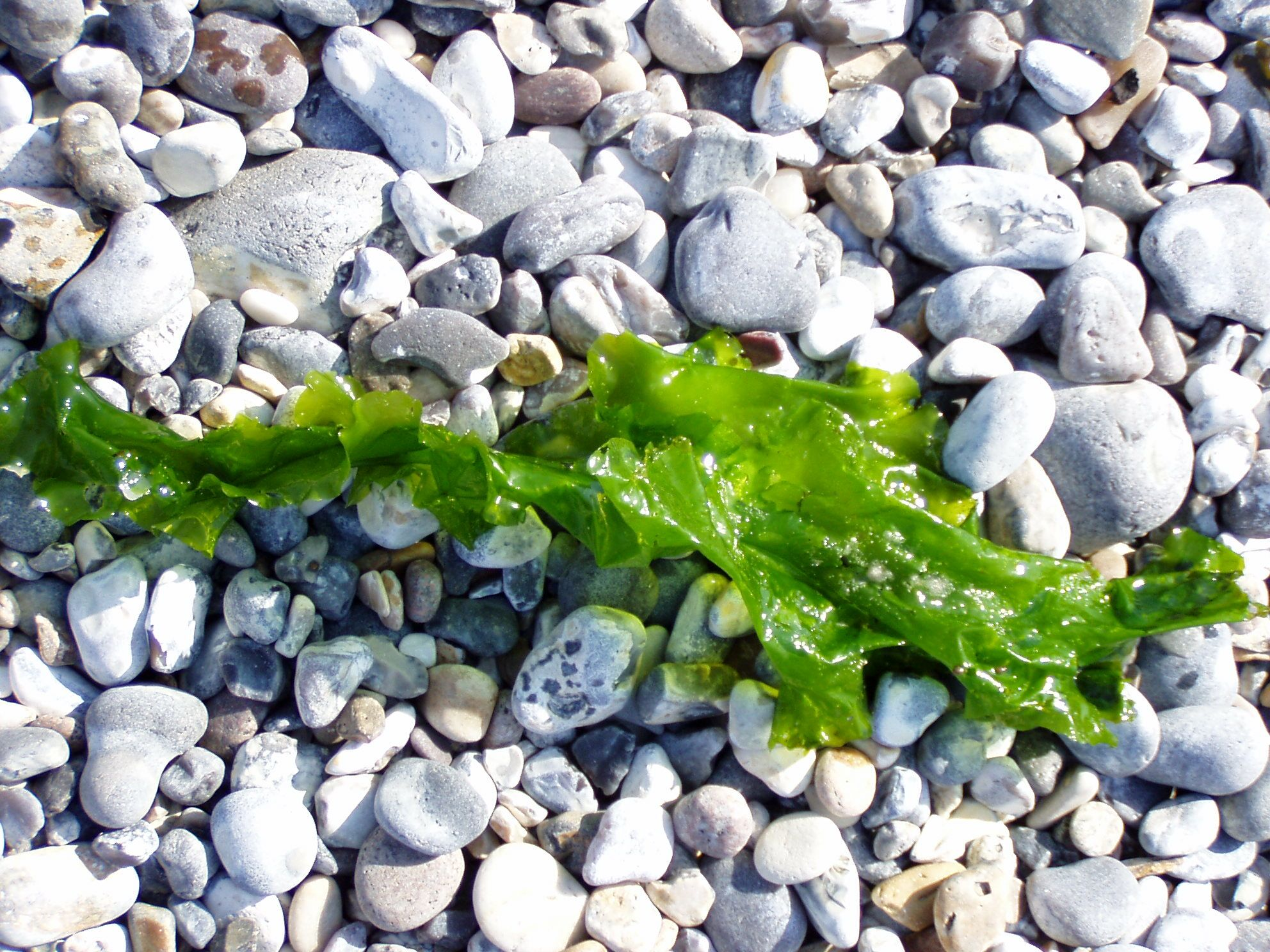
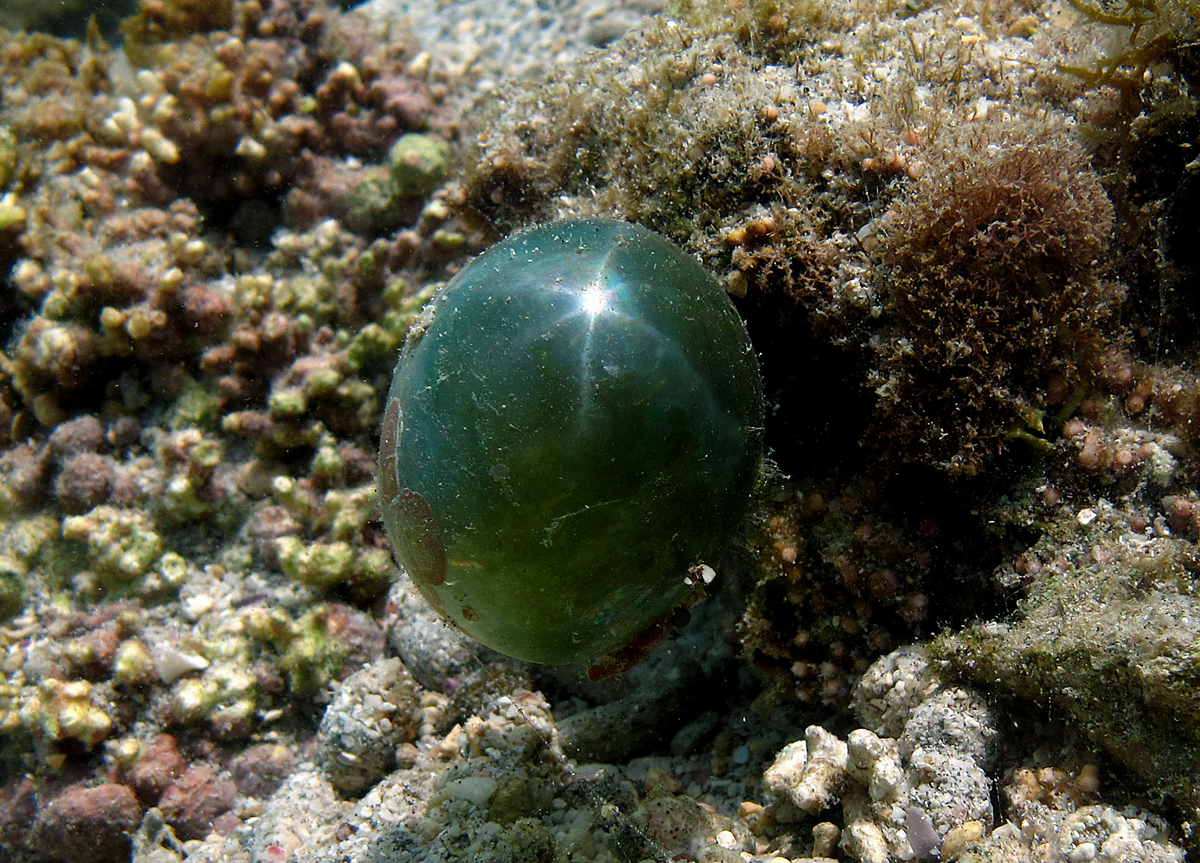
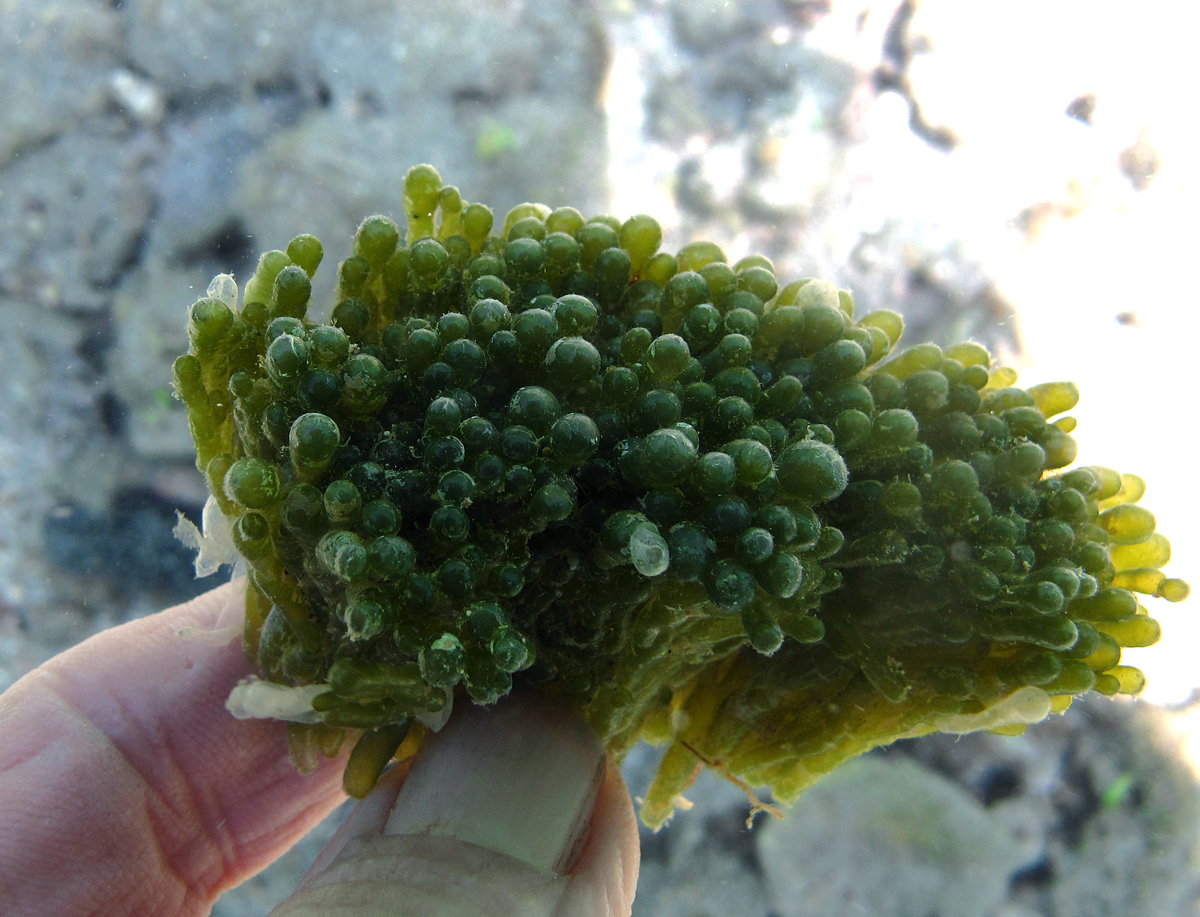
| Common name | Image | Taxonomy | Care Level | Growth rate | Nutrient uptake | Lighting | Waterflow | Palatable | Description | Max size |
|---|---|---|---|---|---|---|---|---|---|---|
| Mermaid's wine glass | | Acetabularia sp. | Moderate | Slow | Poor | High | Low | Yes | A beautiful and interesting genus of algae which, unfortunately, tends to be short-lived in aquariums. It grows a disc-like appendage which is more pronounced in certain species, is easily broken when removed from water, and may be removed to start a new colony. A hard surface to attach to as well as calcium supplementation are required to grow the calcified algae. | 4 in (10.2 cm) |
| Basket weave | | Anadyomene sp. | Moderate | Slow | Poor | Moderate | Moderate | To some fish | Most specimens make their way into aquariums through live rock and amongst calcareous algae from the wild, staying small in captivity. It possesses rigid, variable, irregularly shaped blades which are characterized by their patterned veins. Anadyomene saldanhae and Anadyomene stellata are the most popular species of this genus. | 10 in (25.4 cm) |
| Fan weed | | Avrainvillea sp. | | | | | | | This species of algae grows a central stalk supporting a single, fan-shaped blade. |
| Green sea sausage seaweed | | Bornetella nitida | Moderate | | | Moderate | Low | Not really | In the wild, this algae grows in shallow water environments such as tide pools and on tumbling beach rocks. It features firm, yet elastic fronds which grow vertically and take on a reddish coloration during their growth stage. Provided with an environment suitable for soft corals, the algae will grow in its most desirable shape. | 2 in (5.1 cm) |
| Spherical turtle shell | | Bornetella sphaerica | Moderate | | | Moderate | Low | Not really | In the wild, this algae grows in shallow water environments such as tide pools and on tumbling beach rocks. It features firm, yet elastic fronds which take on a reddish coloration during their growth stage. Provided with an environment suitable for soft corals, the algae will grow in its most desirable shape. | 2 in (5.1 cm) |
| Bryopsis | | Bryopsis sp. | Easy | Fast | | | | Somewhat | This algae is usually seen as a nuisance though it may be desirable in Macroalgae tanks. Though it is rarely sold on its own, it often enters aquariums through live rock and is hard to eradicate due to its firm grip on rockwork. Its coarse composition aids in accumulating detritus from which it can derive nutrients. Eradication can be achieved through the use of grazers (including several crabs, mollusks, and sea urchins), manual removal, light starvation, and nutrient reduction. Elevated magnesium may hinder the growth of the algae but can be dangerous to invertebrates. |
| Sea fern | | Bryopsis pennata | Easy | Fast | | | | Somewhat | One of the most difficult species of algae to eradicate in the hobby. This algae is characterized by its pronounced midrib and mat-like rhizoids. Compared to Bryopsis plumosa, Bryopsis pennata features more irregular and sparsely branching fronds. | 4 in (10.2 cm) |
| Hen pen | | Bryopsis plumosa | Easy | Fast | | | | Somewhat | One of the most difficult species of algae to eradicate in the hobby. This algae is characterized by its pronounced midrib and mat-like rhizoids. Compared to Bryopsis pennata, Bryopsis plumosa features more symmetrical and densely branching fronds. | 4 in (10.2 cm) |
| Giant feather algae | | Caulerpa asmeadii | Easy | Moderate | Good | Moderate | Low-Moderate | Somewhat | This is a large species of Caulerpa although unlike its relatives, it won't outgrow its environment as it is slow-growing. It features a thick rhizome which should be pinched when pruned to reduce the amount of pollutants released. Younger individuals may be confused with Caulerpa sertularioides, which inhabits shallower habitats and both may be sold as Feather algae. | 14 in (35.6 cm) |
| Sea mustard | | Caulerpa brachypus | Easy | Fast | Good | Moderate-High | Moderate | Somewhat | Also known as Mini caulerpa. Though this uncommon species of Caulerpa is more palatable than Caulerpa prolifera, herbivorous fish tend not to consume it. It will attach itself to both rocks and sand substrates with rhizoids, is a good refugium addition for nutrient export and housing microinvertebrates, and requires regular pruning. | 1 in (2.5 cm) |
| Umbrella algae | | Caulerpa chemnitzia | Easy | Fast | Excellent | Moderate | Moderate-High | Not really | Rarely seen in the hobby and can be found in dim habitats in the wild. The algae is excellent at stripping a tank of nutrients so it must be carefully monitored. Two varieties exist, one with smooth, round blades and the other with concave blades. Was known as Caulerpa peltata and also may be called Saucer algae and Mushroom algae. | 6 in (15.2 cm) |
| Zipper algae | | Caulerpa cupressoides | Easy | Slow | Fair | Moderate-High | Moderate | No | This interesting and undemanding species of Caulerpa prefers to grow on sand, however it can grow off of harder surfaces. The algae features long, stiff stipes bordered by notched blades and is naturally found growing in shallow-water seagrass meadows. Seahorses will readily use its stipes as hitching posts. Also known as Cactus caulerpa. | 8 in (20.3 cm) |
| Banana algae | | Caulerpa cylindracea | Easy | Fast | Excellent | Moderate-High | Moderate-High | No | This tall algae features cylindrical blades, making it resemble a cluster of bananas, as well as a dark green coloration. It is excellent at stripping a tank of nutrients so its size must be limited. Though it is mostly inedible, some fish may nip at its holdfast. | 6 in (15.2 cm) |
| Razor algae | | Caulerpa floridana | Easy | | | Moderate | | | This algae, also known as Florida caulerpa, originates from shallow environments such as lagoons and bays and enters aquariums through Caribbean and Floridian live rock. It is not very popular in the hobby. |
| Small sea grapes | | Caulerpa lentillifera | Moderate | Fast | | High | Moderate | Yes | This species of Caulerpa prefers to grow on rockwork though it may venture out onto the substrate. Under strong lighting, it will grow dense blades, resembling clusters of grapes. Additionally, it is known to be edible to humans and is also called Green caviar, Latok, and Umibudo. | 6 in (15.2 cm) |
| Fern algae | | Caulerpa mexicana | Easy | Moderate | Good | Moderate | Low-Moderate | Somewhat to fish | This species of tight-bladed Caulerpa can grow on hard surfaces as well as sandy and muddy substrates. In turbulent surroundings, it grows somewhat compact and in calmer surroundings, it grows taller. Its adaptability to lighting requirements allows it to grow in environments without direct lighting amongst other algae (such as under ledges). | 8 in (20.3 cm) |
| Coin Caulerpa | | Caulerpa nummularia | | | | | | | This algae can be maintained in a refugium with constant exposure to light and regular pruning every few weeks. It uses a rhizome to anchor to rocks and substrate and can be very difficult to remove once established. | ≤1 cm (0.4 in) |
| Palm tree algae | | Caulerpa paspaloides | Easy | Moderate | Excellent | Moderate | Low-Moderate | Somewhat | This species of Caulerpa is a good nutrient export choice as it pollutes aquariums less often than its relatives and is fast growing. It should be pruned regularly as its fine structure captures undesirable substances. Under more intense lighting, the algae's palm-shaped blades will grow more compact and triangular in addition to taking on a darker shade of green. | 12 in (30.5 cm) |
| Bladed sand moss | | Caulerpa prolifera | Easy | Fast | Excellent | Moderate | Low-Moderate | Somewhat | Bladed sand moss is well-suited for aquariums as it grows slower than other members of its genus and is easily pruned. It desires sandy substrates, inhabiting seagrass meadows in the wild, and will grow wider blades in turbulent water and taller, thinner blades in calmer environments. Out of all the Caulerpa species that are commercially available, this one is the most popular and widespread, commonly used to cover sand beds in marine planted aquariums. | 6 in (15.2 cm) |
| Coarse sea grapes | | Caulerpa racemosa | Easy | Fast | Excellent | Moderate-High | Moderate-High | Somewhat | Unlike other species of Caulerpa, this one grows round, clustered blades. It is notorious for releasing spores and stripping tanks of available nutrients as well as its invasively rapid growth (having given the entire Caulerpa genus a bad rap). As such, it must be carefully monitored and pruned. Many varieties of this algae exist worldwide which are highly varied and inhabit shallow-water environments. | 8 in (20.3 cm) |
| Sawtooth algae | | Caulerpa serrulata | Easy | Moderate | Good | Moderate | Low-Moderate | Somewhat | This smaller sized, hardy species of algae is often available and put in refugiums for nutrient export or used to create thick bushes in the foreground of an aquarium. It originates from shallow habitats where it prefers to grow on small rocky objects and its stiff nature makes it unappetizing to most organisms. Weaker lighting will lessen the jaggedness of its twisted blades. | 5 in (12.7 cm) |
| Green feather algae | | Caulerpa sertularioides | Easy | Fast | Excellent | Moderate | Low-Moderate | Yes | This shallow-water Caulerpa species features fronds with rounded tips. It is very popular among hobbyists although it grows quickly, easily taking over aquariums. However, it is a great choice for refugiums considering how many fish and invertebrates enjoy eating it. The algae prefers to grow on hard surfaces, yet its adaptability allows it to also grow on the sand bed and climb aquarium walls. | 8 in (20.3 cm) |
| Killer algae | | Caulerpa taxifolia | Easy | Fast | Excellent | Moderate | Low-Moderate | No | Also known as Fern algae and Feather plant, this algae can become quite invasive in the wild as it is able to survive in a wide range of temperatures and grows rapidly. For this reason, it is rare within the United States. It appears similar to Caulerpa mexicana although its dark-green fronds are more uniform and spaced further apart. The algae will spread on both rocks and sand. | 10 in (25.4 cm) |
| Fluffy green seaweed | | Caulerpa verticillata | Easy | Fast | | Low-High | | | Though this is a rather short species of the Caulerpa genus, Fluffy green seaweed or Fuzzy caulerpa can grow extremely quickly, even on walls. As such, it is only suitable for marine planted aquariums. Regular pruning should be performed by twirling the algae's blades around one's fingers, separating it's holdfast from hard surfaces. Amphipods and copepods enjoy living within the algae. | 5.9 in (15.0 cm) |
| Spaghetti algae | | Chaetomorpha sp. | Easy | Fast | Excellent | Low-High | Moderate | Not really | Also called Chaeto, this algae grows as a tangled mass of green filaments and originates from shallow, nutrient rich environments. It is incredibly popular with aquarists since it serves as habitat for microinvertebrates (such as amphipods and copepods) and rapidly consumes excess nutrients (though care must be taken to replenish these nutrients such as iron, nitrates, and phosphates). For this reason, it is often kept in a refugium where it can either be tumbled or left to float. Despite being hardy and easy to grow, care must be taken to meet the different environmental requirements of the different species of Spaghetti algae. | 24 in (61.0 cm) mound |
| Tall hair alga | | Chaetomorpha aerea | Easy | Fast | Excellent | Moderate | Moderate | Yes | Once known as Chaetomorpha crassa. It is rare example of a hair algae species suitable for marine aquariums, being an excellent refugium addition. In captivity, the stiff, filamentous algae serves as habitat for microinvertebrates, provides nutrient export, and can be fed to herbivores, though it should ideally be tumbled. Naturally, this algae is found in the intertidal zone. | 6 in (15.2 cm) mound |
| Floating chaeto | | Chaetomorpha linum | Easy | Fast | Excellent | Moderate-High | Moderate | No | Also known as Spaghetti algae. This stable, greenish algae is composed of unbranched, tangled filaments, finer and more flexible than those of Chaetomorpha spiralis. It is excellent at nutrient export, but care must be taken to replenish said nutrients in a system containing Chaetomorpha linum, such as nitrate, phosphate, Magnesium, Iodine, and Iron. Additionally, herbivorous fish cannot digest this algae, though they might attempt to eat it. | 16 in (40.6 cm) |
| Curly Chaeto | | Chaetomorpha spiralis | Moderate | Fast | Excellent | High | Moderate | | Also known as Spaghetti algae and Green hair algae (not Derbesia). This hardy algae is composed of clumped, long filaments, thicker and more brittle than those of Chaetomorpha linum. It is an excellent addition for refugiums, serving as habitat for microinvertebrates and providing nutrient export. | 20 in (50.8 cm) |
| Green tide alga | | Cladophora coelothrix | | | | High | | | This algae is composed of compacted filaments, forming a sphere. It does best in cooler water. | 20 in (50.8 cm) |
| Toadstool algae | | Cladophora prolifera | Easy | Slow | Poor | Moderate-High | Low-High | Somewhat | This species of shallow-water algae grows in clumps on rocks and rubble, featuring rigid, finely branched filaments. Many aquarists believe it is a nuisance since it will become hard to remove after establishing itself. However, microinvertebrates enjoy living within the algae, such as starfish. May also be called Green bush, Moss ball, and Sea hair. | 20 in (50.8 cm) |
| Green wiry algae | | Cladophoropsis sp. | | Slow | | | | Yes | This low-lying algae creeps along rocks and can be difficult to remove. Often, it is found on frags and live rock. It is known to persist in low-nutrient environments. Also known as Bob Ross algae. |
| Turtleweed | | Chlorodesmis sp. | Expert | Moderate | Good | High | Moderate-High | No | Also known as Maiden's hair plant, this popular, stringy algae is often mistaken for hair algae and enters the aquarium trade on live rock and coral. It is toxic, making it inedible and capable of effecting coral growth, though microinvertebrates enjoy living within the algae such as amphipods and copepods. If the blades of the algae turn white, they should be removed. | 8 in (20.3 cm) |
| Dead man's fingers | | Codium sp. | Easy | Slow | Fair | Moderate-High | High | No | Some forms of this algae feature a single holdfast with multiple irregular branches and others encrust surfaces taking on a blob-like shape. They should be placed on hard surfaces and kept in water temperatures under 80 °F (26.7 °C). Though the main structure of Dead man's fingers is inedible, some fish may graze on the fuzzy filaments that cover its surface. | 12 in (30.5 cm) |
| Green fleece | | Codium decorticatum | Easy | Slow | | High | Low | Not really | This desirable algae features thick, fingerlike protrusions that provide habitat for microcrustaceans and can break apart if disturbed. Though it floats, it can be attached to solid surfaces with superglue. In nature, it is distributed worldwide in shallow waters, though it is rare in the aquarium hobby. | 12 in (30.5 cm) |
| Tufted joint algae | | Cymopolia barbata | Moderate | Slow | Fair | High | Moderate-High | Not really | This species of prehistoric-looking algae is rarely available although it may enter aquariums through live rock. It is quite interesting, but requires calcium supplementation as it is calcified. Pieces of the algae may be clipped and fed to Tangs and Rabbitfish. Also known as Palm tree algae. | 12 in (30.5 cm) |
| Usugasane | | Cymopolia vanbosseae | Easy | | | Moderate | Moderate | | In the wild, this algae grows in shallow water environments. It is calcified and its base is white due to the lack of Chlorophyll. In the aquarium, this algae will deteriorate if other algae is allowed to grow on its surface and should be exposed to fluorescent lighting for dense frond growth (though the algae can be grown under LED lighting). | 2 in (5.1 cm) |
| Green hair algae | | Derbesia sp. | | Fast | Excellent | | High | Yes | Green hair algae is the desired algae in algae scrubbers for nutrient export and the rearing of microinvertebrates. Outside scrubbers, it is a pest and is distinguished from similar algae by its lack of a root system, delicate nature, and fine texture. Removal is simple as it can be pulled or scrubbed off rockwork and sifted from sand and is highly palatable to a variety of herbivores. Proper water quality and low nutrient levels also discourage the growth of this algae as does lighting that is less red. |
| Green bubble weed | | Dictyosphaeria cavernosa | | | | Various | | Somewhat | In the wild, this green to bluish algae thrives in rocky crevices where detritus can accumulate. It will tolerate a variety of lighting intensities and survive in aquariums with low nutrient levels. The algae is made up of easily-seen, bubble shaped cells which, when ruptured, release new cells that will settle throughout an aquarium system. | 5 in (12.7 cm) |
| Isosugina | | Halicoryne wrightii | | | | Moderate | Low | Yes | In the wild, this algae grows in shallow water environments such as tide pools and on tumbling beach rocks. The algae's yellow-green coloration is a result of limestone deposits on its fronds which requires specific Carbonate hardness levels to form. This algae will become weakened if other algae is allowed to grow on its surface. | 2 in (5.1 cm) |
| Large leaf watercress algae | | Halimeda discoidea | Easy | Moderate | Fair | Moderate-High | Moderate | Somewhat | Out of all the Halimeda species, this one possesses the largest segments and unlike its relatives, only grows on hard surfaces. It requires calcium supplementation as it is calcified, making it a good food for grazers (such as Tangs) as it helps keep their digestive tracts free of blockages. Also known as Money plant and Rosette halimeda. | 10 in (25.4 cm) |
| Three finger leaf algae | | Halimeda incrassata | Easy | Moderate | Fair | Moderate-High | Moderate | No | Also known as Money plant, this algae either grows in clumps or forms several branches. It requires calcium supplementation as it is calcified (making it a good food for clearing blockages in the digestive tracts of grazers) and a sand bed at least 4 in (10.2 cm) deep. While generally small, this algae will rapidly reproduce under favorable conditions, sprouting new individuals near its base. | 8 in (20.3 cm) |
| Jointed-stalk algae | | Halimeda monile | | Slow | Fair | Low-High | | No | This algae is ideal for use in aquascaping as it is inedible. Though it can be housed under a wide range of lighting strengths, it grows best under Moderate-High lighting and prefers to grow in finer substrates. It also requires calcium supplementation as it is calcified. Individuals will appear stressed when they attempt to spread, using the majority of their energy to produce new growth. | 8 in (20.3 cm) |
| Prickly pear | | Halimeda opuntia | Easy | Moderate | Fair | Moderate-High | Moderate | No | This algae forms large mounds of tight segments and attaches itself to rocks and sand using several holdfasts. It requires calcium supplementation as it is calcified (making it a good food for clearing blockages in the digestive tracts of grazers). However, under the right conditions, it can be used to form a ground cover. Also known as Money plant, Carpeting halimeda, and Watercress alga. | 10 in (25.4 cm) |
| Money plant | | Halimeda scabra | | | | Low-High | | | This algae is named after its coin-shaped segments. Though it can be housed under a wide range of lighting strengths, it grows best under Moderate-High lighting. It also requires calcium supplementation. | 5 in (12.7 cm) |
| Cactus algae | | Halimeda tuna | | | | Low-High | | | Cactus algae is common on reefs and is amongst the most imported species of the Halimeda genus for aquariums. Though this algae can be housed under a wide range of lighting strengths, it grows best under Moderate-High lighting. It requires calcium supplementation as it is calcified, making it a good food for grazers (such as Tangs) as it helps keep their digestive tracts free of blockages. Also known as Money plant. | 5 in (12.7 cm) |
| Ringed finger seaweed | | Neomeris annulata | Moderate | Slow | Fair | Moderate | Low | Somewhat | This species of spongy, fuzzy algae grows in small clusters or individually and spreads by extending its holdfast on rockwork or Mangrove roots and growing new fronds. It is lightly calcified and should be provided with calcium supplementation. Also known as Finger algae and may become highly invasive. | 4 in (10.2 cm) |
| Mermaid's shaving brush | | Penicillus capitatus | Easy | Moderate | Fair | Moderate-High | Low-Moderate | No | This species of algae generally grows out of the sand bed on reef flats and seagrass meadows, anchoring itself with rhizoids, although it may grow on rocks. It requires a sand bed at least 4 in (10.2 cm) deep along with calcium supplementation like many other calcified stem plants. In aquariums, a mature specimen will often die, only to produce new individuals at its base. | 8 in (20.3 cm) |
| Neptune's shaving brush | | Penicillus dumetosus | Easy | Moderate | Fair | Moderate-High | Low-Moderate | No | This species of Penicillus grows to be larger than others of its own genus and features a more tapered top. In the wild, it grows on reef flats and seagrass meadows, anchoring itself with rhizoids. In the aquarium, it requires a sand bed at least 4 in (10.2 cm) deep and calcium supplementation. A mature specimen will often die, only to produce new individuals at its base. | 8 in (20.3 cm) |
| Flat-top bristle brush | | Penicillus pyriformis | Easy | Moderate | Fair | Moderate-High | Low-Moderate | No | This species of Penicillus grows to be larger than others of its own genus and features a completely flattened top. In the wild, it grows on reef flats and seagrass meadows, anchoring itself with rhizoids. In the aquarium, it requires a sand bed at least 4 in (10.2 cm) deep and calcium supplementation. A mature specimen will often die, only to produce new individuals at its base. | 8 in (20.3 cm) |
| Pinecone algae | | Rhipocephalus phoenix | Easy | Moderate | Fair | Moderate-High | Moderate | No | This pinecone-shaped algae attaches itself to sandy substrate (and occasionally rocks) using a bulb-like structure possessing several rhizoids. It requires a sand bed at least 4 in (10.2 cm) deep and calcium supplementation. In the wild, it grows on reef flats, seagrass meadows, and Halimeda forests. | 6 in (15.2 cm) |
| Mermaid's fan | | Udotea flabellum | Easy | Moderate | Fair | Moderate-High | Moderate | No | This species of calcified algae is very popular and requires a sand bed at least 4 in (10.2 cm) deep along with calcium supplementation. Given that its requirements are met and conditions are favorable, an individual Mermaid's fan will rapidly reproduce, sprouting new individuals from its base. Rhizoids also extend from the base, anchoring the algae. | 12 in (30.5 cm) |
| Fan algae | | Udotea orientalis | Easy | Slow | | High | Low | | This species of algae attaches itself to a sand substrate, preferring the same environment as sand-rooted Halimeda such as Halimeda opuntia. Since it grows slowly, algae can easily grow on this species' surface under poor water quality, weakening it. | 2 in (5.1 cm) |
| Gutweed | | Ulva sp. | Easy | Fast | Excellent | Moderate-High | Low-Moderate | Yes | Gutweed or Tube algae is common in both tropical and temperate waters. The algae forms tube-like blades secured by a single holdfast to hard surfaces and Mangrove roots. In the aquarium, this algae should be kept in water temperatures under 80 °F (26.7 °C) and may be used to feed herbivorous fish. It was previously classified under the genus Enteromorpha. | 10 in (25.4 cm) |
| Sea lettuce | | Ulva sp. | Easy | Fast | Excellent | Moderate-High | Moderate | Yes | Sea lettuce is common in both tropical and temperate waters. The algae forms flat sheets which either anchor themselves with holdfasts or float by trapping pearled air bubbles. Its growth rate is comparable to that of Chaetomorpha, is nearly as popular, and is similarly good at absorbing excess nutrients in aquariums, housing microinvertebrates, and requires iron supplementation. It is usually kept in refugiums and since it is relished by many aquarium inhabitants, it can be harvested there and fed to organisms in display tanks. Care must be taken to protect return pumps when using Sea lettuce since the latter can easily clog the former. | 8 in (20.3 cm) mound |
| Winding nori | | Ulva flexuosa | | | | | | Yes | This algae is filamentous in nature and is great for feeding Sea urchins. Once known as Enteromorpha flexuosa. | 24 in (61.0 cm) |
| Grass lettuce | | Ulva intestinalis | Easy | Fast | Excellent | Moderate-High | Low-Moderate | Yes | Also known as Gutweed and Grass kelp and once known as Enteromorpha intestinalis. This increasingly popular, hardy algae is a good refugium addition and can be fed to fish. Individuals may attach to sand or rocks with a holdfast or be left to float. The algae also serves as habitat for microinvertebrates and seahorses will readily use its filamentous blades as hitching posts. | 12 in (30.5 cm) |
| Common sea lettuce | | Ulva lactuca | Easy | Fast | Excellent | Moderate-High | Moderate | Yes | This popular algae grows in ruffled, thin sheets which, in the event it does not feature a holdfast (which it will slowly develop if attached to a rock), will trap pearled air bubbles and cause it to float. Good nutrient uptake, the ability to house microinvertebrates, and palatability by herbivorous fish are characteristic of the algae as well as the necessity for iron supplementation. In low nutrient environments, it may get stressed and become invasive. | 24 in (61.0 cm) |
| Bubble algae | | Valonia sp. | Expert | Moderate | Good | High | Moderate-High | No | Also known as Sailor's eyeballs, this algae is usually viewed as a pest, often entering aquariums on live rock. It has the ability to choke out corals if it grows too large and unfortunately, very few animals consume it (one of which is the Emerald crab (Mithraculus sculptus)). They may be desirable in marine planted aquariums, however. The algae itself is comprised deep green, spore filled spheres. | 8 in (20.3 cm) |

== Red macroalgae ==
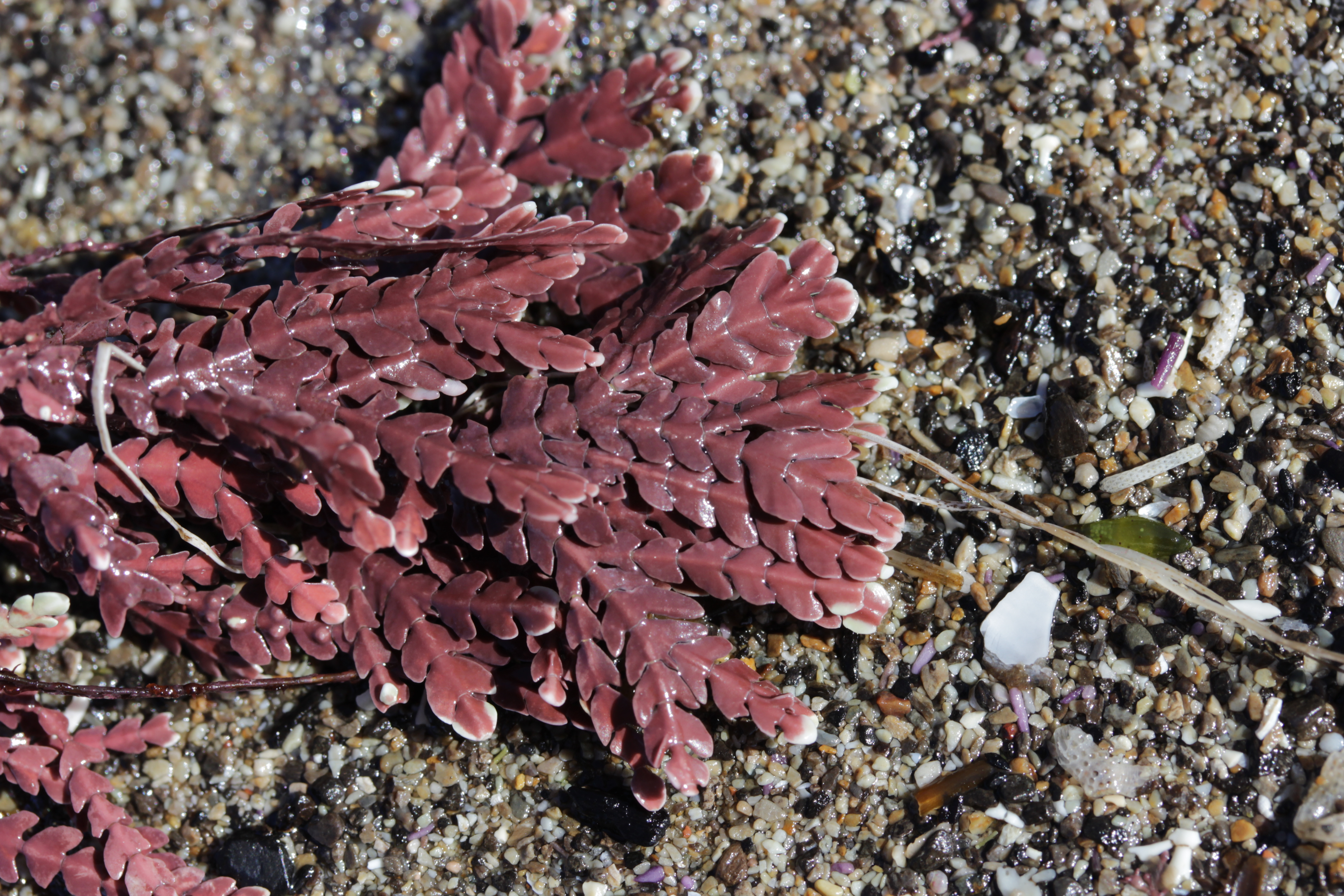
Coralline algae

Red macroalgae are highly sought after in the aquarium trade given their intense coloration and striking appearance. They possess the pigment Phycoerythrin which gives them their vivid coloration ranging from red to orange to blue. For some species, identification is difficult and slight variations due to location and depth may exist.

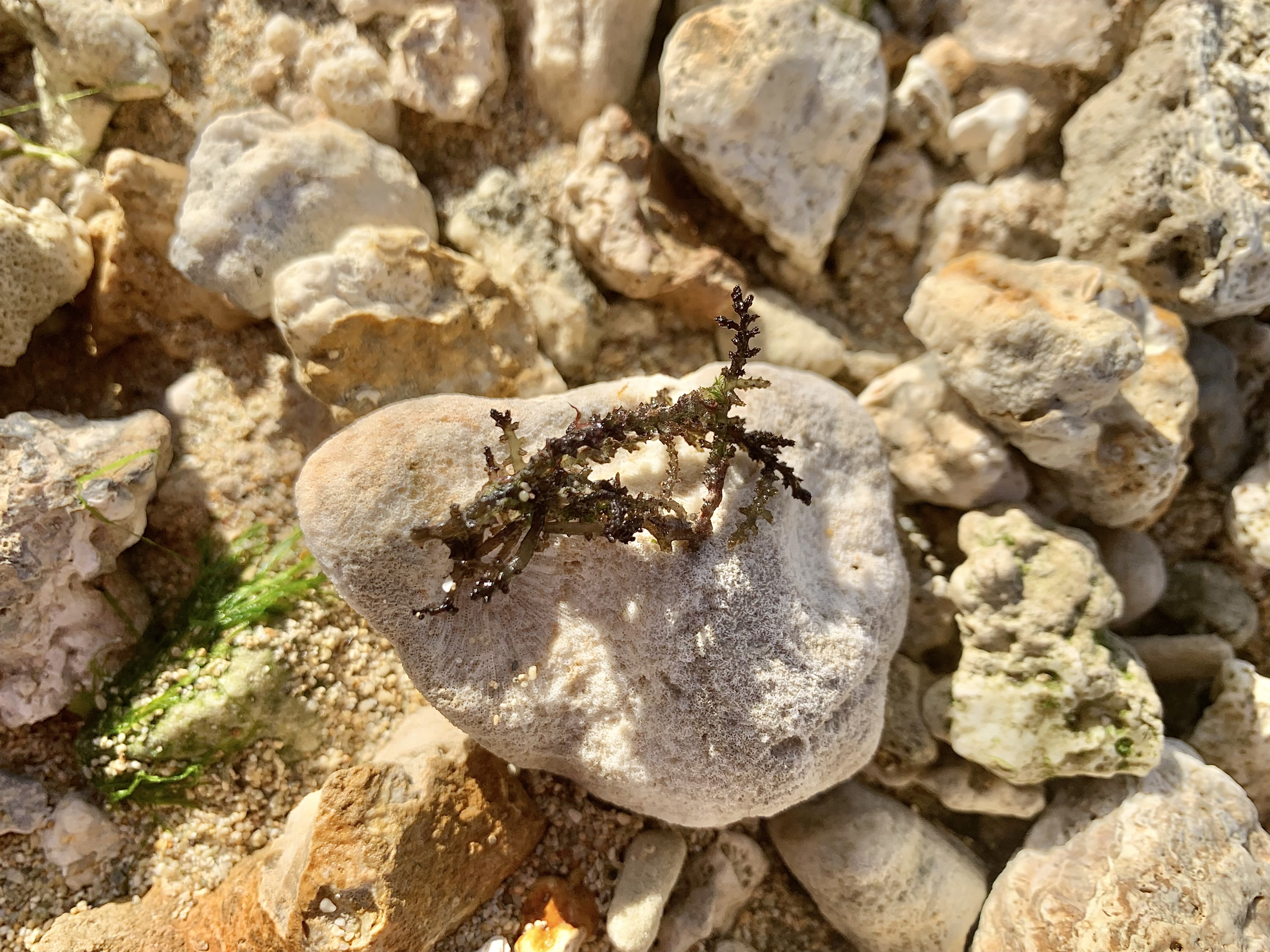
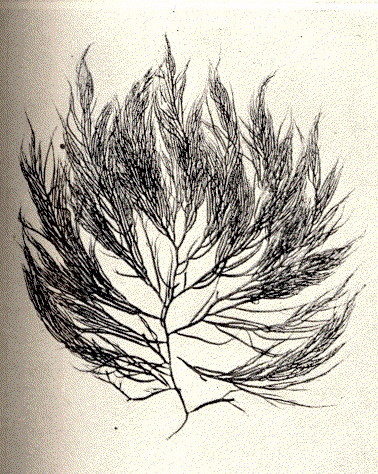
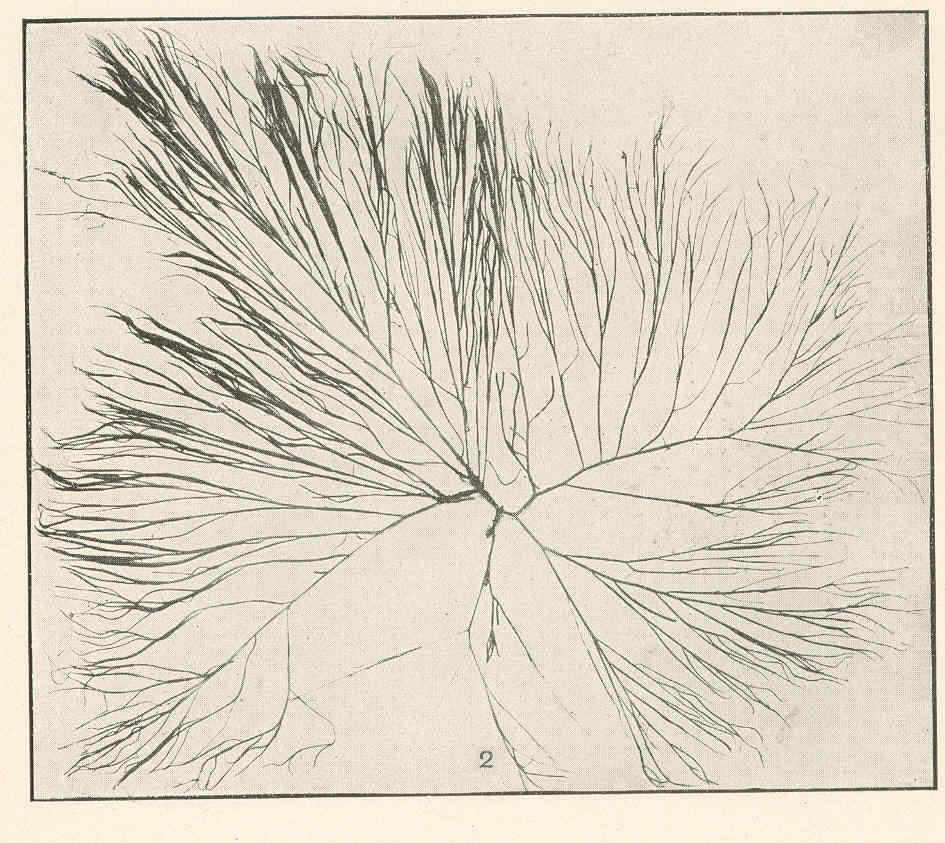
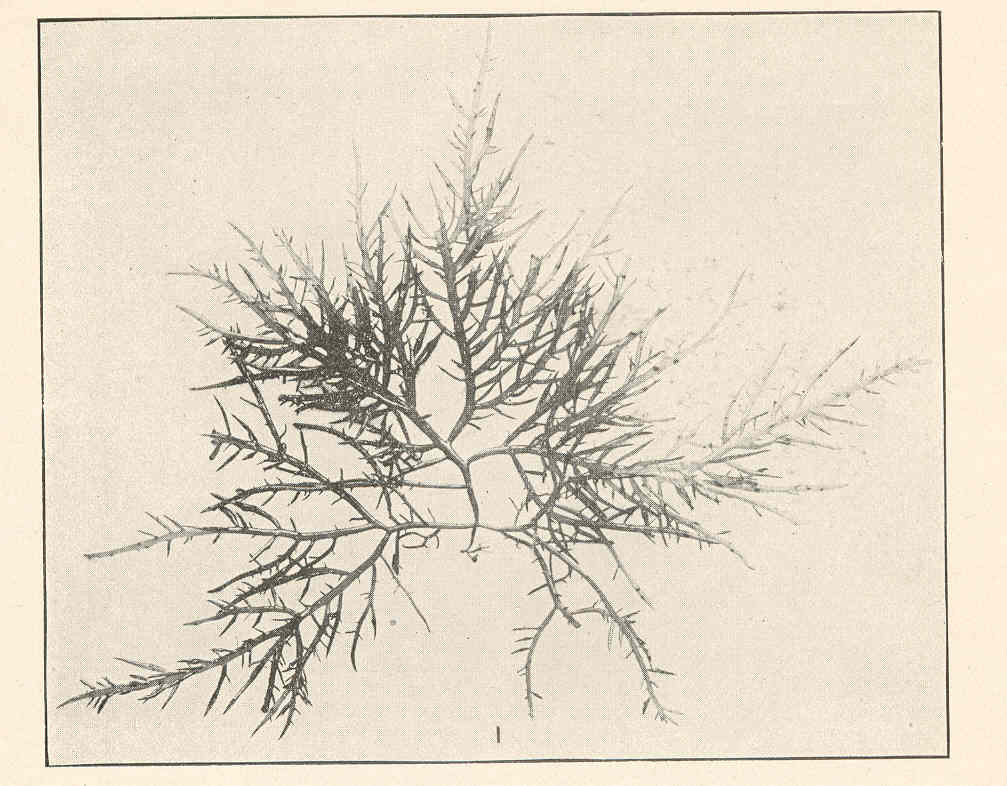
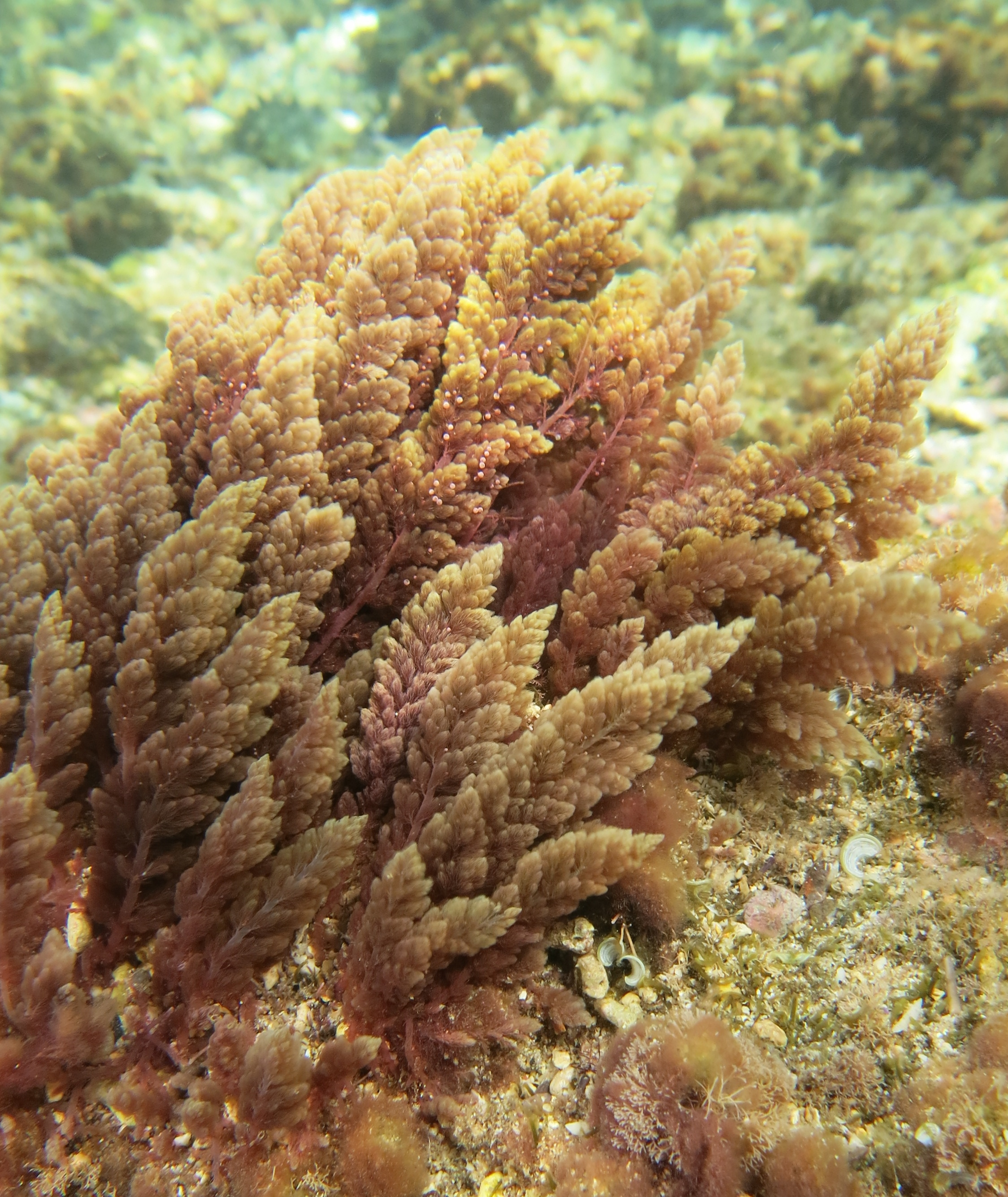
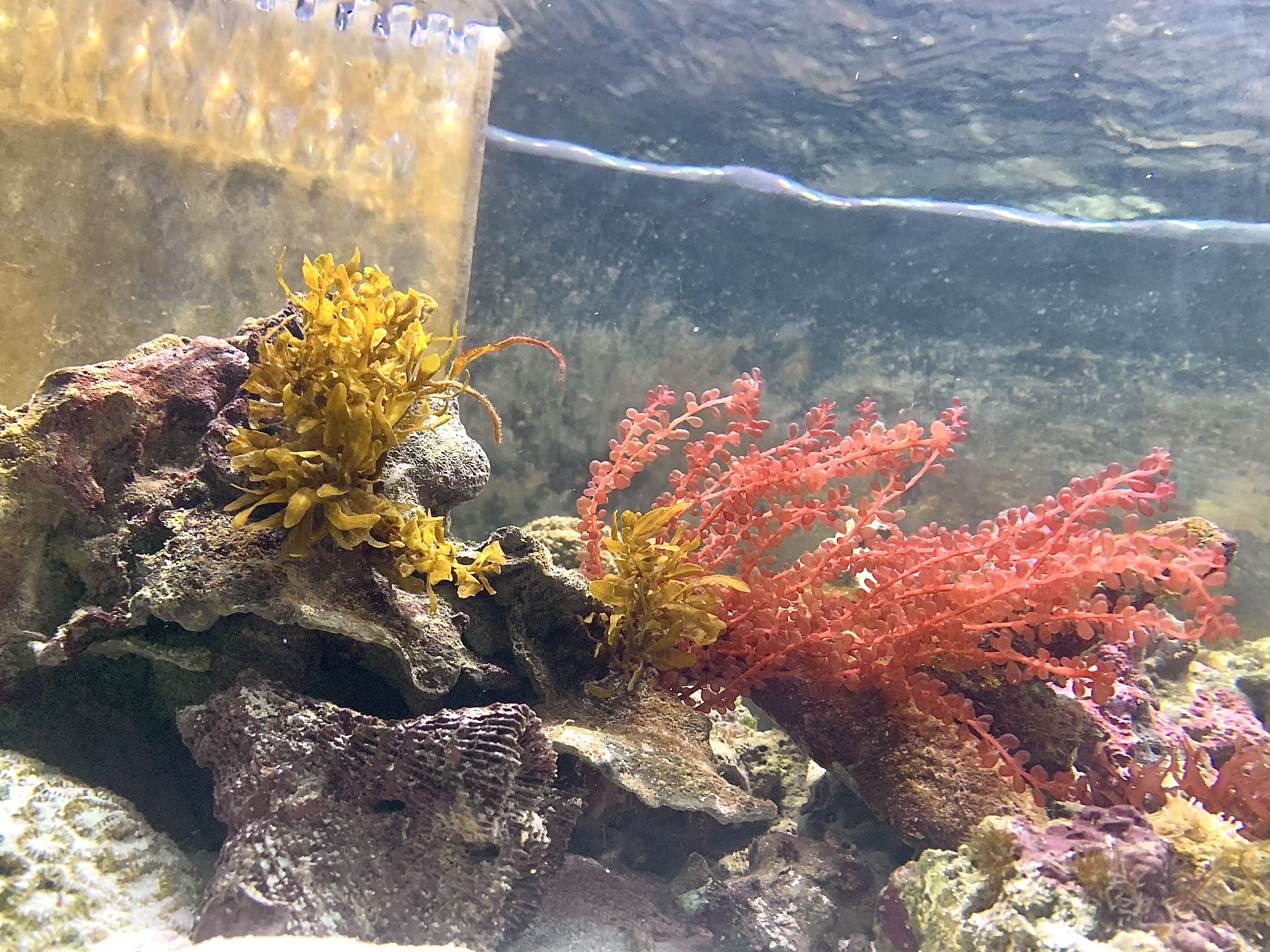
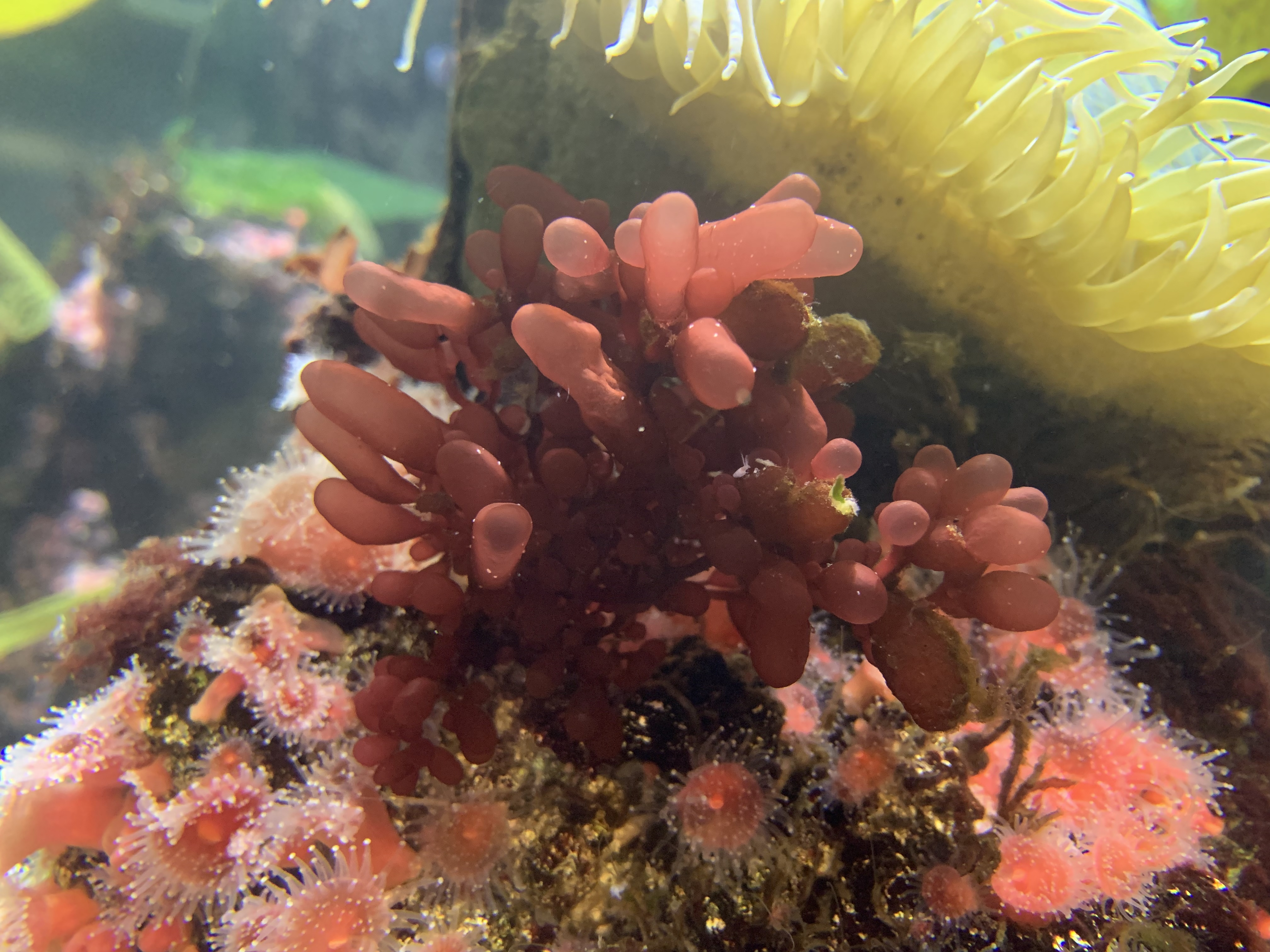
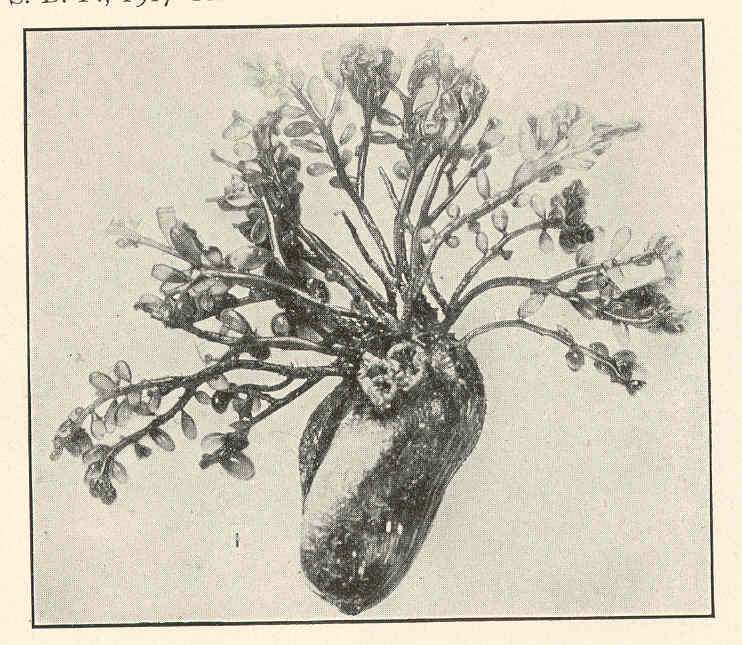
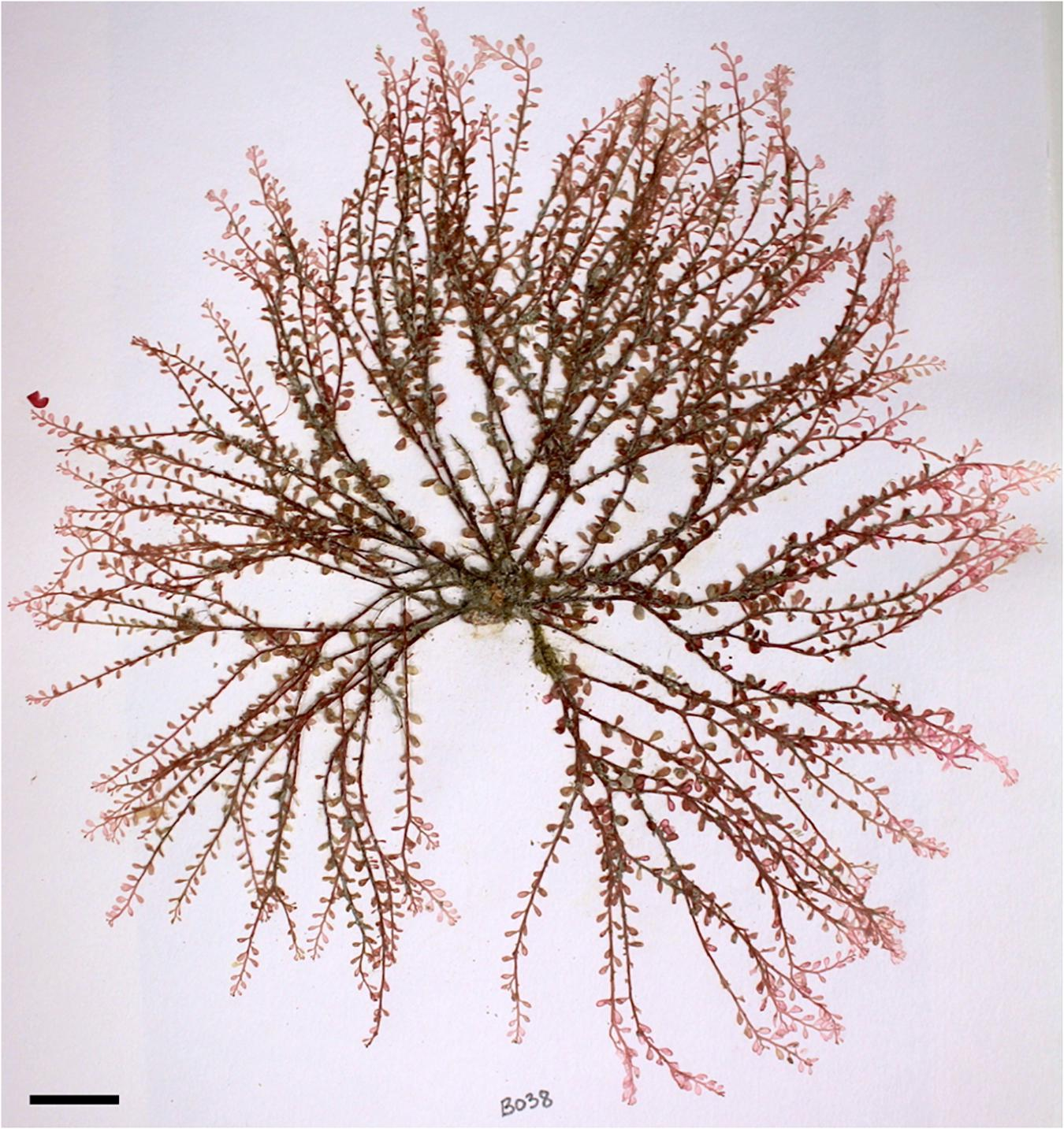
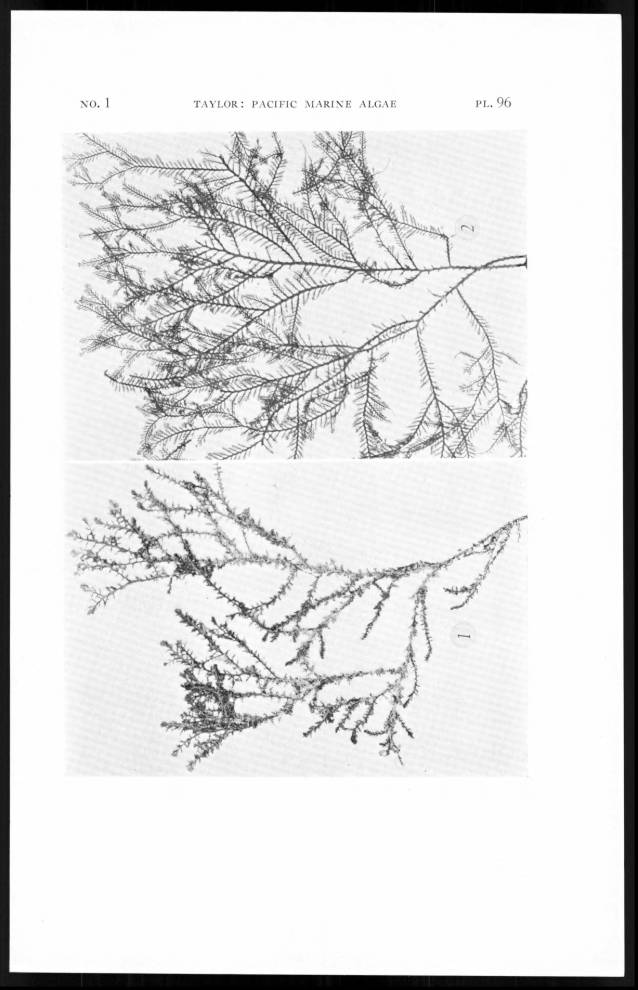
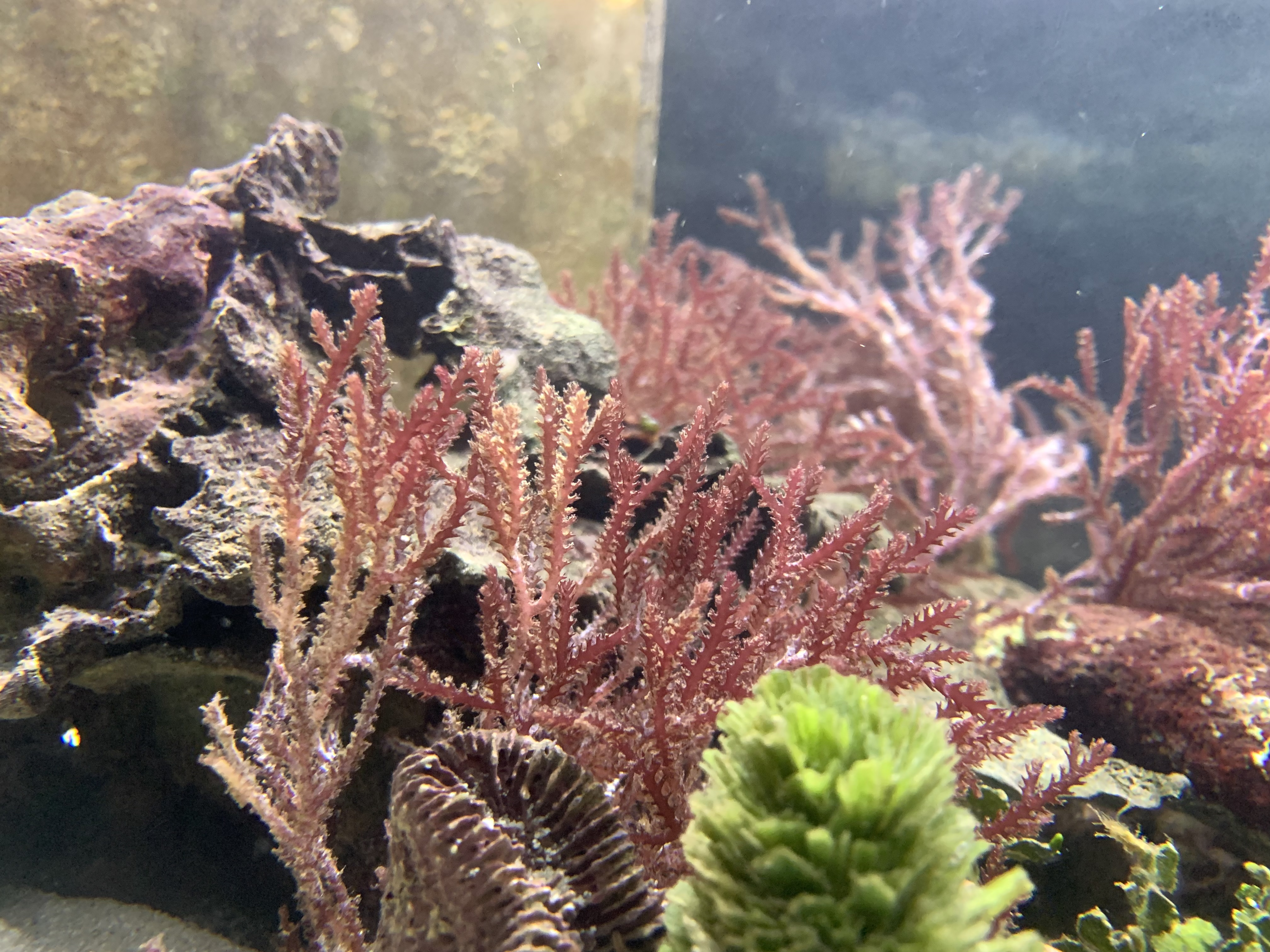
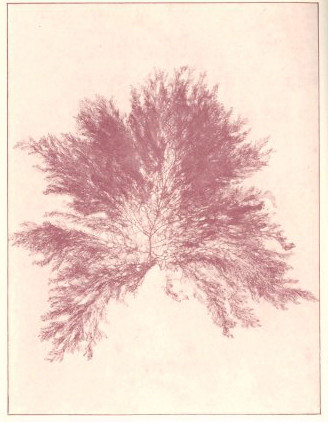
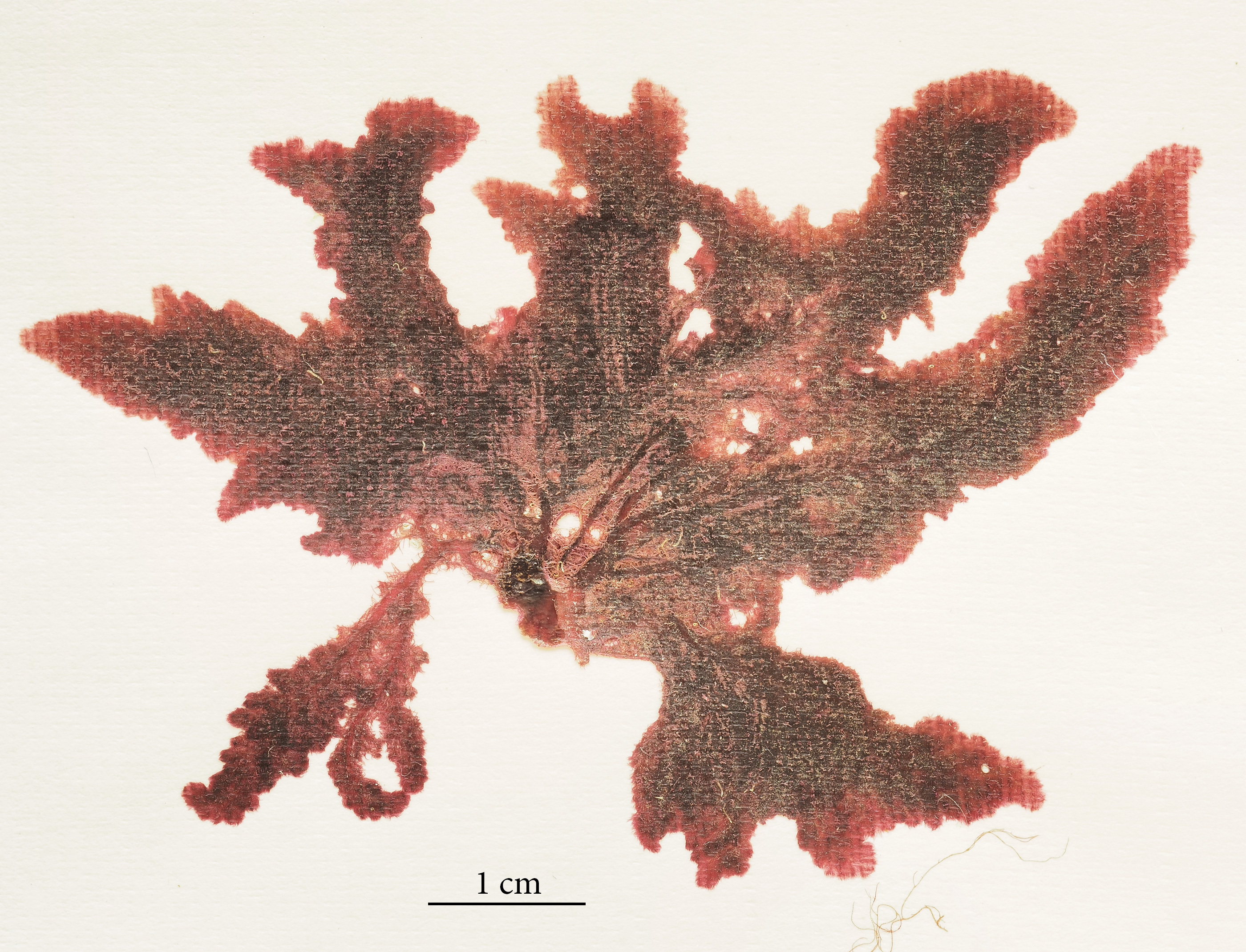
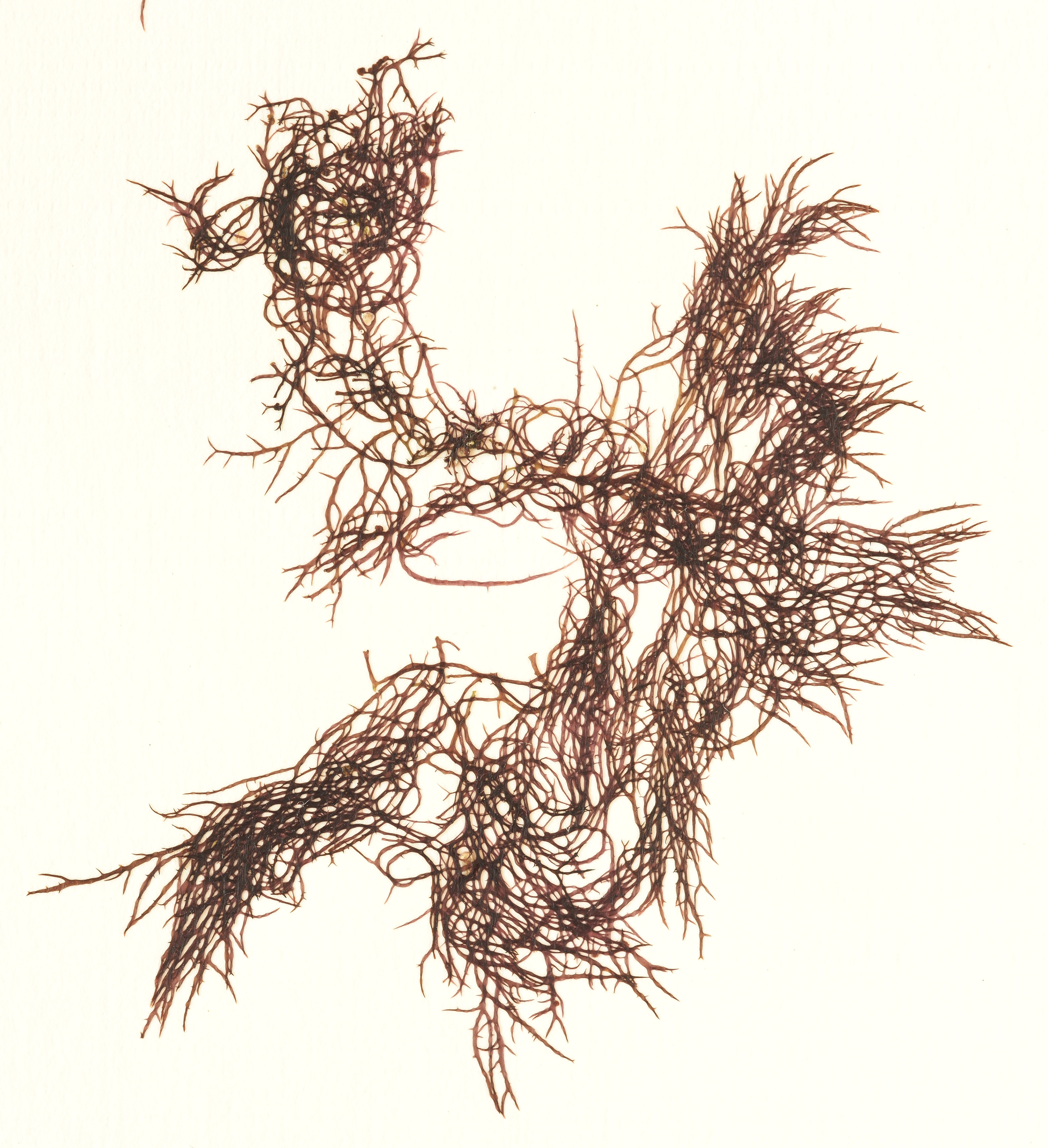
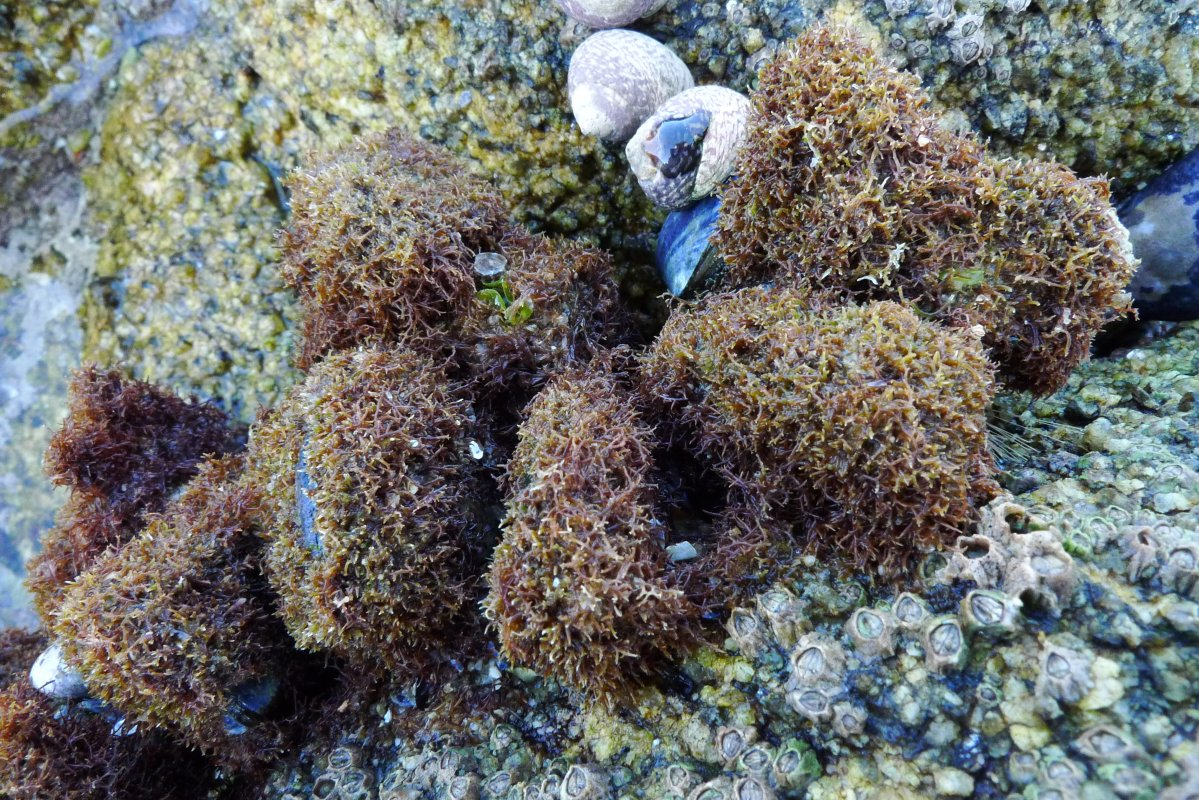
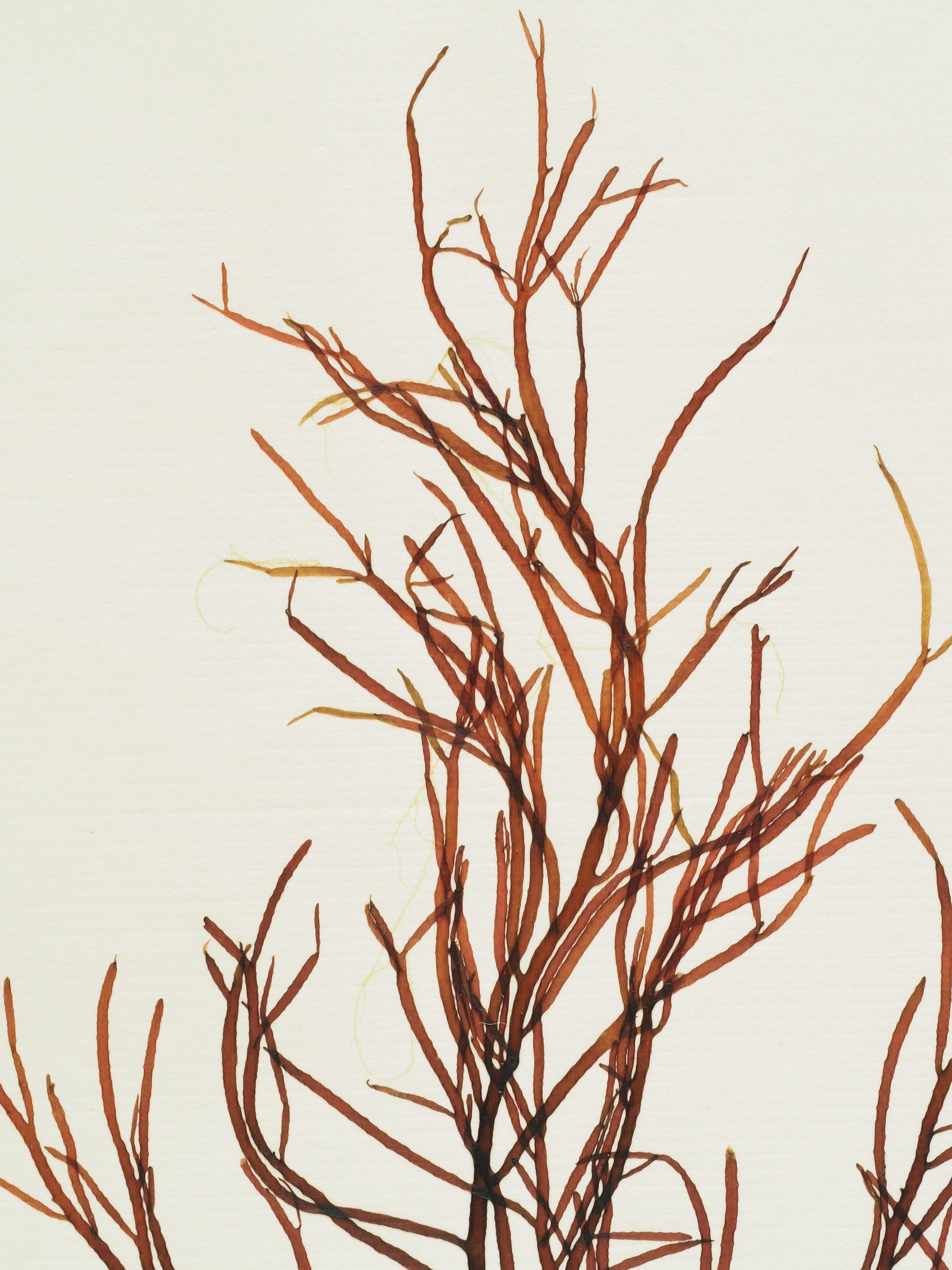
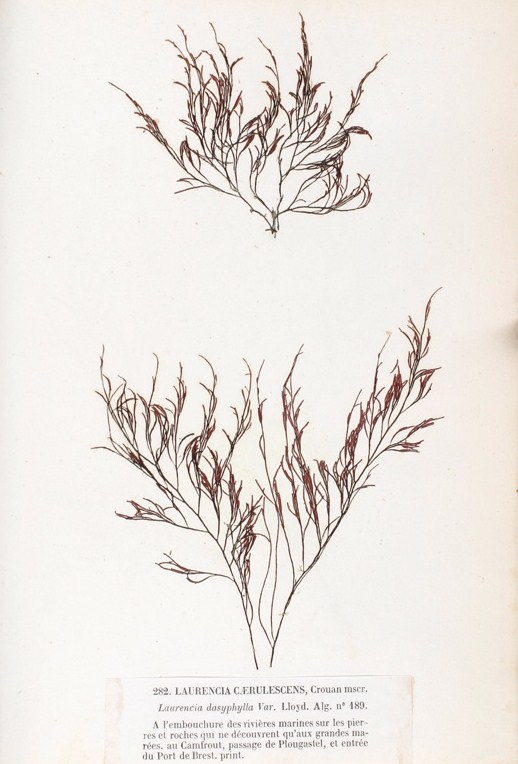
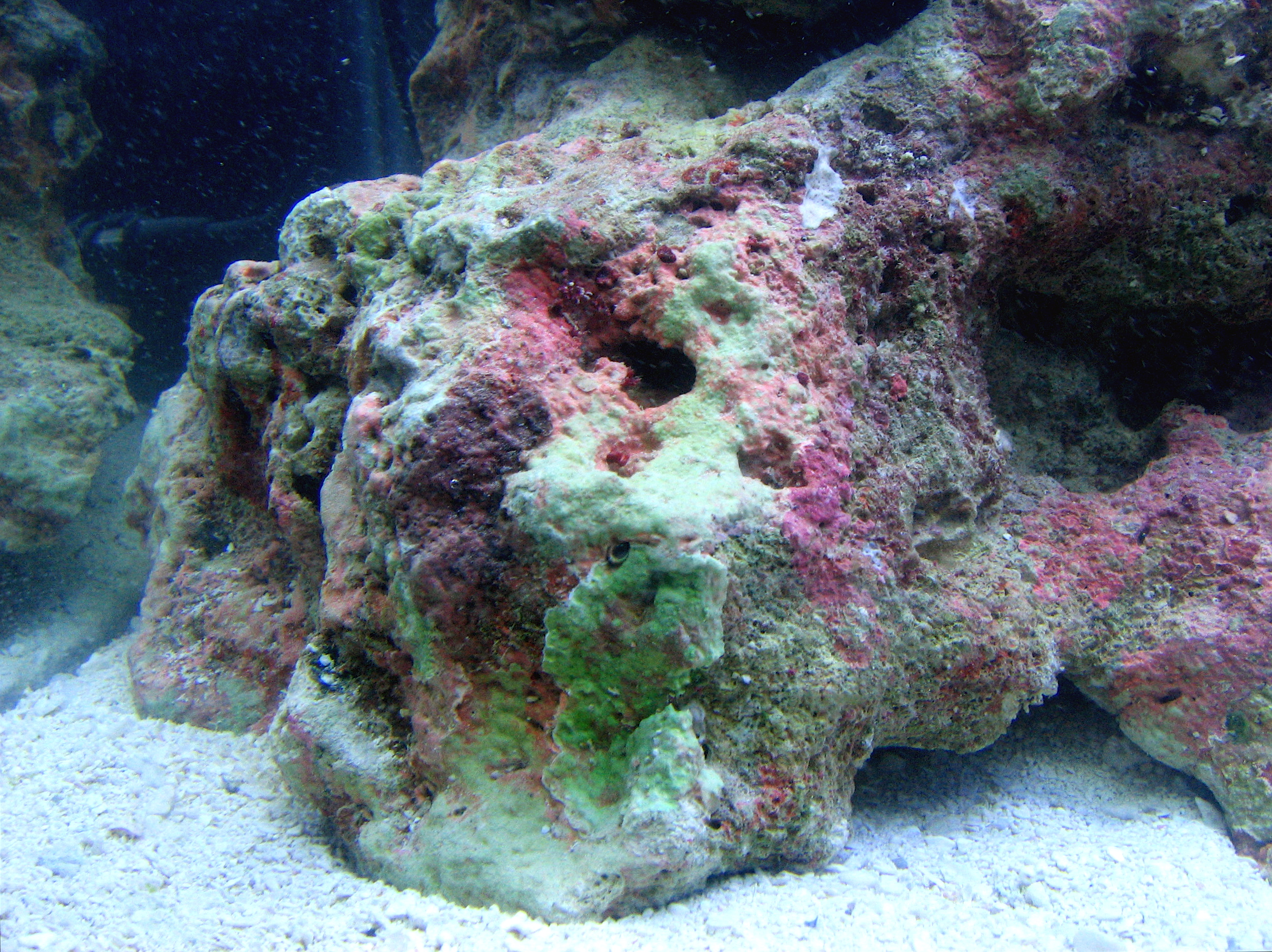
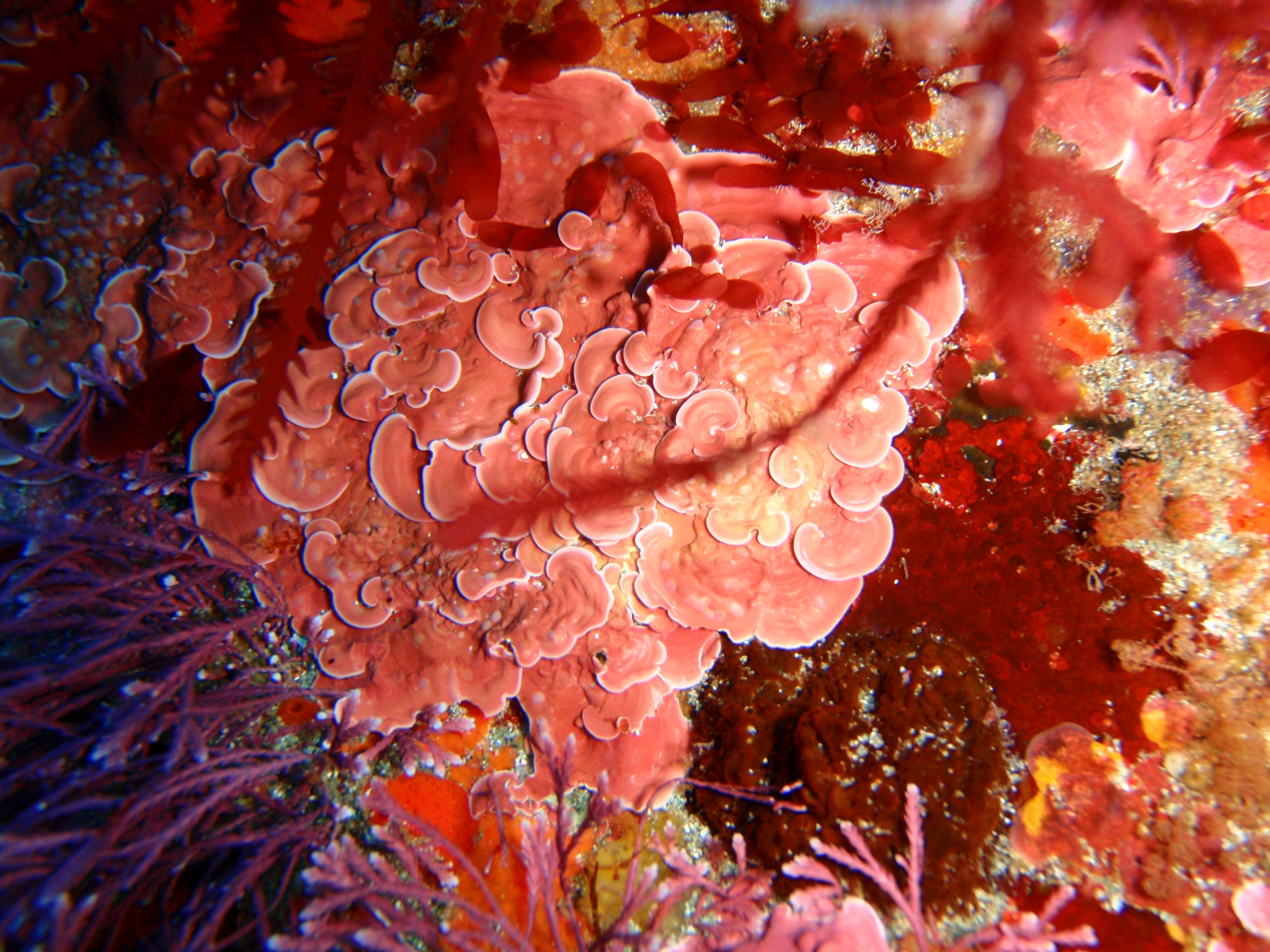
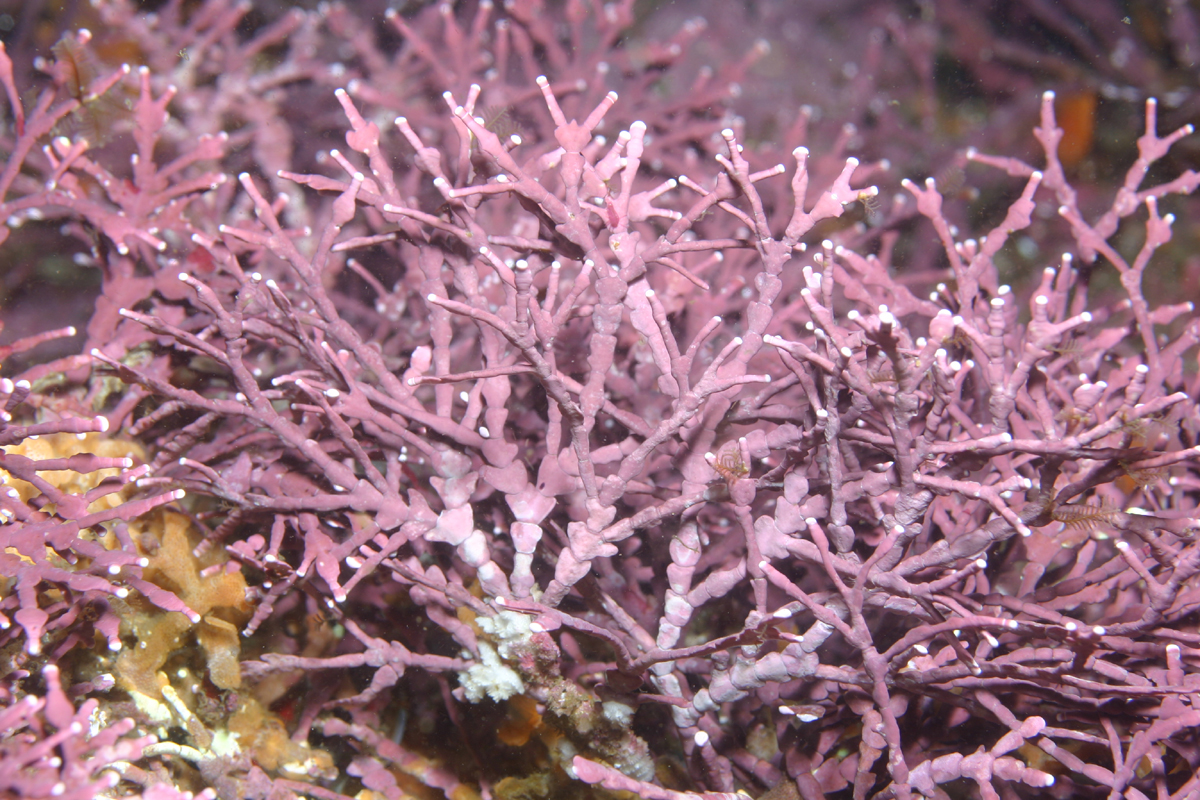
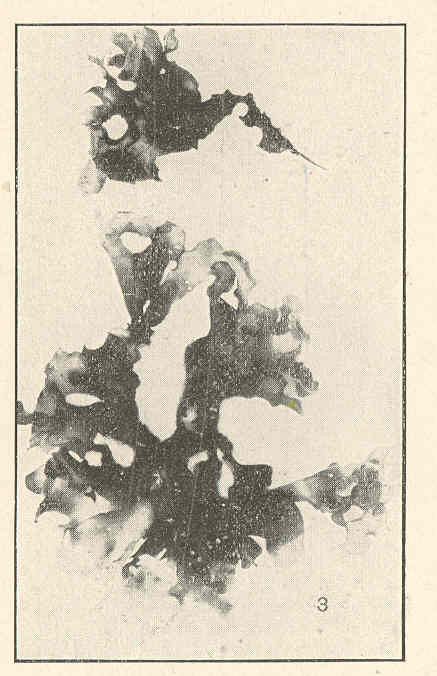
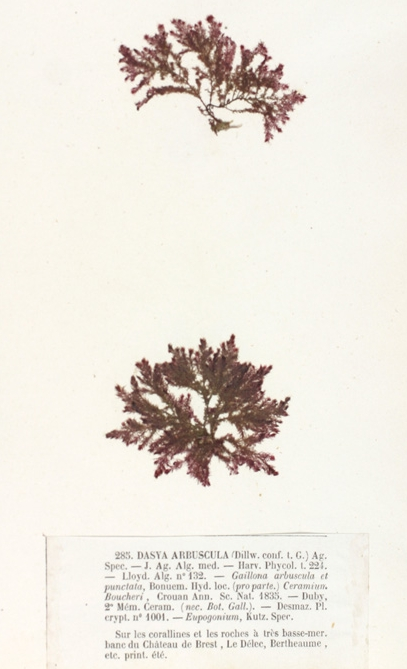
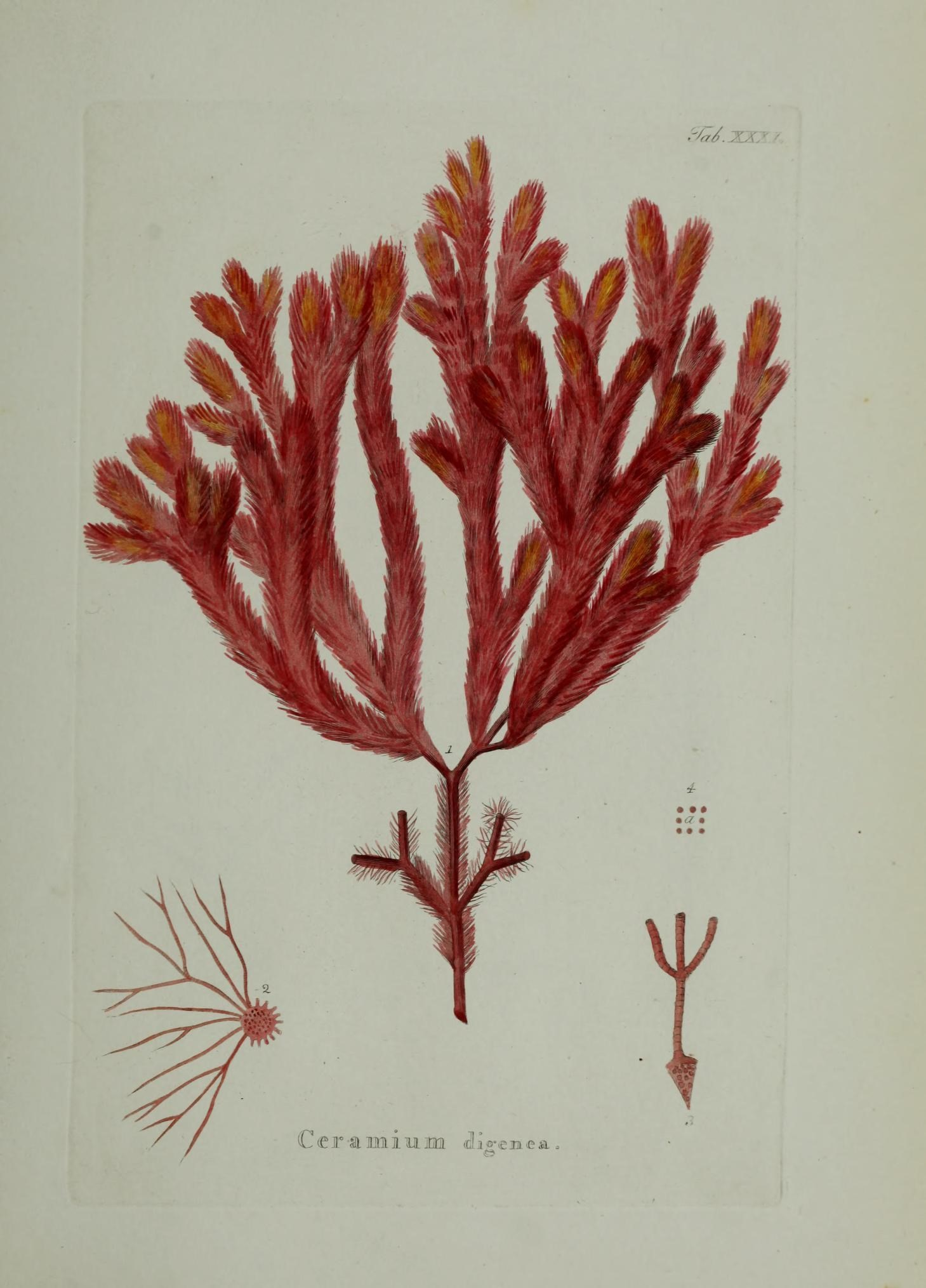
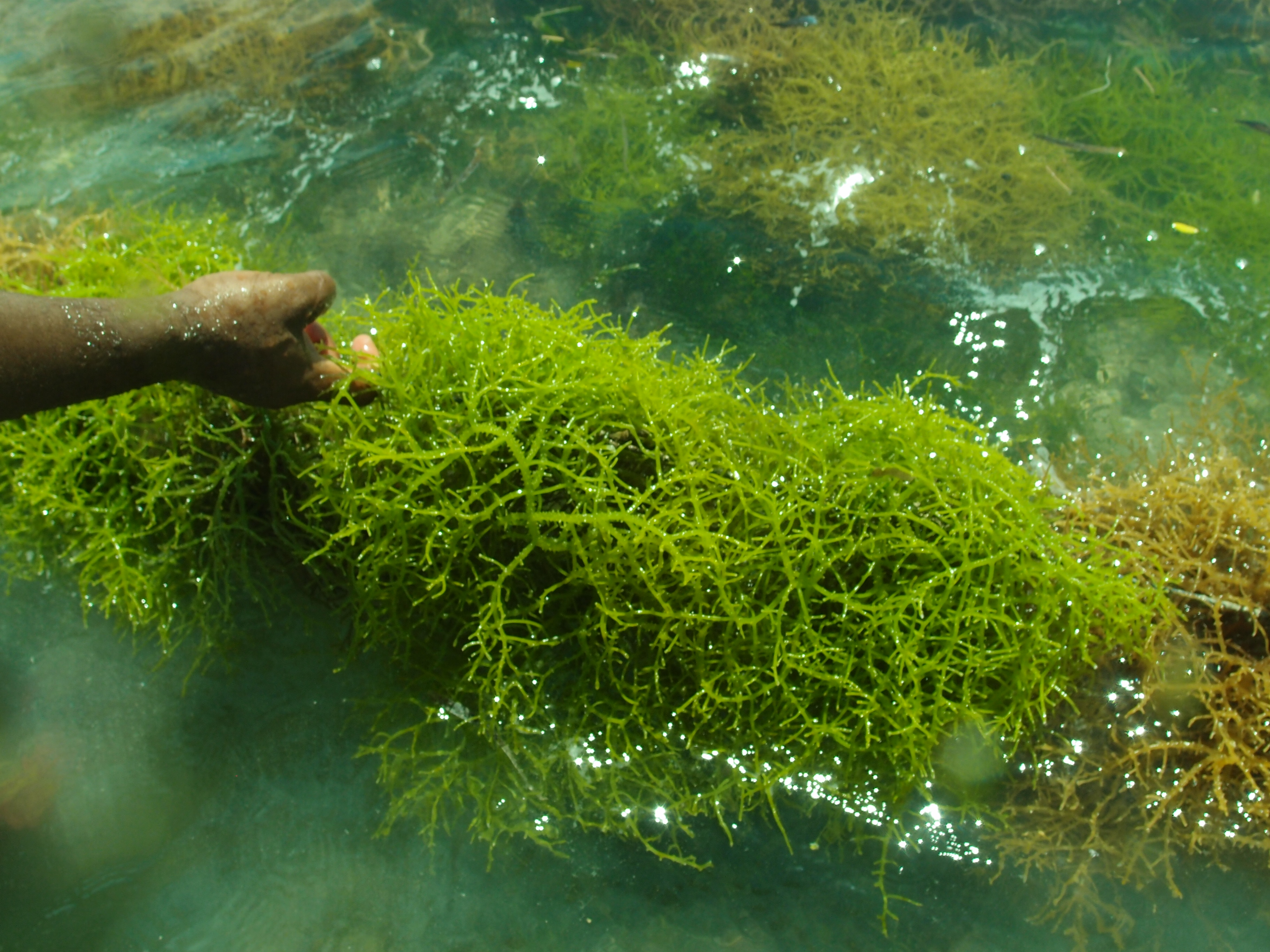
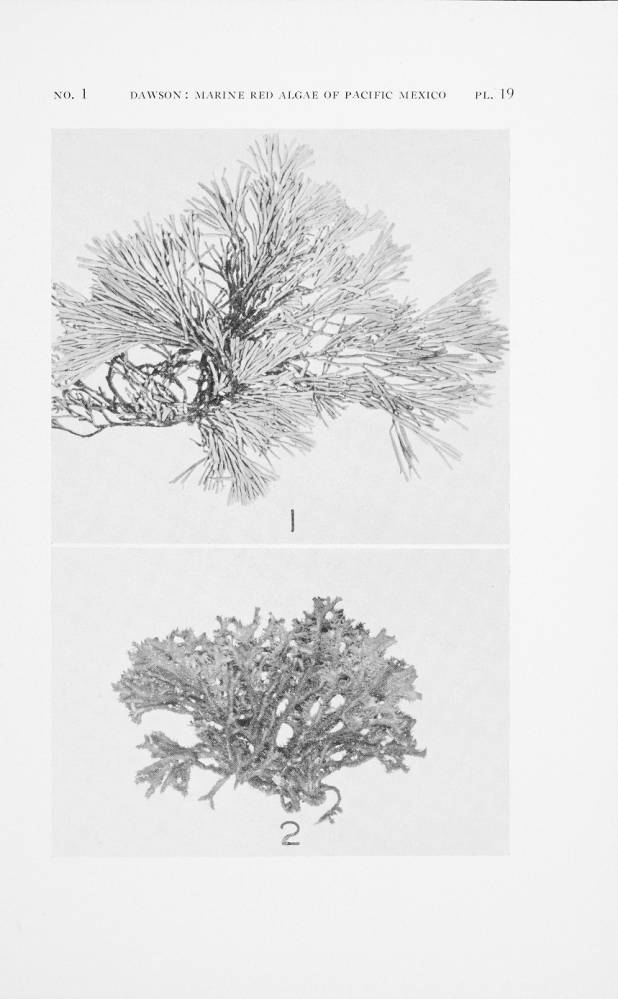
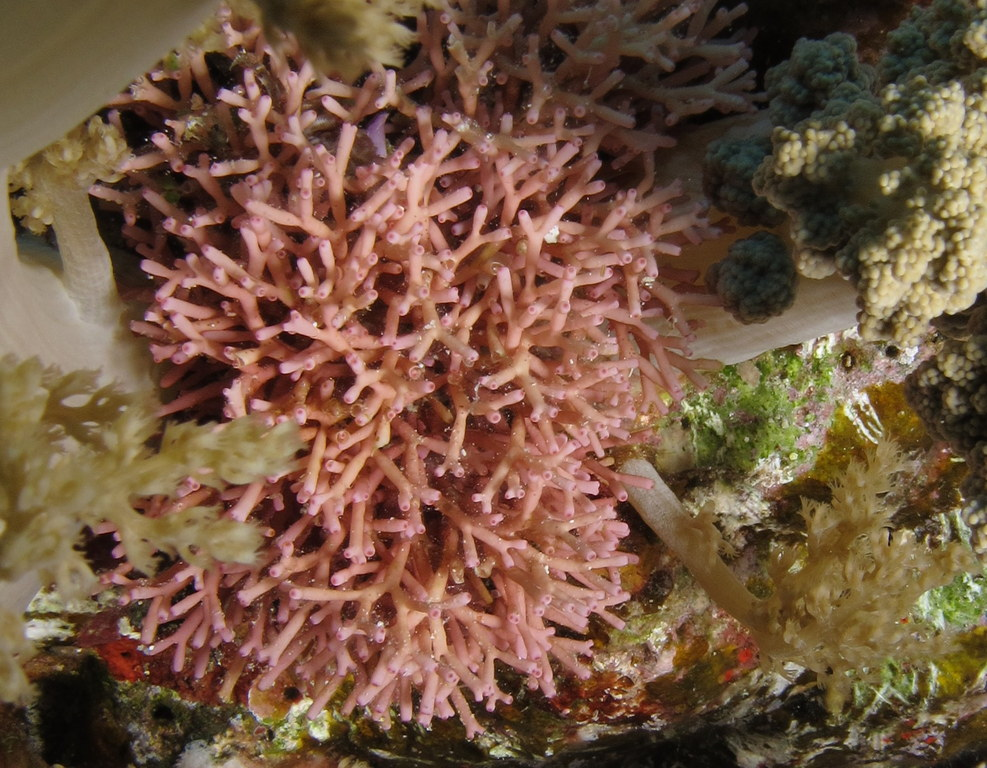
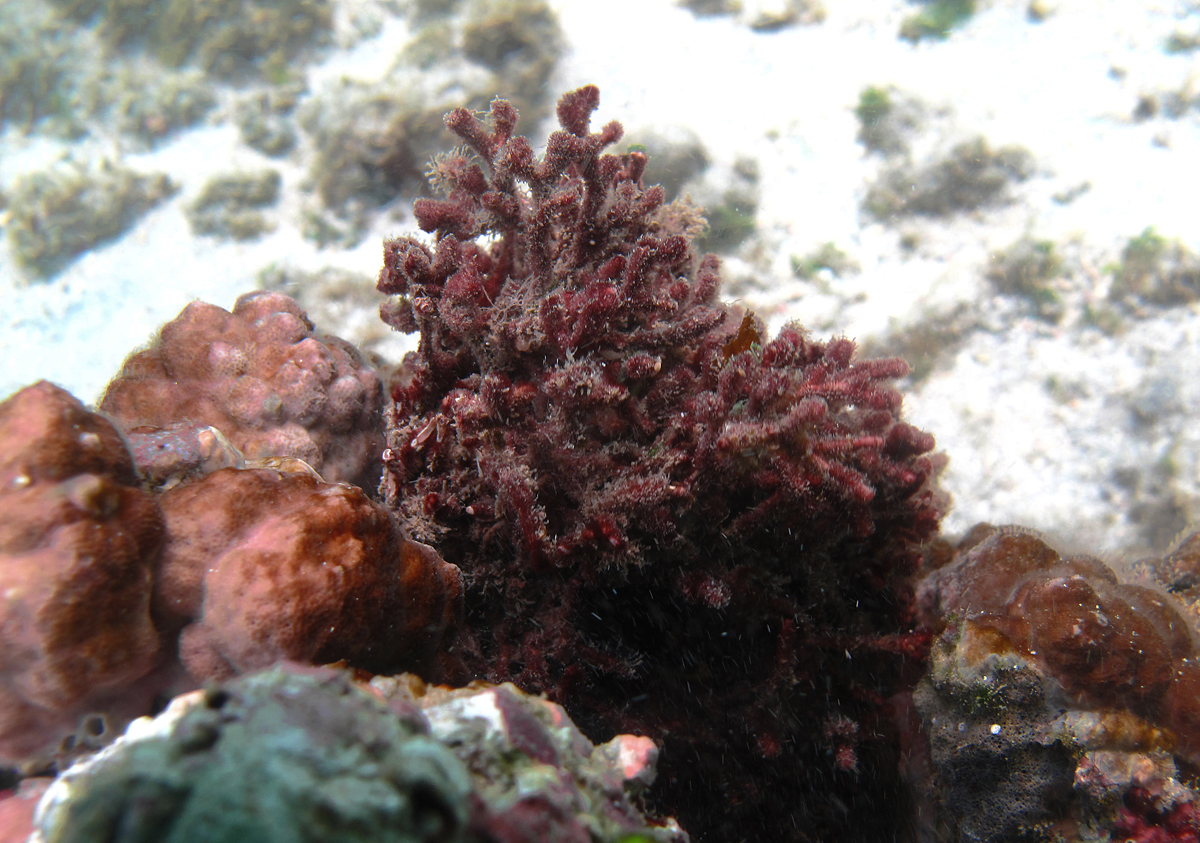
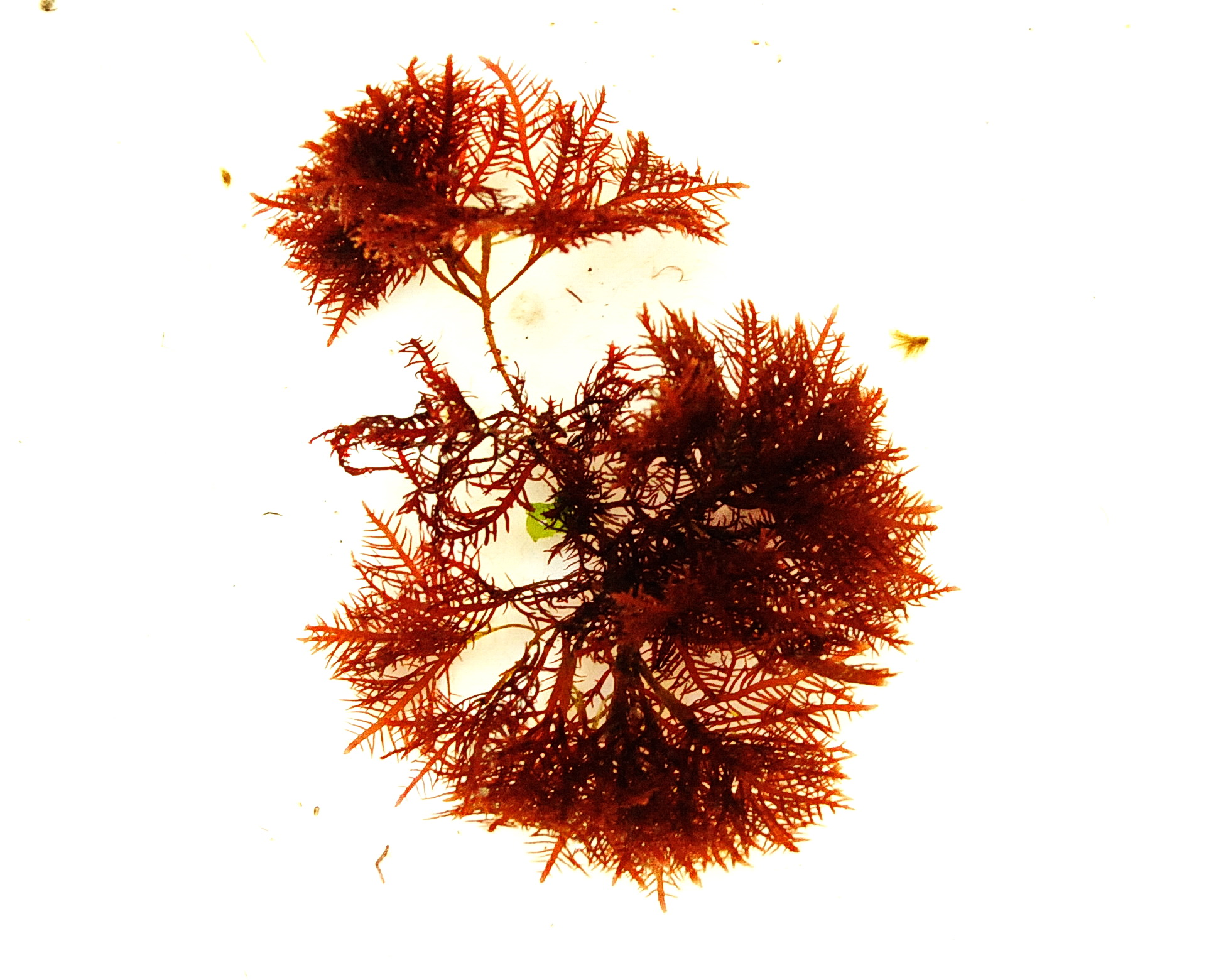
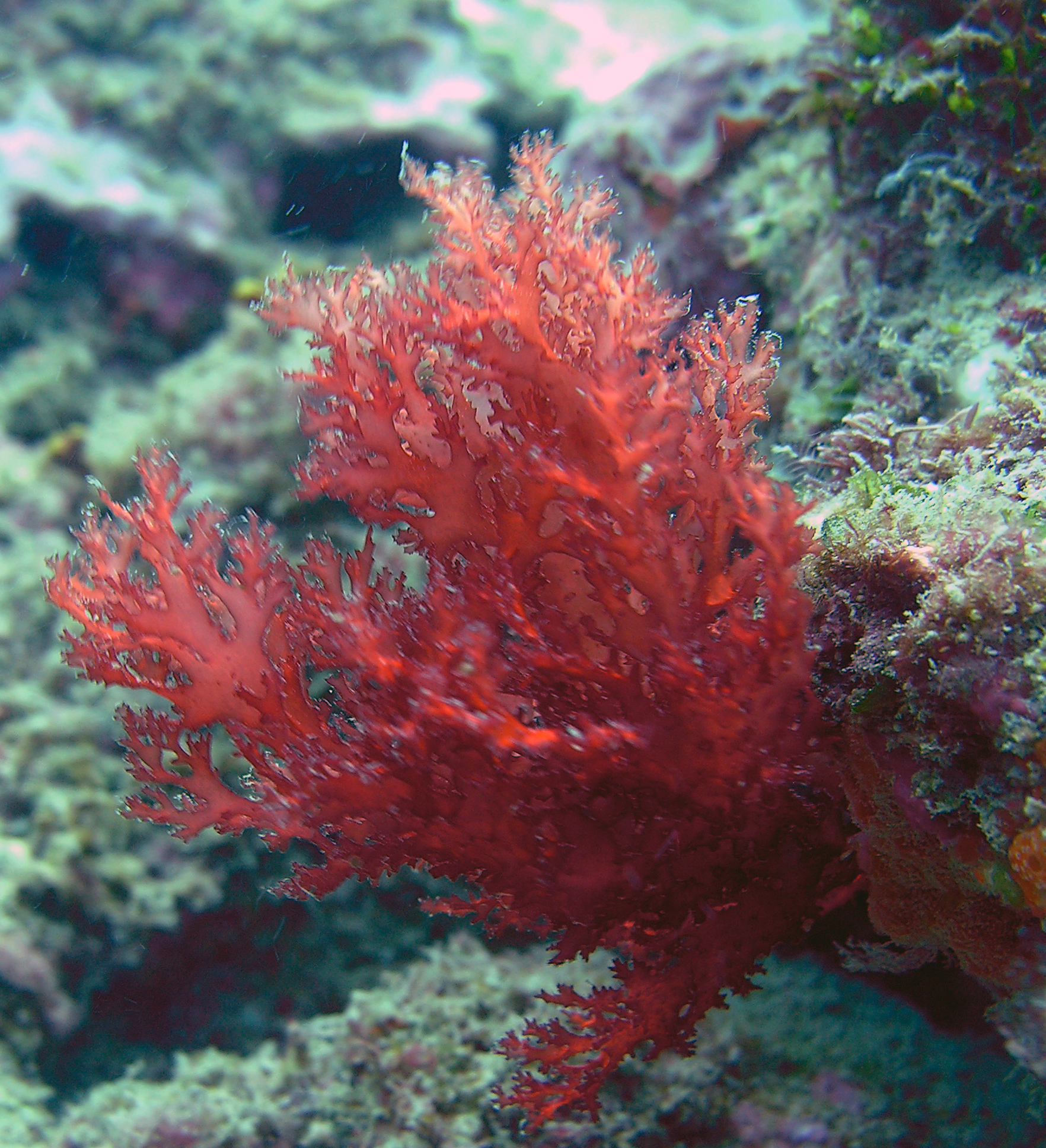
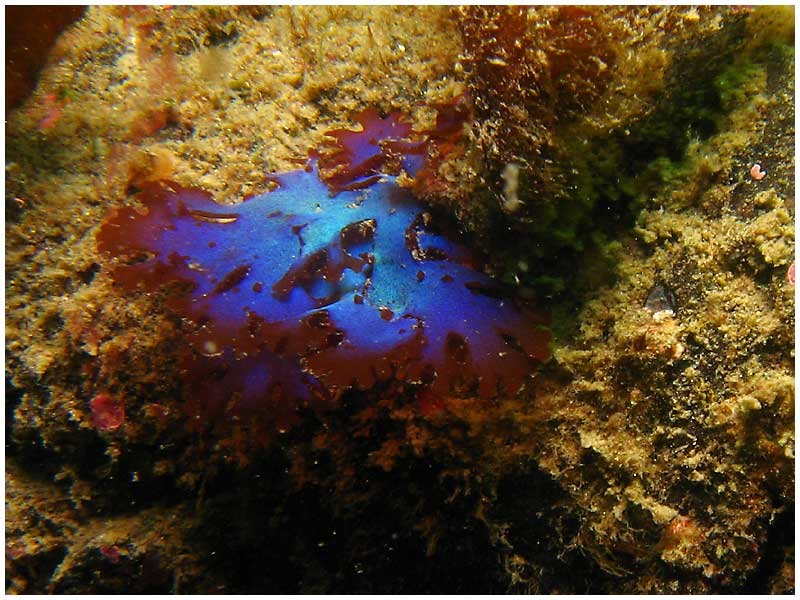
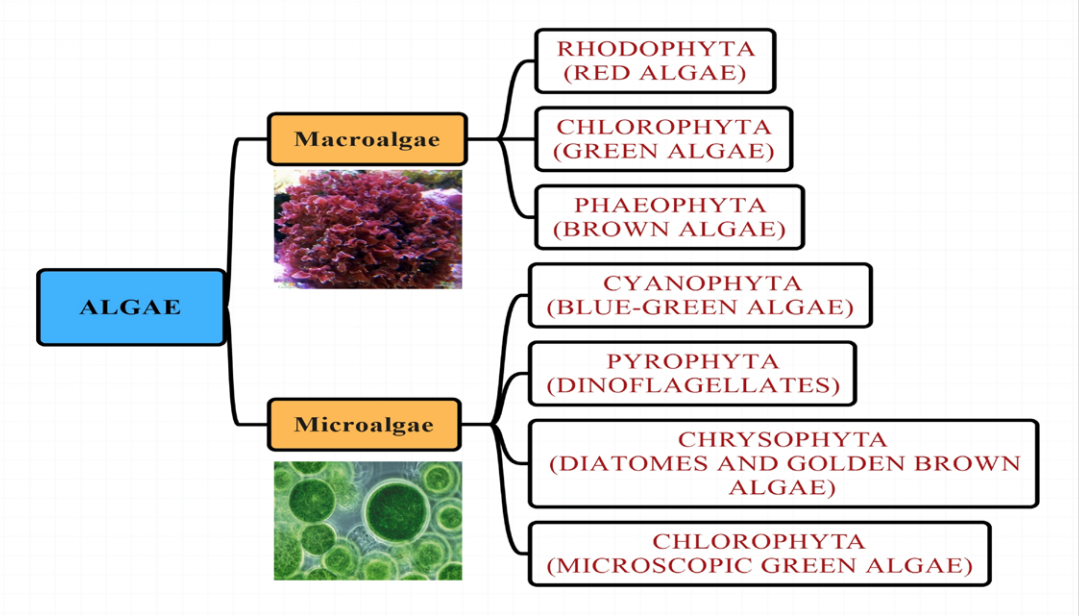
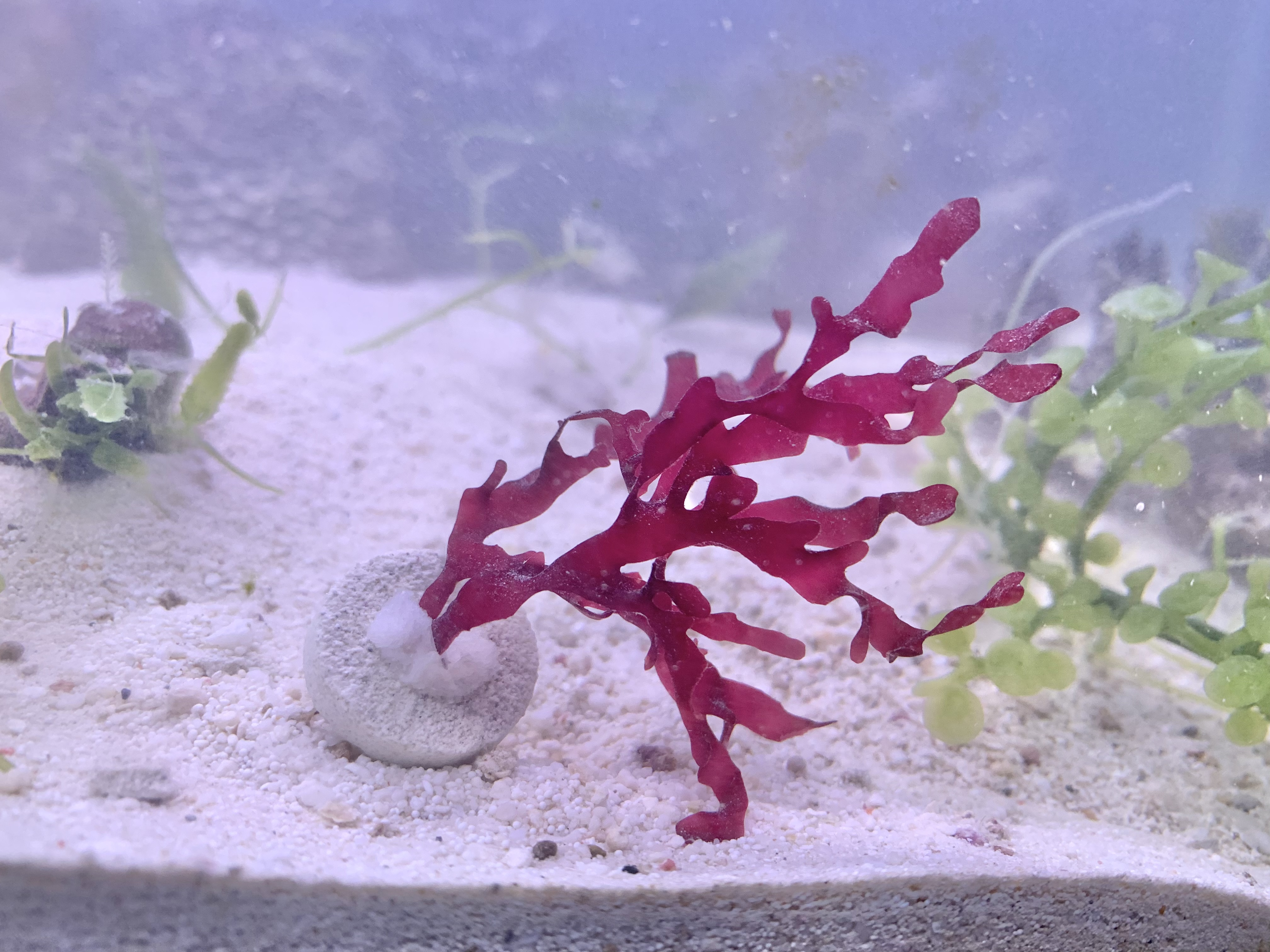
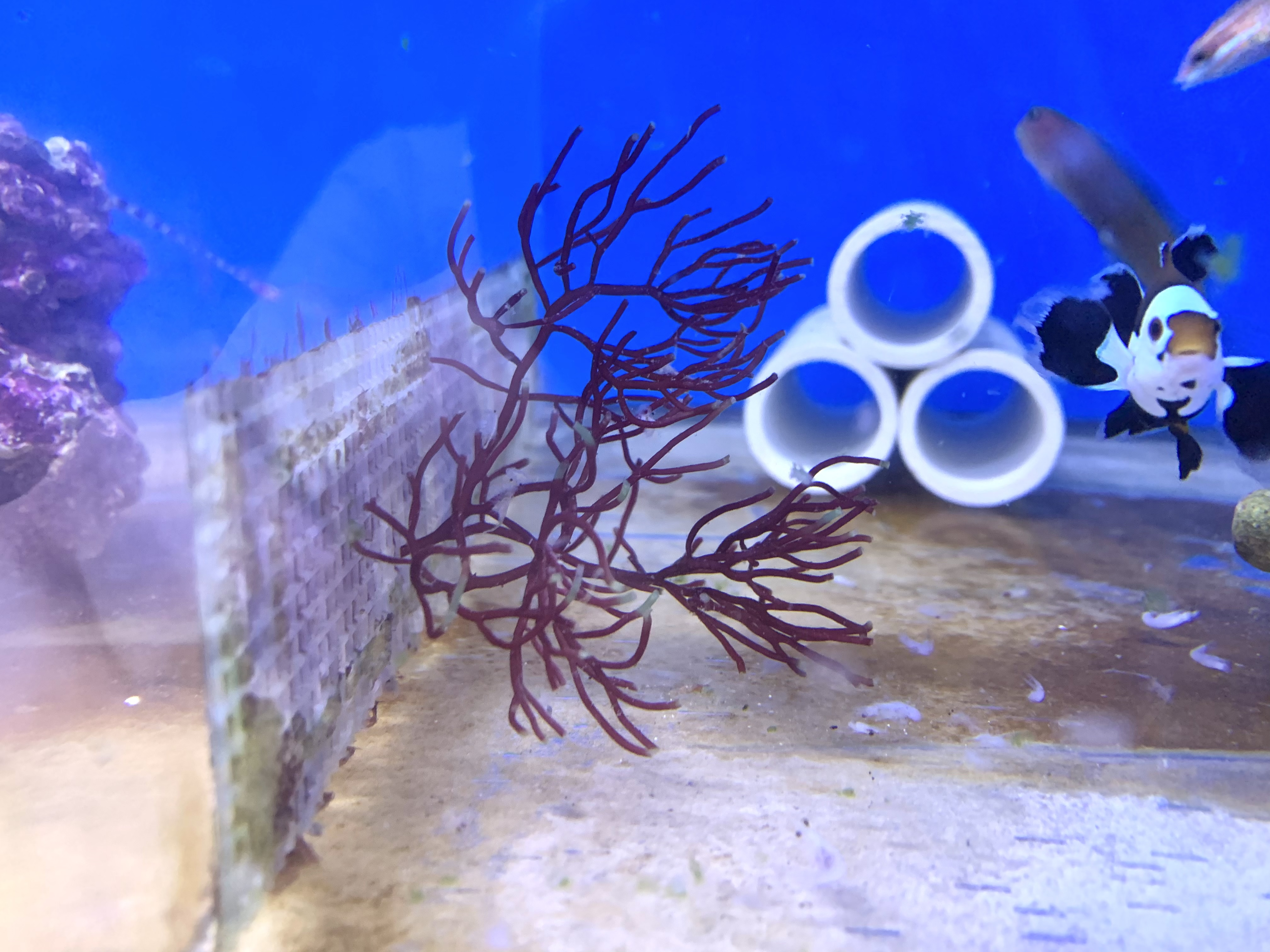
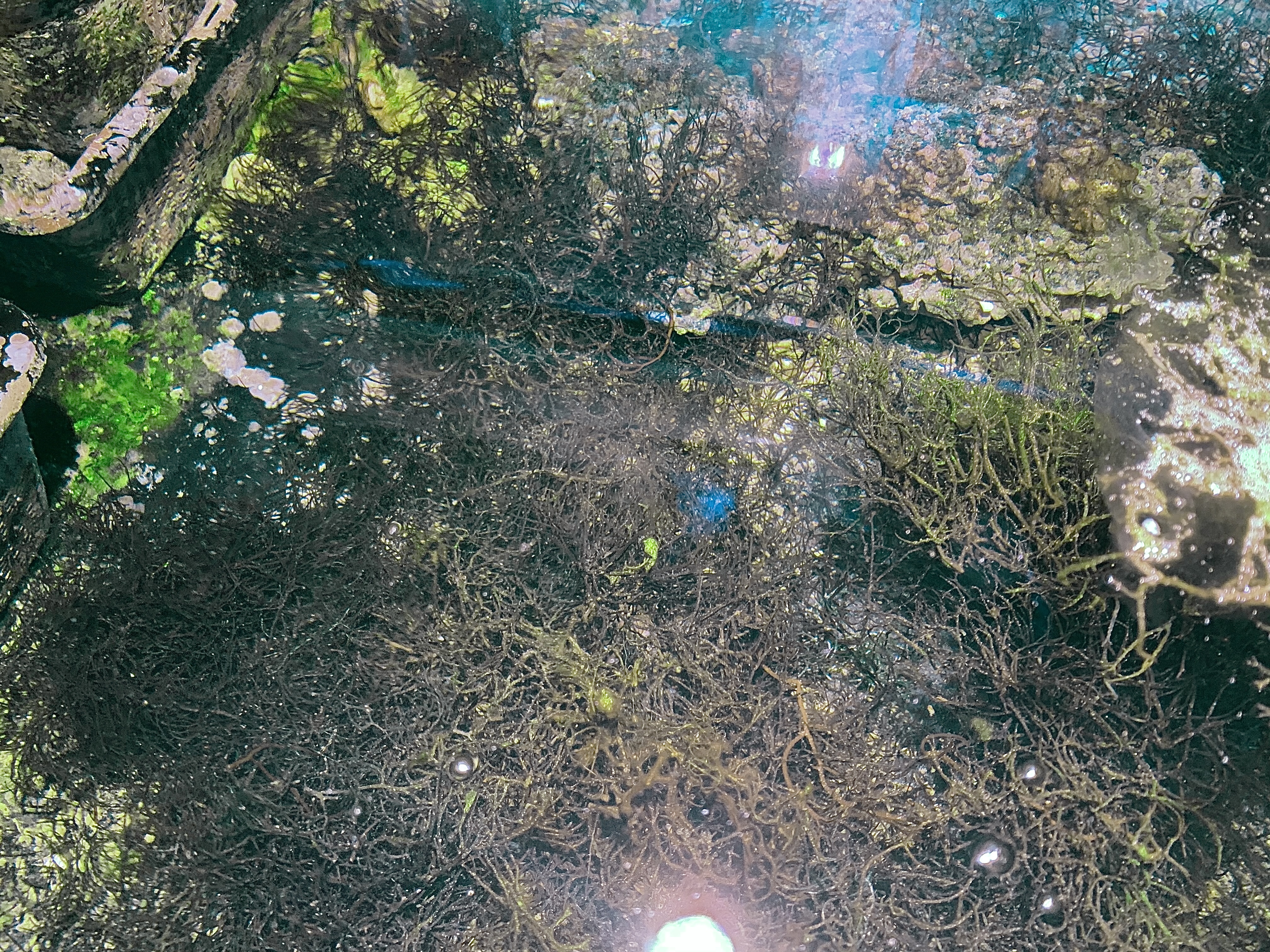
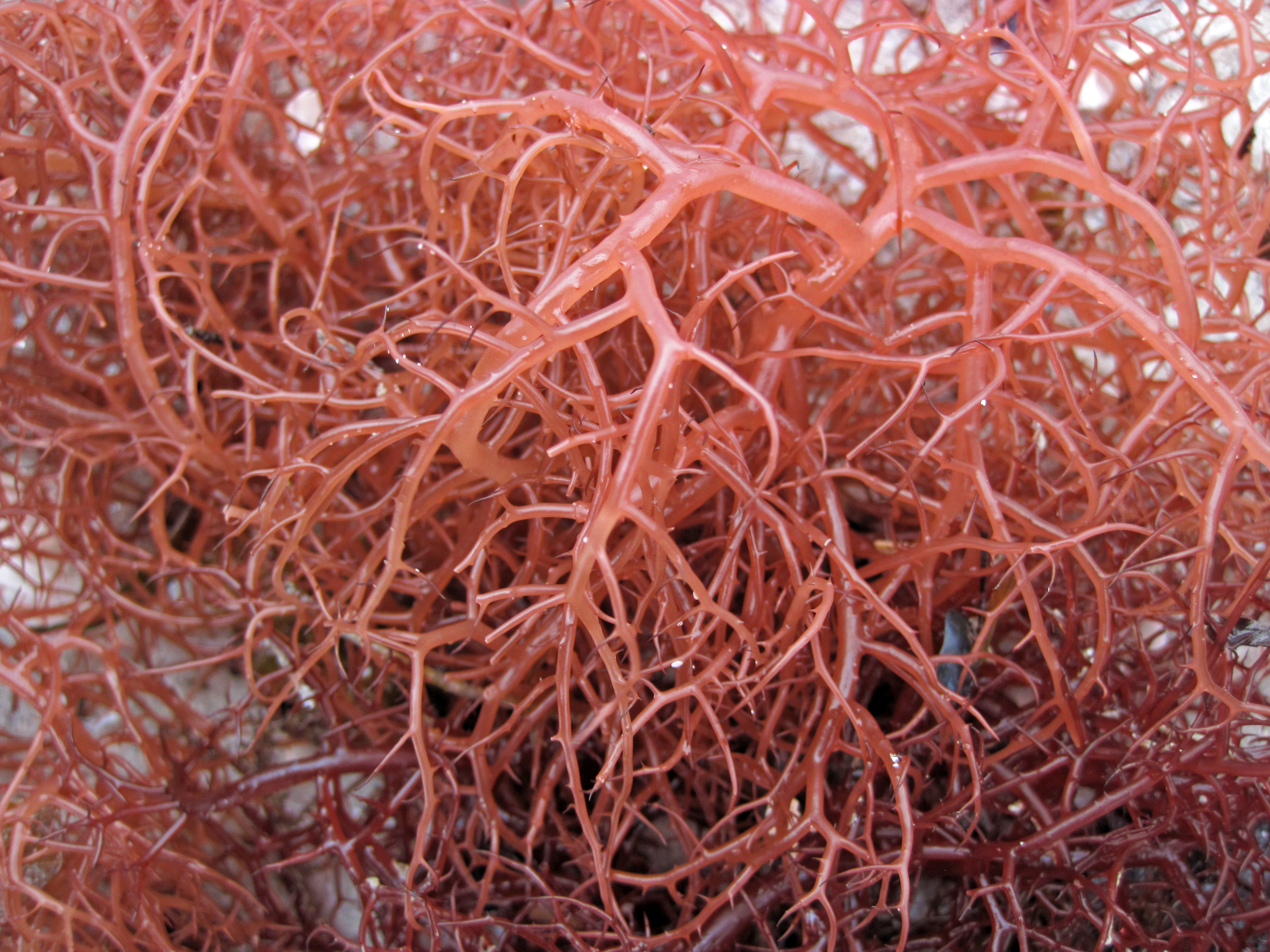
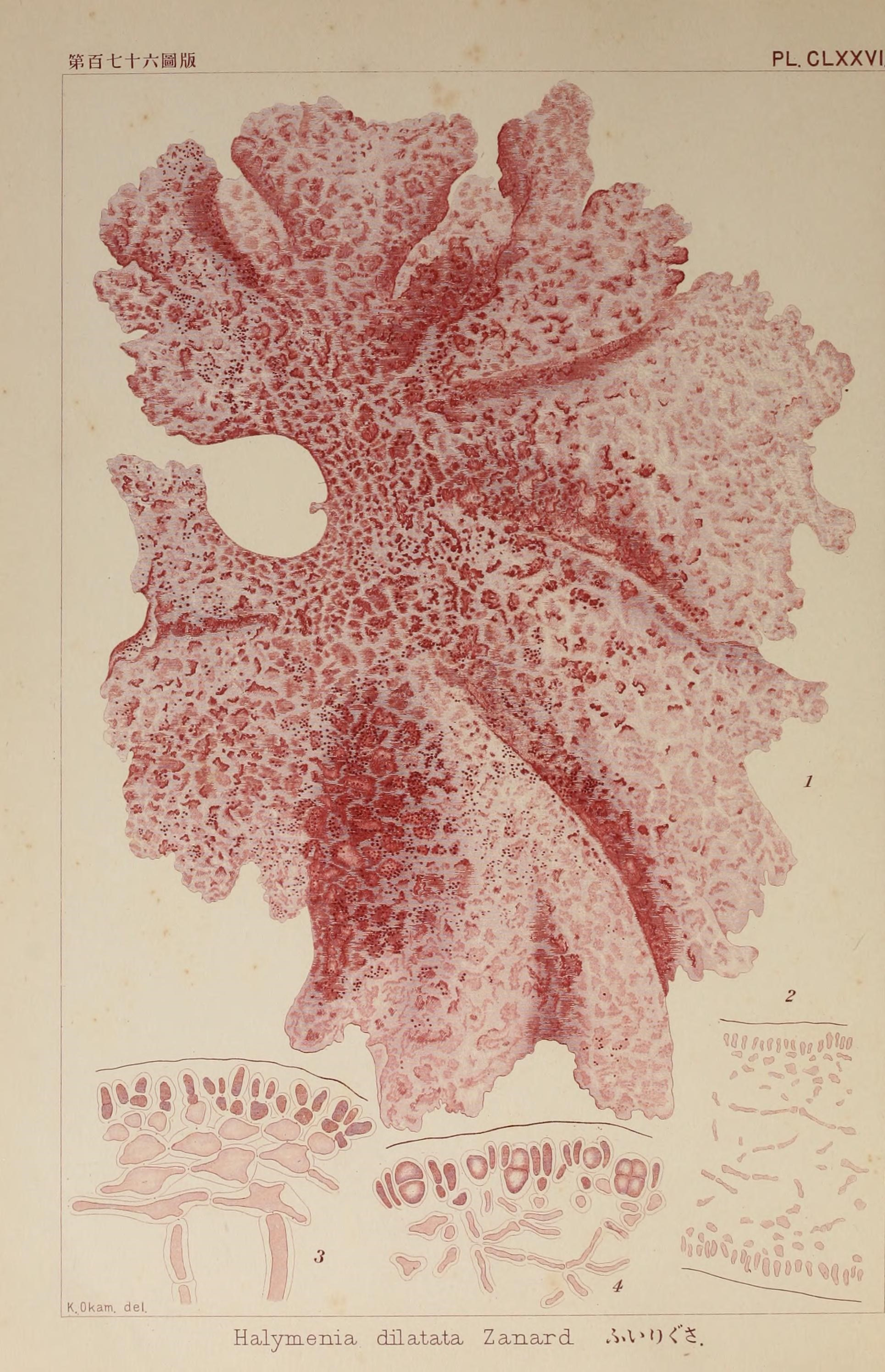
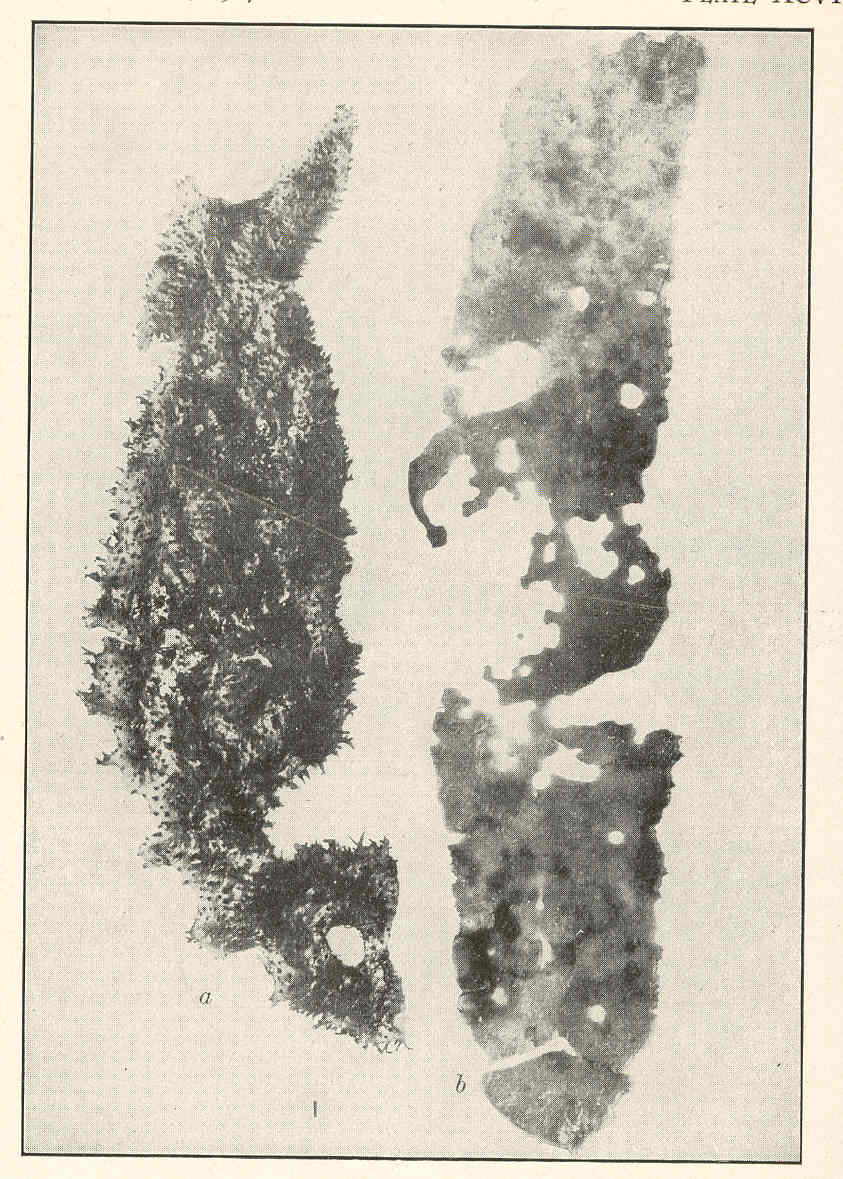
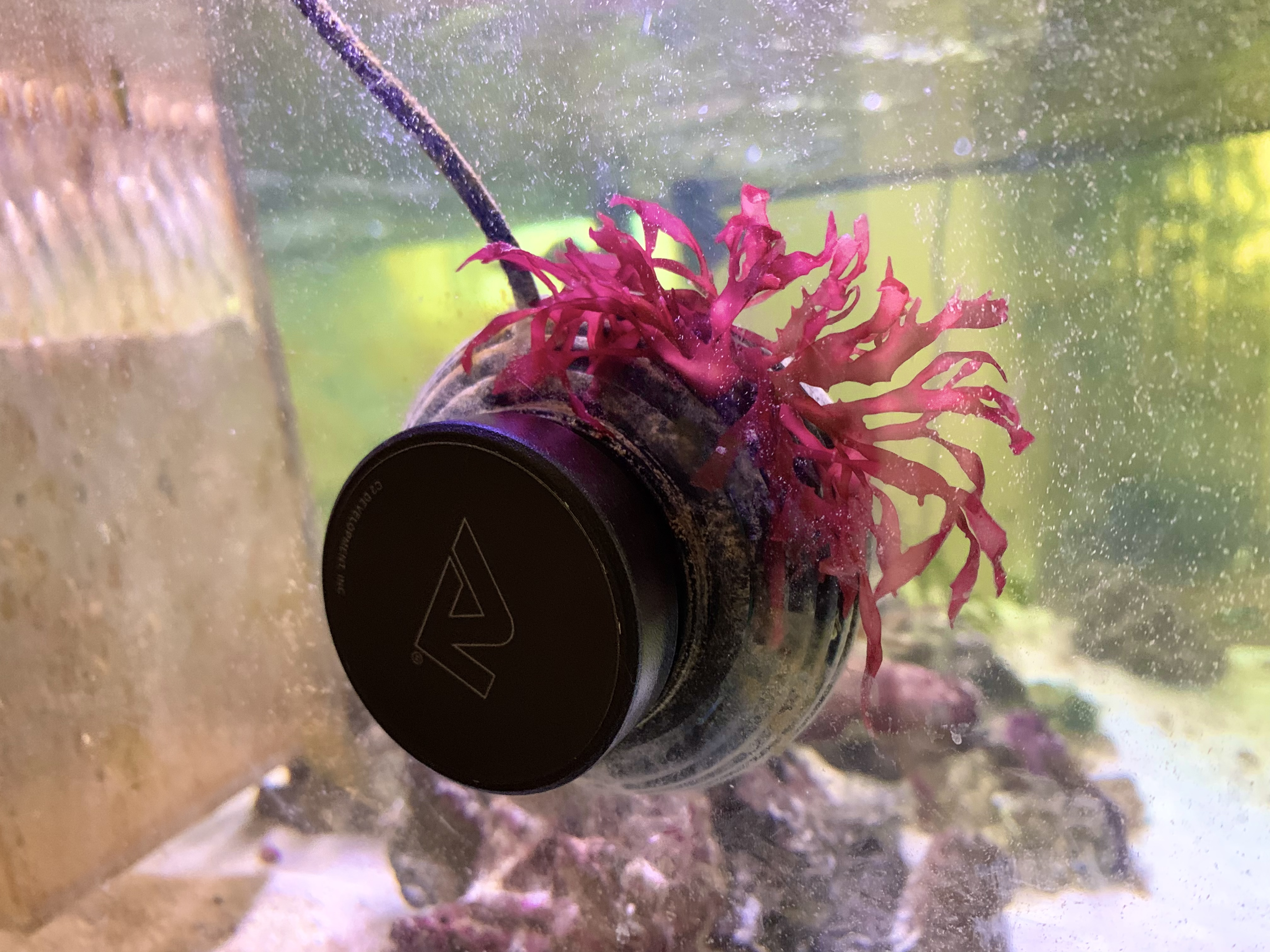
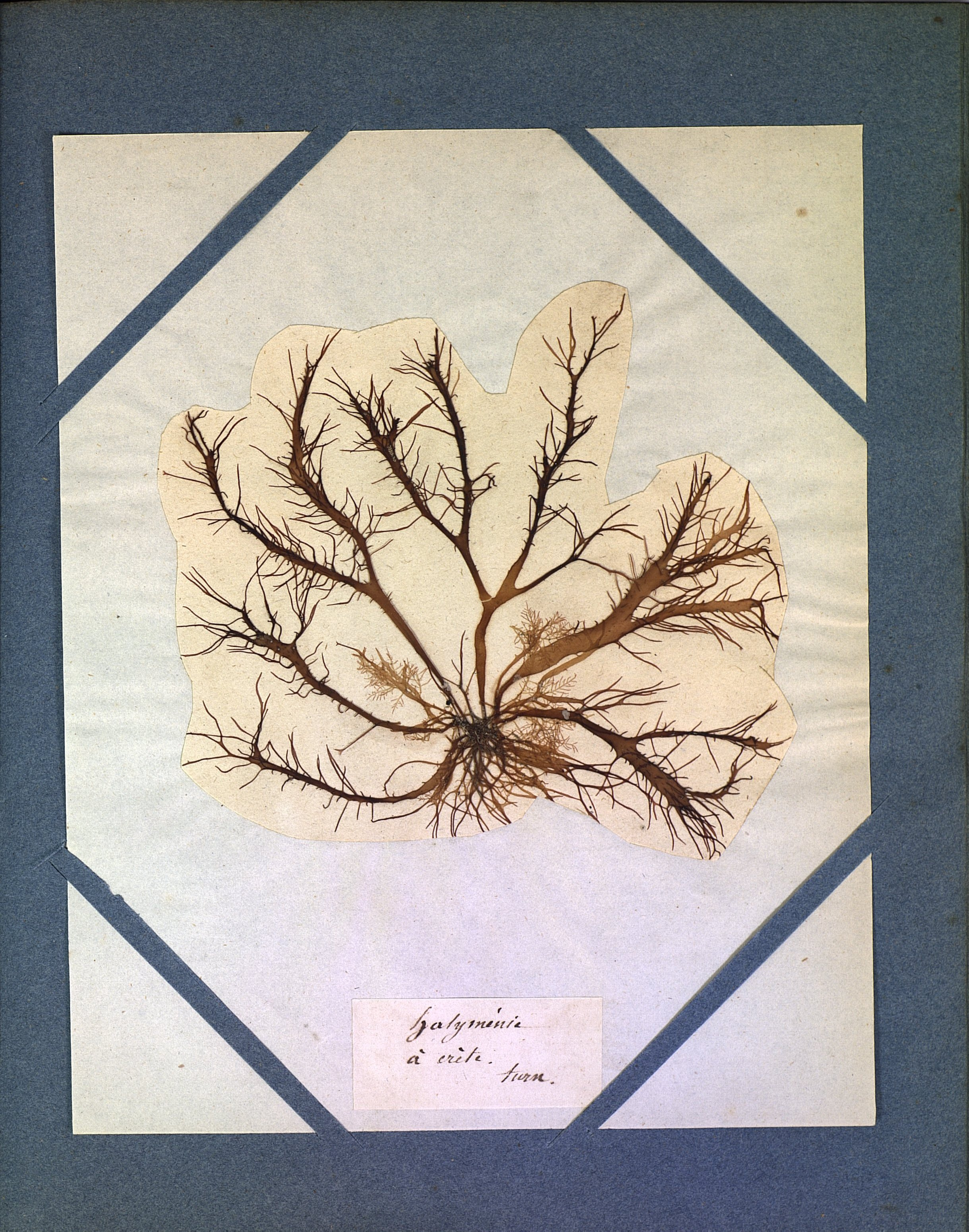
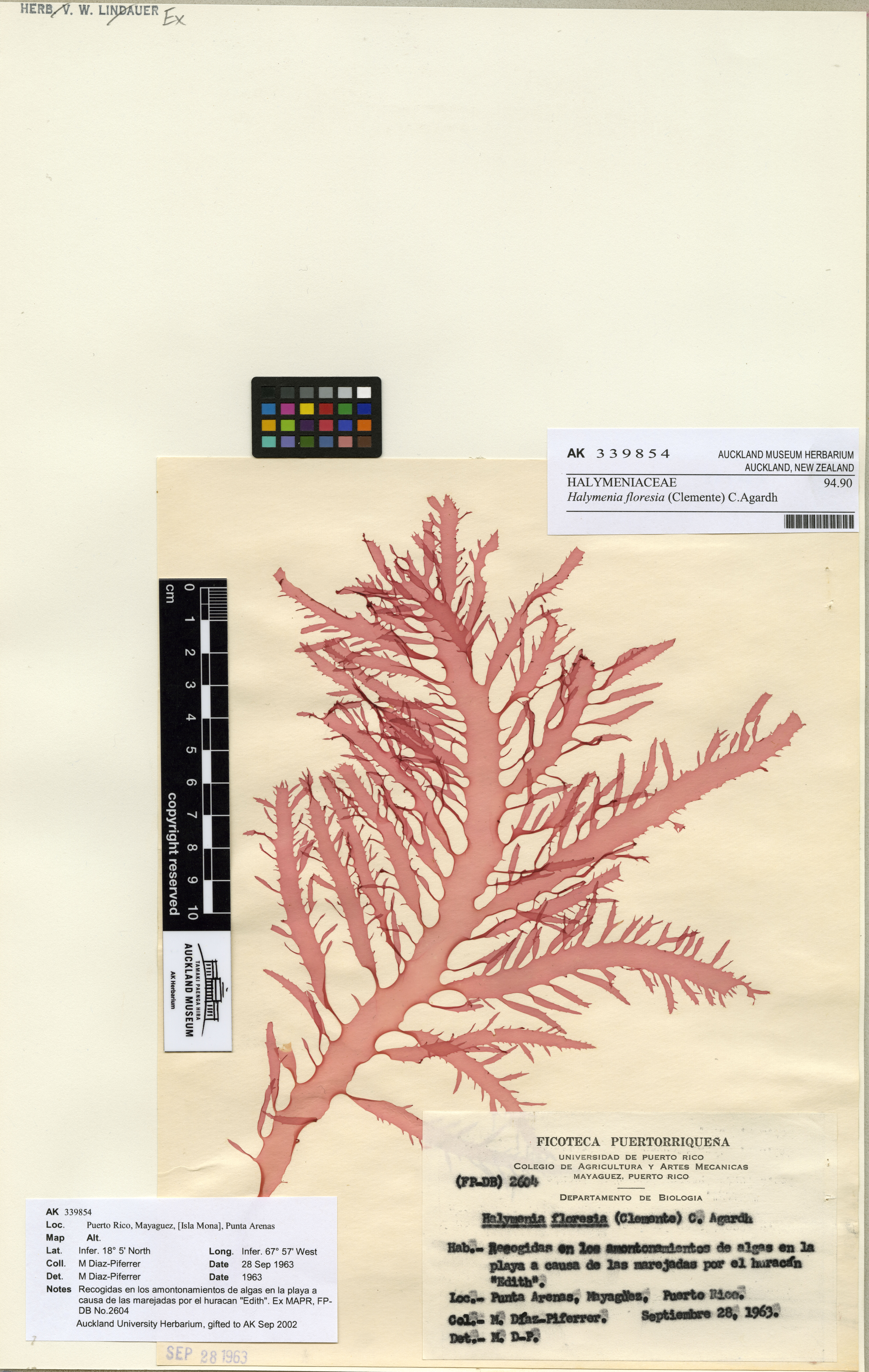
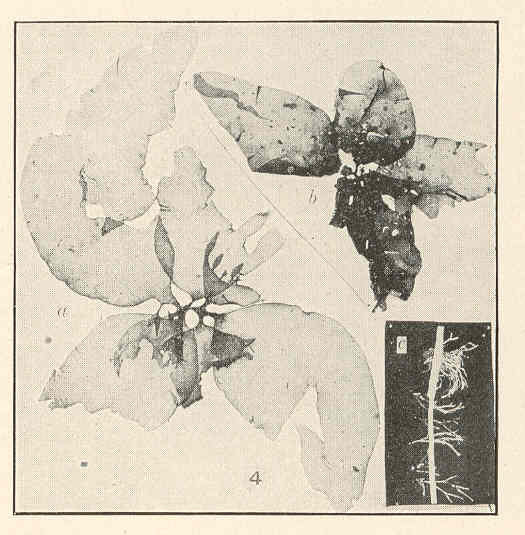
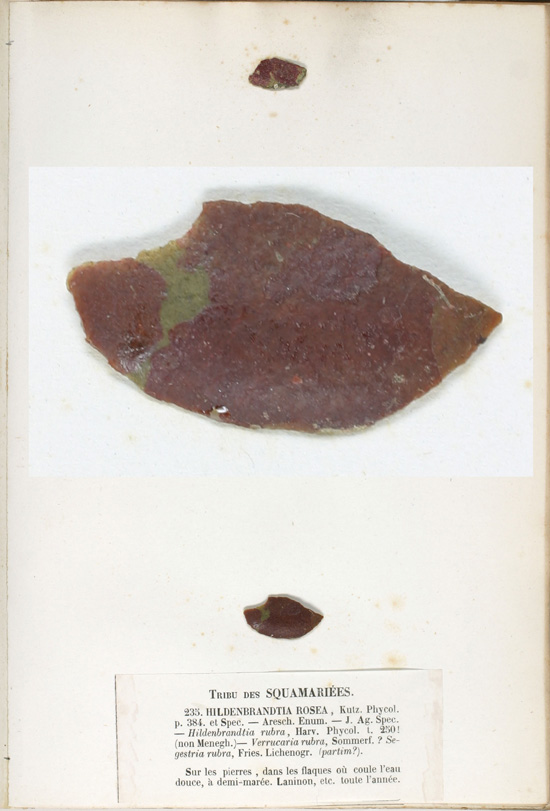
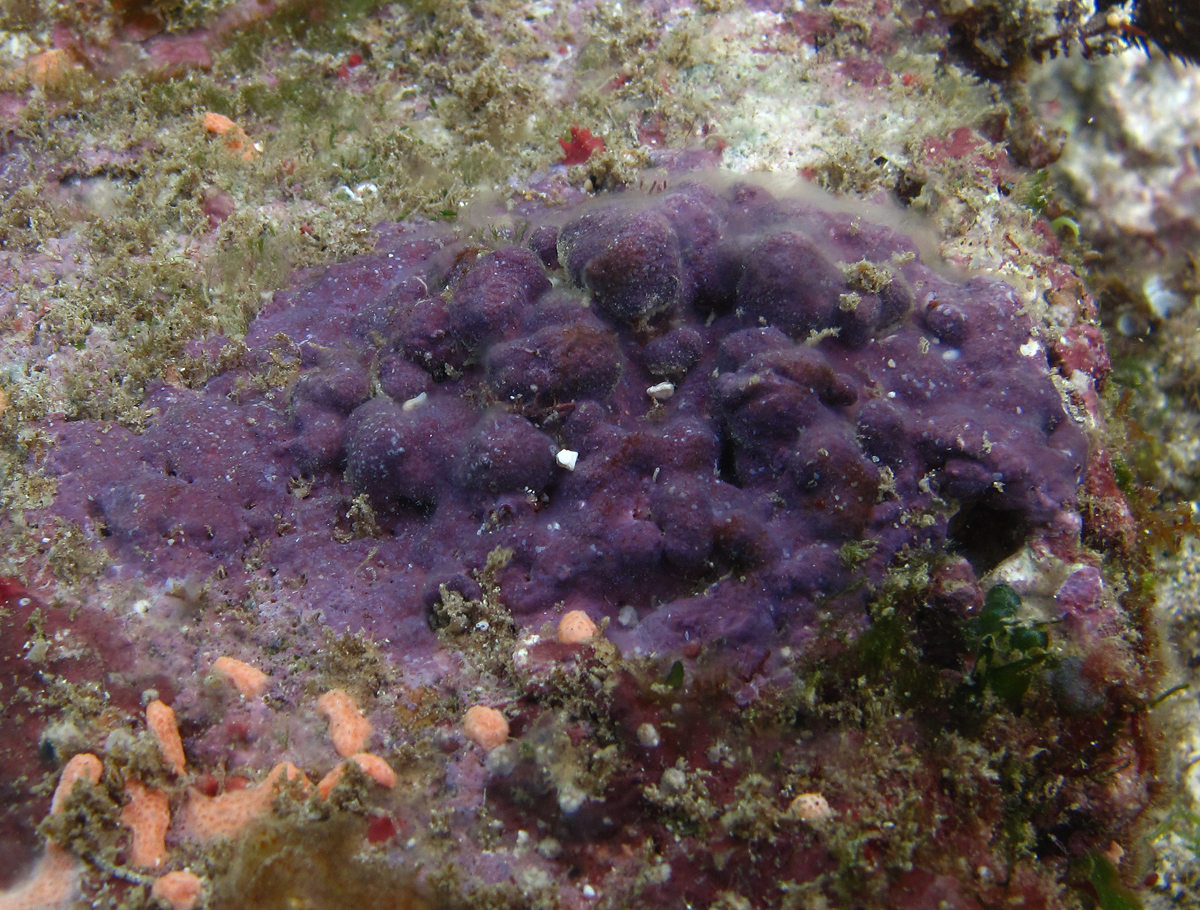
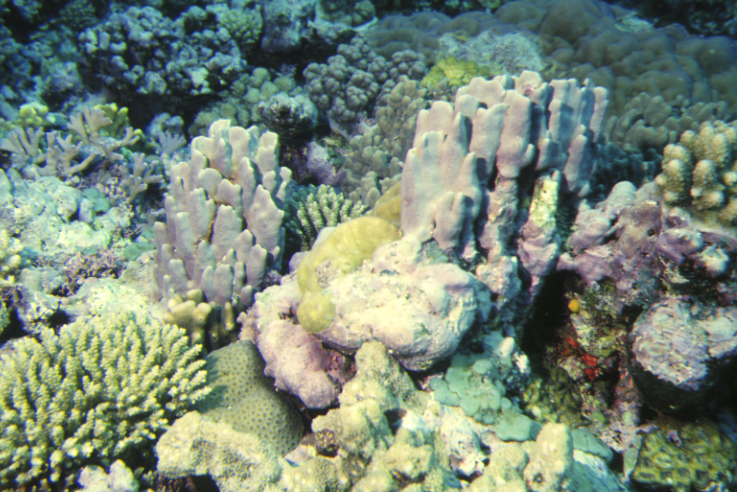
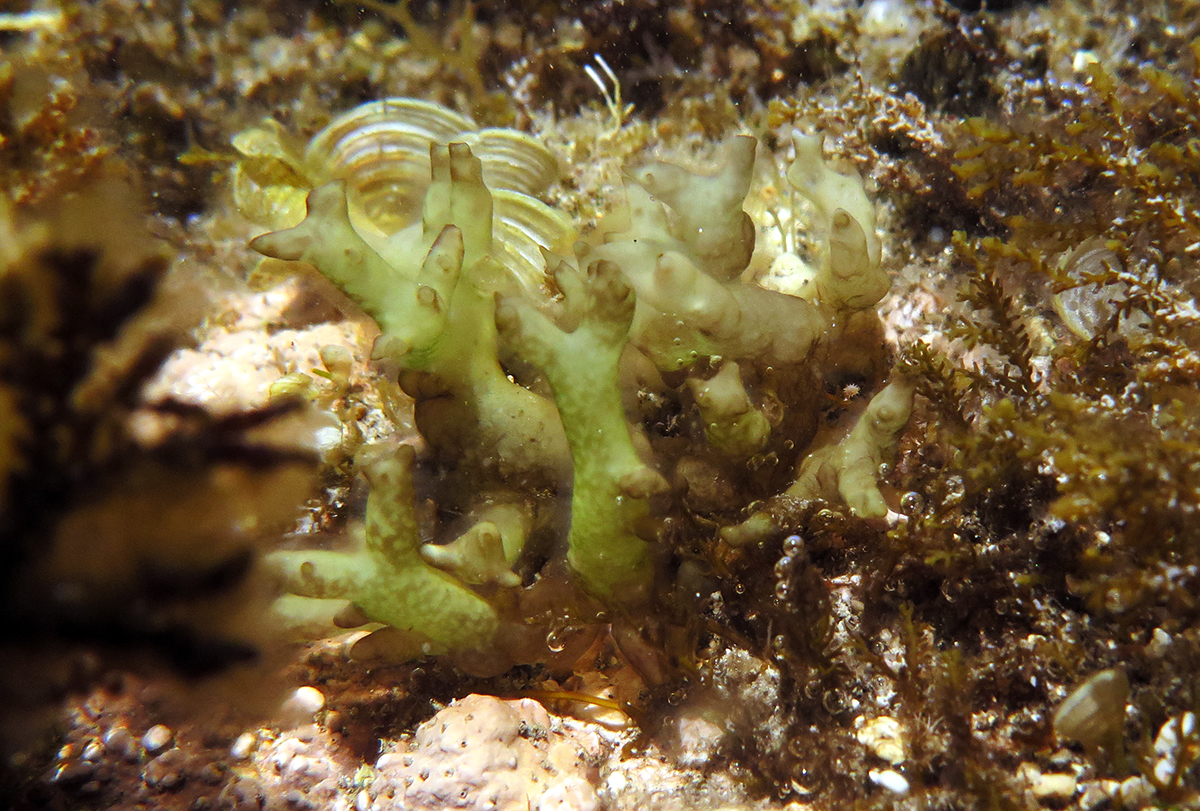
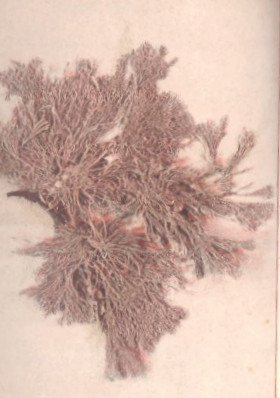
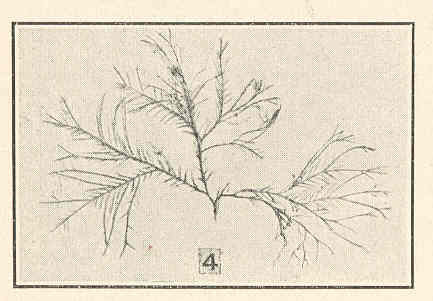
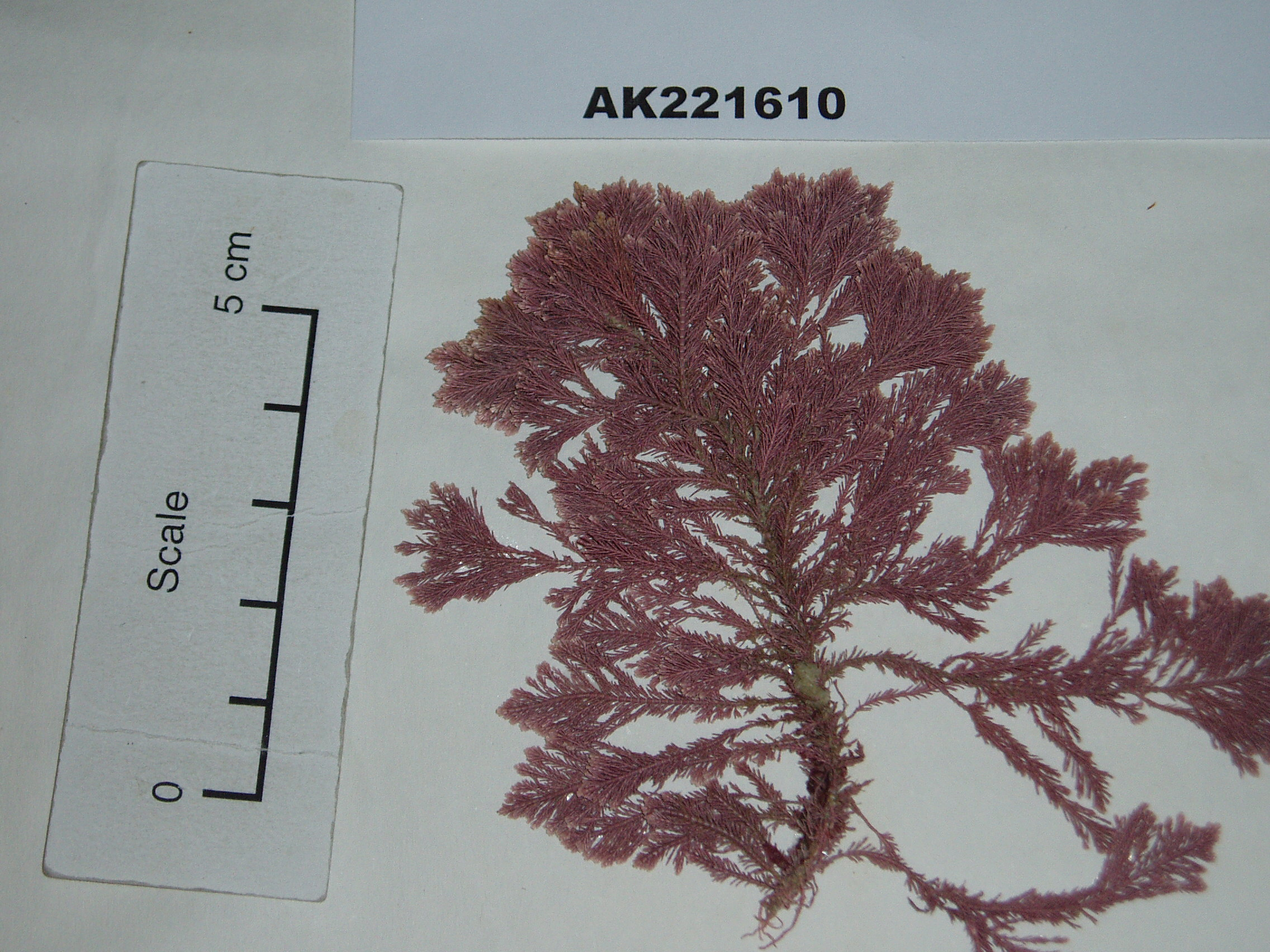
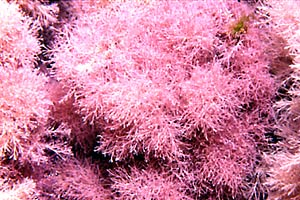
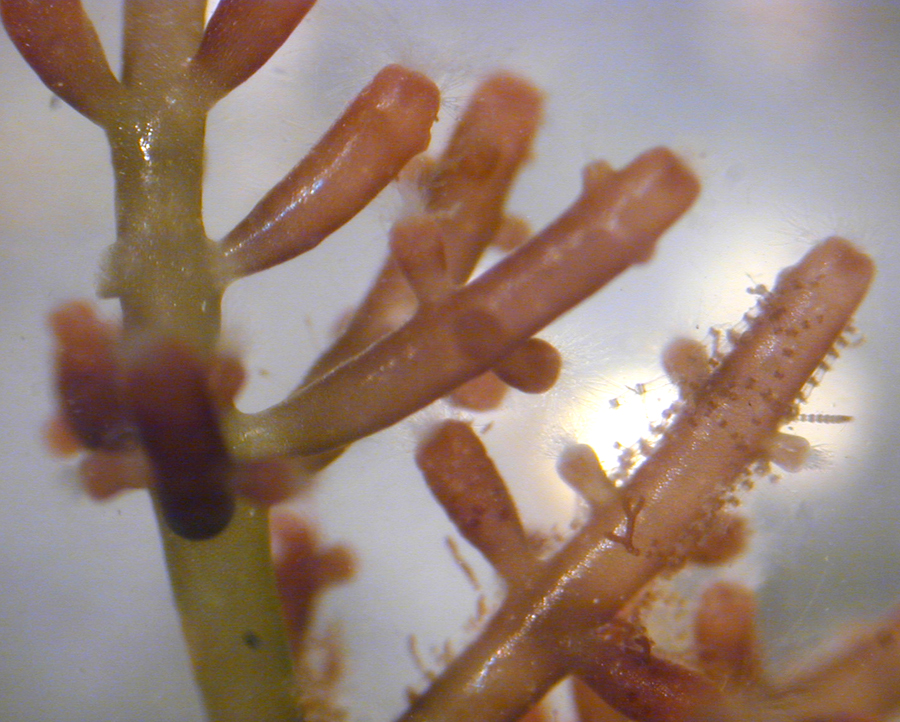
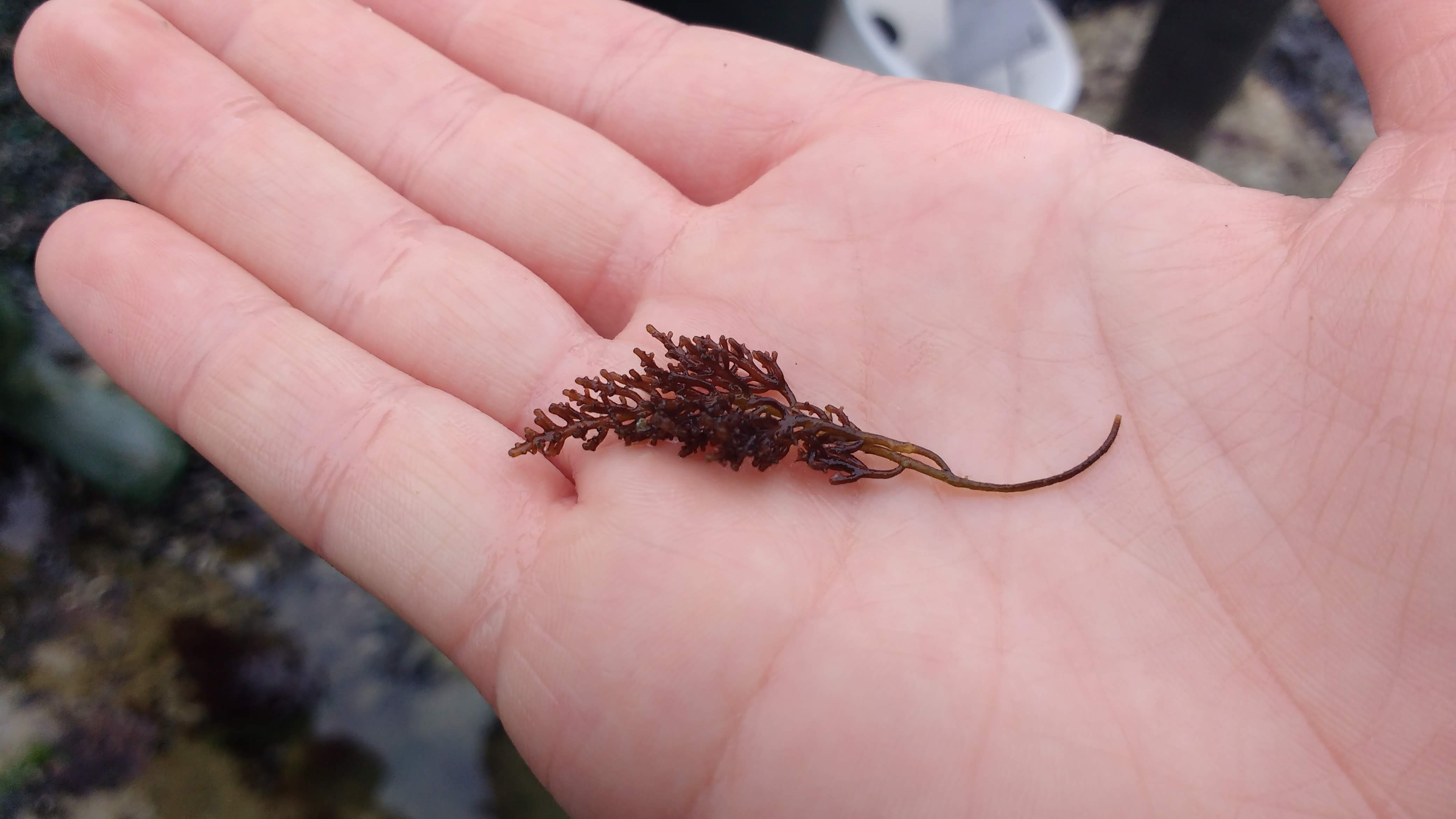
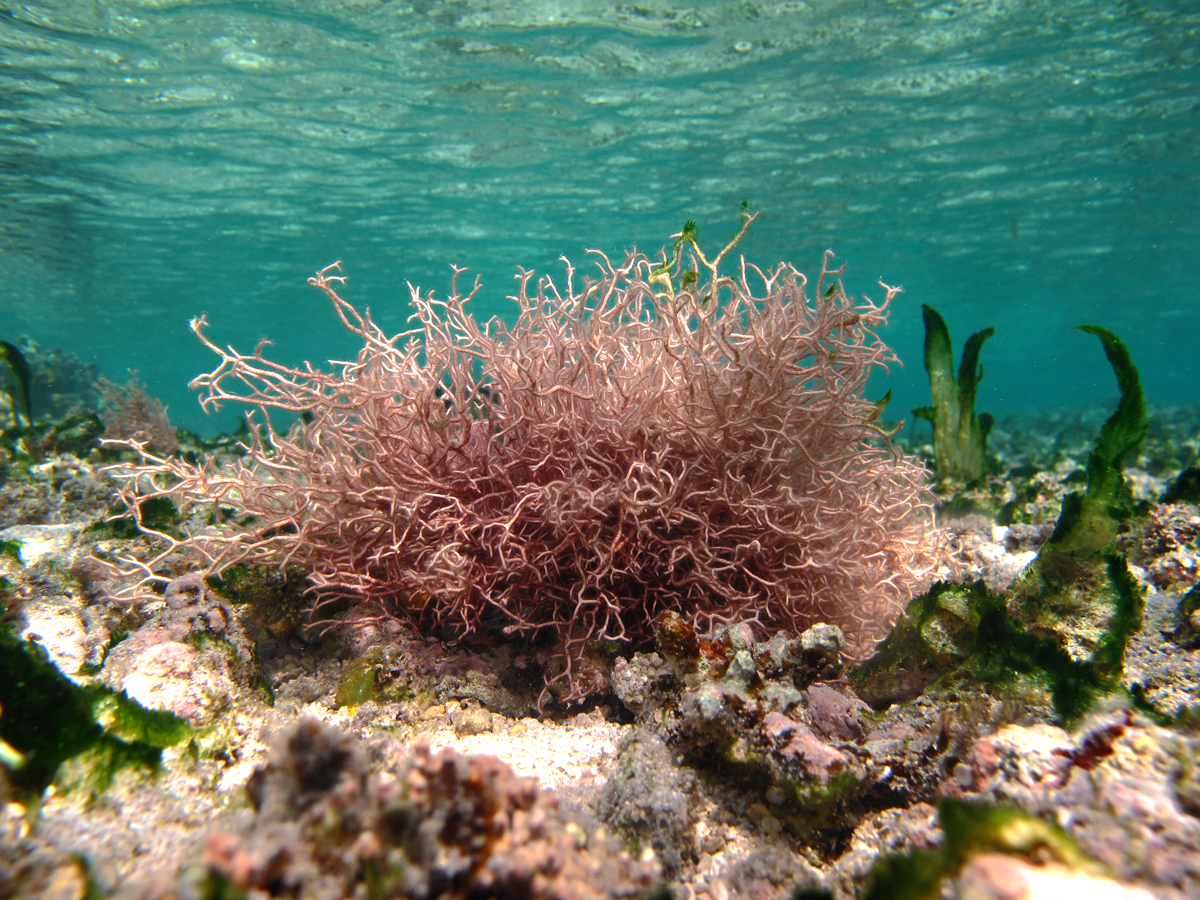
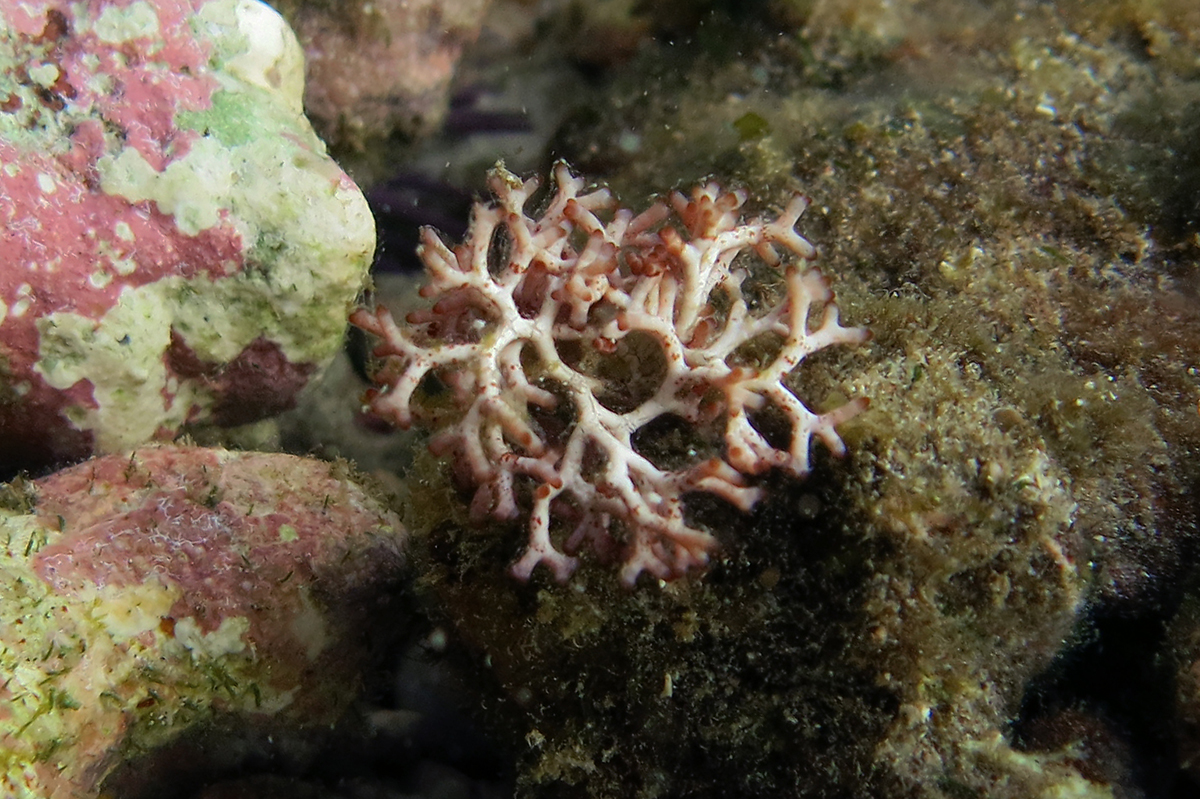
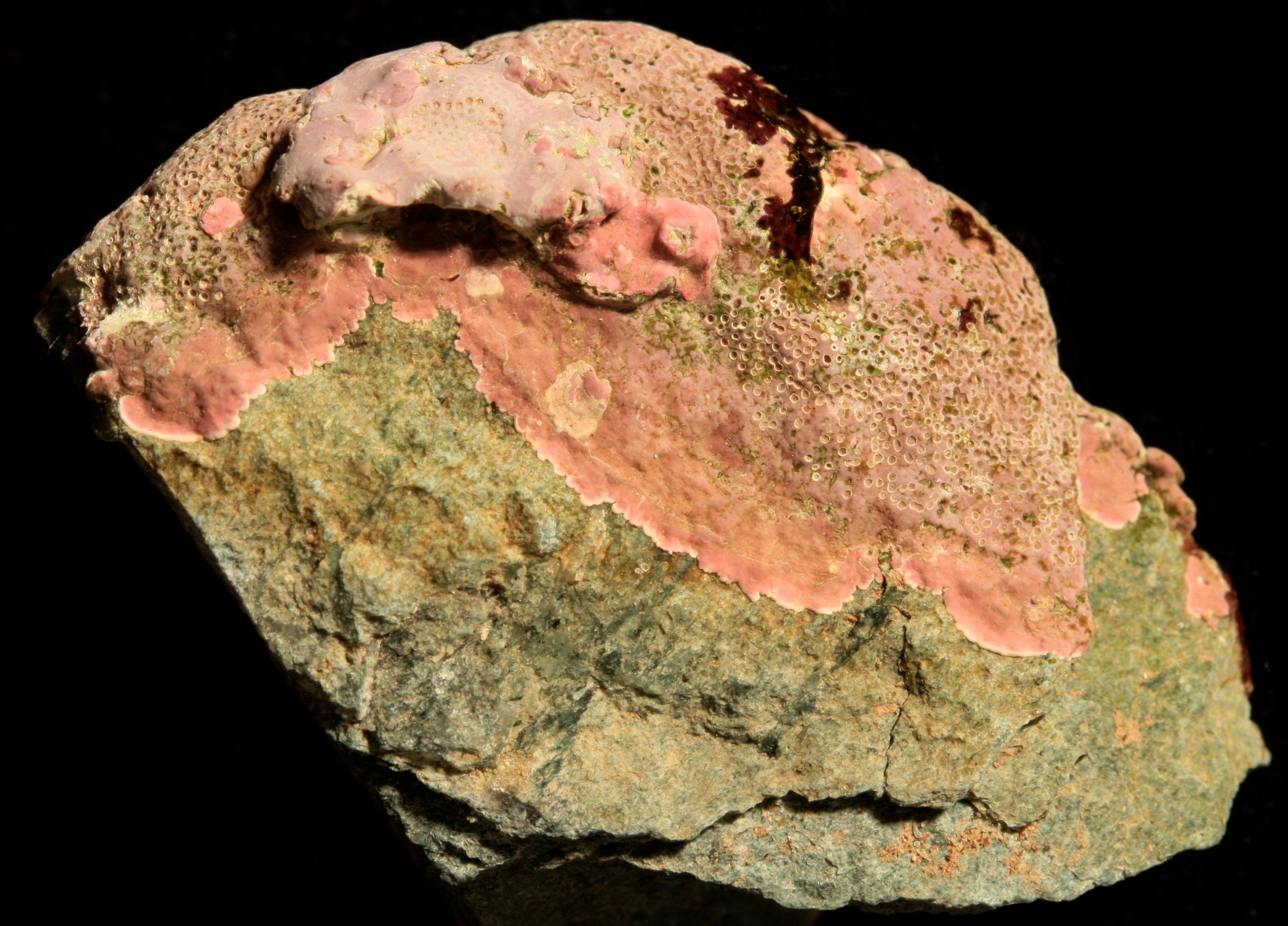
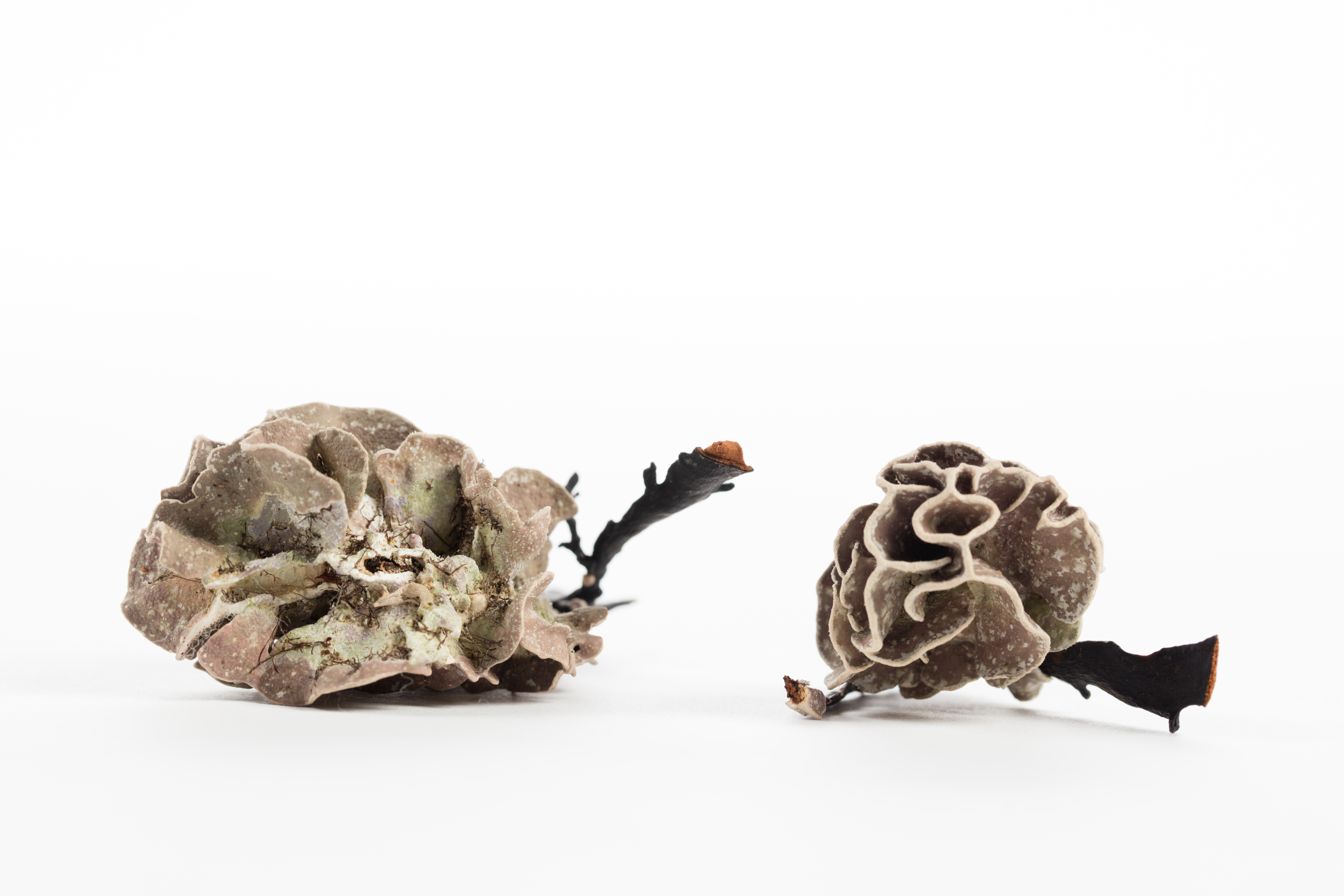
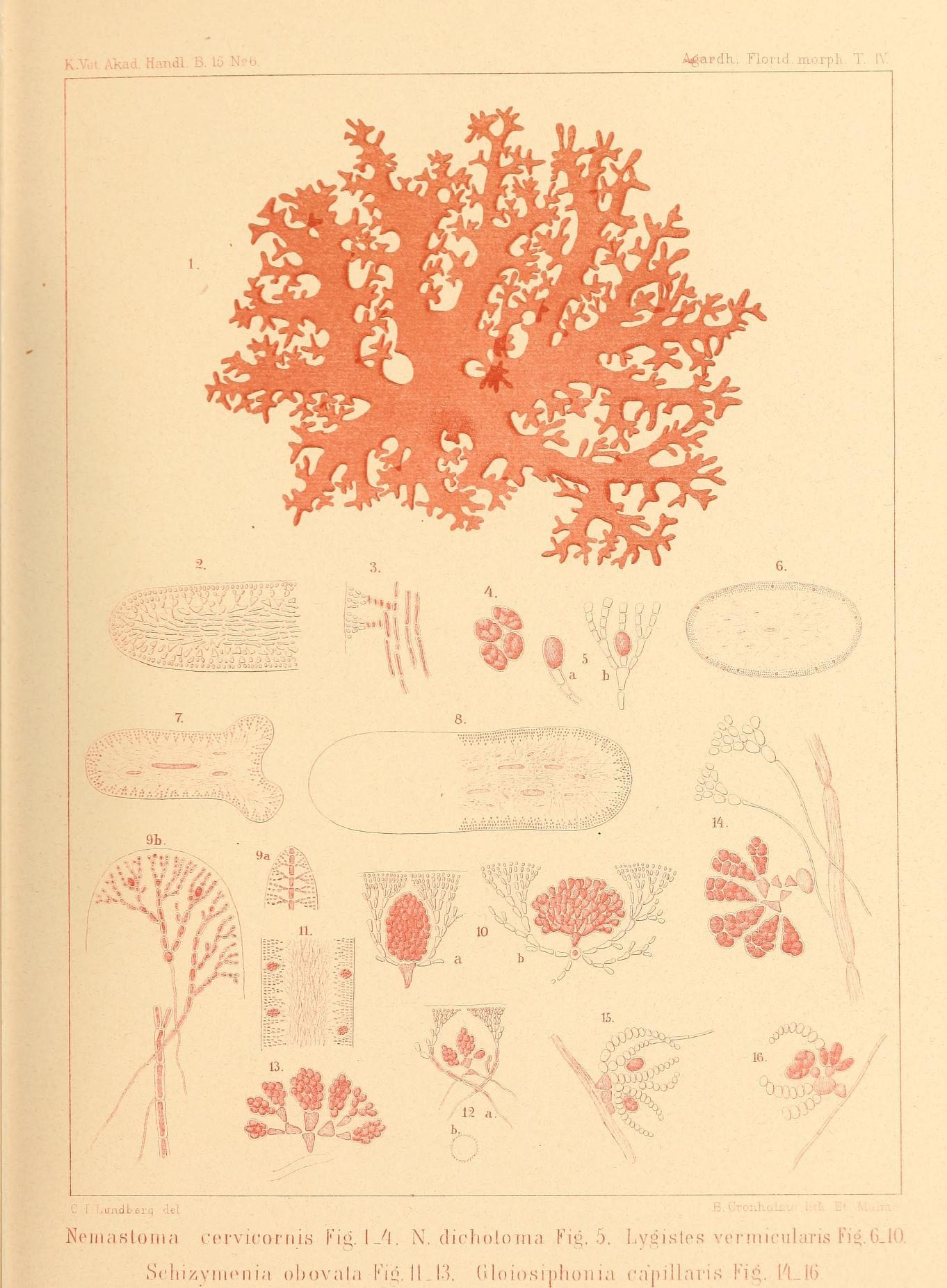
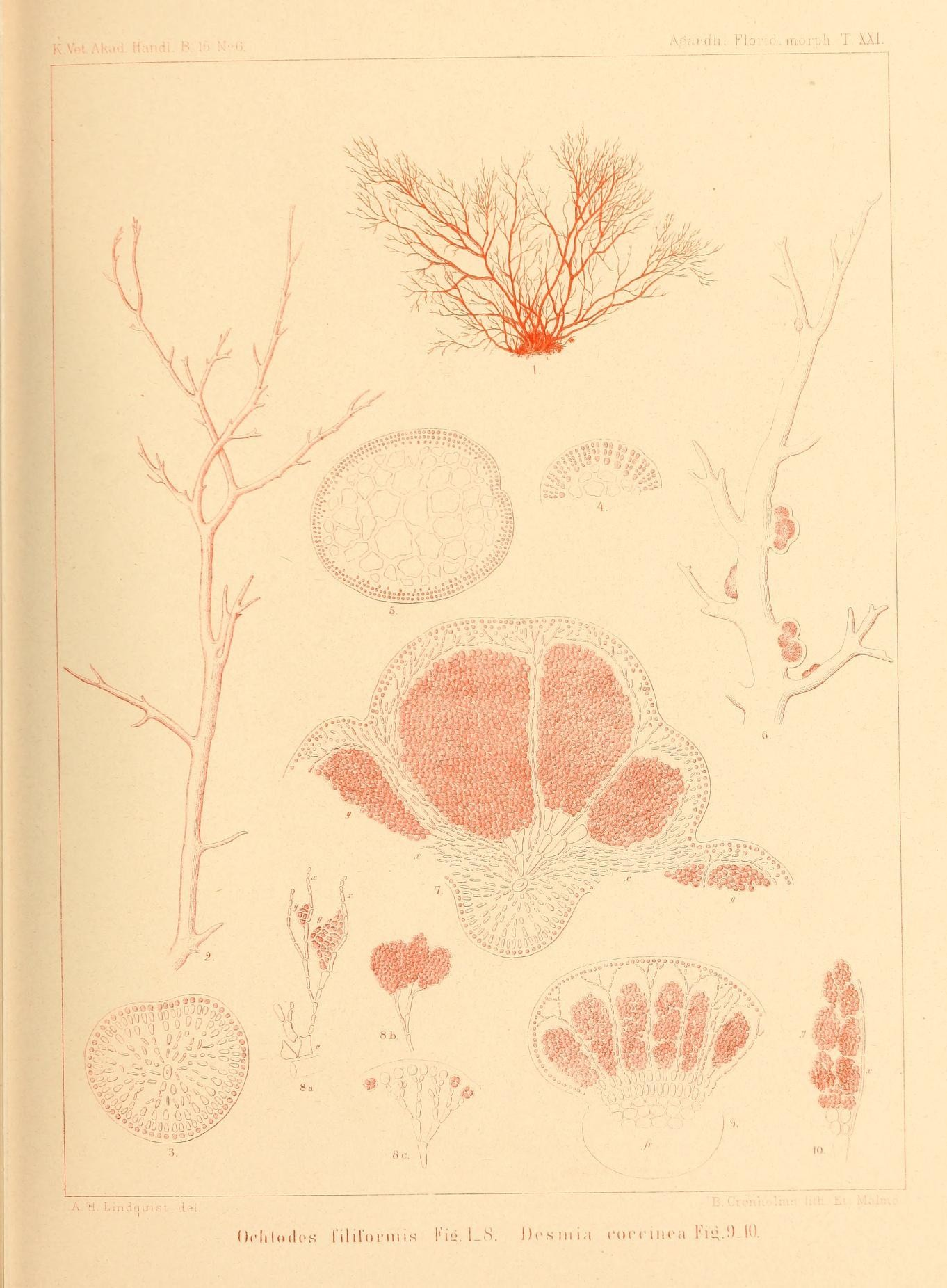
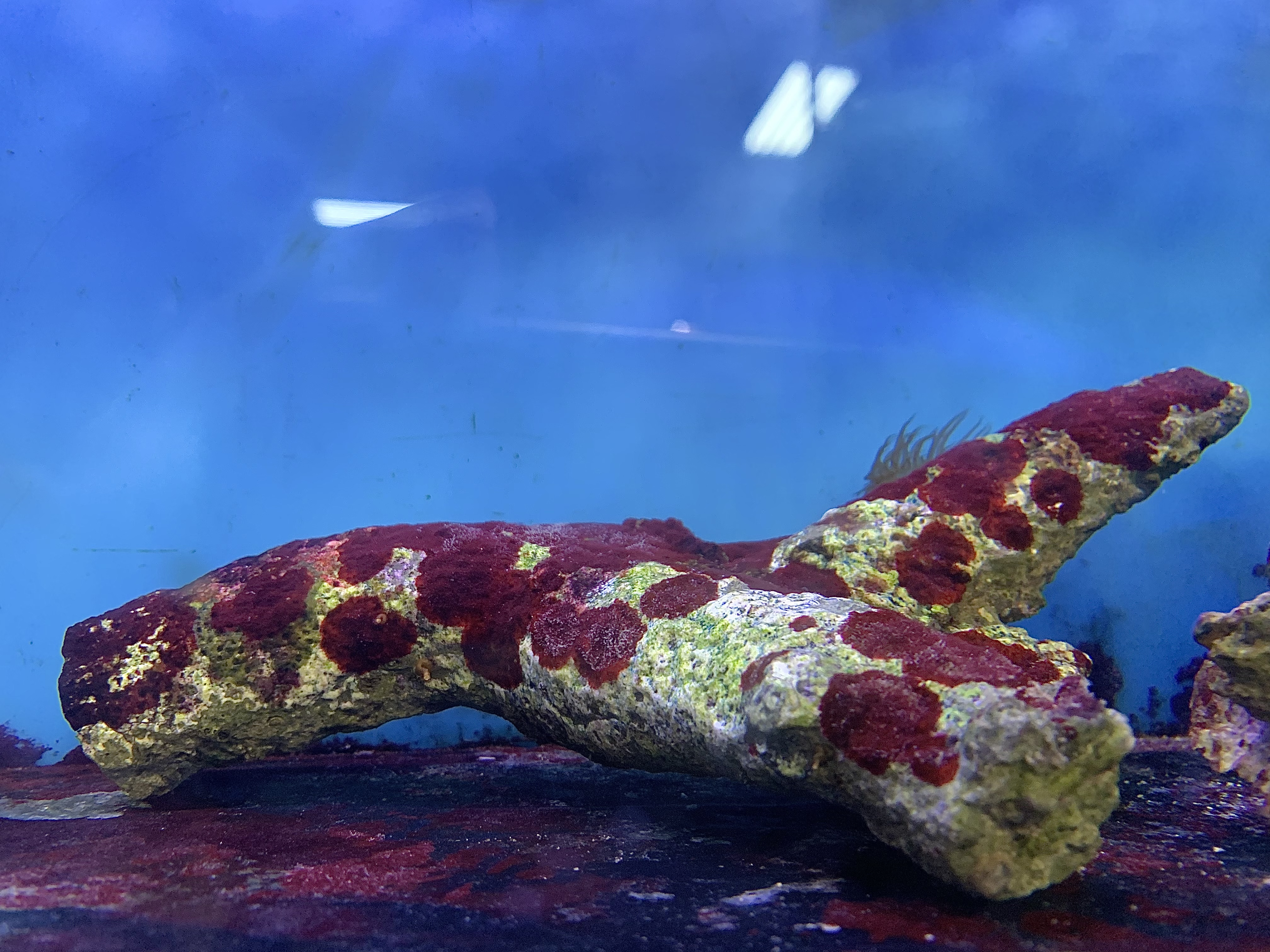
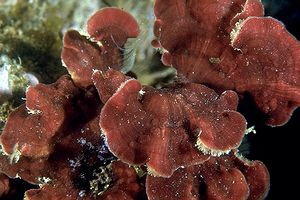
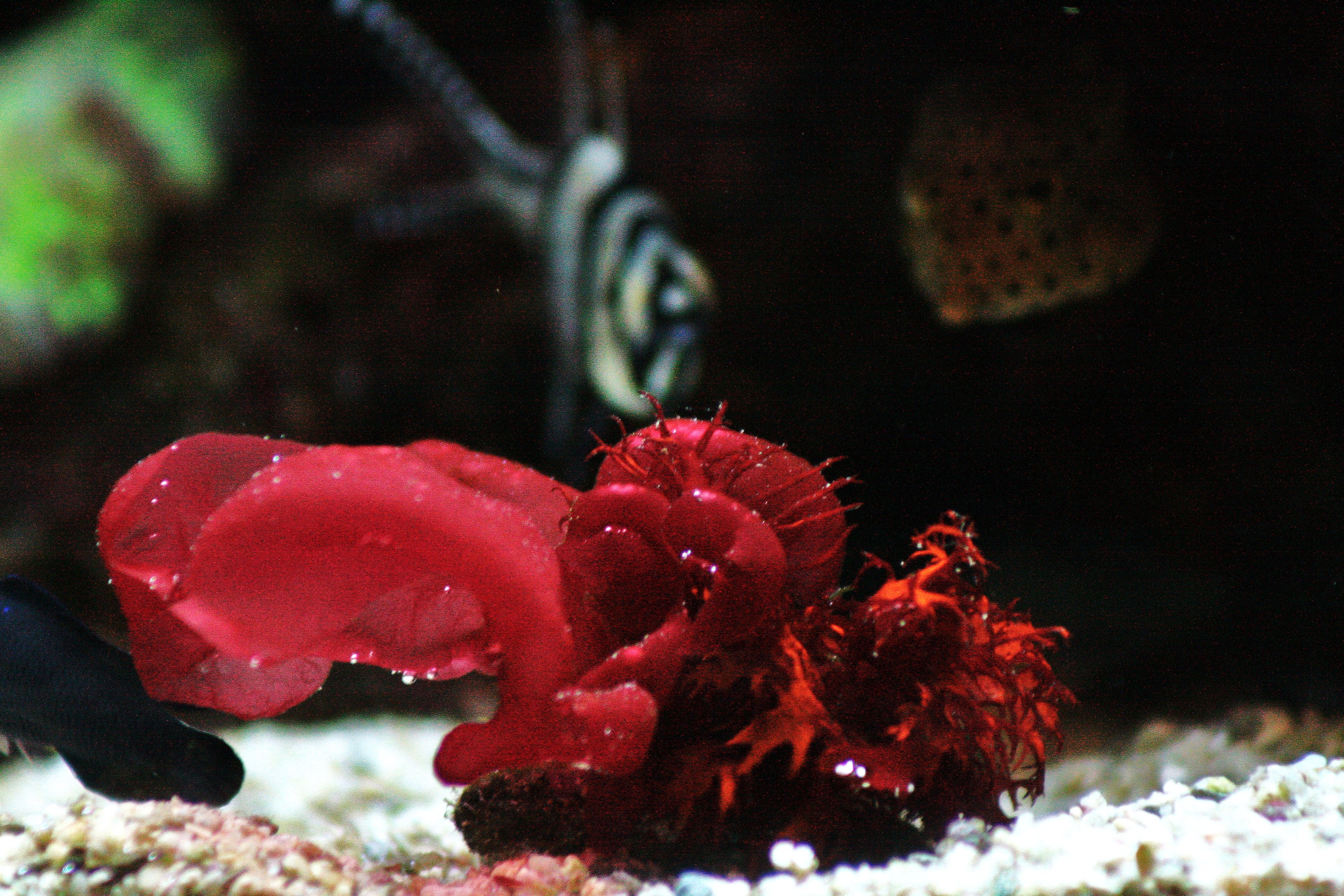
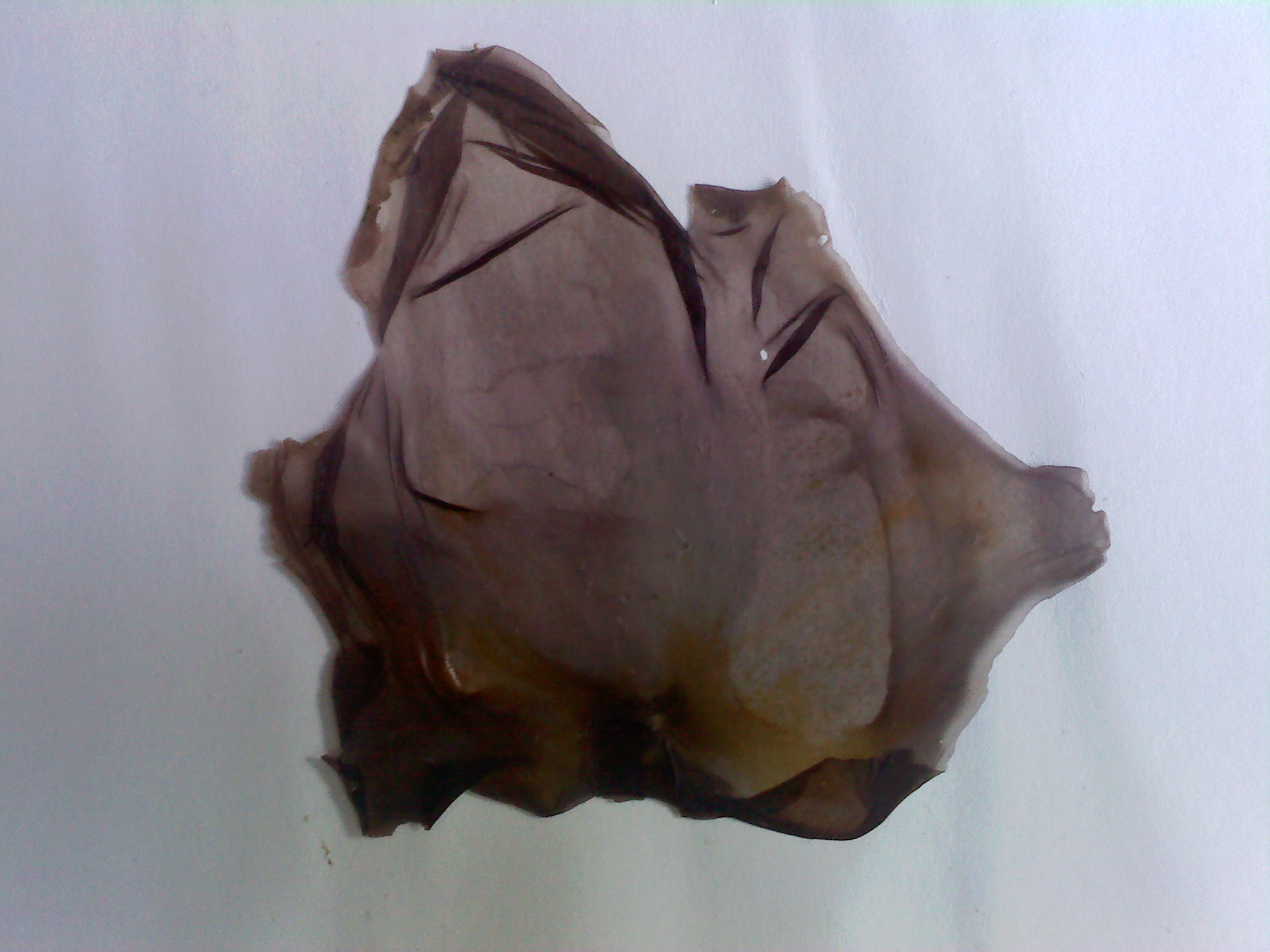
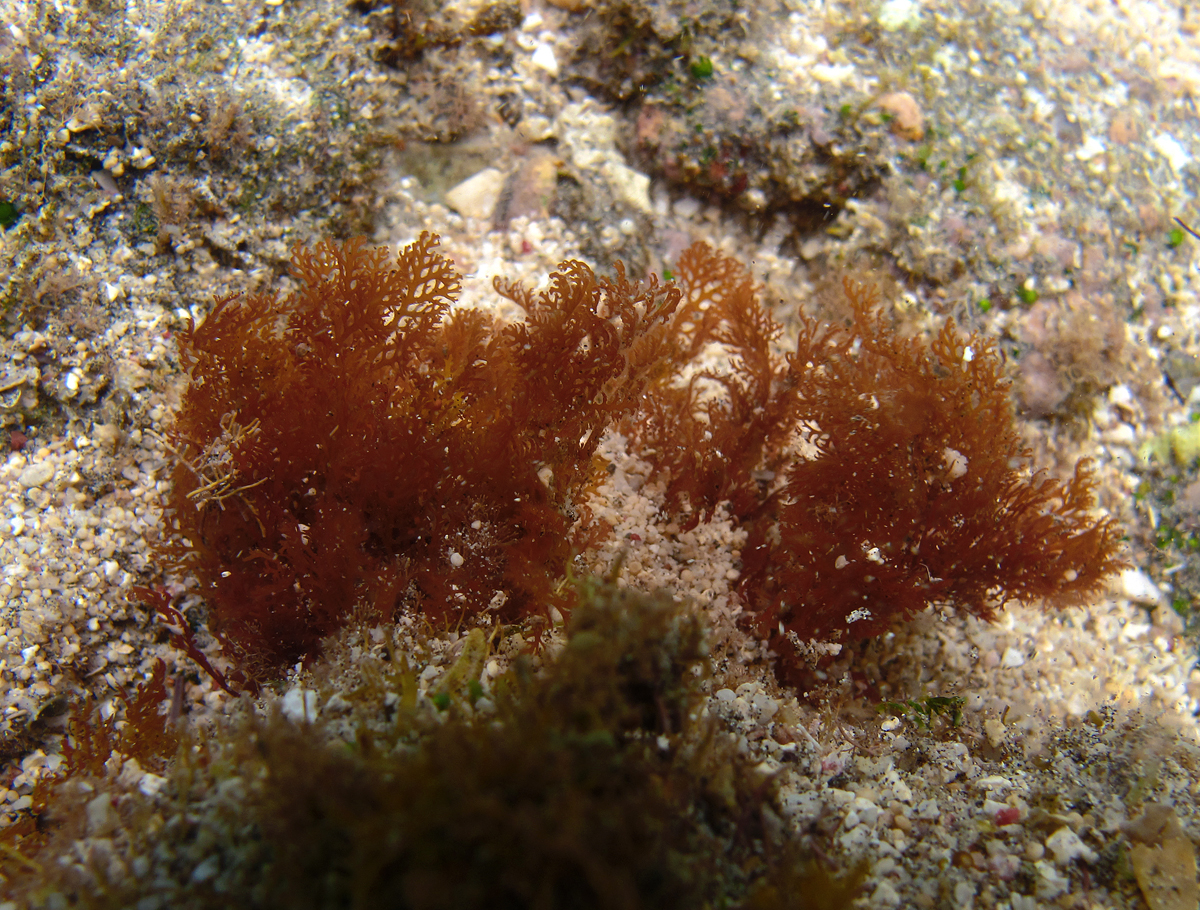
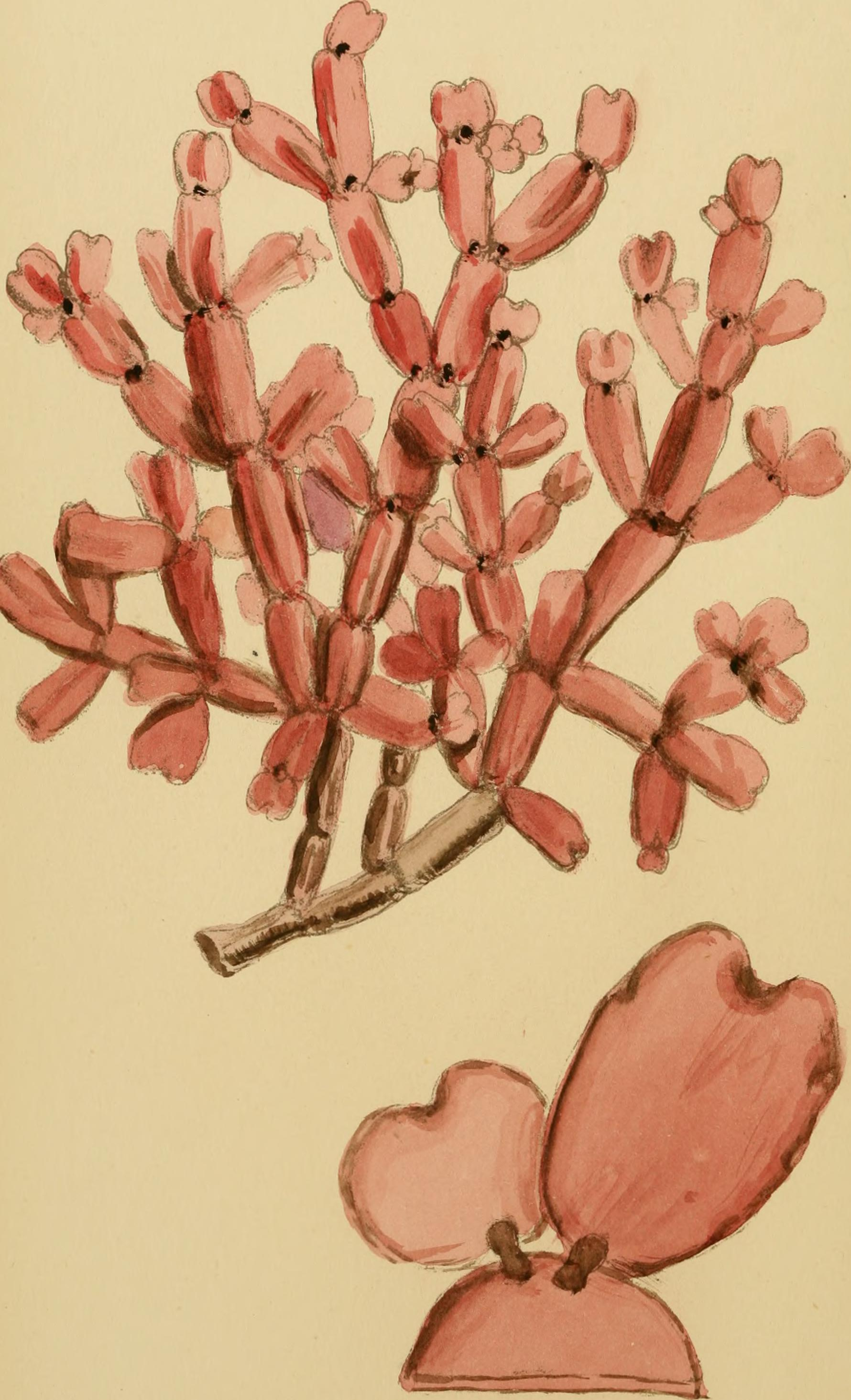
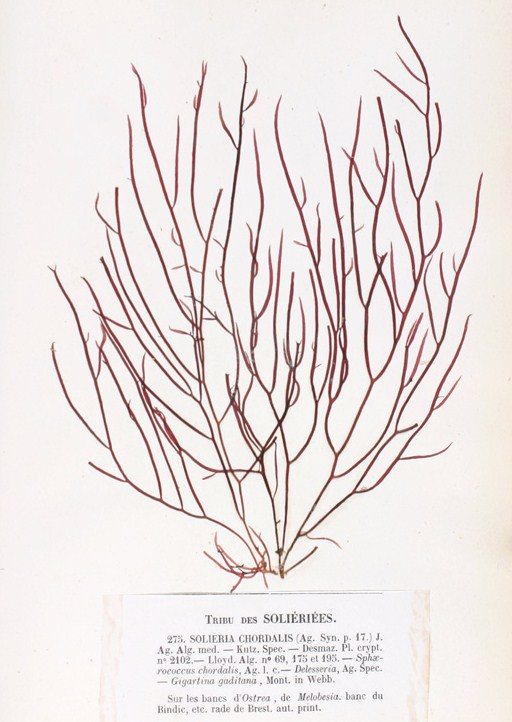
| Common name | Image | Taxonomy | Care Level | Growth rate | Nutrient uptake | Lighting | Waterflow | Palatable | Description | Max size |
|---|---|---|---|---|---|---|---|---|---|---|
| Spiny algae | | Acanthophora spicifera | Easy | Moderate | Good | Moderate-High | Moderate-High | Not really | This variable species comes in shades of red, yellow, purple, and green. Bright lighting brings out paler color while darker color is brought out by bluer lighting. Its structure consists of branches, finer and more compact than those of Laurencia. The fast growing algae must be pruned regularly. Also known as Fire fern. | 8 in (20.3 cm) |
| Agar | | Agardhiella sp. | | | | High | | Yes | The algae, Agardhiella, has similar requirements to Gracilaria and Ulva and features translucent, gelatinous fronds. In captivity, it can tolerate, but must first be slowly introduced to bright lighting and can be fed to fish. It is also a source of the substance, agar. | 12 in (30.5 cm) |
| Agardh's red weed | | Agardhiella subulata | | | | | | | This reddish purple, gelatinous algae is characterized by its numerous branchlets. It is edible to humans. Once known as Agardhiella tenera. | 12 in (30.5 cm) |
| Worm wart weed | | Agarophyton vermiculophyllum | Easy | Moderate | Good | Moderate-High | Moderate-High | Somewhat | This is a hardy species suitable for marine aquaria. It develops darker coloration under lower intensity light and is best attached to rockwork with superglue. Once known as Gracilaria vermiculophylla and also commonly called black wart weed. | 12 in (30.5 cm) |
| Red sea plume | | Asparagopsis taxiformis | Moderate | Moderate | Good | Moderate-High | Moderate-High | Yes | This algae firmly attaches to hard surfaces using multiple rhizomes as it lives in turbulent environments. It grows reddish, somewhat iridescent filaments that are compacted into clusters of cone shaped branches. It occasionally enters the aquarium trade on Pacific live rock and is also called Limu. Its sporophyte stage may be a type of Cotton candy algae, which is a fast-growing pest. | 6 in (15.2 cm) |
| Red grape | | Botryocladia sp. | Easy | Slow | Good | Moderate | Moderate | Yes | This is a beautiful, hardy, highly palatable genus of macroalgae with several species available in the aquarium trade. It bears a resemblance to a cluster of grapes, possessing stiff, lightly calcified branches covered in bright red pneumatocysts. Excessively high light will pale these pneumatocysts. Also known as Red berries as well as Red grape caulerpa despite not belonging in the Caulerpa genus. | 18 in (45.7 cm) |
| Red grape macroalgae | | Botryocladia botryoides | Moderate | Moderate | Moderate | Low-Moderate | | Yes | Despite its popularity, this algae is not often seen in the aquarium trade and is seasonally available. However, new individuals are easily produced by fragmenting the stipes of this algae. Additionally, especially when stressed, the algae may lose its pneumatocysts, though these are quickly regrown. In nature, it is found in shaded environments as well as the intertidal zone. | 4 in (10.2 cm) |
| Indonesian red grape | | Botryocladia leptopoda | Easy | | | Moderate | Moderate | | This popular species of algae has been available in the aquarium trade for a long time. It branches upward as it grows and forms dense fronds under high lighting. | 6 in (15.2 cm) |
| Red grape kelp | | Botryocladia occidentalis | Easy | Moderate | | Low | Low-Moderate | | Grows rather quickly for a species of red macroalgae and may attach both to sand and hard surfaces, though it is unlikely to become invasive. Since it prefers low lighting, it is not ideal for refugiums and is rarely available. It may be sold as Red grape caulerpa despite not belonging in the Caulerpa genus. It also keeps itself upright with pneumatocysts. | 5 in (12.7 cm) |
| Red Valonia | | Botryocladia skottsbergii | | Fast | | Low | | Yes | Unlike desirable species of Botryocladia, undesirable species do not feature calcified branches. The development of spots indicates the algae is ready for sexual reproduction, and it is likely that popping its bladders releases spores. Aggressive manual removal and clean up crew like Mithrax crabs and rabbitfish can be used to combat this algae. | 0.5 in (1.3 cm) |
| Red bubble algae | | Botryocladia pyriformis | | | | | | Yes | Unlike desirable species of Botryocladia, undesirable species do not feature calcified branches. Aggressive manual removal and clean up crew like Mithrax crabs and rabbitfish can be used to combat this algae. |
| Flame algae | | Bryothamnion sp. | | Moderate | Good | Low-High | | | Characterized by a striking red coloration which darkens under higher lighting. The algae features spiky, calcified branches, which extend in all directions and can easily be trimmed to create new individuals. It is best suited for display aquariums and must be attached to hard surfaces using glue or rubber bands as it cannot do so on its own. | 12 in (30.5 cm) |
| Red razor | | Bryothamnion triquetrum | Easy | Moderate | Poor | Moderate | Moderate-High | No | Depending on lighting, Red razor may sport either a bright or deep red coloration. In the wild, the stiff, serrated algae grows in shaded environments with strong current. It is a great addition to a Seahorse tank as its stipes may serve as hitching posts. However, it must be attached to hard surfaces using glue or rubber bands as it cannot do so on its own. | 8 in (20.3 cm) |
| Cotton candy algae | | Callithamnion sp. | | Fast | | | | Yes | Also known as red turf alga. Cotton candy algae ranges in shape from irregular tufts to branches and ranges in coloration from pink to red. Stiffer filaments develop under stronger current. If left unchecked, this algae can smother rockwork, equipment, and corals, and is difficult to eradicate. Manual removal, water quality improvement, and removal of detritus can be used to combat this algae. Herbivores, like rabbitfish and Mexican turbo snails and competition from other algae can also be employed against cotton candy algae. | 4 in (10.2 cm) |
| Red Chaeto | | Caulacanthus ustulatus | | | | | | | Unfortunately, this is an invasive species in the home aquarium and is unsuitable for reef systems and refugiums. Its prickly thallus is fragile and easily breaks up into fragments that can develop into new individuals once they settle. | 1 in (2.5 cm) |
| Bird-Nest | | Chondria sp. | Easy | Moderate | Good | Moderate-High | Moderate-High | Not really | Is a genus of highly variable (depending on the species), shallow-water turf algae that often enters aquariums on live rock and coral frags. Though it is attractive and typically remains small, it can quickly overgrow a system's rockwork. The algae features fine, compact fronds which are somewhat iridescent and translucent. Manual removal is fairly easy. | 12 in (30.5 cm) |
| Iridescent Cartilage Weed | | Chondria coerulescens | | | | | Moderate-High | | This algae inhabits very shallow water in areas sheltered from waves. It is rare in the aquarium trade and displays blue coloration under high lighting. Otherwise, it will appear reddish to purplish. |
| Coralline algae | | Corallinales sp. | Moderate | Slow | None | Moderate-High | Moderate-High | No | This order of red, calcified macroalgae is highly variable, taking on both geniculate (branching) and nongeniculate (encrusting and plating) forms as well as a variety of colors, generally ranging from purple to pink. It often makes its way into aquariums through the introduction of live rock or wild caught snails and hermit crabs where they are highly desirable as a result of their attractive appearance and ability to outcompete nuisance algae for space. However, since Coralline algae readily attaches itself to hard surfaces, it can become problematic when it grows on glass and aquarium equipment as it is hard to remove due to its carbonate skeleton. | 10 in (25.4 cm) |
| Red ribbon | | Cryptonemia crenulata | Easy | Slow | Poor | Low-Moderate | Moderate | No | This large, hardy macroalgae is incredibly rare in the aquarium hobby, though it is highly sought after. It features long, stiff, deep red blades from which new individuals and leaflets are budded. In the wild, it often attaches its holdfast to the bases of sessile invertebrates, such as gorgonians, sponges, and tunicates. | 24 in (61.0 cm) |
| Chenille algae | | Dasya sp. | Expert | Slow | Fair | Moderate-High | Moderate-High | Not really | This algae is found in both tropical and temperate waters worldwide though is most often collected from Florida and the Gulf of Mexico. It features limp, fleshy branches coated in filaments and attaches itself to hard surfaces with a single holdfast. Due it its preference for lower water temperatures, it may not be suitable for most marine planted aquariums. | 10 in (25.4 cm) |
| Red seabroom | | Digenea simplex | | | | | | | This red, mat-like algae serves as habitat for a great diversity of microinvertebrates and is coated in fuzzy filaments. | 4 in (10.2 cm) |
| Red star burst macroalgae | | Eucheuma denticulatum | Expert | Slow | | Moderate-High | Moderate | | An incredibly difficult species of macroalgae to care for as it demands very stable, lower temperature environments and struggles to survive in small aquarium systems. It has a rubbery composition; comes in yellow, orange, and red colorations; and is made up of spiny branches and branchlets. Once known as Eucheuma spinosum. | 12 in (30.5 cm) |
| Tubular thicket | | Galaxaura sp. | Expert | Slow | Fair | High | Moderate-High | No | This algae is heavily calcified and attaches itself to hard surfaces. It grows branches with flattened ends and is reddish to purplish in coloration depending on the species. Most enter aquariums on live rock and require calcium supplementation in addition to intense lighting as they originate from shallow water. Also known as Pom pom algae. | 8 in (20.3 cm) |
| Pink galaxy | | Galaxaura rugosa | Easy | Moderate | | Low-High | Low-High | Yes | Under low light or shade, this algae will appear pinkish. Brighter lighting will make it take on a reddish coloration. The algae has no waterflow preferences and grows in the shape of a dome (breaking its branches will distort the dome shape it grows into). | Over 4 in (10.2 cm) |
| Indonesian red feather | | Gelidiaceae sp. | Easy | Slow | | Moderate | Moderate | Somewhat | This algae, also known as Red grass plant, has been available in the aquarium trade for a long time. Since it originates from deep water, it remains easy to care for, even without strong lighting. The algae radiates outward as it grows and will form dense fronds under good water quality and moderate lighting. | 5 in (12.7 cm) |
| Red wiry turf algae | | Gelidium sp. | Easy | Slow | Good | Moderate-High | Moderate-High | Not really | This fan-shaped algae ranges from yellow to red in coloration. It attaches itself to hard surfaces with a single holdfast or may drift, tangled with other species. The algae is rarely available, often being sold as Gracilaria and is difficult to remove from rockwork. Also known as Red turf algae, Red wiry algae, Fern algae, and Brush algae. | 10 in (25.4 cm) |
| Purple Fauchea | | Gloiocladia sp. | Easy | Slow | Poor | Moderate-High | Moderate-High | Somewhat | A rare algae that occurs naturally as solitary individuals in depths upwards of 20 ft. It features serrated or rounded fronds with a metallic iridescence on its dorsal side and a reddish coloration on its ventral side; higher intensity lighting will make the algae more violet. It is best attached to rockwork with superglue. Smaller herbivores have difficulty consuming its thick thallus. | 4 in (10.2 cm) |
| Arcuate ogo | | Gracilaria arcuata | Easy | Slow | | Moderate | Moderate | Somewhat to some fish | This algae grows on shallow reefs and, depending on the environment, displays different colors (blackish with strong lighting, bright red with soft lighting). Due to its durability and slow growth rate, it is suitable for many different varieties of marine aquariums. | 4 in (10.2 cm) |
| Red ogo | | Gracilaria cervicornis | | | | | | Yes | This species of red macroalgae can be found in a wide array of different colors and is a preferred food of tangs and angelfish. |
| Red bush ogo | | Gracilaria curtissiae | Easy | Slow | Fair | Moderate-High | Moderate-High | Yes | Being a slow grower, Red bush ogo may take several weeks to develop a holdfast and is best attached to rockwork with superglue or by tucking it into a crevice. Individuals grow to form symmetrical bushes and develop darker coloration under lower intensity light. The algae is naturally found the intertidal zone. Also known as Red macroalgae and Ruby red algae. | 18 in (45.7 cm) |
| Pom pom | | Gracilaria hayi | Easy | Slow | Fair | Moderate | Moderate-High | Not really | This flame-like algae grows in the shape of a symmetrical, dense bush and may either attach to rocks with a holdfast or float freely. It is quite undemanding, tolerating a variety of conditions, though it is slightly calcified and may require calcium supplementation. Lower light levels will bring out the algae's most desirable, deep crimson red coloration (more light will result in duller coloration). | 24 in (61.0 cm) |
| Red mat algae | | Gracilaria mammillaris | Easy | Moderate | Fair | Moderate | Moderate-High | Somewhat | This hardy algae grows reasonable quickly, rapidly attaching itself to substrate and other algae with its tendrils, and thus requires pruning. Individuals grow to form sheet-like plates that provide cover for copepods and rotifers and develop darker coloration under lower intensity light. It is also very rare in the marine aquarium trade. | 6 in (15.2 cm) |
| Long ogo | | Gracilaria parvispora | Easy | Moderate | Good | Moderate-High | Moderate-High | Not really | This algae is characterized by long, cylindrical fronds and a single holdfast. The coloration of an individual depends on the depth it was collected from (ranging from bright red to yellow or green). It is the most popular and one of the fastest growing of the red Gracilaria species in the aquarium trade and is hardy under a variety of conditions. It is also widely used in refugiums and can be harvested as an excellent food source for a variety of herbivorous organisms. Seahorses will readily use its thallus as a hitching post. Also known as Birds nest and Red ogo. | 10 in (25.4 cm) |
| Graceful redweed | | Gracilaria tikvahiae | Easy | Moderate | Good | Moderate-High | Moderate | Yes | This algae is highly variable depending on the environment. Under higher waterflow, it grows compact flattened blades as opposed to long cylindrical blades and may also take on red, brown, and green colorations. Individual Graceful redweed can be found attached to hard surfaces or free floating and may be tumbled in refugiums. It is also an excellent food source for many herbivores. | 16 in (40.6 cm) |
| Dragon's tongue | | Halymenia dilatata | Easy | Slow-Fast | Good | Low-Moderate | Moderate-High | Yes | A stunning, easily recognizable species, characterized by fiery, serrated fronds. Depending on its environment, it will either grow in a compact form or extend and become flowy in nature. In the wild, it is found in subtidal, reef-associated regions of the Western Atlantic Ocean. It is also relished by large herbivores and can be kept in a refugium. | Over 18 in (45.7 cm) |
| Dragons breath | | Halymenia duchassaingii | Expert | | | | | | Shares its common name with Halymenia durvillei. It is an attractive algae species, naturally found in reef-associated areas on hard surfaces. In the captivity, its delicate nature makes it difficult to care for, and it is rarely seen in the aquarium trade. | 3 in (7.6 cm) |
| Dragon's breath | | Halymenia durvillei | Easy | Moderate | Good | Moderate-High | Moderate-High | Yes | This reddish algae has a soft composition (though more rigid and thicker than those of other members of its genus) with tips that will fluoresce a vibrant orange to yellow under moderately strong actinic lighting. It is highly popular, though it is often confused with other species, such as Halymenia dilatata and Gracilaria hayi. The algae grows in cycles and must be regularly split to be preserved. | 14 in (35.6 cm) |
| Red finger | | Halymenia elongata | Moderate | Moderate | Good | Moderate-High | Moderate-High | Yes | This algae possesses a gelatinous composition and a yellow to pink coloration. It forms tube-like blades anchored by a single holdfast. Though it is rarely sold in the hobby, it often enters aquariums on live rock from the Gulf of Mexico and through spores. | 12 in (30.5 cm) |
| Flagweed | | Halymenia floresii | Moderate | Slow | Good | Low-Moderate | Moderate-High | Yes | This sktriking, popular, highly palatable, and easily obtained species of Halymenia, like others belonging in its genus, is very delicate and possesses a smooth, gelatinous texture. It should be manually anchored or allowed to float freely as it rarely forms a holdfast. Other names for this algae include Red sea lettuce and Dragon's tongue. | 20 in (50.8 cm) |
| Red sea lettuce | | Halymenia floridana | Easy | Moderate | Good | Low-Moderate | Moderate-High | Yes | Depending on depth, this algae may take on a red to yellow coloration. Like others of its genus, it is very delicate and possesses a smooth, gelatinous texture. It is also compact and features rounded and irregular blades like Sea lettuce. It should be manually anchored or allowed to float freely as it rarely forms a holdfast. | 18 in (45.7 cm) |
| Leafy sphere ogo | | Halymenia maculata | Easy | Slow | Fair | Moderate-High | Moderate-High | Yes | This popular and vibrant species features stiff, blotchy purplish-light red to deep red blades, based on lighting conditions (however, it will turn grey under excessively high intensity light). Additionally, it is highly palatable to larger herbivorous fish and makes for a good refugium addition. In the wild, it is found in subtidal, reef-associated regions of the Indian and Western Pacific Oceans. Also known as Leafy ogo. | 7 in (17.8 cm) |
| Flamingo feather algae | | Heterosiphonia gibbesii | Difficult | | Fair | High | High | Yes | As this algae is difficult to keep alive, it should only be attempted by experienced aquarists. It possesses a delicate complex of branches which may feature red, pink, brown, or yellow coloration. It also prefers cooler water temperatures, between 72 °F (22.2 °C) and 78 °F (25.6 °C). Since it is palatable, it should be kept away from most herbivores. | 8 in (20.3 cm) |
| Rusty rock | | Hildenbrandia rubra | Easy | | | Low | | | It is a pinkish, calcareous algae that encrusts solid surfaces and has minimal requirements. Once known as Hildenbrandia prototypus. | 8 in (20.3 cm) |
| Encrusting red algae | | Hydrolithon sp. | Moderate | Slow | None | Moderate-High | Moderate-High | No | This calcified genus of Coralline algae encrusts shallow-water rocks, helping to build reefs by cementing dead coral together. It is pink-purplish in coloration and features irregular knobs. Fragments of the algae may be placed in aquariums to kickstart the growth of Coralline algae. | 10 in (25.4 cm) |
| Tattered sea moss | | Hypnea pannosa | Moderate | Moderate | | Moderate-High | Moderate | | Also known as Blue hypnea, this algae takes on red, green, and purple colorations, though blue individuals are the most highly sought after. It grows in bushy clusters, much like Ochtodes which it is sometimes confused with. Despite not being ideal for nutrient export in aquaria, it remains popular for its coloration and iridescence (which may be enhanced under blue lighting). | 8 in (20.3 cm) |
| Pink segmented algae | | Jania sp. | Easy | | | Moderate | Moderate | | This is a Coralline algae, composed of calcified, red to pink branches with white joints. It is naturally found in shady, sheltered areas. | 6 in (15.2 cm) mound |
| Red fern | | Jania sp. | Easy | Moderate | Fair | Moderate-High | Moderate | Somewhat | This popular genus of macroalgae grows calcified branches with fern shaped blades and has a red or pink coloration. It can be found growing on live rock and some species are epiphytic and grow on other algae. Most species in this genus are temperate water species yet they can tolerate warmer temperatures. Also known as Smooth kelp and was once known as Haliptilon. | 8 in (20.3 cm) |
| Slender-beaded coral weed | | Jania rubens | Easy | | | High | | Not really | In nature, this hardy species is found in shallow water, often as an epiphyte on other algae. It features lightly calcified, maroon branches which require adequate flow to be maintained. | 6 in (15.2 cm) |
| Filamentous red alga | | Kapraunia schneideri | | | | | | | This is a seasonal species and is naturally found attached to hard surfaces in winter. |
| Purple bush algae | | Laurencia sp. | Easy | Moderate | Good | Moderate | Moderate | Yes | This genus of undemanding algae is highly variable and it may be difficult to differentiate between its species. Typically, they are bright red (lower light will bring out a deeper red) with short, stiff, cylindrical branches. It is found on hard bottoms of shallow-water environments, such as reef flats and seagrass meadows, often as an epiphyte. It is also highly palatable. | 8 in (20.3 cm) |
| Spaghetti weed | | Liagora sp. | Expert | Slow | Fair | Moderate-High | Moderate-High | Not really | This compact algae has a gelatinous composition and is moderately calcified. It is rare in the hobby due to its delicate nature and little is known about its care, though spores of the algae often enter aquariums through Pacific and Indonesian live rock. The algae features a pale pink to deep purple coloration. | 10 in (25.4 cm) |
| Plate coral weed | | Lithophyllum sp. | Moderate | Slow | None | Moderate-High | Moderate-High | No | This calcified genus of Coralline algae encrusts hard surfaces, helping to build reefs by cementing dead coral together. It is pink in coloration and grows plate-like projections, often with white edges. If it has not already been introduced on live rock, fragments of the algae may be placed in an aquarium. The algae also requires calcium supplementation. | 8 in (20.3 cm) |
| Red air dancer | | Nemastoma sp. | Moderate | Moderate | Good | Moderate-High | Moderate-High | Yes | Very similar to Halymenia elongata and may also be called Red finger, though this rare algae is more compact. Its gelatinous branches are filled with fluid, helping to orient the algae upright. Often, the tips of these branches are colored orange or white. The algae most often enters aquariums on live rock and can be grown under lower light levels. | 6 in (15.2 cm) |
| Blue ball | | Ochtodes sp. | Moderate | Moderate | Good | Moderate-High | Moderate | Somewhat | This highly adaptable algae is one of only a few with purple-blue coloration in the aquarium trade and is incredible popular. Usually, it grows in spurts, alternating between overgrowing its environment and dying back within the course of several weeks. In the wild, the algae grows on hard surfaces or as an epiphyte in shallow water. | 6 in (15.2 cm) |
| Burgundy crust algae | | Peyssonnelia sp. | | | | Low | Moderate | | This algae resembles Coralline algae, with edges that resemble peeling paint. It grows by encrusting. |
| Laver | | Porphyra sp. | | | | | | | In the wild, this translucent, purplish algae can be found floating freely or attached to solid surfaces with a small, yet incredibly strong holdfast. As it resides in the intertidal zone, it is well adapted to becoming dehydrated as the tide recedes. Also known as Nori, Red nori, and Purple laver and is edible to humans. | 12 in (30.5 cm) |
| Red feather | | Portieria sp. | | | Good | | Moderate | | This lesser-known algae is quite attractive, growing flat branches covered in segmented branchlets. Depending on its environment, the algae will take on a yellow, orange, or red coloration (deep red under aquarium lighting). It is also highly variable in terms of its size and composition. | 8 in (20.3 cm) |
| Silk skin | | Pugetia japonica | | | | Moderate | Low-Moderate | Yes | Silk skin grows in deeper regions of the intertidal zone and is best viewed under lighting with red and blue wavelength lamps. The algae grows as a single cloth-like frond which does not branch finely and should be handled with care due to its delicate nature. Once known as Callophyllis okamurae. | 12 in (30.5 cm) |
| Red bone grass | | Rhodopeltis sp. | Easy | Slow | Poor | Moderate-High | Moderate-High | Somewhat | A stiff algae that provides good cover for smaller animals and is ideally attached to rockwork with superglue. Seahorses will readily use its thallus as a hitching post. It is difficult for small herbivorous fish to consume, though it may be fall prey to tangs. New growth is white in coloration. | 5 in (12.7 cm) |
| Red finger algae | | Scinaia complanata | Moderate-Expert | Moderate | | Moderate-High | Low-Moderate | Yes | This challenging species demands stable water parameters and should not be excessively handled due to its fragility. It grows in red to pink, gelatinous clumps. If the algae is in poor health, this may indicate that it requires iodine supplementation. Crabs and tangs readily consume this algae. Also known as red leaf macro algae. | 5 in (12.7 cm) |
| Moniliform sea moss | | Scinaia hormoides | | | | | | Yes | This species grows in clumps and is favored by tangs. | 3 in (7.6 cm) |
| Red bamboo algae | | Solieria sp. | Easy | Moderate | Fair | Moderate-High | Moderate | Somewhat | This is a unique, uncommon algae with fleshy, cane-like fronds that split into new fronds at their ends. It is difficult for small herbivorous fish to consume, though it may be fall prey to tangs. While it can secure itself to rocks and coarse substrates with its holdfasts, it is ideally attached to rockwork with superglue. | 12 in (30.5 cm) |
| Ribbon algae | | Tricholgloea sp. | Expert | Slow | Fair | Moderate-High | Moderate | No | This algae possesses a gelatinous composition and flat branches with white ribs. Some species are mildly calcified and they range from red to purple in coloration. It is naturally solitary, being found on hard bottoms in pristine environments. It is also incredibly rare in the aquarium hobby and is difficult to care for. | 10 in (25.4 cm) |

== Mangroves ==
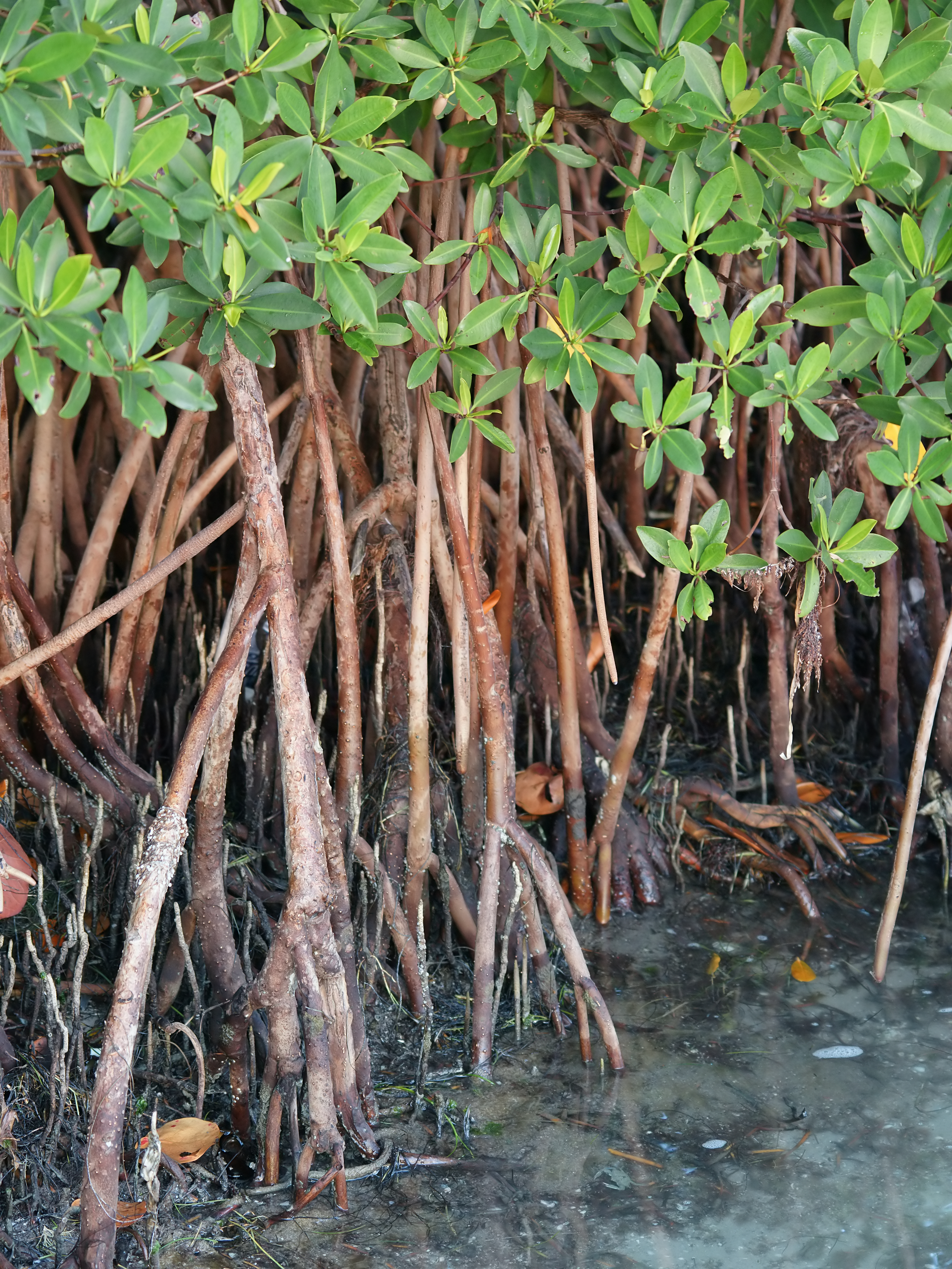
Red mangrove

Most mangroves that end up in the aquarium trade are either collected as seeds or grown on land. Their leaves should be exposed to the air, well beyond the surface of the water, and be sprayed with freshwater regularly to prevent salt buildup. They also require intense lighting and a layer of substrate, not too shallow as to let the tree topple over and not too fine which would make parts of the sandbed to go anaerobic.

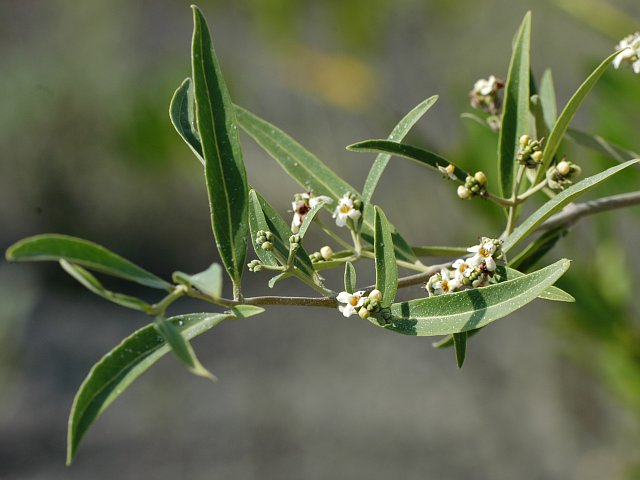
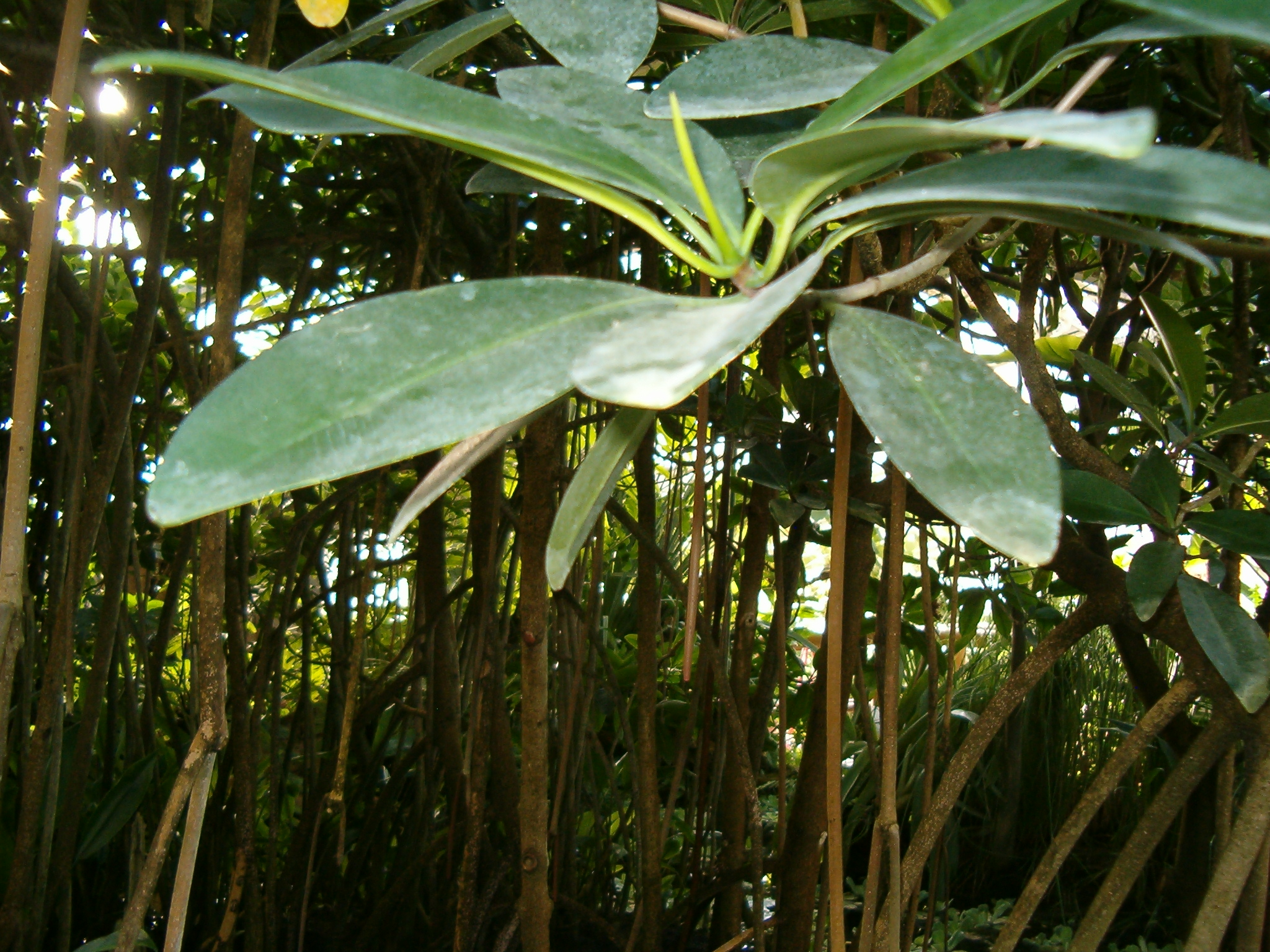
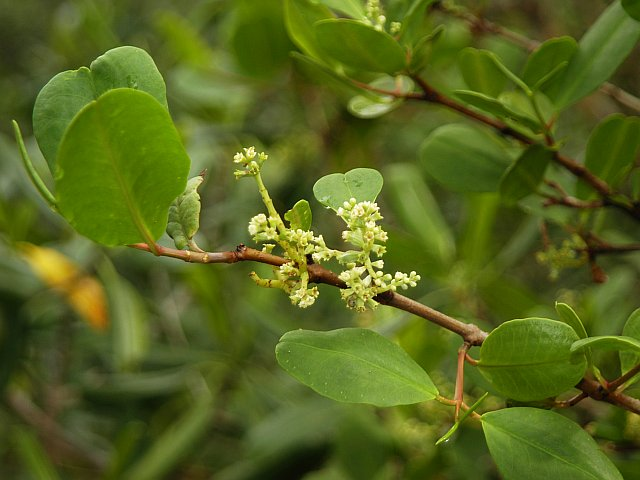
| Common name | Image | Taxonomy | Care Level | Growth rate | Description | Max size |
|---|---|---|---|---|---|---|
| Black mangrove | Cayos Mangrove02 | Avicennia germinans | Moderate | Slow | | 70' |
| Red mangrove | | Rhizophora mangle | Easy | Slow | | 80' |
| White mangrove | | Laguncularia racemosa | Expert | Slow | | 60' |

== Seagrass ==
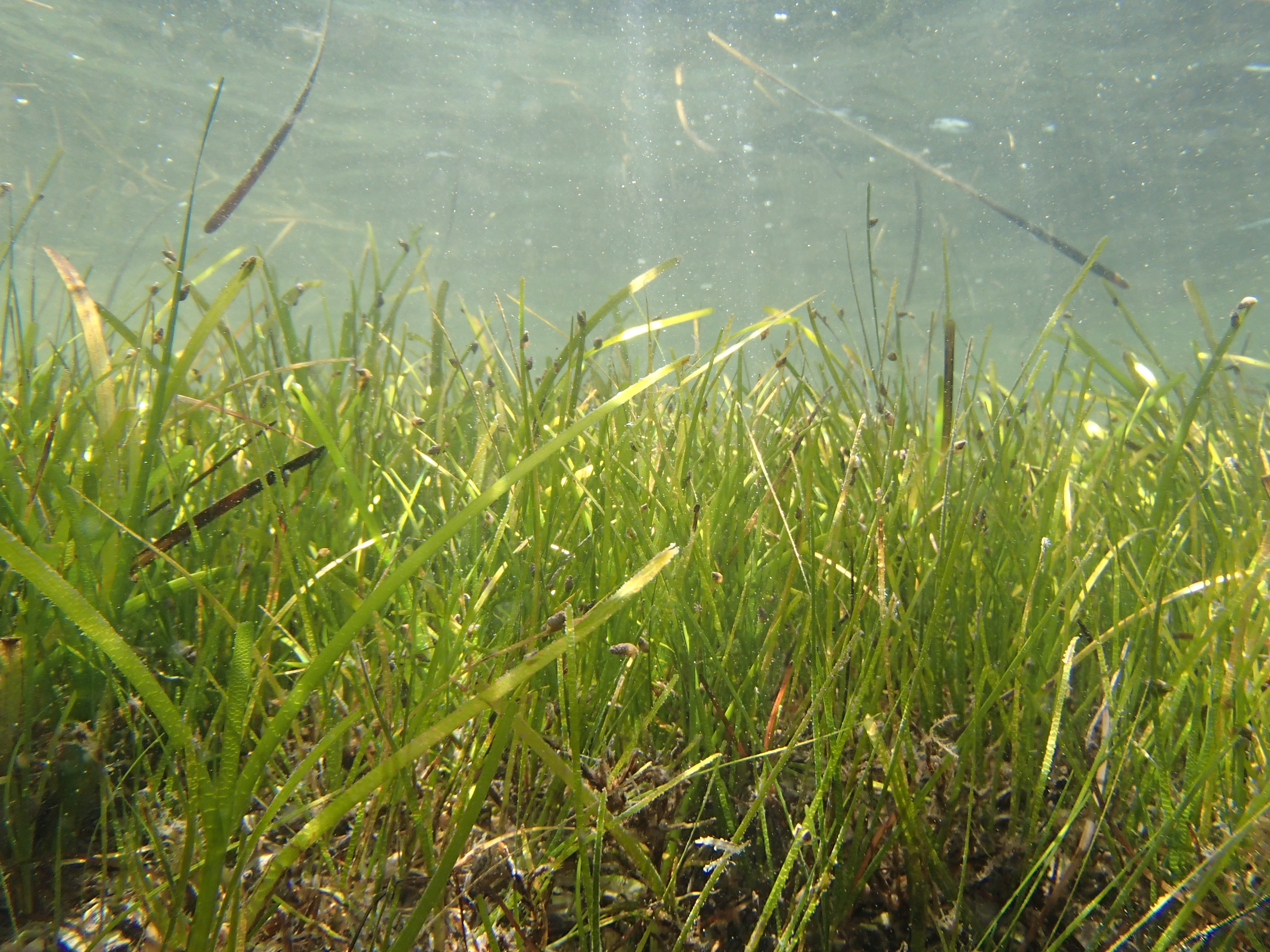
Common eelgrass

- Turtle grass, Thalassia hemprichii and Thalassia testudinum
- Manatee grass, Syringodium filiforme

== Nuisance algae ==
While algaculture is more popular in marine aquaria than in a freshwater setting, there are several species of algae that are unwanted or problematic. These species can be very difficult to remove once established. They are disseminated in the aquarium trade through improperly collected or processed material, such as live rock.

=== Hair algae ===
While there many species that may be referred to as "hair algae", species in the genera Bryopsis and Derbesia are among the most common. Bryopsis plumosa is especially troublesome. Boodlea species are occasional in marine aquaria, and may be called "crunchy hair grass". Red hair algae (Polysiphonia) may also be a nuisance.

=== Turf algae ===
"Turf algae" is a broad classifications of algae, and refers to their branched leafy or lawn-like growth habit. Green turf algae include the genera Cladophora (and potentially Cladophoropsis) and Ulva, as well as the species Chlorodesmis fastigiata.

Brown turf algae often arrive on contaminated live rock and include the genus Dictyota as well as the species Lobophora variegata and Padina australis.

Common genera of red turf algae include Galaxaura, Gelidium, and the more common species include Nitophyllum punctatum, Wrangelia argus, and Centroceras clavulatum. Although sometimes desirable, Hypnea musciformis may be considered a pest.

=== Bubble algae ===
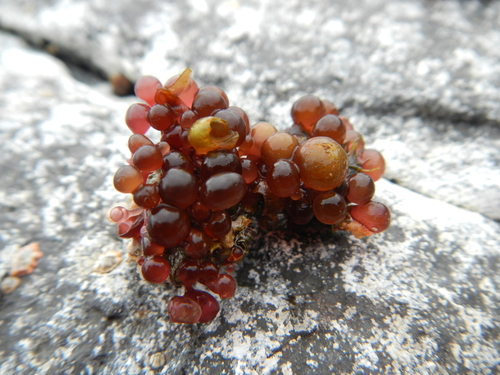
Botryocladia skottsbergii

Bubble algae can grow large and spread rapidly. The red bubble algae Botryocladia skottsbergii is especially problematic and difficult to control. Green bubble algae of the genera Valonia, Ventricaria and the species Dictyosphaeria cavernosa may become nuisances.

=== Microalgae ===
The green microalgae Ostreobium is parasitic in stony coral skeletons and compromises the structure of the animal. Brown diatom algae and dinoflagellates are also ubiquitous in marine aquaria. Blue-green algae (cyanobacteria) may also be present, with Phormidium corallyticum causing black band disease in coral.

== See also ==
- List of freshwater aquarium plant species
- List of brackish aquarium plant species
- List of marine aquarium fish species
- List of marine aquarium invertebrate species
- Marine aquarium
- Reef aquarium
